= Evelyn Waugh bibliography =

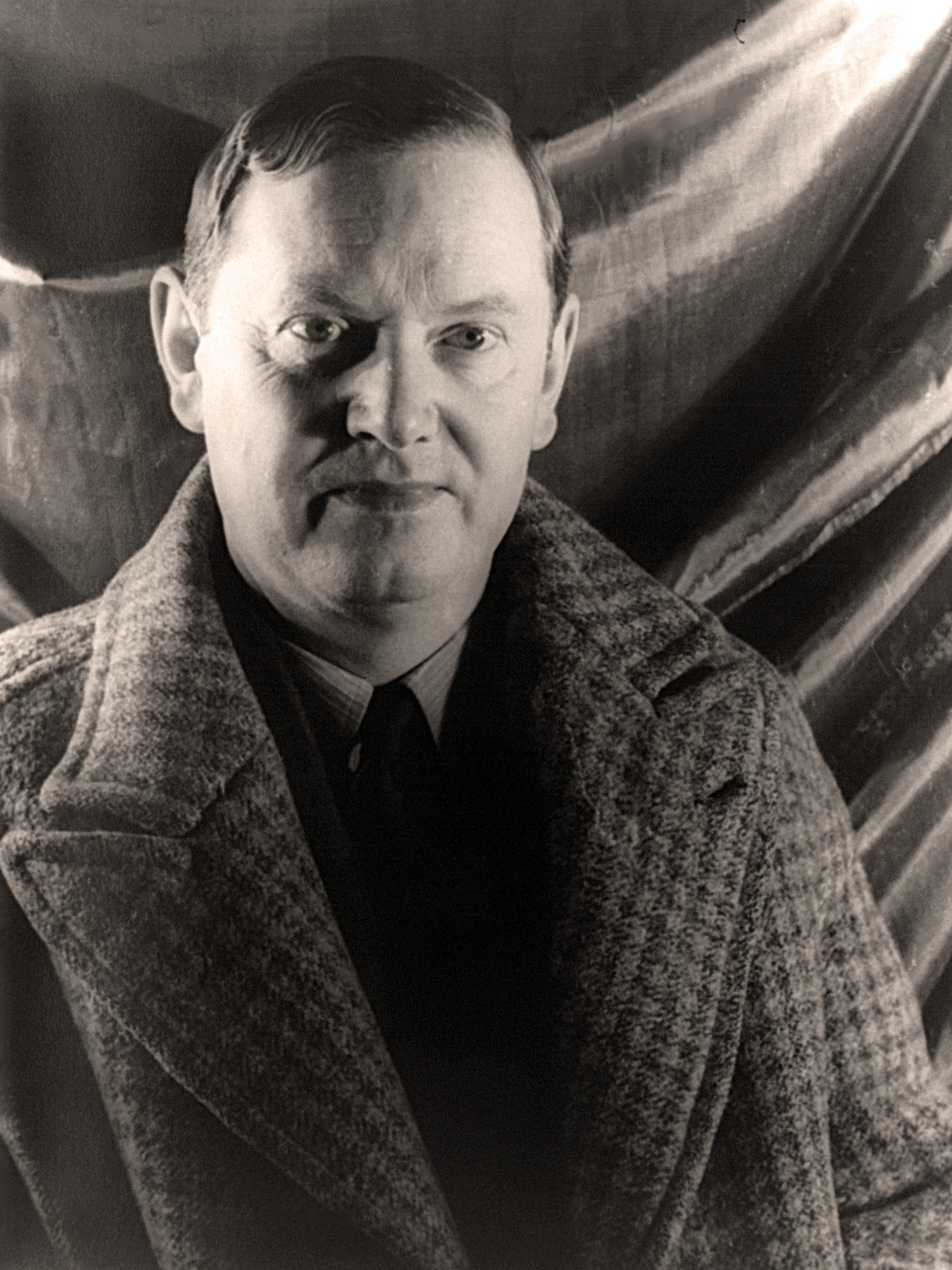
Evelyn Waugh, circa 1940

Evelyn Waugh (1903–1966) was an English writer, journalist and reviewer, generally considered one of the leading English prose writers of the 20th century. The following lists his fiction, travel and biographical works, together with selected articles and reviews.

== Juvenilia and undergraduate writing ==
Year	Title	First publication details	Notes	References
1910	"The Curse of the Horse Race"	In Little Innocents: Childhood Reminiscenses, Dame Ethel Smyth and others. Cobden-Sanderson, London 1932		
1910–14	"Fidon's Confetion"	In Evelyn Waugh, Apprentice: The Early Writings, 1910–27, R.M. Davis (ed.). Pilgrim Books, Norman, Oklahoma 1985		
1912	"Multa Pecunia"	Appeared in The Pistol Troop Magazine, 1912. Published in Evelyn Waugh: The Complete Short Stories, Ann Pasternak Slater (ed.), Everyman's Library (David Campbell Publishers Ltd), London 1998		
1916	"The World to Come: A Poem in Three Cantos"	Unpublished	Privately printed by Arthur Waugh in 1916	
1920	Untitled: "Fragment of a Novel"	In Evelyn Waugh, Apprentice: The Early Writings, 1910–27, R. M. Davis (ed.) Pilgrim Books, Norman, Oklahoma 1985		
1921	"Essay" (story fragment)	In Evelyn Waugh, Apprentice: The Early Writings, 1910–27, R. M. Davis (ed.), Pilgrim Books, Norman, Oklahoma 1985		
1921	"The House: An Anti-Climax"	In Evelyn Waugh, Apprentice: The Early Writings, 1910–27, R. M. Davis (ed.), Pilgrim Books, Norman, Oklahoma 1985		
1923	"Portrait of Young Man with Career"	The Isis, 30 May 1923		
1923	"Antony, Who Sought Things That Were Lost"	The Cherwell, 1 August 1923		
1923	"Antony, Who Sought Things That Were Lost"	The Oxford Broom, June 1923		
1923	"Edward of Unique Achievement"	The Cherwell, 1 August 1923		
1923	"They Dine With the Past" (fragments)	The Cherwell, 15 August 1923		
1923	"Conspiracy to Murder"	The Cherwell, 5 September 1923		
1923	"Unacademic Exercise: A Nature Story"	The Cherwell, 19 September 1923		
1923	"The National Game"	The Cherwell, 26 September 1923		

== Novels ==
Chapman and Hall reissued the novels in the 1960s with a uniform design, new typography and short prefaces by Waugh. Only in a couple of cases, however, were there alterations to the text.

Year	Title	First publication details	Notes	References
1924–25	The Temple at Thatch	Unpublished	Manuscript destroyed	
1928	Decline and Fall	Chapman and Hall, 1928		
1930	Vile Bodies	Chapman and Hall, 1930		
1932	Black Mischief	Chapman and Hall, 1932		
1934	A Handful of Dust	Chapman and Hall, 1934		
1938	Scoop	Chapman and Hall, 1938		
1939	Work Suspended: Two Chapters of an Unfinished Novel	Chapman and Hall, 1942 (limited edition of 500 copies)	The two chapters were "A Death" and "A Birth"; the former had previously been published as "My Father's House" (Horizon, Vol. IV, No. 23, November 1941)	
1942	Put Out More Flags	Chapman and Hall, 1942		
1945	Brideshead Revisited: The Sacred and Profane Memories of Captain Charles Ryder	Chapman and Hall, 1945	Revised edition with, according to the new preface, "many small additions and some substantial cuts": Chapman and Hall, 1960; this version immediately became standard in the UK, including for countless Penguin reissues; Waugh's American publisher, Little, Brown, continued to reprint the 1945 original until 2020, when it adopted the 1960 text for its 75th anniversary edition	
1948	The Loved One	Chapman and Hall, 1948		
1939–49	Work Suspended and Other Stories Written Before the Second World War	Chapman and Hall, 1949	Final arrangement of the Work Suspended material, this time as a sequence of short stories	
1950	Helena	Chapman and Hall, 1950		
1952	Men at Arms	Chapman and Hall, 1952	See also Sword of Honour, below	
1953	Love Among the Ruins	Chapman and Hall, 1953		
1955	Officers and Gentlemen	Chapman and Hall, 1955	See also Sword of Honour, below	
1957	The Ordeal of Gilbert Pinfold	Chapman and Hall, 1957		
1961	Unconditional Surrender	Chapman and Hall, 1961	Known as The End of the Battle in the United States; see also Sword of Honour, below	
1965	Sword of Honour trilogy	Chapman and Hall, 1965	Revised edition in one volume of Men at Arms, Officers and Gentlemen and Unconditional Surrender	

== Short fiction ==
Year	Title	First publication details	Notes	References
1925	"The Balance: A Yarn of the Good Old Days of Broad Trousers and High Necked Jumpers"	In Alec Waugh (ed.): Georgian Short Stories, Chapman and Hall, London, 1926		
1927	"A House of Gentlefolks"	In Hugh Chesterman (ed.): The New Decameron, Basil Blackwell, Oxford, 1927	Originally published as "The Tutor's Tale"	
1930	"The Manager of 'The Kremlin'"	In a series of "Real Life Stories by Famous Authors", John Bull, 15 February 1930		
1932	"Love in the Slump"	Harper's Bazaar, London, January 1932	Originally published as "The Patriotic Honeymoon"	
1932	"Too Much Tolerance"	No. 7 in a series of "The Seven Deadly Sins", John Bull, 21 May 1932		
1932	"Excursion in Reality"	Harper's Bazaar, New York, July 1932	Originally published as "An Entirely New Angle"	
1932	"Incident in Azania"	Windsor Magazine, December 1932		
1932	"Bella Fleace Gave a Party"	Harper's Bazaar, London, December 1932		
1933	"Cruise"	Harper's Bazaar, London, February 1933		
1933	"The Man Who Liked Dickens"	Hearst's International combined with Cosmopolitan, September 1933	Used as the basis for the final chapter of A Handful of Dust, 1934	
1933	"Out of Depth"	Harper's Bazaar, London, December 1933	Subtitled: "An Experiment begun in Shaftesbury Avenue and Ended in Time"	
1934	"By Special Request"	Harper's Bazaar, New York, October 1934	The final episode in A Flat in London, the serialised version of A Handful of Dust	
1934	"Period Piece"	In Mr Loveday's Little Outing and Other Sad Stories, Chapman and Hall, London, 1936		
1935	"Mr Loveday's Little Outing"	As "Mr Cruttwell's Little Outing" in Harper's Bazaar, New York, March 1935		
1936	"Winner Takes All"	Strand, March 1936		
1938	"An Englishman's Home"	Good Housekeeping, London, August 1939		
1939	"The Sympathetic Passenger"	The Daily Mail 4 May 1939	Part of the "Tight Corner" series	
1945	"Charles Ryder's Schooldays"	The Times Literary Supplement, 5 March 1982	With introduction by Michael Sissons	
1946	"Scott-King's Modern Europe"	(abridged) Cornhill, Summer 1947	Published as "A Sojourn in Neutralia" in Hearst's International combined with Cosmopolitan, November 1947	
1947	"Tactical Exercise"	Strand, March 1947	Published as "The Wish" in Good Housekeeping, New York, March 1947	
1949	"Compassion"	As "The Major Intervenes" in The Atlantic, July 1949	Expanded and republished as "Compassion" in The Month, August 1949	
1962	"Basil Seal Rides Again"	Chapman and Hall, London, 1963		

== Travel writing ==
Year	Title	First publication details	Notes	References
1930	Labels: A Mediterranean Journal	Duckworth, London, 1930	Published in US as A Bachelor Abroad, Cape, Smith, New York, 1930	
1931	Remote People	Duckworth, London 1931	Published in US as They Were Still Dancing, Farrar & Rinehart, New York, 1932	
1934	Ninety-two Days: The Account of a Tropical Journey Through British Guiana and Part of Brazil	Duckworth, London, 1934		
1936	Waugh in Abyssinia	Longmans, Green, & Co., London, 1936		
1939	Robbery Under Law	Chapman and Hall, London, 1939	Published in US as Mexico: an Object-Lesson Little, Brown, Boston, 1939	
1946	When the Going Was Good	Duckworth, London, 1946	An anthology from the 1930s books	
1952	The Holy Places	Queen Anne Press, London, 1952		
1960	A Tourist in Africa	Chapman and Hall, London, 1960		

== Biography and autobiography ==
Year	Title	First publication details	Notes	References
1928	Rossetti: His Life and Works	Duckworth, London, 1928		
1935	Edmund Campion: Jesuit and Martyr	Longmans, London, 1935		
1959	The Life of the Right Reverend Ronald Knox	Chapman and Hall, London, 1959		
1964	A Little Learning: the First Volume of an Autobiography	Chapman and Hall, London, 1964		
1919–1965	The Diaries of Evelyn Waugh	Weidenfeld & Nicolson, London, 1976		
1914–1966	The Letters of Evelyn Waugh	Weidenfeld & Nicolson, London, 1980		

== Miscellaneous works ==
Year	Title	First publication details	Notes	References
1947	Wine in Peace and War	Privately printed by Saccone & Speed Ltd, 1947		
1949	A Selection from the Occasional Sermons of The Right Reverend Monsignor Ronald Knox	The Dropmore Press, London, 1949		

== Essays, reviews and journalism ==
The Essays, Articles and Reviews of Evelyn Waugh (Ed. Donat Gallagher, Methuen, London 1983) reprints the texts of more than 200 pieces by Waugh, published in the period 1917 to 1965. More than 300 further titles are listed but not reprinted. In his Life of Evelyn Waugh, Douglas Lane Patey provides a list of the more significant pieces.

- 1917: "In Defence of Cubism" (Drama and Design, November 1917); Waugh's first published article
- 1921: "The Youngest Generation"
- 1926: "P.R.B."
- 1929: "The War and the Younger Generation" (Spectator, 13 April 1929)
- 1930: "Converted to Rome" (Daily Express, 20 October 1930)
- 1930: "Ethiopia Today: Romance and reality" (The Times, 22 December 1930)
- 1932: "Why Glorify Youth?" (Woman's Journal, March 1932)
- 1933: An Open Letter to the Cardinal Archbishop of Westminster"
- 1941: "Commando Raid on Bardia"
- 1946: "Fan Fare" (Life, 8 April 1946)
- 1946: "What to do with the Upper Classes" (Town and Country, September 1946)
- 1947: "Why Hollywood is a Term of Disparagement" (The Daily Telegraph, 30 April 1947)
- 1947: "Death in Hollywood"
- 1949: "Come Inside" (in The Road to Damascus, ed. John A. O'Brien, New York and London 1949)
- 1949: "The American Epoch in the Catholic Church" (Life [Chicago], 19 September 1949)
- 1952: "Our Guest of Dishonour" (Sunday Express 30 November 1952)
- 1953: "Mr Waugh Replies" (Spectator, 3 July 1953)
- 1955: "Awake My Soul! It is a Lord" (Spectator, 8 July 1955)
- 1957: "Anything Wrong with Priestley?" (Spectator, 13 September 1957)
- 1959: "I See Nothing but Boredom...Everywhere" (Daily Mail, 28 December 1959)
- 1961: "An Act of Homage and Reparation to P. G. Wodehouse" (Radio broadcast, BBC, 15 July 1961; Printed in Sunday Times, 16 July 1961)
- 1962: "Sloth" (Sunday Times, 7 January 1962 in The Seven Deadly Sins series)
- 1962: "Eldorado Revisited" (National Review 9 October 1962)
- 1962: "The Same Again, Please" (Spectator, 23 November 1962)

== Sources ==
- Gallagher, Donat, ed. (1983). The Essays, Articles and Reviews of Evelyn Waugh. London: Methuen. ISBN 0-413-50370-4.
- Patey, Douglas Lane (1998). The Life of Evelyn Waugh. Oxford: Blackwell. ISBN 0-631-18933-5.
- Pasternak Slater, Ann, ed. (1998). Evelyn Waugh: The Complete Short Stories. London: Everyman's. ISBN 1-85715-190-9.
- Stannard, Martin (1993). Evelyn Waugh, Volume I: The Early Years 1903–39. London: Flamingo. ISBN 0-586-08678-1.
- Stannard, Martin (1993). Evelyn Waugh, Volume II: No Abiding City 1939–1966. London: Flamingo. ISBN 0-586-08680-3.
