= Muthaiga Country Club =

Club in Nairobi, Kenya

Mūthaiga Country Club
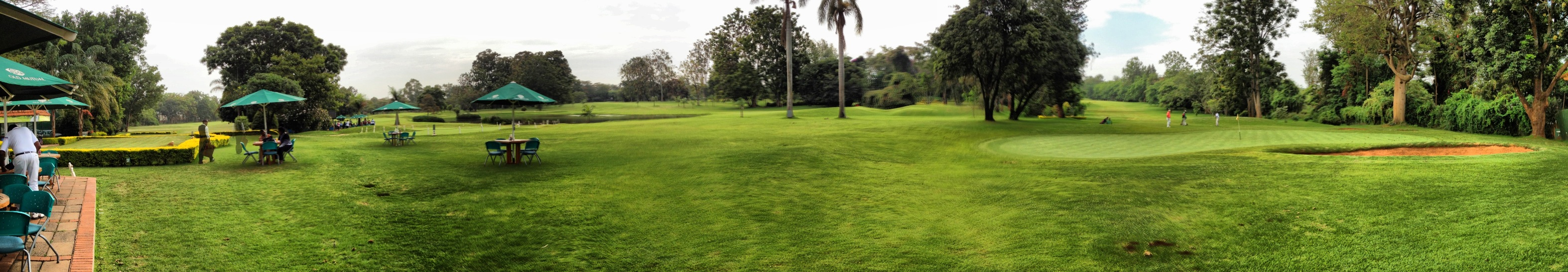
- Muthaiga Golf Club
- Interactive map of the Mūthaiga Country Club area

General information
- Type: Country club
- Location: Nairobi, Kenya
- Coordinates: 1.2591°S 36.8371°E
- Opened: 31 December 1913

Website
- Muthaiga Country Club

The Mūthaiga Country Club is a country club in Nairobi, Kenya. It is located in the suburb of Muthaiga, about 15 minutes’ drive from the city centre.

The Mūthaiga Country Club opened on New Year's Eve in 1913, and became a gathering place for the colonial British settlers in British East Africa, which became the Colony of Kenya in 1920.

== Founding history ==
One of the club's main founders was The Hon Berkeley Cole (1882–1925), an Anglo-Irish aristocrat from Ulster. Cole was a son of the 4th Earl of Enniskillen and was a brother of The Hon Lowry Cole (1881–1929). Berkeley Cole was also the brother-in-law of Hugh, Lord Delamere, effective 'founder' of the White community in Kenya.

Caroline Elkins describes the club as having had a reputation during colonial times as "the Moulin Rouge of Africa", where the elite "drank champagne and pink gin for breakfast, played cards, danced through the night, and generally woke up with someone else's spouse in the morning". According to Ulf Aschan, "The club had a rule, still in force today, that a member is entitled to damage any loose property as long as he pays double its value".

Today, the club is still frequented by the upper echelons of Kenyan society. In addition to social gatherings, the club offers accommodation. Many of its members play golf at the nearby Muthaiga Golf Club.

== In popular culture ==
Evelyn Waugh describes the Mūthaiga Country Club in his 1931 travel book Remote People (also included in the anthology When the Going Was Good). Whilst Waugh was unable to find accommodation on the premises, he discovered, upon his arrival in Nairobi, that he was already a temporary member, as he had been registered by the secretary of the club who knew about his arrival.

The Mūthaiga Country Club is described in Beryl Markham's 1942 memoir West with the Night: "'Na Kupa Hati M'zuri' (I Bring You Good Fortune) was, in my time, engraved in the stone of its great fireplace. Its broad lounge, its bar, its dining-room—none so elaborately furnished as to make a rough-handed hunter pause at its door, nor yet so dowdy as to make a diamond pendant swing ill at ease—were rooms in which the people who made the Africa I knew danced and talked and laughed, hour after hour."

The club is also mentioned in Ernest Hemingway's short story "The Short Happy Life of Francis Macomber", a story centered around big game hunting in Kenya.

The Muthaiga club is frequently referenced in the background of John LeCarre's 2001 novel The Constant Gardner as a place of gossip among the diplomatic community.

The club is featured in Lucinda Riley's 2019 novel The Sun Sister, the sixth book in the author's The Seven Sisters series.

== See also ==
- White Mischief (1987 film)
- Out of Africa (memoir, originally published in 1937)
- Out of Africa (1985 film)
- Happy Valley set
- Denys Finch Hatton
- Beryl Markham
- Bror von Blixen-Finecke
