= Mrs. Stitch =

Mrs. Algernon Stitch, more familiarly known as Julia Stitch, is a character created by Evelyn Waugh, best known for her role in the novel Scoop. The character was inspired by Waugh's friendship with the well-connected socialite, Lady Diana Cooper.

Mrs. Stitch appears as a "fixer", a well-connected member of British, and especially London society, who can make things happen for people. This activity is known to all as "The Stitch Service". In Scoop, she is asked to find employment for a novelist by the name of John Courtney Boot, and arranges for him to be sent as a journalist to cover a revolution in Africa. Due to a mixup, the distantly related and quite hapless William Boot is sent instead. When he returns triumphant, the accolades go instead to John Courtenay Boot, who did nothing to deserve them, allowing William Boot to return to his peaceful life writing articles about the British countryside.

In the Sword of Honour trilogy, Mrs. Stitch appears briefly helping Guy Crouchback recover from his ordeal in Africa.

In the novel Put Out More Flags, Mrs. Stitch is referenced when it is discovered Angela Lyne has been drinking profusely. The discovery "... could scarcely have been more surprising had it been Mrs Stitch herself."
