= Scott King =

Scott King may refer to:

- Scott King (artist) (born 1969)
- Scott King (basketball) (born 1992), American basketball coach
- Scott King (ice hockey, born 1967), Canadian ice hockey goaltender who played with the Detroit Red Wings
- Scott King (ice hockey, born 1977), Canadian professional ice hockey player
- Scott L. King, mayor of Gary, Indiana from 1996 to 2006

== See also ==
- Coretta Scott King (1927–2006), American author, activist, and civil rights leader
- Scott-King's Modern Europe, novella published in 1947 by Evelyn Waugh
