= Patey =

Patey is a surname of Anglo-Norman origin, with historical concentrations in the English counties of Devon and Berkshire, and Normandy, France.

Notable people with the surname include:

- Charles George Edward Patey (1811–1881), British admiral and colonial administrator
- Janet Monach Patey (1842–1894), English contralto
- George Edwin Patey (1859–1935), British naval officer
- Herbert A. Patey (1898–1919), English World War I flying ace
- Edward Patey (1915–2005), British clergyman
- Tom Patey (1932–1970), Scottish mountaineer and writer
- Douglas Lane Patey (born 1951), literary scholar and biographer of Evelyn Waugh
- Larry Patey (born 1953), former professional ice hockey centre
- William C. Patey (born c. 1954), British ambassador to Iraq
- Doug Patey (born 1956), retired Canadian ice hockey player
