= Scoop (1987 film) =

1987 British television film

- DVD cover
- Based on: Scoop by Evelyn Waugh
- Screenplay by: William Boyd
- Directed by: Gavin Millar
- Starring: Michael Maloney; Denholm Elliott; Michael Hordern; Herbert Lom
- Music by: Stanley Myers
- Country of origin: United Kingdom
- Original language: English

Production
- Executive producers: Nick Elliott; Patrick Garland
- Producer: Sue Birtwistle
- Production locations: London; Morocco
- Cinematography: Roger Pratt
- Editor: Derek Bain
- Running time: 120 minutes
- Production company: London Weekend Television

Original release
- Network: ITV
- Release: 26 April 1987

Scoop is a 1987 television film directed by Gavin Millar, adapted by William Boyd from the 1938 satirical novel Scoop by Evelyn Waugh. It was produced by Sue Birtwistle with executive producers Nick Elliott and Patrick Garland. Original music was made by Stanley Myers. The story is about a reporter sent to the fictional African state of Ishmaelia by accident.

== Plot ==
In a case of mistaken identity, a naive young columnist for The Daily Beast is sent to cover a war in Ishmaelia. A confused editor, Mr. Salter (Denholm Elliott), acting on the orders of his much feared 'boss', Lord Copper (Donald Pleasence), tells William Boot (Michael Maloney) to cover the ongoing war as the correspondent for the Beast. Boot normally writes about British country life, but is too timid, and worried about losing his job for good, to say otherwise when he is ordered overseas.

Boot is soon up to his neck in intrigue. All the foreign journalists are confined to the capital of Ishmaelia, and they are not allowed to leave unless permission has been given by the Minister of Propaganda. The journalists stick together, drinking and trying to pass time, but they watch each other jealously for signs that someone may have a story to send home. However, Lord Hitchcock, the correspondent for the Daily Brute, is noticeably absent, and this sends the reporters on an insane quest into the desert in the hope of finding the sought-after 'scoop'.

The story is full of bizarre characters: an insane Swedish diplomat who goes berserk when he drinks too much absinthe, the mysterious Mr. Baldwin (Herbert Lom), and a German woman who claims she somehow or other lost her husband. The hapless William Boot appears to be completely out of his depth in the middle of all this chaos and confusion.

== Cast ==
- Denholm Elliott as Mr. Salter
- Michael Hordern as Uncle Theodore
- Herbert Lom as Mr. Baldwin
- Nicola Pagett as Julia Stitch
- Donald Pleasence as Lord Copper
- Renée Soutendijk as Kätchen
- Michael Maloney as William Boot
- Sverre Anker Ousdal as Erik Olafsen
- Jack Shepherd as Corker
