= A Tourist in Africa =

1960 book by Evelyn Waugh

- Author: Evelyn Waugh
- Language: English
- Genre: Travel literature
- Publisher: Chapman & Hall (UK); Little Brown (USA)
- Publication date: 1960
- Publication place: United Kingdom
- Pages: 167

A Tourist in Africa is a travel book by the English writer Evelyn Waugh. It appeared in 1960, many years after his travel writings of the 1930s.

The book is in the form of a diary, describing a tour of East Africa from January to April 1959. Events and sights are described with perception and clarity, and the history associated with a particular place is often discussed.

== Tour ==
=== Departure ===
After a channel crossing, Waugh travels by train from Paris to Genoa. There he meets a friend he has portrayed in fiction as Mrs. Stitch, and they go sightseeing, particularly looking at the marble tombs in the Campo Santo (cemetery).

=== Voyage ===
He travels by sea from Genoa in the Rhodesia Castle. It pauses at Port Said and Aden, and the ship spends five days in Mombasa; he has visited these places before. At Mombasa he visits Fort Jesus, a Portuguese fort, describing its history. Along the coast, he visits the Ruins of Gedi, an Arab town several centuries ago. He sees Mount Kilimanjaro, and visits the town of Pangani, and Zanzibar.

=== Tanganyika ===
At Dar es Salaam in Tanganyika (now part of present-day Tanzania) he leaves the Rhodesia Castle. He visits Bagamoyo, where there are ruined mosques nearby. He describes the town's history, describing an episode there, a dinner-party to welcome the return of Emin Pasha who was rescued by an expedition led by Henry Morton Stanley.

He goes by aeroplane to visit the island of Kilwa Kisiwani and describes the remains of the medieval Arab town, where there are the Sultan's palace and ruined mosques. He takes a trip to the area in the Dodoma Region where there was once a groundnut scheme, and describes this failed project of the late 1940s to cultivate peanuts; he sees the abandoned buildings.

=== The Rhodesias ===
He flies to Salisbury (present-day Harare) in Southern Rhodesia (present-day Zimbabwe) in two stages, staying overnight at Ndola in Northern Rhodesia (present-day Zambia). In Salisbury he stays with friends who live there. He visits Umtali, and Great Zimbabwe, the ruins of an ancient city.

He visits Serima Mission, a church in the diocese of Gwelo, where he meets Fr John Groeber, its architect. He describes the artwork created for the church, which Groeber has encouraged. He flies to Bulawayo, and describes Lobengula's part in the local history. He visits Matobo National Park, where there is the grave of Cecil Rhodes; he discusses Rhodes.

He leaves Salisbury and flies to Cape Town, and returns to Britain in the ship Pendennis Castle.

== Critical reception ==
When the book appeared, Waugh was well established as a writer, and reviewers gave this work careful consideration. However, it was compared unfavourably with his earlier travel writing. Cyril Connolly wrote: "A Tourist in Africa is quite the thinnest piece of book-making which Mr. Waugh has undertaken and must be viewed in relation to the labours on Father Ronald Knox which preceded it."
