= Robbery Under Law =

- Author: Evelyn Waugh
- Publisher: Chapman and Hall
- Publication date: 1939

Robbery Under Law (1939) is a polemic travel book by the British writer Evelyn Waugh. It depicts the Leftist nationalization of the petroleum industry, and the persecution of Catholics in Mexico, under Lázaro Cárdenas, in 1938. Waugh's trip to Mexico was financed by the Cowdray Estate, which held extensive interests in Mexican oil and had suffered heavy losses due to the nationalization.

There is another book of the same name by the author John Armstrong Chaloner.

== Critical reception ==
In contrast to Graham Greene's The Lawless Roads, this work of 1930s travel writing found little favor in its time. One critic called it "polemical in content, rancorous in tone — by much the dreariest of [Waugh's] travel books". However, at least one critic takes the opposite stance, calling it "[The English] language's greatest single traditionalist credo."
