= Reginald Berkeley Cole =

Anglo-Irish settler in Kenya; founder of the Muthaiga Club in Nairobi

Captain The Honourable Reginald Berkeley Cole
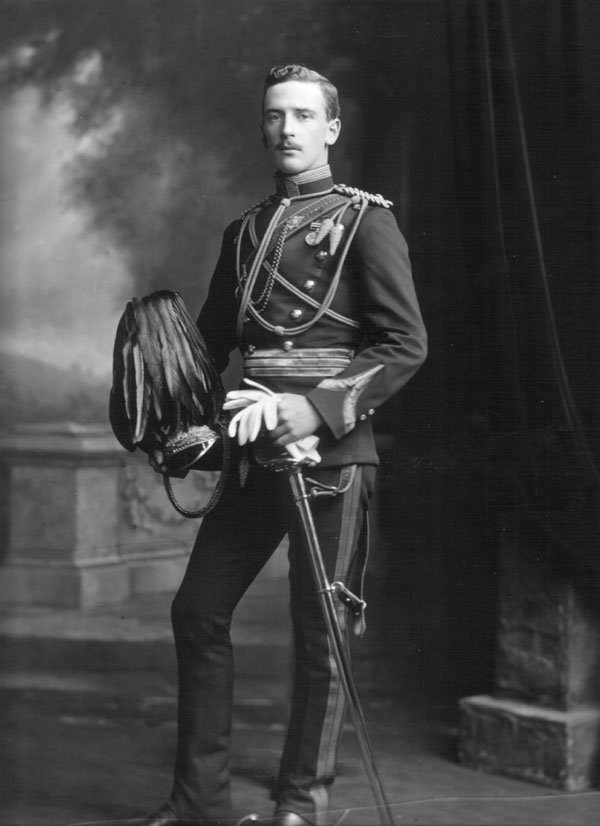
- Reginald Berkeley Cole in the uniform of the 9th Lancers

Member of Legislative Council of Kenya for the Kenya Constituency
- In office 1920–1925

Personal details
- Born: 26 November 1882 Cheshire, England
- Died: 27 April 1925 (aged 42) Naro Moru, Kenya Colony
- Education: Eton College; Trinity College Cambridge
- Occupation: Politician, soldier, farmer, white settler
- Awards: Queen's South Africa Medal 1899-1902, with two bars

Military service
- Allegiance: United Kingdom
- Branch/service: British Army
- Rank: Captain
- Unit: 9th Lancers; East African Mounted Rifles
- Battles/wars: Second Boer War; First World War

Captain Reginald Berkeley Cole (26 November 1882 - 27 April 1925) was a prominent Anglo-Irish aristocrat, soldier, and white settler in Kenya. He is notable as the founder of the Muthaiga Club in Nairobi.

== Biography ==
Cole was born in Northwich, England, the youngest child of Viscount Cole and his wife Charlotte Baird.

He was commissioned into the Royal Sussex Regiment as a second lieutenant on 23 February 1901, during the Second Boer War, and transferred to the 9th Lancers on 19 October. After the war, along with his brother Galbraith, he settled in Kenya. Their sister Florence had in 1899 married Lord Delamere, the pioneer of European settlement in Kenya.

On 18 September 1914, he was promoted to the temporary rank of captain while serving in the East African Campaign of the First World War. He led an irregular unit known as Cole's Scouts, formed of Somali soldiers and soldiers from the 2nd Battalion Loyal Regiment (North Lancashire). The unit was plagued by ill-discipline and friction with regular officers from the Lancashires, and was disbanded in August 1915.

In 1920 he was elected as a Member of the Kenyan Legislative Council and he was re-elected unopposed in 1924.

He was a charismatic figure amongst the early European settlers in Kenya and a close friend of Karen Blixen who later featured him and their mutual friend Denys Finch Hatton in her memoir Out of Africa. He was notable as the founder of the Muthaiga Club, a private Nairobi enclave of the colony's demi-monde.

== Death ==
He died of heart failure at Naro Moru on 27 April 1925 aged 42.
