= Put Out More Flags =

1942 novel by Evelyn Waugh

- First edition
- Author: Evelyn Waugh
- Language: English
- Publisher: Chapman and Hall
- Publication date: 1942
- Publication place: United Kingdom
- Preceded by: Scoop
- Followed by: Brideshead Revisited

Put Out More Flags, the sixth novel by Evelyn Waugh, was first published by Chapman and Hall in 1942. The title comes from the saying of an anonymous Chinese sage, quoted and translated by Lin Yutang in The Importance of Living (1937):

A man getting drunk at a farewell party should strike a musical tone, in order to strengthen his spirit … and a drunk military man should order gallons and put out more flags in order to increase his military splendour.

Dedicated to Randolph Churchill, who found a service commission for Waugh during the Second World War, the story is set in the first year of the war.

It follows the activities of a cast of mostly upper-class British characters, some of them reintroduced from Waugh's earlier satirical novels Decline and Fall, Vile Bodies, and Black Mischief. Facing first the dormant conflict of the Phoney War and then the cataclysmic events of 1940, peacetime lives of boredom and frivolity give way to a sense of purpose and solidarity.

== Plot ==
At the country estate of Malfrey, Barbara Sothill loses her servants, who go off to work in factories, and her husband, who rejoins his reserve regiment. As district billetting officer, she has to find accommodation for evacuees. Her widowed mother in London tries to find an army commission for Barbara's wayward brother Basil Seal, who is sleeping with a Marxist artist called Poppet Green, but Basil fails his interview spectacularly. An aesthete friend of his, the left-wing gay Jewish intellectual Ambrose Silk, looks for a safe niche in the Ministry of Information. Basil's former mistress, the married millionairess Angela Lyne, returns from a solitary holiday in France.

Basil decides to spend the winter quietly in the country with his sister at Malfrey, where he helps her in homing problem children and then gets people to pay him for taking them away again. He meets a lonely bride whose husband is away in the army and sleeps happily with her. Back in London his friend Alastair Trumpington, refusing to try for a commission, joins the army as a private. All alone, her estranged husband Cedric having joined the army, Angela Lyne stays in her flat and takes to the bottle.

The husband of Basil's lover returns and his racket is running out of steam, so he "sells" his problem children and, returning to London, meets by chance an old colleague who gets him a commission in army counter-intelligence. There he shadows allegedly dangerous communists like Poppet Green and her friends. Another old friend who is now the army, Peter Pastmaster, deciding he ought to marry and father an heir, courts the eligible young Molly. Together they find Angela collapsed in the street and, taking her back to her flat, warn Basil about her condition. He responds with sympathy, spends time with her and tries to moderate her drinking.

Angela's husband visits her with their child before embarking with the ill-equipped and ill-organised British forces for Norway, where he dies in combat. For a projected literary magazine, Ambrose Silk writes about his lost love, a Brownshirt named Hans who is now in a Nazi concentration camp. Basil persuades him to leave out Hans' fate, so that the article appears to praise the SA. He then shows it to his boss as evidence of a cell of allegedly dangerous fascists. The publisher is jailed, but Ambrose escapes to neutral Ireland, disguised as a Jesuit priest. Basil takes over his luxurious flat and adds to it Susie, his boss's luscious secretary.

After the total expulsion of the British from the continent, special forces are set up to harass the victorious Germans. Alastair Trumpington joins them and Peter Pastmaster recruits Basil Seal, who marries the widowed Angela and looks forward at last to action: "There's only one serious occupation for a chap now, that's killing Germans. I have an idea I shall rather enjoy it."

== Critical reception ==
Jonathan Raban described the novel as being "as tightly constructed – point and counterpoint – as a baroque fugue", while L. E. Sissman argues that Put Out More Flags represents a turning point in Waugh's writing career: "Waugh somehow fuses the savage, deadly comedy of his earlier books with the ominous seriousness of his later ones."
