= William Boot =

Fictional protagonist of the Evelyn Waugh novel Scoop

William Boot is a fictional journalist who is the protagonist in the 1938 Evelyn Waugh comic novel Scoop.

== Character ==
Boot is the young author of a regular column on country life for a London newspaper named the Daily Beast. His affected style is typified in the notorious sentence "Feather-footed through the plashy fen passes the questing vole". After the Daily Beast's publisher mistakes him for the "real" war correspondent John Boot, William is sent abroad as a foreign correspondent to the fictional African state of Ishmaelia which is on the brink of a civil war. Although he is completely inept, he accidentally gets the 'scoop' of the title.

== Inspiration for character ==
It has been suggested that Waugh based the character of William Boot on his own experiences and on the journalist Bill Deedes; the two had reported together in 1936, trying to cover the Second Italo-Abyssinian War and Deedes arrived in Addis Ababa aged 22 with almost 600 pounds of luggage. Deedes himself said he "spent part of my life brushing aside the charge," but admitted "that my inexperience and naivety as a reporter in Africa might have contributed a few bricks to the building of Boot."

Barring the question of age, a more appropriate model for Boot may be William Beach Thomas who, according to Peter Stothard, "was a quietly successful countryside columnist and literary gent who became a calamitous Daily Mail war correspondent" in the First World War.

Yet another suggested candidate as the model for Boot was the Daily Mail's gardening correspondent for 50 years, Percy Izzard (1877–1968).

== Television portrayals ==
- Michael Maloney played William Boot in a 1987 British television movie entitled Scoop, produced by LWT.
- Harry Worth played the character in a 1972 BBC television series, which was an adaptation of the novel scripted by Barry Took.

== Use as a pseudonym ==
Tom Stoppard sometimes went by the pseudonym William Boot.
