= Galbraith Lowry Egerton Cole =

Anglo-Irish pioneer settler and farmer

Galbraith Lowry Egerton Cole (1881–1929) was an Anglo-Irish pioneer settler and farmer (1905) of the East Africa Protectorate. Part of his Kekopey Ranch on Lake Elementaita, Kenya, where he is buried, is preserved today as the Lake Elementaita Lodge.

== Biography ==
Cole was born into the Ascendancy, Ireland's old Anglo-Irish aristocracy. From a prominent Ulster family, he was the third son of The 4th Earl of Enniskillen (1845-1924) and his wealthy Scottish wife, Charlotte Marion Baird. His younger brother was Reginald Berkeley Cole.

Galbraith Cole was commissioned into the 10th Royal Hussars as a second lieutenant on 7 March 1900, at age 19, and went to South Africa for service in the Second Boer War. He was promoted to lieutenant on 18 September 1901. Following the end of the war in 1902 his regiment went to India, while Cole is reported to have returned home on the SS Saxon which left Cape Town for the United Kingdom in early October 1902.

Resigning from the army due to an injury from the Boer war, he made his way to Kenya where his sister Florence had married the prominent settler Lord Delamere. Cole first tried farming in the area beyond Thomson's Falls in 1905, but he eventually moved to the Lake Elementaita area where his wealthy brother-in-law gave him 30,000 acres (120 km^{2}). This parcel adjoined Delamere's own 100,000-acre (400 km^{2}) farm, Soysambu, on the western side of the lake, between Lakes Naivasha and Nakuru. Cole named his farm "Kekopey Ranch"; the name is supposed to be from a Masaai word meaning "place where green turns white" (a reference to the soda (sodium salts) and diatomite around the hot springs near the lake).

In 1917, he married Lady Eleanor Balfour, niece of Arthur Balfour, the former British Prime Minister. Cole was deported to German East Africa after he shot dead a farm labourer for stealing one of his favourite Merino rams, imported from New Zealand. He returned secretly to Kekopey dressed as a Somali and his mother, the Countess of Enniskillen, pleaded his case with the British government.

Cole's last days were spent in wretched misery. Blind in one eye, using a wheelchair, and in constant pain owing to his rheumatoid arthritis, he shot himself in 1929 at age 48, at his favourite spot, the viewpoint where his memorial now stands.

== Legacy ==
- A large cairn in the shape of an obelisk was erected by Cole's widow on his favorite spot overlooking the lake, not far from the farmhouse. It is believed that his remains were buried nearby. Family revisit this spot every year on 10 October to remember him.
- Twenty years after his death, Cole's widow built a stone chapel, the "Church of Goodwill", on the Old Nakuru Road on what was then part of the Kekopey Estate. This memorialized her husband and also served as a gesture of thanksgiving for the safe return of their two sons, David Lowry Cole (1918-1989; later The 6th Earl of Enniskillen) and Arthur Gerald Cole (b. 1920), from the Second World War.
- Arthur Cole farmed at Kekopey for some years, while Captain David Cole, M.B.E., farmed at Solio Ranch near Naro Moru. Captain Cole was also highly involved in colonial politics in the Colony of Kenya in the very early 1960s. In 1963, David succeeded his uncle in Ireland as the 6th Lord Enniskillen. In 1977, the Kekopey Estate was sold off to a cooperative society and the land divided into small plots for individual shareholders. A brick farmhouse, the main building of Kekopey Ranch and built during 1917–18, is preserved today as the Lake Elementaita Lodge.
