= When the Going Was Good =

1946 travel anthology by Evelyn Waugh

When The Going Was Good
- First edition
- Author: Evelyn Waugh
- Language: English
- Genre: Travel literature
- Publisher: Duckworth
- Publication date: 1946
- Publication place: United Kingdom
- Media type: Print
- Pages: 318
- OCLC: 170209
- LC Class: G469.W3 1946

When The Going Was Good is a 1946 anthology of four travel books written by English author Evelyn Waugh.

== Description ==
The five chapters of the book are fragments from the travel books Labels (1930), Remote People (1931), Ninety-Two Days (1934), and Waugh In Abyssinia (1936). The author writes that these pages are all that he wishes to preserve of the four books.

== Summary ==
=== "A pleasure cruise in 1929" (from Labels) ===
Waugh begins the cruise at Monaco; he writes: "I soon found my fellow passengers and their behaviour in the different places we visited a far more absorbing study than the places themselves." At Naples he visits the Church of Sansevero. The ship stops at Catania in Sicily, and at Haifa. It continues to Port Said, where he and two other passengers "spent two or three evenings investigating the night-town.... We set out... rather apprehensively, with a carefully calculated minimum of money, and life-preservers...."

At Cairo he stays at the Mena House Hotel, and at Sakkara he visits the ancient tombs. He visits Malta and Crete, where he goes to the museum "to admire the barbarities of Minoan culture", and visits Cnossos, where Arthur Evans is reconstructing the palace. Continuing the tour, other places briefly described are Constantinople, Athens, Algiers, Gibraltar, Seville and Lisbon.

=== "A coronation in 1930" (from Remote People) ===
Waugh travels to Addis Ababa in Ethiopia, to attend the coronation of Ras Tafari. At the hotel he meets Irene Ravensdale, a friend. Waugh writes: "It is to Alice in Wonderland that my thoughts recur in seeking some historical parallel for life in Addis Ababa.... the peculiar flavour of galvanised and translated reality...." He attends the ceremony. Delegations afterwards leave wreathes at the mausoleum of Menelik and Zauditu. Waugh and Irene Ravensdale are among about eighty guests invited to lunch with the Emperor.

At the suggestion of an American academic who is attending the events (named "Professor W" in the book: this was Thomas Whittemore), he and Waugh visit Debra Lebanos, where there is a monastery. Waugh returns to Addis Ababa; he accompanies the British consul in Harar, Mr Plowman, to Harar, and there meets the bishop, who recalls Arthur Rimbaud living in the city.

=== "Globe-trotting in 1930–1" (from Remote People) ===
Waugh visits Aden, and studies the buildings and people. He meets a local businessman, and a walk with him turns out to involve strenuous rock-climbing. Waugh has an audience with the Sultan of Lahej. He sails to Zanzibar, where he stays at the English Club; he finds the heat intolerable. He visits Pemba Island. He leaves for Kenya; at Nairobi he is a temporary member of the Muthaiga Country Club, and goes to the races with other members. He drives through the Rift Valley, admiring the scenery: "all around for immense distances successive crests of highland"; at Lake Naivasha he stays with a farmer at Njoro. He goes to Uganda and stays at Jinja.

Conscious of an inclination to return to Europe, Waugh does not pause during the remaining journey. At Kigoma he travels on a steamer on Lake Tanganyika, enduring a thunderstorm, to Albertville (now Kalemie). At Kabalo he travels to Bukama along the river by paddle-steamer, then by train to Elizabethville. There is a six-day train journey to Cape Town, from where he sails to Southampton.

=== "A journey to Brazil in 1932" (from Ninety-two Days) ===
Waugh sails to Georgetown in South America, where he prepares a journey through Guyana. He accompanies Mr Bain, the District Commissioner, for part of the way, by train to New Amsterdam, up the Berbice River by paddle-steamer for three days, and on horseback through grassland and bush for six days to Bain's office in the only house at Kurupukari, a clearing by the Essequibo River. Across the river, Waugh continues with local assistants, until they reach the Ireng River at the border with Brazil; Waugh stays for ten days at the mission St. Ignatius.

After another four days' travelling Waugh crosses the Branco River and arrives at Boa Vista. He is disappointed: "The Boa Vista of my imagination had come to grief.... All that extravagant and highly improbable expectation had been obliterated like a sand castle beneath the encroaching tide." He stays at the Benedictine Mission. He abandons his idea of continuing to Manaos, noticing that people are often in fever. "It seemed to me a poor gamble to risk becoming semi-invalid for life for the dubious interest of a voyage down the Rio Branco." He recrosses the river to begin the return journey.

=== "A war in 1935" (from Waugh in Abyssinia) ===
Waugh is in Addis Abada as a war correspondent to cover the Second Italo-Ethiopian War. He is one of several journalists there including Patrick Balfour. There is nothing to report, so he travels with Balfour to Dirre-Dowa and Jijiga; there he finds minor stories which are ignored by his newspaper in London, who tells him he has missed something important in Addis Ababa. Returning there, he finds there are more journalists: "They showed almost every diversity which the human species produces." An announcement from the palace, that Italy has dropped bombs on Adowa, turns out to be a mistake.

An attempt to reach Dessye fails because he does not have permission; he later successfully arrives. There is nothing to do. "Several journalists had already been recalled... now a general retreat began." His newspaper dismisses him, and he is able to fulfil his wish to spend Christmas in Bethlehem.
