= Black Mischief =

1932 novel by Evelyn Waugh

- First edition
- Author: Evelyn Waugh
- Language: English
- Genre: Comedy
- Publisher: Chapman and Hall
- Publication date: 1932
- Publication place: United Kingdom
- Media type: Print
- Pages: 238 (2000 Penguin Classics edition)

Black Mischief is Evelyn Waugh's third novel, published in 1932. Expanded from a novella, 'Seth', the novel chronicles the efforts of the British-educated Emperor Seth, assisted by a fellow Oxford University graduate, Basil Seal, to modernise his Empire, the fictional African island of Azania, located in the Indian Ocean off the eastern coast of Africa.

The novel was written while Waugh was a house guest at Madresfield Court in Worcestershire. The old nursery had been converted into a writing room for Waugh. The novel is dedicated to the Lygon sisters, who had the run of the place (their father, William Lygon, 7th Earl Beauchamp, having been forced into exile in 1931 under threat of prosecution for his homosexuality), and posed for some of the drawings Waugh did for the first edition.

When Black Mischief was published in 1932, the editor of the Catholic journal The Tablet, Ernest Oldmeadow, launched a violent attack on the book and its author, stating that the novel was "a disgrace to anybody professing the Catholic name". Waugh, wrote Oldmeadow, "was intent on elaborating a work outrageous not only to Catholic but to ordinary standards of modesty". Waugh made no public rebuttal of these charges; an open letter to the Cardinal Archbishop of Westminster was prepared, but on the advice of Waugh's friends was not sent.

The novel has been published in the United Kingdom by Penguin Classics (ISBN 9780141183985), and in the United States by Back Bay Books (ISBN 0316917338).

== Plot synopsis ==
After winning a civil war against his late father Seyid (who is unfortunately eaten by his own soldiers), Seth, Oxford-educated emperor of the fictional nation of Azania, makes it his goal to modernise his country. He recruits Basil Seal, a shiftless college friend and heir to an English political family in the country after stealing his mother’s jewellery to pay for his ticket, to preside over the newly established Ministry of Modernization, with the help of Krikor Yokoumian, a successful Armenian shopkeeper and fixer. Basil enters into the society of the capital, Debra Dowa. This consists mainly of various heads of society and government, including the head of the Army, General Connolly. Connolly was a former Irish game-warden who had taken a local wife, whom he refers to as "Black Bitch", as the Duke & Duchess of Ukaka; the Minister of the Interior Viscount Boaz, and the Earl of Ngumo; the representatives of the British diplomatic corps, interested only in the legation garden and gossip from home at the expense of any interest in local affairs, headed by a failed career diplomat Sir Samson Courteney; Monsieur Ballon, the French freemason consul, determined that all actions on the part of the British are in fact coded pieces of a great master plan and his wife, generally believed to be having an affair with General Connolly after French agents overhear a game of consequences at a party; and two members of the RSPCA, Dame Mildred Porch and Miss Sarah Tin, who the Azanians believe are there to assist in creating more efficient ways to be cruel to animals.

After a period of rapid but haphazard modernisation, including renaming the street the Anglican Cathedral is on "Place Marie Stopes", Emperor Seth launches his own currency. This last act is the start of his downfall. Unbeknownst to Seth and the Ministry, the French consul Ballon plans a coup d'état. At a "Birth Control Parade" organised by Seth, Ballon and several religious leaders overthrow the Emperor and install his senile uncle Achon. The British nationals in Debra Dowa flee the town to impose on Sir Samson’s grudging hospitality. Blind, senile Achon dies upon coronation, having spent 50 years in prison after supposedly being eaten by lions, and Seth dies in hiding, killed by his own Minister, who is in turn killed on Basil’s orders. Basil attends Seth's funeral feast and discovers afterwards that he has eaten the stewed remains of his girlfriend Prudence Courteney, the coddled daughter of the British Minister, whose plane had vanished after the evacuation of the British compound. With no heir to the monarchy, the League of Nations steps in and claims the country as a League of Nations mandate. Basil returns to England and disturbs his old friends because he has become serious.
