= Douglas Lane Patey =

American academic (born 1952)

- Born: 1953 (age 72–73); Corning, New York, U.S.
- Title: Sophia Smith Professor of English Language and Literature

Academic background
- Education: Hamilton College, A.B. University of Virginia, M.A. English; University of Virginia, M.A. Philosophy University of Virginia, Ph.D.
- Thesis: Concepts of Probability in the Renaissance and the Augustan Age (1979)

Academic work
- Discipline: English
- Sub-discipline: 18th-century British literature
- Institutions: Smith College

Douglas Lane Patey (born 1952) is an American academic and professor of English at Smith College in Northampton, Massachusetts. His area of expertise is 18th-century British literature.

== Early life and education ==
Patey was raised in Corning, New York.

Patey received an A.B. from Hamilton College. He received MA in English from the University of Virginia in 1973. His thesis was Poets and Painters, and Two Versions of Meredith's Love in the Valley. He received an MA in philosophy in 1977, also from the University of Virginia. His thesis was Intentionalism in Literary Aesthetics. He received a PhD from the University of Virginia in 1979. His dissertation was Concepts of Probability in the Renaissance and the Augustan Age.

== Career ==
Patey became an assistant professor at Smith College in 1979 and a professor in 1991. In 2003, he became the Sophia Smith Professor of English Language and Literature at Smith College.

In 1994, Patey received a Guggenheim fellowship in English. He has also received fellowships from the National Endowment for the Humanities and the American Council of Learned Societies.

== Selected publications ==
=== Books ===
- Probability and Literary Form: Philosophic Theory and Literary Practice in the Augustan Age. Cambridge: Cambridge University Press, 1984. ISBN 0-521-25456-6
- The Life of Evelyn Waugh: A Critical Biography. Blackwell Critical Biographies 8. Oxford: Blackwell. 1998. ISBN 0-631-18933-5
- Editor, Of Human Bondage: Historical Perspectives on Addiction. Northampton, MA: Smith College Studies in History, vol. 52 (2003).
- Editor, Evelyn Waugh: Ninety-Two Days, Vol. 22 of The Collected Works of Evelyn Waugh. Oxford: Oxford University Press, 2021.

=== Articles ===
- Patey, Douglas Lane (May 1986). "Art and Integrity: Concepts of Self in Alexander Pope and Edward Young". Modern Philology. 83 (4): 364–378. doi:10.1086/391493. S2CID 162317351.
- Patey, Douglas Lane (January 1986). "Johnson's Refutation of Berkeley: Kicking the Stone Again". Journal of the History of Ideas. 47 (1): 139–145. doi:10.2307/2709600. JSTOR 2709600.
- Patey, Douglas Lane (1986). "'Love Deny'd': Pope and the Allegory of Despair". Eighteenth-Century Studies. 20 (1): 34–55. doi:10.2307/2738592. JSTOR 2738592.
- Patey, Douglas Lane (1988). "The Eighteenth Century Invents the Canon". Modern Language Studies. 18 (1): 17–37. doi:10.2307/3194698. JSTOR 3194698.
- Patey, Douglas Lane (1991). "Swift's Satire on 'Science' and the Structure of Gulliver's Travels". ELH. 58 (4): 809–839. doi:10.2307/2873283. JSTOR 2873283.
- Patey, Douglas Lane (1992). "Hegel on Causality: Toward an Understanding of the Absolute Relation". Idealistic Studies. 22 (2): 179–188. doi:10.5840/idstudies199222223.
- Patey, Douglas Lane (1993). "'Aesthetics' and the Rise of Lyric in the Eighteenth Century". Studies in English Literature, 1500-1900. 33 (3): 587–608. doi:10.2307/451015. JSTOR 451015.
- Patey, Douglas Lane (Spring 1999). "Anne Finch, John Dyer, and the Georgic Syntax of Nature". The Scriblerian and the Kit-Cats. 31 (2): 179. ProQuest 1308681499.
- Patey, Douglas Lane (August 1999). "The Boundaries of Fiction: History and the Eighteenth-Century British Novel". Modern Philology. 97 (1): 124–128. doi:10.1086/492819.
- Patey, Douglas Lane (1 May 2000). "Evelyn Waugh's Brideshead Revisited". Logos. 3 (2): 9–30. doi:10.1353/log.2000.0017. S2CID 170699242.
- Ross, Trevor (Fall 2000). "'Pure Poetry': Cultural Capital and the Rejection of Classicism". The Scriblerian and the Kit-Cats. 33 (1): 31. ProQuest 1308685776.
- Patey, Douglas Lane (Winter 1994). "Penology, Pride, and a Historical Original for Sir Wilfred Lucas-Dockery in Decline and Fall". Evelyn Waugh Newsletter and Studies. 28 (3): 4–7. ProQuest 762398298.
- Patey, Douglas Lane (2005). "Policing the Boundaries of "Nature"". Eighteenth-Century Studies. 38 (4): 686–689. doi:10.1353/ecs.2005.0041. S2CID 144973209. Project MUSE 184718.
- Patey, Douglas Lane (2009). "Digressing toward Truth". Huntington Library Quarterly. 72 (3): 431–435. doi:10.1525/hlq.2009.72.3.431. JSTOR 10.1525/hlq.2009.72.3.431. ProQuest 215265269.
- Patey, Douglas Lane (1 September 2012). "Paranoia and Fiction". Eighteenth-Century Life. 36 (3): 87–91. doi:10.1215/00982601-1672844. S2CID 144378294.

=== As editor ===
- Patey, D. L., and Keegan, T., eds. Augustan Studies: Essays in Honor of Irvin Ehrenpreis. Newark: University of Delaware Press, 1985. ISBN 0-87413-272-X
- Patey, D. L. "Of Human Bondage: Historical Perspectives on Addiction". Smith College Studies in History vol. 52. (2003) ISBN 9780873910538
- Waugh, Evelyn Ninety-Two Days. The Complete Works of Evelyn Waugh vol. 22. Douglas Lane Patey, ed. Oxford: Oxford University Press, 2021. ISBN 9780198724186
