= Scott-King's Modern Europe =

1947 novella by Evelyn Waugh

- First book edition
- Author: Evelyn Waugh
- Language: English
- Publisher: Cornhill Magazine; Chapman & Hall (book)
- Publication date: 1947
- Publication place: United Kingdom
- Preceded by: Brideshead Revisited (1945)
- Followed by: The Loved One (1948)

Scott-King's Modern Europe, published in 1947, is a novella by Evelyn Waugh, sometimes called A Sojourn in Neutralia. It was first published in an abridged form in the Cornhill Magazine in 1947, and then by Chapman & Hall, also in 1947. The first American edition, by Little, Brown, appeared in 1949.

== Plot ==
Set shortly after the end of the Second World War, the story's central character is Scott-King, a middle-aged schoolmaster who for twenty-one years has taught classical languages at Granchester, an English public school which was his own old school. Cautious and monosyllabic, he is described by Waugh as "a praiser of the past and a lover of exact scholarship", and is characterized as representing the old-fashioned virtues of honesty, decency, sanity, and, ultimately, heroism.

During his summer vacation, Scott-King visits Neutralia, a totalitarian republic ruled by a military dictator who was able to keep his country from becoming embroiled in the recent World War. The occasion for Scott-King's visit to Simona, the capital city, is that by publishing an English language translation of a long Latin poem by Bellorius, a minor 17th-century Neutralian poet, followed by a monograph on Bellorius himself, he has come to be seen as a leading authority on the work. He has therefore been invited by the government of Neutralia to take part in a scholarly conference marking the poet's tercentenary. Unhappily, Scott-King does not think to inform the British government of his visit.

At the same time as the Bellorius Tercentenary, Neutralia is hosting several other events, including a large philatelic conference and an international gathering of women athletes, and in Simona Scott-King meets a variety of remarkable characters. One of these, a scholar from Switzerland, is murdered, and Scott-King is tricked into laying a wreath for a questionable hero and unveiling a statue which is not what it seems, causing him to flee Simona disguised as a nun. On arrival at a Mediterranean seaport, he finds himself surrounded by anarchists, monarchists, Trotskyites, prostitutes, ballet dancers, former Gestapo officers, and Vichy collaborators. After a long sea journey, he arrives without his passport at a camp for Jewish illegal immigrants in the British Mandate for Palestine, where he is treated with suspicion until he is recognized by an old boy of his school and is thus able to establish his true identity.

== Message ==
It seems at first ironic that the life work of Bellorius was in describing a fictional utopian island in the New World. However, the moral of Scott-King's Modern Europe is that attempts to create a rational Utopia should be expected to result in a repressive dystopia. The conclusion of the story is the decision by Scott-King that "It would be very wicked indeed to do anything to fit a boy for the modern world."

A satire on post-1945 totalitarianism, the story sets out in particular Waugh's attitudes towards communism in the Balkans and is plainly also an attack on the drabness of the continent following the Second World War.

== Background ==
In 1937, W. H. Auden, Stephen Spender, and Nancy Cunard distributed a questionnaire to writers about the Spanish Civil War, the results being published by the Left Review as "Authors Take Sides on the Spanish War". Waugh replied "If I were a Spaniard, I would be fighting for General Franco. As an Englishman I am not in the predicament of choosing between two evils. I am not a Fascist, nor shall I become one unless it were the only alternative to Marxism."

Waugh gathered most of his material for Scott-King's Modern Europe from a trip he made to Franco's Spain in the summer of 1946 with Douglas Woodruff, editor of The Tablet, to attend events marking the 400th anniversary of the death of Francisco de Vitoria, claimed by some as the father of international law. He changed many details, including the country's name, as Spain's reactionary government was one he favoured more than he did most governments.
