= Evelyn Waugh =

British writer and journalist (1903–1966)

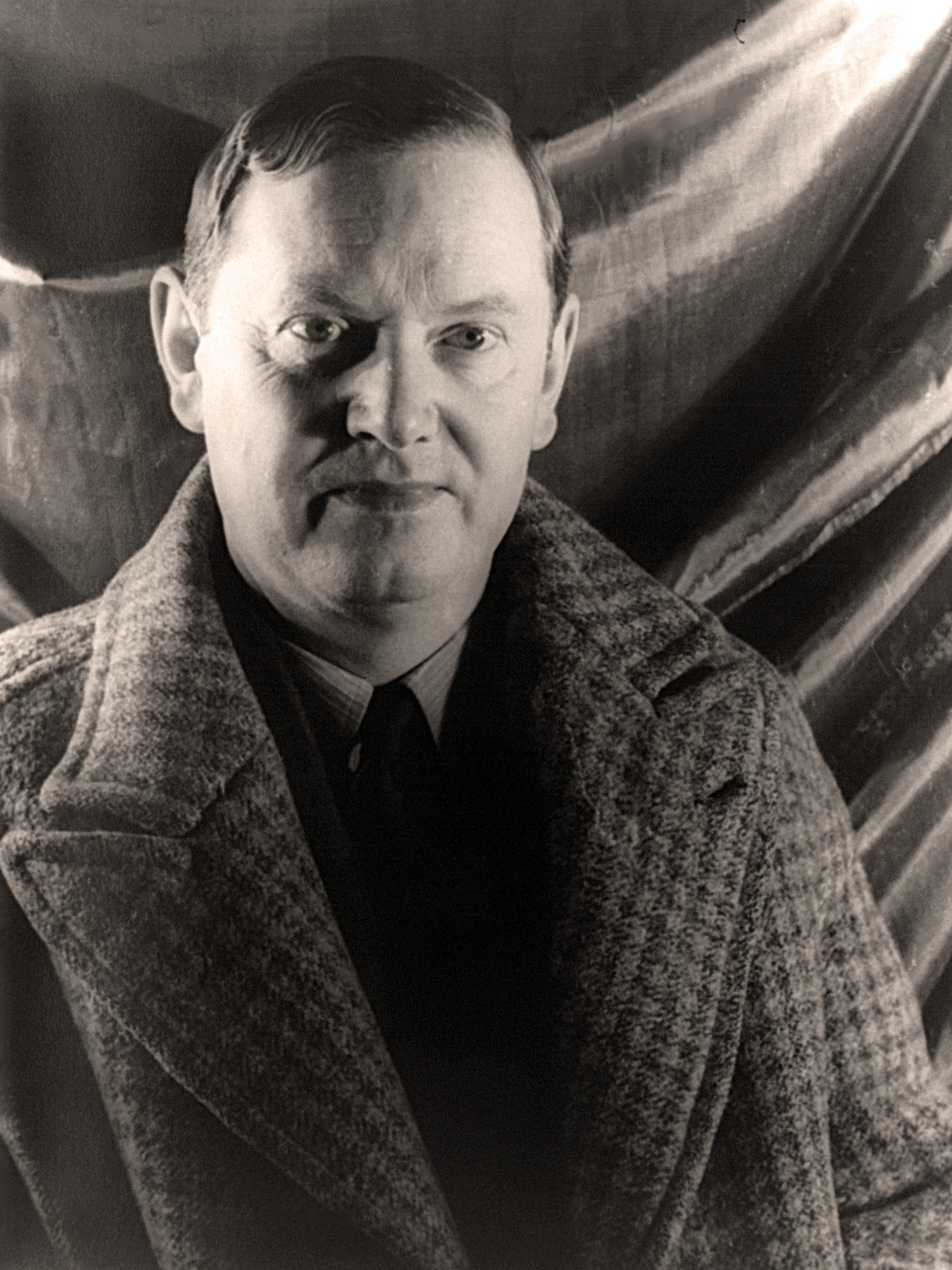
- Waugh, circa 1940
- Born: Arthur Evelyn St. John Waugh; 28 October 1903; West Hampstead, London, England
- Died: 10 April 1966 (aged 62); Combe Florey, Somerset, England
- Education: Hertford College, Oxford
- Occupation: Writer
- Spouses: Evelyn Gardner (m. 1928; ann. 1936) Laura Herbert (m. 1937)
- Children: 7, including Auberon Waugh
- Writing career
- Period: 1923–1964
- Genres: Novel, biography, short story, travelogue, autobiography, satire, humour

Arthur Evelyn St. John Waugh (/ˈiːvlɪn ˈsɪndʒən ˈwɔː/; 28 October 1903 – 10 April 1966) was an English writer of novels, biographies, and travel books; he was also a prolific journalist and book reviewer. His most famous works include the early satires Decline and Fall (1928) and A Handful of Dust (1934), the novel Brideshead Revisited (1945), and the Second World War trilogy Sword of Honour (1952–1961). He is recognised as one of the great prose stylists of the English language in the 20th century.

Waugh, the son of a publisher, was educated at Lancing College and then at Hertford College, Oxford. He worked briefly as a schoolmaster before he became a full-time writer. As a young man, he acquired many fashionable and aristocratic friends and developed a taste for country house society.

He travelled extensively in the 1930s, often as a special newspaper correspondent; he reported from Abyssinia at the time of the 1935 Italian invasion. Waugh served in the British armed forces throughout the Second World War, first in the Royal Marines and then in the Royal Horse Guards. He was a perceptive writer who used the experiences and the wide range of people whom he encountered in his works of fiction, generally to humorous effect. Waugh's detachment was such that he fictionalised his own mental breakdown which occurred in the early 1950s.

Waugh converted to Catholicism in 1930 after his first marriage failed. His traditionalist stance led him to strongly oppose all attempts to reform the Church, and the changes by the Second Vatican Council (1962–65) greatly disturbed his sensibilities, especially the introduction of the vernacular Mass. That blow to his religious traditionalism, his dislike for the welfare state culture of the postwar world, and the decline of his health all darkened his final years, but he continued to write. He displayed to the world a mask of indifference, but he was capable of great kindness to those whom he considered his friends. After his death in 1966, he acquired a following of new readers through the film and television versions of his works, such as the television serial Brideshead Revisited (1981).

== Family background ==
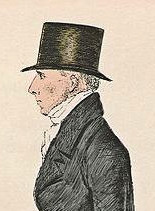
Lord Cockburn, the Scottish judge, was one of Waugh's great-great-grandfathers.

Arthur Evelyn St. John Waugh was born on 28 October 1903 to Arthur Waugh and Catherine Charlotte Raban. Distinguished relatives included Lord Cockburn, a leading Scottish advocate and judge, William Morgan, a pioneer of actuarial science and Philip Henry Gosse, a natural scientist who became notorious through his depiction as a religious fanatic in his son Edmund's memoir Father and Son. Among ancestors bearing the Waugh name, Alexander Waugh was a minister in the Secession Church of Scotland who helped found the London Missionary Society and was one of the leading Nonconformist preachers of his day. His grandson Alexander Waugh was a country medical practitioner, who bullied his wife and children and became known in the Waugh family as "the Brute". The elder of Alexander's two sons, born in 1866, was Evelyn's father, Arthur Waugh.

After attending Sherborne School and New College, Oxford, Arthur Waugh began a career in publishing and as a literary critic. In 1902 he became managing director of Chapman and Hall, publishers of the works of Charles Dickens. He had married Catherine Raban in 1893; their first son Alexander Raban Waugh (always known as Alec) was born on 8 July 1898. Alec Waugh later became a novelist of note. At the time of his birth the family were living in North London, at Hillfield Road, West Hampstead where, on 28 October 1903, the couple's second son was born, "in great haste before Dr Andrews could arrive", Catherine recorded. On 7 January 1904 the boy was christened Arthur Evelyn St John Waugh but was known in the family and in the wider world as Evelyn. (Note: Some biographers have recorded his forenames as "Evelyn Arthur St. John", but Waugh gives the "Arthur Evelyn" order in A Little Learning, p. 27. The confusion may in part be attributable to differences in the forename order between Waugh's birth and death certificates. The former specifies "Arthur Evelyn St. John", and the latter "Evelyn Arthur St. John".)

== Childhood ==
=== Golders Green and Heath Mount ===
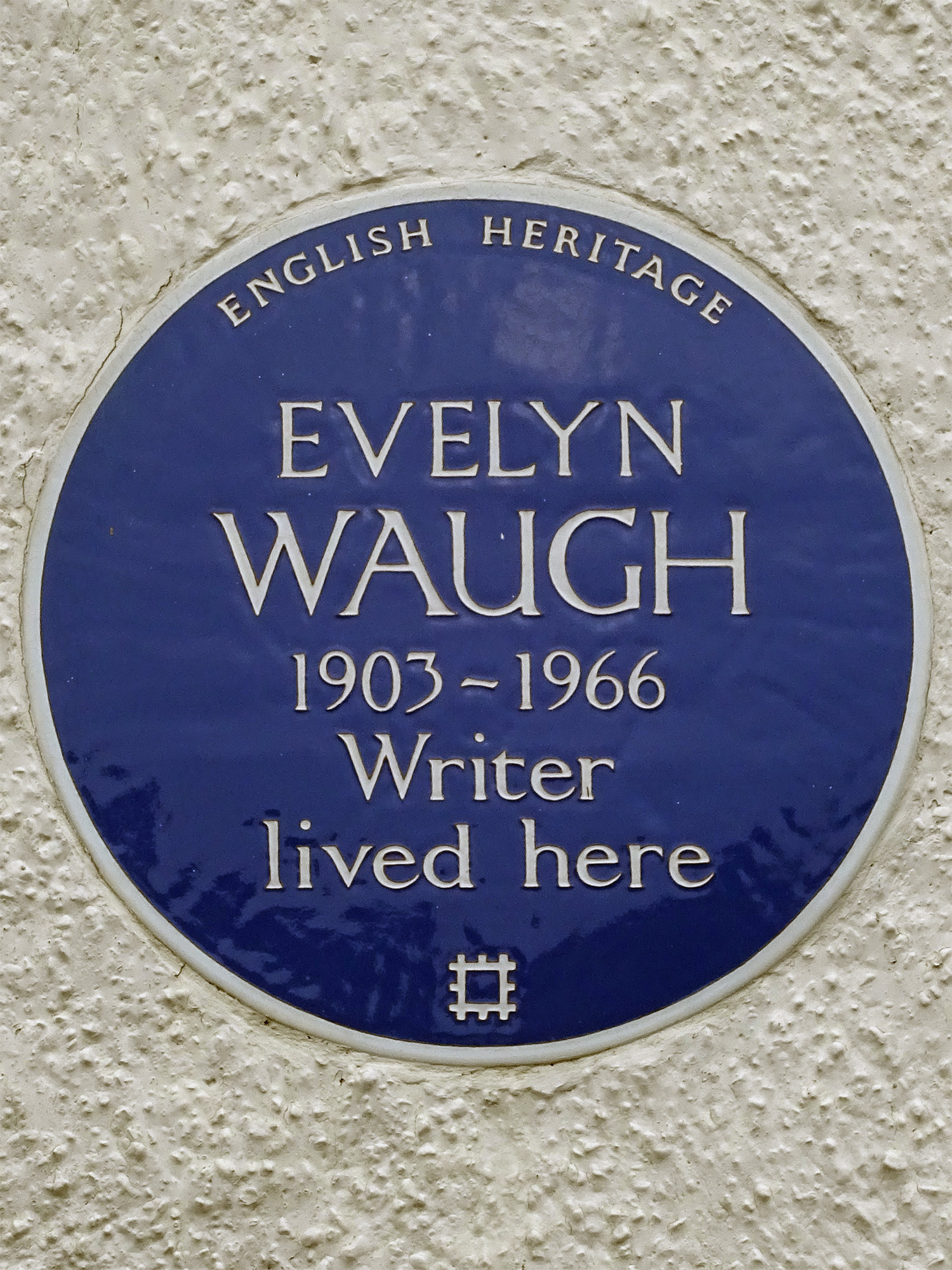
Blue plaque at 145 North End Road, Golders Green, London

In 1907, the Waugh family left Hillfield Road for Underhill, a house that Arthur had built in North End Road, Hampstead, close to Golders Green, then a semi-rural area of dairy farms, market gardens and bluebell woods. Evelyn received his first school lessons at home, from his mother, with whom he formed a particularly close relationship; his father, Arthur Waugh, was a more distant figure, whose close bond with his elder son, Alec, was such that Evelyn often felt excluded. In September 1910, Evelyn began as a day pupil at Heath Mount preparatory school. By then, he was a lively boy of many interests, who already had written and completed "The Curse of the Horse Race", his first story. A positive influence on his writing was a schoolmaster, Aubrey Ensor. Waugh spent six relatively contented years at Heath Mount; on his own assertion he was "quite a clever little boy" who was seldom distressed or overawed by his lessons. Physically pugnacious, Evelyn was inclined to bully weaker boys; among his victims was the future society photographer Cecil Beaton, who never forgot the experience.

Outside school, he and other neighbourhood children performed plays, usually written by Waugh. On the basis of the xenophobia fostered by the genre books of invasion literature, that the Germans were about to invade Britain, Waugh organised his friends into the "Pistol Troop", who built a fort, went on manoeuvres and paraded in makeshift uniforms. In 1914, after the First World War began, Waugh and other boys from the Boy Scout Troop of Heath Mount School were sometimes employed as messengers at the War Office; Evelyn loitered about the War Office in hope of glimpsing Lord Kitchener, but never did.

Family holidays usually were spent with the Waugh aunts at Midsomer Norton in Somerset, in a house lit with oil lamps, a time that Waugh recalled with delight, many years later. At Midsomer Norton, Evelyn became deeply interested in high Anglican church rituals, the initial stirrings of the spiritual dimension that later dominated his perspective of life, and he served as an altar boy at the local Anglican church. During his last year at Heath Mount, Waugh established and edited The Cynic school magazine. (Note: In 1993 a blue plaque commemorating Waugh's residence was installed at Underhill, which by then had become 145 North End Road, Golders Green.)

=== Lancing ===
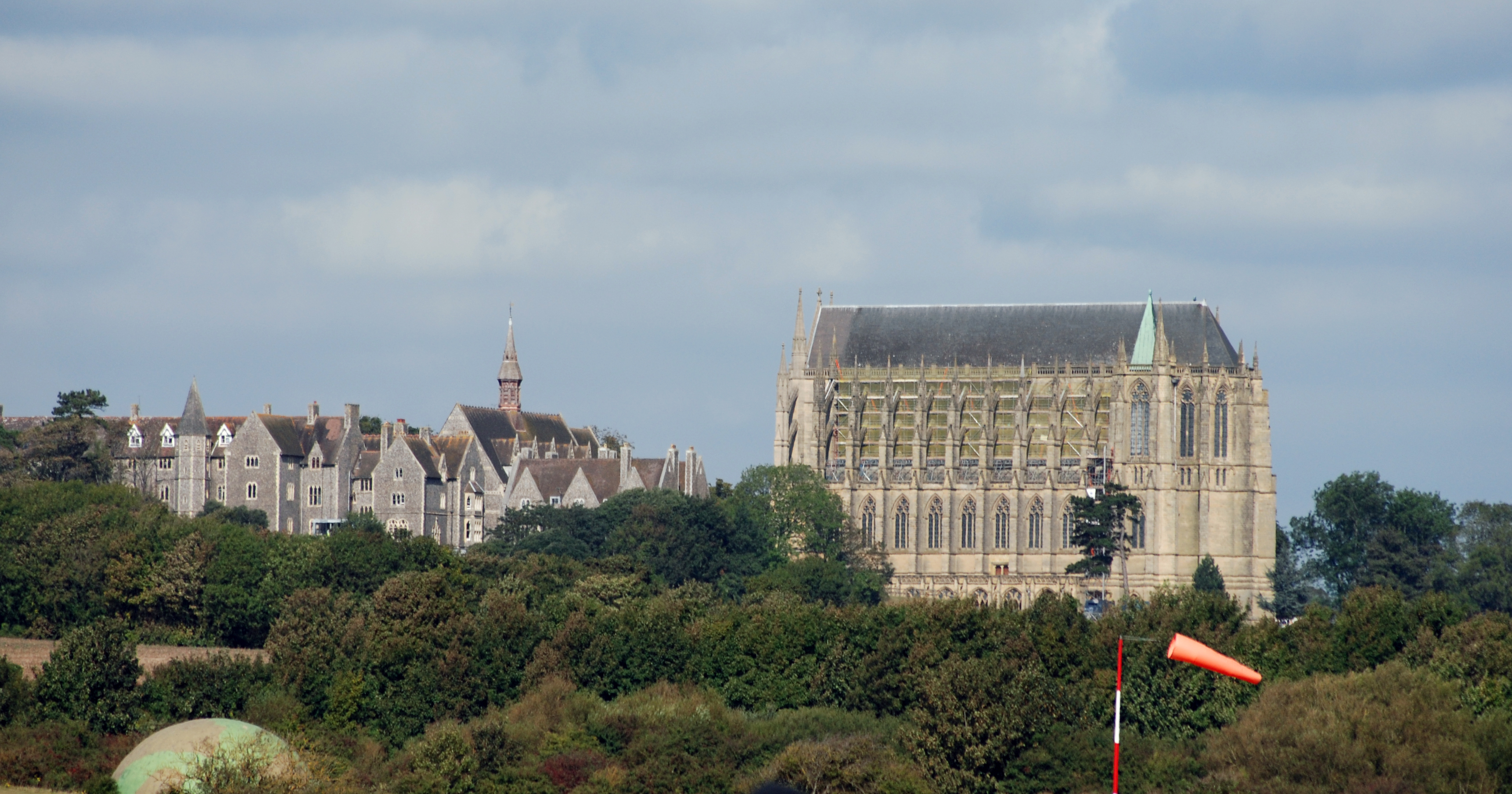
Lancing College Chapel in West Sussex

Like his father before him, Alec Waugh went to school at Sherborne. It was presumed by the family that Evelyn would follow, but in 1915, the school asked Evelyn's elder brother Alec to leave after a homosexual relationship came to light. Alec departed Sherborne for military training as an officer, and, while awaiting confirmation of his commission, wrote The Loom of Youth (1917), a novel of school life, which alluded to homosexual friendships at a school that was recognisably Sherborne. The public sensation caused by Alec's novel so offended the school that it became impossible for Evelyn to go there. In May 1917, much to his annoyance, he was sent to Lancing College, which he considered an inferior school.

Waugh soon overcame his initial aversion to Lancing, settled in and established his reputation as an aesthete. In November 1917 his essay "In Defence of Cubism" (1917) was accepted by and published in the arts magazine Drawing and Design; it was his first published article. Within the school, he became mildly subversive, mocking the school's cadet corps and founding the Corpse Club "for those who were bored stiff". The end of the war saw the return to the school of younger masters such as J. F. Roxburgh, who encouraged Waugh to write and predicted a great future for him. (Note: A biography of Roxburgh (who went on to be first headmaster of Stowe School) was the last work given a literary review by Waugh, in The Observer on 17 October 1965.) Another mentor, Francis Crease, taught Waugh the arts of calligraphy and decorative design; some of the boy's work was good enough to be used by Chapman and Hall on book jackets.

In his later years at Lancing, Waugh achieved success as a house captain, editor of the school magazine and president of the debating society, and won numerous art and literature prizes. He also shed most of his religious beliefs. He started a novel of school life, untitled, but abandoned the effort after writing around 5,000 words. He ended his schooldays by winning a scholarship to read Modern History at Hertford College, Oxford, and left Lancing in December 1921.

== Oxford ==
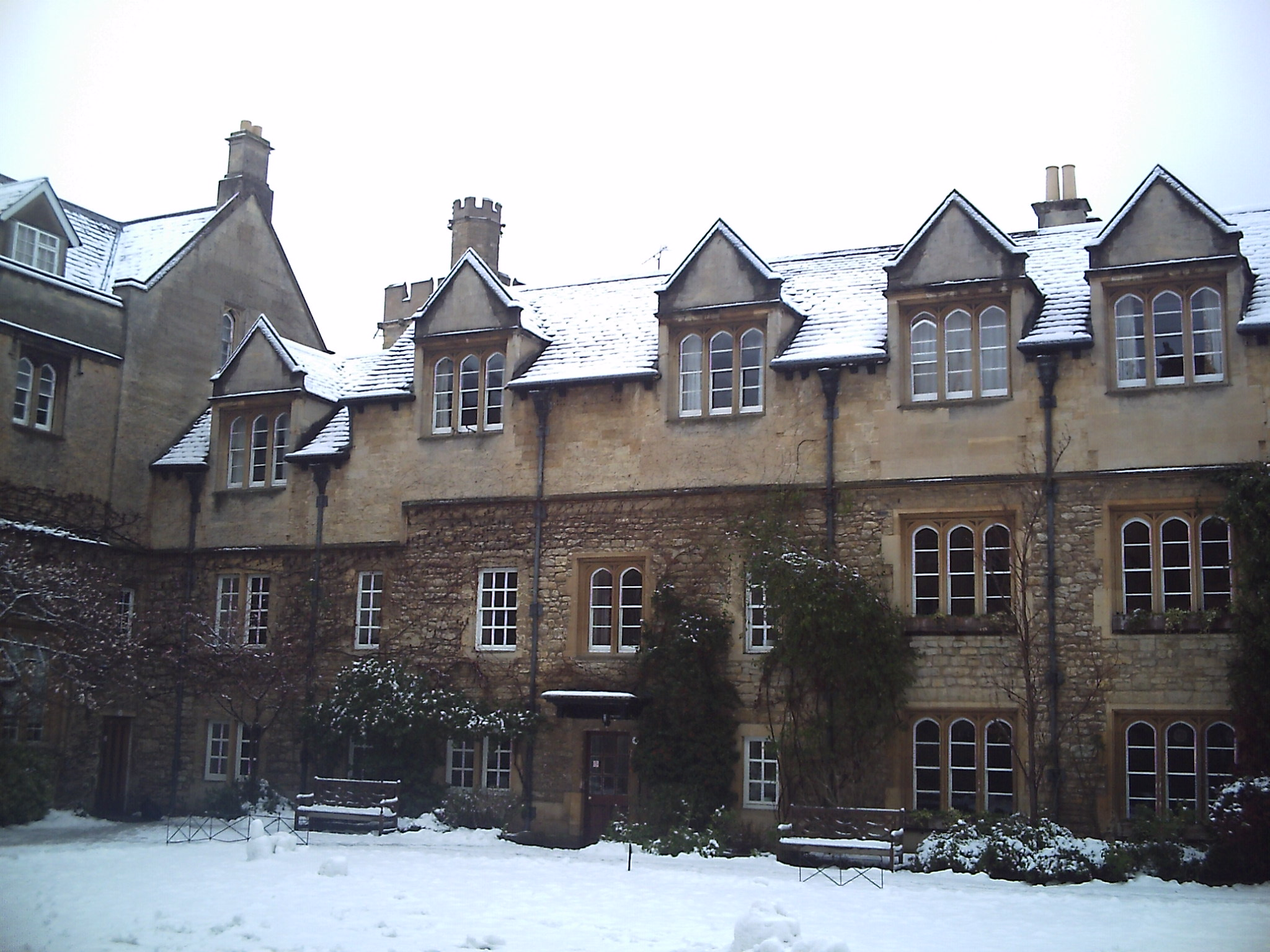
Hertford College, Oxford; Old Quadrangle

Waugh arrived in Oxford in January 1922. He was soon writing to old friends at Lancing about the pleasures of his new life; he informed Tom Driberg: "I do no work here and never go to Chapel". During his first two terms, he generally followed convention; he smoked a pipe, bought a bicycle, and gave his maiden speech at the Oxford Union, opposing the motion that "This House would welcome Prohibition". Waugh wrote reports on Union debates for both Oxford magazines, Cherwell and Isis, and he acted as a film critic for Isis. He also became secretary of the Hertford College debating society, "an onerous but not honorific post", he told Driberg. Although Waugh tended to regard his scholarship as a reward for past efforts rather than a stepping-stone to future academic success, he did sufficient work in his first two terms to pass his "History Previous", an essential preliminary examination.

The arrival in Oxford in October 1922 of the sophisticated Etonians Harold Acton and Brian Howard changed Waugh's Oxford life. Acton and Howard rapidly became the centre of an avant-garde circle known as the Hypocrites' Club (Waugh was the secretary of the club), whose artistic, social and homosexual values Waugh adopted enthusiastically; he later wrote: "It was the stamping ground of half my Oxford life". He began drinking heavily, and embarked on the first of several homosexual relationships, the most lasting of which were with Hugh Lygon, Richard Pares and Alastair Graham (potentially the inspiration for the fictional character Lord Sebastian Flyte in the novel Brideshead Revisited, though this is rather disputed and was most likely a blend of numerous individuals including Stephen Tennant). Waugh was also a close friend of David Talbot Rice and his wife Tamara Talbot Rice - who he described as "the clever Russian" in his memoir.

He continued to write reviews and short stories for the university journals, and developed a reputation as a talented graphic artist, but formal study largely ceased. This neglect led to a bitter feud between Waugh and his history tutor, C. R. M. F. Cruttwell, dean (and later principal) of Hertford College. When Cruttwell advised him to mend his ways, Waugh responded in a manner which, he admitted later, was "fatuously haughty"; from then on, relations between the two descended into mutual hatred. Waugh continued the feud long after his Oxford days by using Cruttwell's name in his early novels for a succession of ludicrous, ignominious or odious minor characters. (Note: "Cruttwell" is a brutal burglar in Decline and Fall, a snobbish Member of Parliament in Vile Bodies, a social parasite in Black Mischief, a disreputable osteopath in A Handful of Dust and a salesman with a fake tan in Scoop. The homicidal Loveday in "Mr. Loveday's Little Outing" was originally "Mr. Cruttwell". See Hastings, pp. 173, 209, 373; Stannard, Vol. I pp. 342, 389)

Waugh's dissipated lifestyle continued into his final Oxford year, 1924. A letter written that year to a Lancing friend, Dudley Carew, hints at severe emotional pressures: "I have been living very intensely these last three weeks. For the last fortnight I have been nearly insane.... I may perhaps one day in a later time tell you some of the things that have happened". He did just enough work to pass his final examinations in the summer of 1924 with a third-class. However, as he had begun at Hertford in the second term of the 1921–22 academic year, Waugh had completed only eight terms' residence when he sat his finals, rather than the nine required under the university's statutes. His poor results led to the loss of his scholarship, which made it impossible for him to return to Oxford for a final term, so he left without a degree.

Back at home, Waugh began a novel, The Temple at Thatch, and worked with some of his fellow Hypocrites on a film, The Scarlet Woman, which was shot partly in the gardens at Underhill. He spent much of the rest of the summer in the company of Alastair Graham; after Graham departed for Kenya, Waugh enrolled for the autumn at a London art school, Heatherley's.

== Early career ==
=== Teaching and writing ===
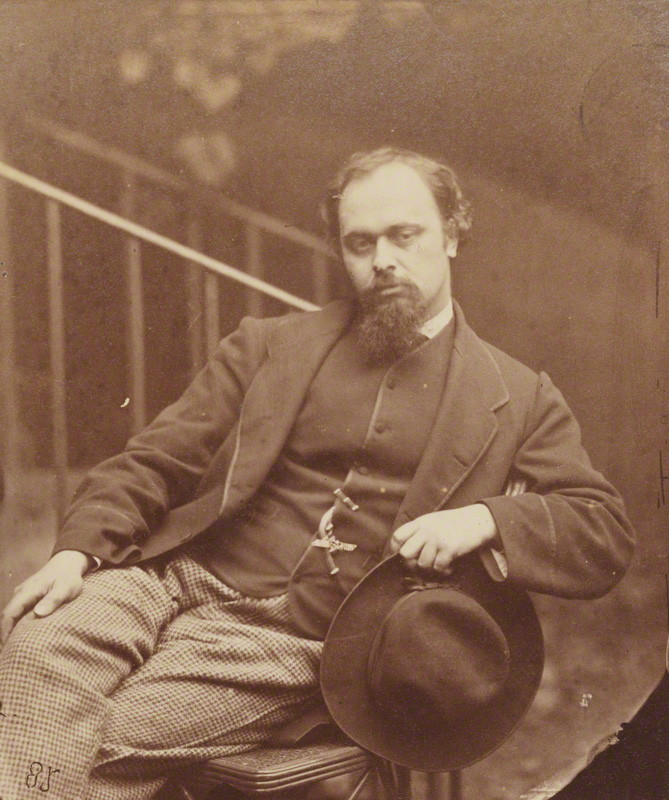
Dante Gabriel Rossetti, the subject of Waugh's first full-length book (1927)

Waugh began at Heatherley's in late September 1924, but became bored with the routine and quickly abandoned his course. He spent weeks partying in London and Oxford before the overriding need for money led him to apply through an agency for a teaching job. Almost at once, he secured a post at Arnold House, a boys' preparatory school in North Wales, beginning in January 1925, and staying at Plas Dulas nearby. He took with him the notes for his novel, The Temple at Thatch, intending to work on it in his spare time. Despite the gloomy ambience of the school, Waugh did his best to fulfil the requirements of his position, but a brief return to London and Oxford during the Easter holiday only exacerbated his sense of isolation.

In the summer of 1925, Waugh's outlook briefly improved, with the prospect of a job in Pisa, Italy, as secretary to the Scottish writer C. K. Scott Moncrieff, who was engaged on the English translations of Marcel Proust's works. Believing that the job was his, Waugh resigned his position at Arnold House. He had meantime sent the early chapters of his novel to Acton for assessment and criticism. Acton's reply was so coolly dismissive that Waugh immediately burnt his manuscript; shortly afterwards, before he left North Wales, he learned that the Moncrieff job had fallen through. The twin blows were sufficient for him to consider suicide. He records that he went down to a nearby beach and, leaving a note with his clothes, walked out to sea. A painful sting from a jellyfish apparently changed his mind, and he then returned quickly to the shore.

During the following two years Waugh taught at schools in Aston Clinton in Buckinghamshire (from which he was dismissed for the attempted drunken seduction of a school matron) and Notting Hill in London. He considered alternative careers in printing or cabinet-making, and attended evening classes in carpentry at Holborn Polytechnic while continuing to write. A short story, "The Balance", written in an experimental modernist style, became his first commercially published fiction, when it was included by Chapman and Hall in a 1926 anthology, Georgian Stories. An extended essay on the Pre-Raphaelite Brotherhood was printed privately by Alastair Graham, using by agreement the press of the Shakespeare Head Press in Stratford-upon-Avon, where he was undergoing training as a printer. This led to a contract from the publishers Duckworths for a full-length biography of Dante Gabriel Rossetti, which Waugh wrote during 1927. He also began working on a comic novel; after several temporary working titles this became Decline and Fall. Having given up teaching, he had no regular employment except for a short, unsuccessful stint as a reporter on the Daily Express in April–May 1927. That year he met (possibly through his brother Alec) and fell in love with Evelyn Gardner, the daughter of Lord and Lady Burghclere.

=== "He-Evelyn" and "She-Evelyn" ===
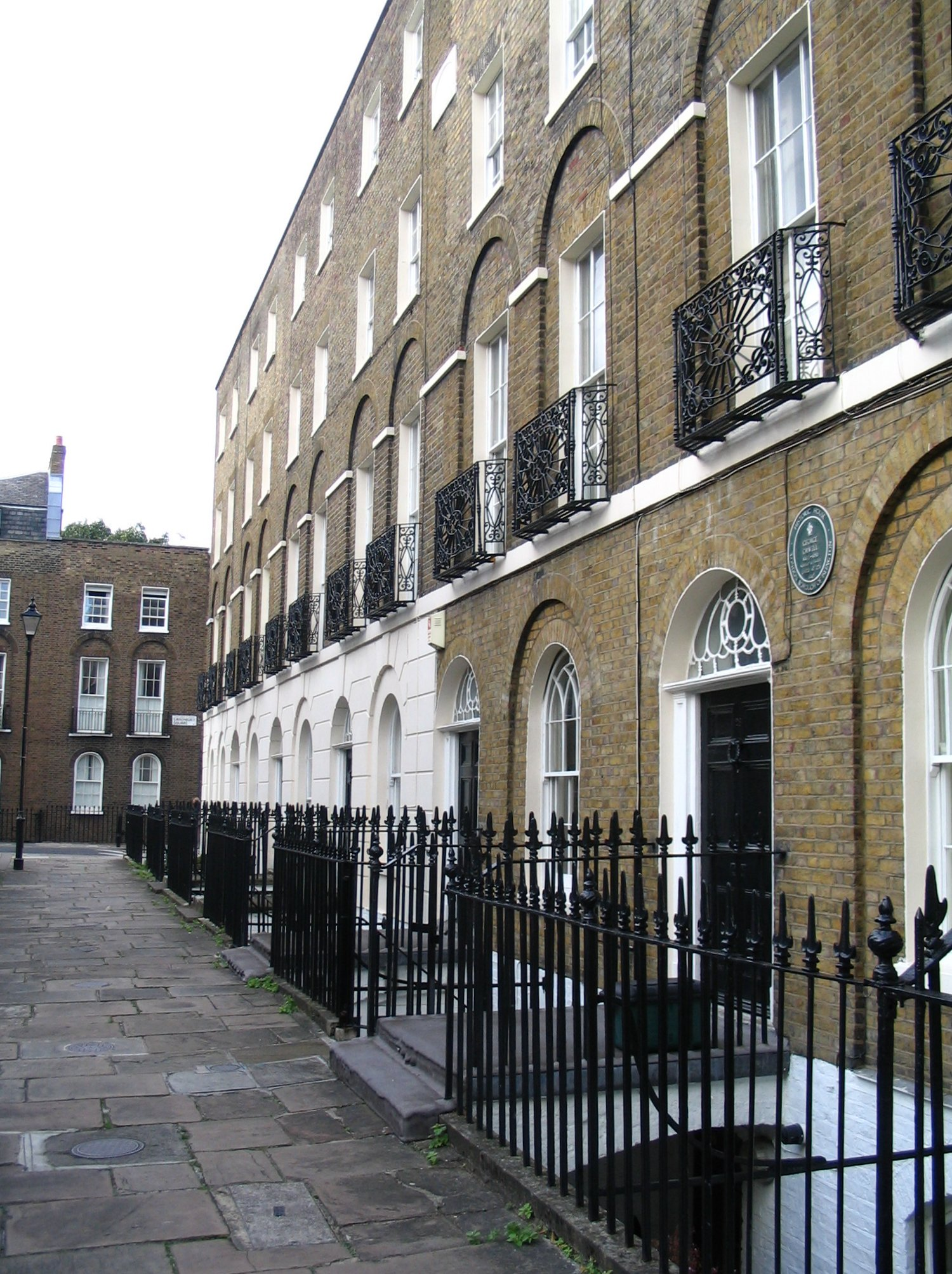
Canonbury Square, where Waugh and Evelyn Gardner lived during their brief marriage

In December 1927, Waugh and Evelyn Gardner became engaged, despite the opposition of Lady Burghclere, who felt that Waugh lacked moral fibre and kept unsuitable company. Among their friends, they quickly became known as "He-Evelyn" and "She-Evelyn". Waugh was at this time dependent on a £4-a-week allowance (equivalent to £217 in 2025) from his father and the small sums he could earn from book reviewing and journalism. The Rossetti biography was published to a generally favourable reception in April 1928: J. C. Squire in The Observer praised the book's elegance and wit; Acton gave cautious approval; and the novelist Rebecca West wrote to express how much she had enjoyed the book. Less pleasing to Waugh were the Times Literary Supplement's references to him as "Miss Waugh".

When Decline and Fall was completed, Duckworths objected to its "obscenity", but Chapman & Hall agreed to publish it. This was sufficient for Waugh and Gardner to bring forward their wedding plans. They were married in St Paul's Church, Portman Square, on 27 June 1928, with only Acton, Robert Byron, Alec Waugh and the bride's friend Pansy Pakenham present. The couple made their home in a small flat in Canonbury Square, Islington. The first months of the marriage were overshadowed by a lack of money, and by Gardner's poor health, which persisted into the autumn.

In September 1928, Decline and Fall was published to almost unanimous praise. By December, the book was into its third printing, and the American publishing rights were sold for $500. In the afterglow of his success, Waugh was commissioned to write travel articles in return for a free Mediterranean cruise, which he and Gardner began in February 1929, as an extended, delayed honeymoon. The trip was disrupted when Gardner contracted pneumonia and was carried ashore to the British hospital in Port Said. The couple returned home in June, after her recovery. A month later, without warning, Gardner confessed that their mutual friend, John Heygate, had become her lover. After an attempted reconciliation failed, a shocked and dismayed Waugh filed for divorce on 3 September 1929. The couple apparently met again only once, during the process for the annulment of their marriage a few years later.

== Novelist and journalist ==
=== Recognition ===
Waugh's first biographer, Christopher Sykes, records that after the divorce friends "saw, or believed they saw, a new hardness and bitterness" in Waugh's outlook. Nevertheless, despite a letter to Acton in which he wrote that he "did not know it was possible to be so miserable and live", he soon resumed his professional and social life. He finished his second novel, Vile Bodies, and wrote articles including (ironically, he thought) one for the Daily Mail on the meaning of the marriage ceremony. During this period Waugh began the practice of staying at the various houses of his friends; he was to have no settled home for the next eight years.

Vile Bodies, a satire on the Bright Young People of the 1920s, was published on 19 January 1930 and was Waugh's first major commercial success. Despite its quasi-biblical title, the book is dark, bitter, "a manifesto of disillusionment", according to biographer Martin Stannard. As a best-selling author Waugh could now command larger fees for his journalism. Amid regular work for The Graphic, Town and Country and Harper's Bazaar, he quickly wrote Labels, a detached account of his honeymoon cruise with She-Evelyn.

=== Conversion to Catholicism ===
On 29 September 1930, Waugh was received into the Catholic Church. This shocked his family and surprised some of his friends, but he had contemplated the step for some time. He had lost his Anglicanism at Lancing and had led an irreligious life at Oxford, but there are references in his diaries from the mid-1920s to religious discussion and regular churchgoing. On 22 December 1925, Waugh wrote: "Claud and I took Audrey to supper and sat up until 7 in the morning arguing about the Roman Church". The entry for 20 February 1927 includes, "I am to visit a Father Underhill about being a parson". Throughout the period, Waugh was influenced by his friend Olivia Plunket-Greene, who had converted in 1925 and of whom Waugh later wrote, "She bullied me into the Church". It was she who led him to Father Martin D'Arcy, a Jesuit, who persuaded Waugh "on firm intellectual convictions but little emotion" that "the Christian revelation was genuine". In 1949, Waugh explained that his conversion followed his realisation that life was "unintelligible and unendurable without God".

=== Writer and traveller ===
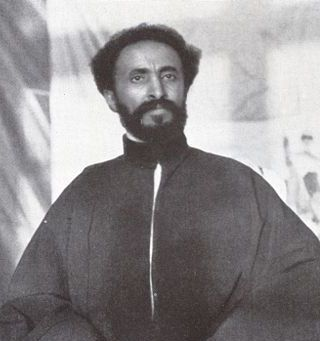
Emperor Haile Selassie, whose coronation Waugh attended in 1930 on the first of his three trips to Abyssinia

On 10 October 1930, Waugh, representing several newspapers, departed for Abyssinia to cover the coronation of Haile Selassie. He reported the event as "an elaborate propaganda effort" to convince the world that Abyssinia was a civilised nation which concealed the fact that the emperor had achieved power through barbarous means. A subsequent journey through the British East Africa colonies and the Belgian Congo formed the basis of two books; the travelogue Remote People (1931) and the comic novel Black Mischief (1932). Waugh's next extended trip, in the winter of 1932–1933, was to British Guiana (now Guyana) in South America, possibly taken to distract him from a long and unrequited passion for the socialite Teresa Jungman. On arrival in Georgetown, Waugh arranged a river trip by steam launch into the interior. He travelled on via several staging-posts to Boa Vista in Brazil, and then took a convoluted overland journey back to Georgetown. His various adventures and encounters found their way into two further books: his travel account Ninety-two Days, and the novel A Handful of Dust, both published in 1934.

Back from South America, Waugh faced accusations of obscenity and blasphemy from the Catholic journal The Tablet, which objected to passages in Black Mischief. He defended himself in an open letter to the Archbishop of Westminster, Cardinal Francis Bourne, which remained unpublished until 1980. In the summer of 1934, he went on an expedition to Spitsbergen in the Arctic, an experience he did not enjoy and of which he made minimal literary use. On his return, determined to write a major Catholic biography, he selected the Jesuit martyr Edmund Campion as his subject. The book, published in 1935, caused controversy by its forthright pro-Catholic, anti-Protestant stance but brought its writer the Hawthornden Prize. He returned to Abyssinia in August 1935 to report the opening stages of the Second Italo-Abyssinian War for the Daily Mail. Waugh, on the basis of his earlier visit, considered Abyssinia "a savage place which Mussolini was doing well to tame" according to his fellow reporter, William Deedes. Waugh saw little action and was not wholly serious in his role as a war correspondent. Deedes remarks on the older writer's snobbery: "None of us quite measured up to the company he liked to keep back at home". However, in the face of imminent Italian air attacks, Deedes found Waugh's courage "deeply reassuring". Waugh wrote up his Abyssinian experiences in a book, Waugh in Abyssinia (1936), which Rose Macaulay dismissed as a "fascist tract", on account of its pro-Italian tone. A better-known account is his novel Scoop (1938), in which the protagonist, William Boot, is loosely based on Deedes.

Among Waugh's growing circle of friends were Diana Guinness and Bryan Guinness (dedicatees of Vile Bodies), Lady Diana Cooper and her husband Duff Cooper, Nancy Mitford who was originally a friend of Evelyn Gardner's, and the Lygon sisters. Waugh had known Hugh Patrick Lygon at Oxford; now he was introduced to the girls and their country house, Madresfield Court, which became the closest that he had to a home during his years of wandering. In 1933, on a Greek islands cruise, he was introduced by Father D'Arcy to Gabriel Herbert, eldest daughter of the late explorer Aubrey Herbert. When the cruise ended Waugh was invited to stay at the Herbert family's villa in Portofino, where he first met Gabriel's 17-year-old sister, Laura.

=== Second marriage ===
On his conversion, Waugh had accepted that he would be unable to remarry while Evelyn Gardner was alive. However, he wanted a wife and children, and in October 1933, he began proceedings for the annulment of the marriage on the grounds of "lack of real consent". The case was heard by an ecclesiastical tribunal in London, but a delay in the submission of the papers to Rome meant that the annulment was not granted until 4 July 1936. In the meantime, following their initial encounter in Portofino, Waugh had fallen in love with Laura Herbert. He proposed marriage, by letter, in spring 1936. There were initial misgivings from the Herberts, an aristocratic Catholic family; as a further complication, Laura Herbert was a cousin of Evelyn Gardner. Despite some family hostility the marriage took place on 17 April 1937 at the Church of the Assumption in Warwick Street, London.

As a wedding present the bride's grandmother bought the couple Piers Court, a country house near Stinchcombe in Gloucestershire. The couple had seven children, one of whom died in infancy. Their first child, a daughter, Maria Teresa, was born on 9 March 1938 and a son, Auberon Alexander, on 17 November 1939. Between these events, Scoop was published in May 1938 to wide critical acclaim. In August 1938 Waugh, with Laura, made a three-month trip to Mexico after which he wrote Robbery Under Law, based on his experiences there. In the book he spelled out clearly his conservative credo; he later described the book as dealing "little with travel and much with political questions".

== Second World War ==
=== Royal Marine and commando ===
Waugh left Piers Court on 1 September 1939, at the outbreak of the Second World War and moved his young family to Pixton Park in Somerset, the Herbert family's country seat, while he sought military employment. He also began writing a novel in a new style, using first-person narration, but abandoned work on it when he was commissioned into the Royal Marines in December and entered training at Chatham naval base. He never completed the novel: fragments were eventually published as Work Suspended and Other Stories (1943).

Waugh's daily training routine left him with "so stiff a spine that he found it painful even to pick up a pen". In April 1940, he was temporarily promoted to captain and given command of a company of marines, but he proved an unpopular officer, being haughty and curt with his men. Even after the German invasion of the Low Countries (10 May – 22 June 1940), his battalion was not called into action. Waugh's inability to adapt to regimental life meant that he soon lost his command, and he became the battalion's Intelligence Officer. In that role, he finally saw action in Operation Menace as part of the British force sent to the Battle of Dakar in West Africa (23–25 September 1940) in August 1940 to support an attempt by the Free French Forces to overthrow the Vichy French colonial government and install General Charles de Gaulle. Operation Menace failed, hampered by fog and misinformation about the extent of the town's defences, and the British forces withdrew on 26 September. Waugh's comment on the affair was this: "Bloodshed has been avoided at the cost of honour."

In November 1940, Waugh was posted to a commando unit, and, after further training, became a member of "Layforce", under Colonel (later Brigadier) Robert Laycock. In February 1941, the unit sailed to the Mediterranean, where it participated in an unsuccessful attempt to recapture Bardia, on the Libyan coast. In May, Layforce was required to assist in the evacuation of Crete: Waugh was shocked by the disorder and its loss of discipline and, as he saw it, the cowardice of the departing troops. In July, during the roundabout journey home by troop ship, he wrote Put Out More Flags (1942), a novel of the war's early months in which he returned to the literary style he had used in the 1930s. Back in Britain, more training and waiting followed until, in May 1942, he was transferred to the Royal Horse Guards, on Laycock's recommendation. On 10 June 1942, Laura gave birth to Margaret, the couple's fourth child. (Note: Earlier, Laura had borne a daughter, christened Mary, on 1 December 1940, but she lived only a few hours.)

=== Frustration, Brideshead and Yugoslavia ===
Waugh's elation at his transfer soon descended into disillusion as he failed to find opportunities for active service. The death of his father, on 26 June 1943, and the need to deal with family affairs prevented him from departing with his brigade for North Africa as part of Operation Husky (9 July – 17 August 1943), the Allied invasion of Sicily. Despite his undoubted courage, his unmilitary and insubordinate character were rendering him effectively unemployable as a soldier. After spells of idleness at the regimental depot in Windsor, Waugh began parachute training at Tatton Park, Cheshire, but landed awkwardly during an exercise and fractured a fibula. Recovering at Windsor, he applied for three months' unpaid leave to write the novel that had been forming in his mind. His request was granted and, on 31 January 1944, he departed for Chagford, Devon, where he could work in seclusion. The result was Brideshead Revisited: The Sacred & Profane Memories of Captain Charles Ryder (1945), the first of his explicitly Catholic novels of which the biographer Douglas Lane Patey commented that it was "the book that seemed to confirm his new sense of his writerly vocation".

Waugh managed to extend his leave until June 1944. Soon after his return to duty he was recruited by Randolph Churchill to serve in the Maclean Mission to Yugoslavia, and, early in July, flew with Churchill from Bari, Italy, to the Croatian island of Vis. There, they met Marshal Tito, the Communist leader of the Partisans, who was leading the guerrilla fight against the occupying Axis forces with Allied support. Waugh and Churchill returned to Bari before flying back to Yugoslavia to begin their mission, but their aeroplane crash-landed, both men were injured, and their mission was delayed for a month.

The mission eventually arrived at Topusko, where it established itself in a deserted farmhouse. The group's liaison duties, between the British Army and the Communist Partisans, were light. Waugh had little sympathy with the Communist-led Partisans and despised Tito. His chief interest became the welfare of the Catholic Church in Croatia, which, he believed, had suffered at the hands of the Serbian Orthodox Church and would fare worse when the Communists took control. He expressed those thoughts in a long report, "Church and State in Liberated Croatia". After spells in Dubrovnik and Rome, Waugh returned to London on 15 March 1945 to present his report, which the Foreign Office suppressed to maintain good relations with Tito, now the leader of communist Yugoslavia.

== Postwar ==
=== Fame and fortune ===
Brideshead Revisited was published in London in May 1945. Waugh had been convinced of the book's qualities, "my first novel rather than my last". It was a tremendous success, bringing its author fame, fortune and literary status. Happy though he was with this outcome, Waugh's principal concern as the war ended was the fate of the large populations of Eastern European Catholics, betrayed (as he saw it) into the hands of Stalin's Soviet Union by the Allies. He now saw little difference in morality between the war's combatants and later described it as "a sweaty tug-of-war between teams of indistinguishable louts". Although he took momentary pleasure from the defeat of Winston Churchill and his Conservatives in the 1945 general election, he saw the accession to power of the Labour Party as a triumph of barbarism and the onset of a new "Dark Age".

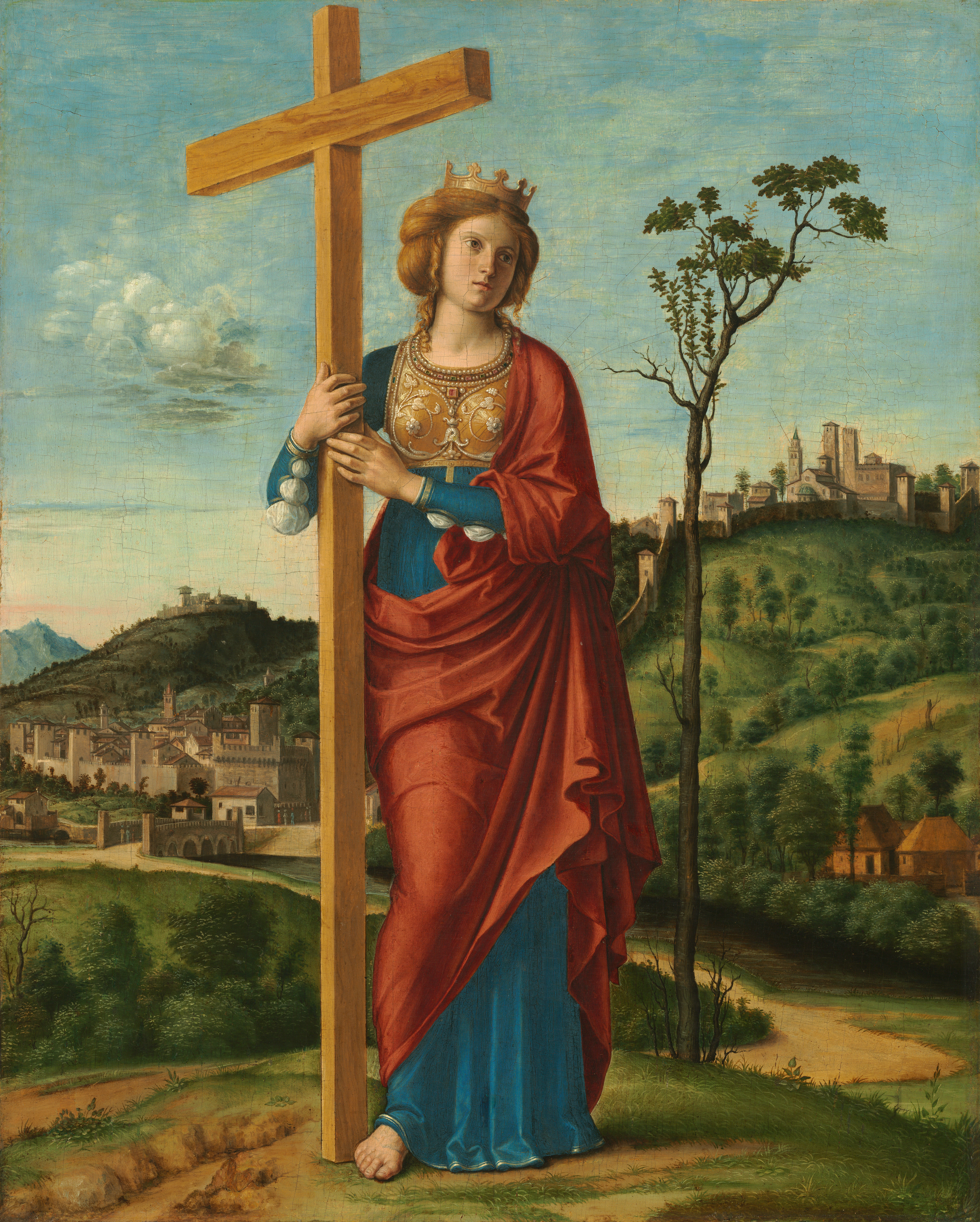
St. Helena, the subject of Waugh's 1950 novel

In September 1945, after he was released by the army, he returned to Piers Court with his family (another daughter, Harriet, had been born at Pixton in 1944) but spent much of the next seven years either in London, or travelling. In March 1946, he visited the Nuremberg trials, and later that year, he was in Spain for a celebration of the 400th anniversary of the death of Francisco de Vitoria, said to be the founder of international law. Waugh wrote up his experiences of the frustrations of postwar European travel in a novella, Scott-King's Modern Europe. In February 1947, he made the first of several trips to the United States, in the first instance to discuss filming of Brideshead. The project collapsed, but Waugh used his time in Hollywood to visit the Forest Lawn cemetery, which provided the basis for his satire of American perspectives on death, The Loved One (1948). In 1951 he visited the Holy Land with his future biographer, Christopher Sykes, and in 1953, he travelled to Goa to witness the final exhibition before burial of the remains of the 16th-century Jesuit missionary-priest Francis Xavier.

In between his journeys, Waugh worked intermittently on Helena, a long-planned novel about the discoverer of the True Cross that was by "far the best book I have ever written or ever will write". Its success with the public was limited, but it was, his daughter Harriet later said, "the only one of his books that he ever cared to read aloud".

In 1952 Waugh published Men at Arms, the first of his semi-autobiographical war trilogy in which he depicted many of his personal experiences and encounters from the early stages of the war. Other books published during this period included When The Going Was Good (1946), an anthology of his pre-war travel writing, The Holy Places (published by the Ian Fleming-managed Queen Anne Press, 1952) and Love Among the Ruins (1953), a dystopian tale in which Waugh displays his contempt for the modern world. Nearing 50, Waugh was old for his years, "selectively deaf, rheumatic, irascible" and increasingly dependent on alcohol and on drugs to relieve his insomnia and depression. Two more children, James (born 1946) and Septimus (born 1950), completed his family.

From 1945 onwards, Waugh became an avid collector, particularly of Victorian paintings and furniture. He filled Piers Court with his acquisitions, often from London's Portobello Market and from house clearance sales. His diary entry for 30 August 1946 records a visit to Gloucester, where he bought "a lion of wood, finely carved for £25, also a bookcase £35 ... a charming Chinese painting £10, a Regency easel £7". Some of his buying was shrewd and prescient; he paid £10 for Rossetti's "Spirit of the Rainbow" to begin a collection of Victorian paintings that eventually acquired great value. (Note: His collection of Victorian furniture, in particular works by William Burges, became similarly valuable. The pieces, some bought and some received as gifts, were considered almost worthless when Waugh acquired them, but later made large sums for his heirs. An example is the Zodiac settle, given to Waugh by John Betjeman and sold by Waugh's grandchildren in 2011 for £800,000.) Waugh also began, from 1949, to write knowledgeable reviews and articles on the subject of painting. (Note: See, for example, "Rossetti Revisited", 1949 (Gallagher (ed.)), pp. 377–379; "Age of Unrest", 1954 (Gallagher (ed.)), pp. 459–460; "The Death of Painting", 1956 (Gallagher (ed.)), pp. 503–507)

=== Breakdown ===
By 1953, Waugh's popularity as a writer was declining. He was perceived as out of step with the Zeitgeist, and the large fees he demanded were no longer easily available. His money was running out and progress on the second book of his war trilogy, Officers and Gentlemen, had stalled. Partly because of his dependency on drugs, his health was steadily deteriorating. Shortage of cash led him to agree in November 1953 to be interviewed on BBC radio, where the panel took an aggressive line: "they tried to make a fool of me, and I don't think they entirely succeeded", Waugh wrote to Nancy Mitford. Peter Fleming in The Spectator likened the interview to "the goading of a bull by matadors".

Early in 1954, Waugh's doctors, concerned by his physical deterioration, advised a change of scene. On 29 January, he took a ship bound for Ceylon, hoping that he would be able to finish his novel. Within a few days, he was writing home complaining of "other passengers whispering about me" and of hearing voices, including that of his recent BBC interlocutor, Stephen Black. He left the ship in Egypt and flew on to Colombo, but, he wrote to Laura, the voices followed him. Alarmed, Laura sought help from her friend, Frances Donaldson, whose husband agreed to fly out to Ceylon and bring Waugh home. In fact, Waugh made his own way back, now believing that he was suffering from demonic possession. A brief medical examination indicated that Waugh was suffering from bromide poisoning from his drugs regimen. When his medication was changed, the voices and the other hallucinations quickly disappeared. Waugh was delighted, informing all of his friends that he had been mad: "Clean off my onion!". The experience was fictionalised a few years later, in The Ordeal of Gilbert Pinfold (1957). (Note: Another piece of Burges furniture gifted by John Betjeman to Waugh, the Narcissus washstand, was central to his breakdown and later featured in the novel. Waugh become convinced that the carriers who transported the washstand to Piers Court had lost an important element of it, and engaged them in violent correspondence threatening legal action. He was unconvinced by Betjeman's assurance that the supposedly missing piece had never existed; "Oh no, old boy. There never was a pipe from the tap to the basin such as you envisaged".)

In 1956, Edwin Newman made a short film about Waugh. In the course of it, Newman learned that Waugh hated the modern world and wished that he had been born two or three centuries sooner. Waugh disliked modern methods of transportation or communication, refused to drive or use the telephone, and wrote with an old-fashioned dip pen. He also expressed the views that American news reporters could not function without frequent infusions of whisky, and that every American had been divorced at least once.

=== Late works ===
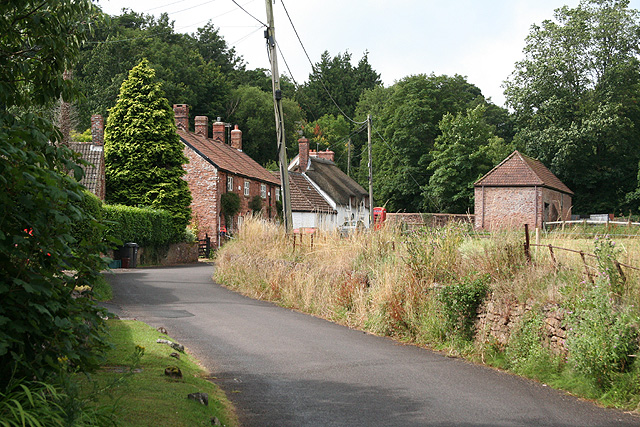
Combe Florey, the village in Somerset to which Waugh and his family moved in 1956

Restored to health, Waugh returned to work and finished Officers and Gentlemen. In June 1955 the popular novelist, Daily Express journalist and reviewer Nancy Spain, accompanied by her friend Lord Noel-Buxton, arrived uninvited at Piers Court and demanded an interview. Waugh saw the pair off and wrote a wry account for The Spectator, but he was troubled by the incident and decided to sell Piers Court: "I felt it was polluted", he told Nancy Mitford. Late in 1956, the family moved to Combe Florey House in the Somerset village of Combe Florey. In January 1957, Waugh avenged the Spain–Noel-Buxton intrusion by winning libel damages from the Express and Spain. The paper had printed an article by Spain that suggested that the sales of Waugh's books were much lower than they were and that his worth, as a journalist, was low.

Gilbert Pinfold was published in the summer of 1957, "my barmy book", Waugh called it. The extent to which the story is self-mockery, rather than true autobiography, became a subject of critical debate. Waugh's next major book was a biography of his longtime friend Ronald Knox, the Catholic writer and theologian who had died in August 1957. Research and writing extended over two years during which Waugh did little other work, delaying the third volume of his war trilogy. In June 1958, his son Auberon was severely wounded in a shooting accident while serving with the army in Cyprus. Waugh remained detached; he neither went to Cyprus nor immediately visited Auberon on the latter's return to Britain. The critic and literary biographer David Wykes called Waugh's sang-froid "astonishing" and the family's apparent acceptance of his behaviour even more so.

Although most of Waugh's books had sold well, and he had been well-rewarded for his journalism, his levels of expenditure meant that money problems and tax bills were a recurrent feature in his life. In 1950, as a means of tax avoidance, he had set up a trust fund for his children (he termed it the "Save the Children Fund", after the well-established charity of that name) into which he placed the initial advance and all future royalties from the Penguin (paperback) editions of his books. He was able to augment his personal finances by charging household items to the trust or selling his own possessions to it. Nonetheless, by 1960, shortage of money led him to agree to an interview on BBC Television, in the Face to Face series conducted by John Freeman. The interview was broadcast on 26 June 1960; according to his biographer Selina Hastings, Waugh restrained his instinctive hostility and coolly answered the questions put to him by Freeman, assuming what she describes as a "pose of world-weary boredom".

In 1960, Waugh was offered the honour of a CBE but declined, believing that he should have been given the superior status of a knighthood. In September, he produced his final travel book, A Tourist in Africa, based on a visit made in January–March 1959. He enjoyed the trip but "despised" the book. The critic Cyril Connolly called it "the thinnest piece of book-making that Mr Waugh has undertaken". The book done, he worked on the last of the war trilogy, which was published in 1961 as Unconditional Surrender.

=== Decline and death ===
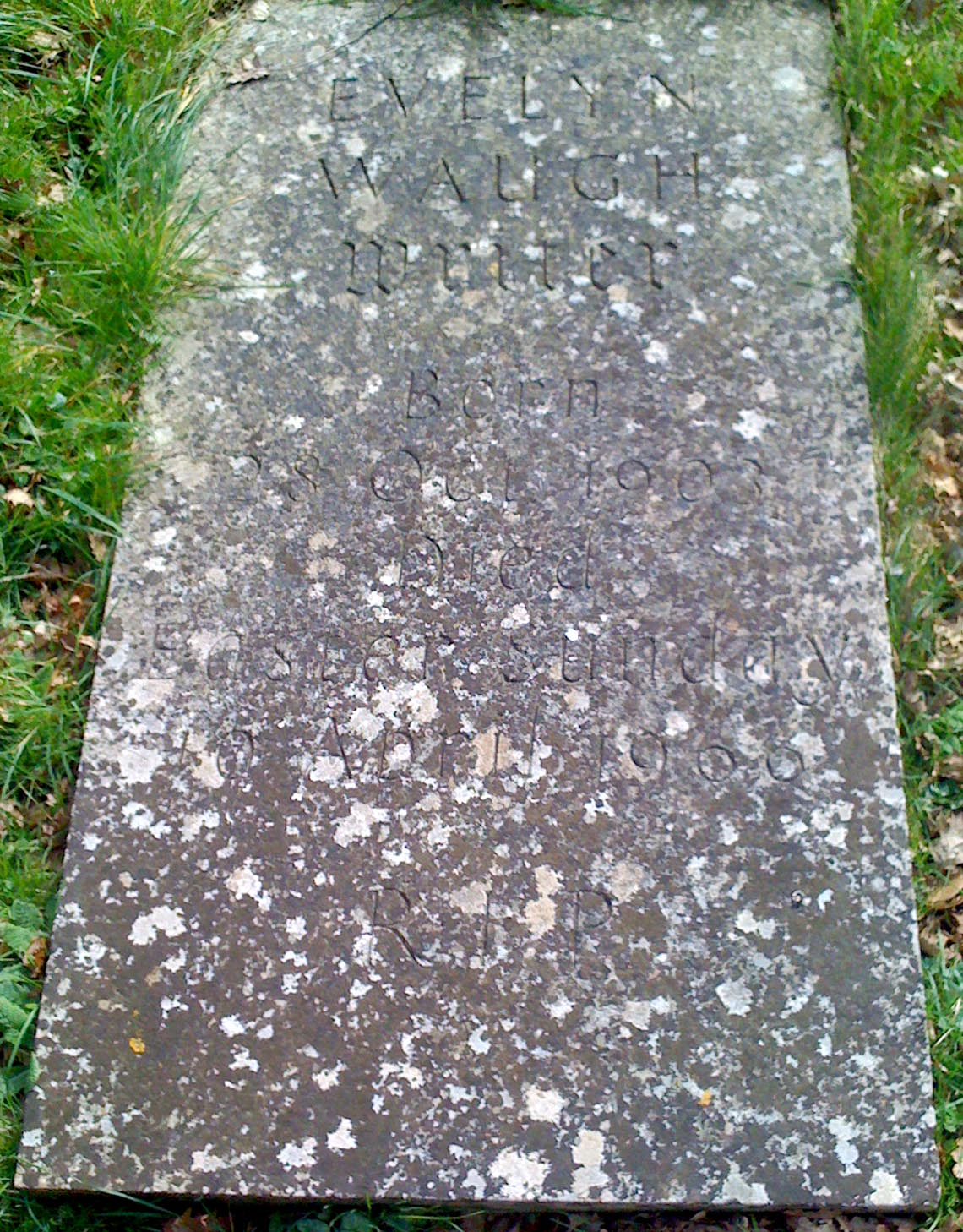
Waugh's grave in Combe Florey, adjacent to but not within the Anglican churchyard.

As he approached his sixties, Waugh was in poor health, prematurely aged, "fat, deaf, short of breath", according to Patey. His biographer Martin Stannard likened his appearance around this time to that of "an exhausted rogue jollied up by drink". In 1962 Waugh began work on his autobiography, and that same year wrote his final fiction, the long short story Basil Seal Rides Again. This revival of the protagonist of Black Mischief and Put Out More Flags was published in 1963; the Times Literary Supplement called it a "nasty little book". However, that same year, he was awarded with the title Companion of Literature by the Royal Society of Literature (its highest honour). When the first volume of autobiography, A Little Learning, was published in 1964, Waugh's often oblique tone and discreet name changes ensured that friends avoided the embarrassments that some had feared.

Waugh had welcomed the accession in 1958 of Pope John XXIII and wrote an appreciative tribute on the pope's death in 1963. However, he became increasingly concerned by the decisions emerging from the Second Vatican Council, which was convened by Pope John in October 1962 and continued under his successor, Pope Paul VI, until 1965. Waugh, a staunch opponent of Church reform, was particularly distressed by the replacement of the universal Latin Mass with the vernacular. In a Spectator article of 23 November 1962, he argued the case against change in a manner described by a later commentator as "sharp-edged reasonableness". He wrote to Nancy Mitford that "the buggering up of the Church is a deep sorrow to me .... We write letters to the paper. A fat lot of good that does."

In 1965, a new financial crisis arose from an apparent flaw in the terms of the "Save the Children" trust, and a large sum of back tax was being demanded. Waugh's agent, A. D. Peters, negotiated a settlement with the tax authorities for a manageable amount, but in his concern to generate funds, Waugh signed contracts to write several books, including a history of the papacy, an illustrated book on the Crusades and a second volume of autobiography. Waugh's physical and mental deterioration prevented any work on these projects, and the contracts were cancelled. He described himself as "toothless, deaf, melancholic, shaky on my pins, unable to eat, full of dope, quite idle" and expressed the belief that "all fates were worse than death". His only significant literary activity in 1965 was the editing of the three war novels into a single volume, published as Sword of Honour.

On Easter Day, 10 April 1966, after attending a Latin Mass in a neighbouring village with members of his family, Waugh died of heart failure at his Combe Florey home, aged 62. He was buried, by special arrangement, in a consecrated plot outside the Anglican churchyard of the Church of St Peter & St Paul, Combe Florey. A Requiem Mass, in Latin, was celebrated in Westminster Cathedral on 21 April 1966.

== Character and opinions ==
In the course of his lifetime, Waugh made enemies and offended many people; writer James Lees-Milne said that Waugh "was the nastiest-tempered man in England". Waugh's son, Auberon, said that the force of his father's personality was such that, despite his lack of height, "generals and chancellors of the exchequer, six-foot-six and exuding self-importance from every pore, quail[ed] in front of him".

In the biographic Mad World (2009), Paula Byrne said that the common view of Evelyn Waugh as a "snobbish misanthrope" is a caricature; she asks: "Why would a man, who was so unpleasant, be so beloved by such a wide circle of friends?" His generosity to individual persons and causes, especially Catholic causes, extended to small gestures; after his libel-court victory over Nancy Spain, he sent her a bottle of champagne. Hastings said that Waugh's outward personal belligerence to strangers was not entirely serious but an attempt at "finding a sparring partner worthy of his own wit and ingenuity". Besides mocking others, Waugh mocked himself—the elderly buffer, "crusty colonel" image, which he presented in later life, was a comic impersonation, and not his true self.

As an instinctive conservative, Waugh believed that class divisions, with inequalities of wealth and position, were natural and that "no form of government [was] ordained by God as being better than any other". In the post-war "Age of the Common Man", he attacked socialism (the "Cripps–Attlee terror") and complained, after Churchill's election in 1951, that "the Conservative Party have never put the clock back a single second". Waugh never voted in elections; in 1959, he expressed a hope that the Conservatives would win that year's election, which they did, but would not vote for them, saying "I should feel I was morally inculpated in their follies" and added: "I do not aspire to advise my sovereign in her choice of servants".

Waugh's Catholicism was fundamental: "The Church ... is the normal state of man from which men have disastrously exiled themselves." He believed that the Catholic Church was the last, great defence against the encroachment of the Dark Age being ushered in by the welfare state and the spreading of working-class culture. Strictly observant, Waugh admitted to Diana Cooper that his most difficult task was how to square the obligations of his faith with his indifference to his fellow men. When Nancy Mitford asked him how he reconciled his often objectionable conduct with being a Christian, Waugh replied that "were he not a Christian he would be even more horrible".

Waugh's conservatism was aesthetic as well as political and religious. Although he praised younger writers, such as Angus Wilson, Muriel Spark and V. S. Naipaul, he was scornful of the 1950s writers' group known as "The Movement". He said that the literary world was "sinking into black disaster" and that literature might die within thirty years. As a schoolboy Waugh had praised Cubism, but he soon abandoned his interest in artistic modernism. In 1945, Waugh said that Pablo Picasso's artistic standing was the result of a "mesmeric trick" and that his paintings "could not be intelligently discussed in the terms used of the civilised masters". In 1953, in a radio interview, he named Augustus Egg (1816–1863) as a painter for whom he had particular esteem. (Note: Excerpts from the text of the broadcast, on 16 November 1953, are given in the 1998 Penguin Books edition of The Ordeal of Gilbert Pinfold, pp. 135–143) Despite their political differences, Waugh came to admire George Orwell, because of their shared patriotism and sense of morality. Orwell in turn commented that Waugh was "about as good a novelist as one can be ... while holding untenable opinions".

Waugh has been criticised for expressing racial and anti-semitic prejudices. Wykes describes Waugh's anti-semitism as "his most persistently noticeable nastiness", and his assumptions of white superiority as "an illogical extension of his views on the naturalness and rightness of hierarchy as the principle of social organization".

== Works ==
=== Themes and style ===
Wykes observes that Waugh's novels reprise and fictionalise the principal events of his life, although in an early essay Waugh wrote: "Nothing is more insulting to a novelist than to assume that he is incapable of anything but the mere transcription of what he observes". The reader should not assume that the author agreed with the opinions expressed by his fictional characters. Nevertheless, in the Introduction to the Complete Short Stories, Ann Pasternak Slater said that the "delineation of social prejudices and the language in which they are expressed is part of Waugh's meticulous observation of his contemporary world".

The critic Clive James said of Waugh: "Nobody ever wrote a more unaffectedly elegant English ... its hundreds of years of steady development culminate in him". As his talent developed and matured, he maintained what literary critic Andrew Michael Roberts called "an exquisite sense of the ludicrous, and a fine aptitude for exposing false attitudes". In the first stages of his 40-year writing career, before his conversion to Catholicism in 1930, Waugh was the novelist of the Bright Young People generation. His first two novels, Decline and Fall (1928) and Vile Bodies (1930), comically reflect a futile society, populated by two-dimensional, basically unbelievable characters in circumstances too fantastic to evoke the reader's emotions. A typical Waugh trademark evident in the early novels is rapid, unattributed dialogue in which the participants can be readily identified. At the same time Waugh was writing serious essays, such as "The War and the Younger Generation", in which he castigates his own generation as "crazy and sterile" people.

Waugh's conversion to Catholicism did not noticeably change the nature of his next two novels, Black Mischief (1934) and A Handful of Dust (1934), but, in the latter novel, the elements of farce are subdued, and the protagonist, Tony Last, is recognisably a person rather than a comic cipher. Waugh's first fiction with a Catholic theme was the short story "Out of Depth" (1933) about the immutability of the Mass. From the mid-1930s onwards, Catholicism and conservative politics were much featured in his journalistic and non-fiction writing before he reverted to his former manner with Scoop (1938), a novel about journalism, journalists, and unsavoury journalistic practices.

In Work Suspended and Other Stories Waugh introduced "real" characters and a first-person narrator, signalling the literary style he would adopt in Brideshead Revisited a few years later. Brideshead, which questions the meaning of human existence without God, is the first novel in which Evelyn Waugh clearly presents his conservative religious and political views. In the Life magazine article "Fan Fare" (1946), Waugh said that "you can only leave God out [of fiction] by making your characters pure abstractions" and that his future novels shall be "the attempt to represent man more fully which, to me, means only one thing, man in his relation to God." As such, the novel Helena (1950) is Evelyn Waugh's most philosophically Christian book.

In Brideshead, the proletarian junior officer Hooper illustrates a theme that persists in Waugh's postwar fiction: the rise of mediocrity in the "Age of the Common Man". In the trilogy Sword of Honour (Men at Arms, 1952; Officers and Gentlemen, 1955, Unconditional Surrender, 1961) the social pervasiveness of mediocrity is personified in the semi-comical character "Trimmer", a sloven and a fraud who triumphs by contrivance. In the novella Scott-King's Modern Europe (1947), Waugh's pessimism about the future is in the schoolmaster's admonition: "I think it would be very wicked indeed to do anything to fit a boy for the modern world". Likewise, such cynicism pervades the novel Love Among the Ruins (1953), set in a dystopian, welfare-state Britain that is so socially disagreeable that euthanasia is the most sought-after of the government's social services. Of the postwar novels, Patey says that The Ordeal of Gilbert Pinfold (1957) stands out "a kind of mock-novel, a sly invitation to a game". Waugh's final work of fiction, "Basil Seal Rides Again" (1962), features characters from the prewar novels; Waugh admitted that the work was a "senile attempt to recapture the manner of my youth". Stylistically this final story begins in the same fashion as the first story, "The Balance" of 1926, with a "fusillade of unattributed dialogue".

=== Reception ===
Of Waugh's early books, Decline and Fall was hailed by Arnold Bennett in the Evening Standard as "an uncompromising and brilliantly malicious satire". The critical reception of Vile Bodies two years later was even more enthusiastic, with Rebecca West predicting that Waugh was "destined to be the dazzling figure of his age". However, A Handful of Dust, later widely regarded as a masterpiece, received a more muted welcome from critics, despite the author's own high estimation of the work. Chapter VI, "Du Côté de Chez Todd", of A Handful of Dust, with Tony Last condemned forever to read Dickens to his mad jungle captor, was thought by the critic Henry Yorke to reduce an otherwise believable book to "phantasy". The critic Cyril Connolly's first reaction to the book was that Waugh's powers were failing, an opinion that he later revised.

In the later 1930s, Waugh's inclination to Catholic and conservative polemics affected his standing with the general reading public. The Campion biography is said by David Wykes to be "so rigidly biased that it has no claims to make as history". The pro-fascist tone in parts of Waugh in Abyssinia offended readers and critics and prevented its publication in America. There was general relief among critics when Scoop, in 1938, indicated a return to Waugh's earlier comic style. Critics had begun to think that his wit had been displaced by partisanship and propaganda.

Waugh maintained his reputation in 1942, with Put Out More Flags, which sold well despite wartime restrictions on paper and printing. Its public reception, however, did not compare with that accorded to Brideshead Revisited three years later, on both sides of the Atlantic. Brideshead's selection as the American Book of the Month swelled its US sales to an extent that dwarfed those in Britain, which was affected by paper shortages. Despite the public's enthusiasm, critical opinion was split. Brideshead's Catholic standpoint offended some critics who had greeted Waugh's earlier novels with warm praise. Its perceived snobbery and its deference to the aristocracy were attacked by, among others, Conor Cruise O'Brien who, in the Irish literary magazine The Bell, wrote of Waugh's "almost mystical veneration" for the upper classes. Fellow writer Rose Macaulay believed that Waugh's genius had been adversely affected by the intrusion of his right-wing partisan alter ego and that he had lost his detachment: "In art so naturally ironic and detached as his, this is a serious loss". Conversely, the book was praised by Yorke, Graham Greene and, in glowing terms, by Harold Acton who was particularly impressed by its evocation of 1920s Oxford. In 1959, at the request of publishers Chapman and Hall and in some deference to his critics, Waugh revised the book and wrote in a preface: "I have modified the grosser passages but not obliterated them because they are an essential part of the book".

In "Fan Fare", Waugh forecasts that his future books will be unpopular because of their religious theme. On publication in 1950, Helena was received indifferently by the public and by critics, who disparaged the awkward mixing of 20th-century schoolgirl slang with otherwise reverential prose. Otherwise, Waugh's prediction proved unfounded; all his fiction remained in print and sales stayed healthy. During his successful 1957 lawsuit against the Daily Express, Waugh's counsel produced figures showing total sales to that time of over four million books, two thirds in Britain and the rest in America. Men at Arms, the first volume of his war trilogy, won the James Tait Black Memorial Prize in 1953; initial critical comment was lukewarm, with Connolly likening Men at Arms to beer rather than champagne. Connolly changed his view later, calling the completed trilogy "the finest novel to come out of the war". Of Waugh's other major postwar works, the Knox biography was admired within Waugh's close circle but criticised by others in the Church for its depiction of Knox as an unappreciated victim of the Catholic hierarchy. The book did not sell well—"like warm cakes", according to Waugh. Pinfold surprised the critics by its originality. Its plainly autobiographical content, Hastings suggests, gave the public a fixed image of Waugh: "stout, splenetic, red-faced and reactionary, a figure from burlesque complete with cigar, bowler hat and loud checked suit".

=== Reputation ===
In 1973, Waugh's diaries were serialised in The Observer prior to publication in book form in 1976. The revelations about his private life, thoughts and attitudes created controversy. Although Waugh had removed embarrassing entries relating to his Oxford years and his first marriage, there was sufficient left on the record to enable enemies to project a negative image of the writer as intolerant, snobbish and sadistic, with pronounced fascist leanings. Some of this picture, it was maintained by Waugh's supporters, arose from poor editing of the diaries, and a desire to transform Waugh from a writer to a "character". Nevertheless, a popular conception developed of Waugh as a monster. When, in 1980, a selection of his letters was published, his reputation became the subject of further discussion. Philip Larkin, reviewing the collection in The Guardian, thought that it demonstrated Waugh's elitism; to receive a letter from him, it seemed, "one would have to have a nursery nickname and be a member of White's, a Roman Catholic, a high-born lady or an Old Etonian novelist".

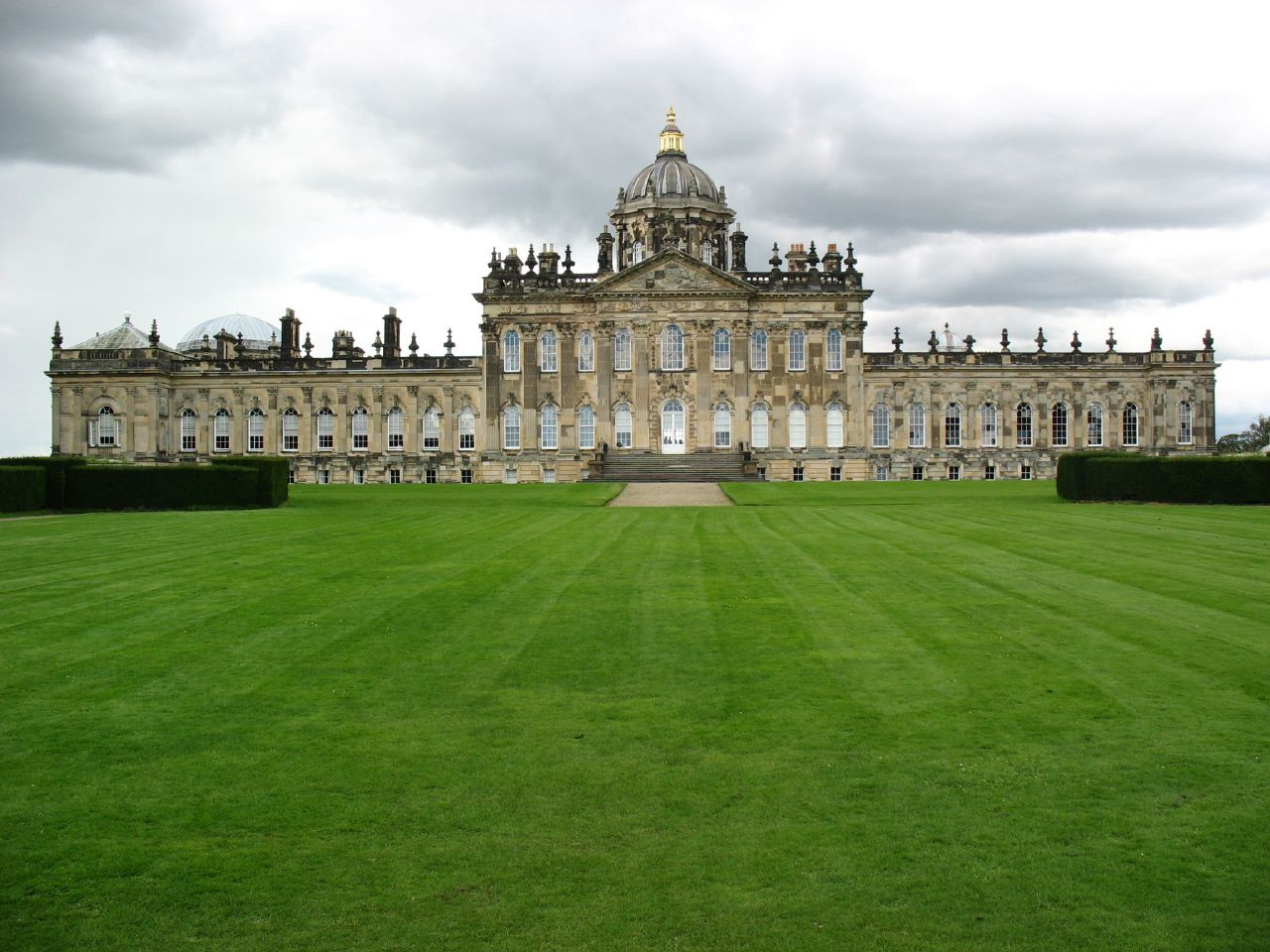
Castle Howard, in Yorkshire, was used to represent "Brideshead" in the 1981 television series and in a subsequent 2008 film.

The publication of the diaries and letters promoted increased interest in Waugh and his works and caused publication of much new material. Christopher Sykes's biography had appeared in 1975, between 1980 and 1998 three more full biographies were issued and other biographical and critical studies have continued to be produced. A collection of Waugh's journalism and reviews was published in 1983, revealing a fuller range of his ideas and beliefs. The new material provided further grounds for debate between Waugh's supporters and detractors.

The 1981 Granada Television adaptation of Brideshead Revisited introduced a new generation to Waugh's works, in Britain and in America. There had been earlier television treatment of Waugh's fiction, as Sword of Honour had been serialised by the BBC in 1967, but the impact of Granada's Brideshead was much wider. Its nostalgic depiction of a vanished form of Englishness appealed to the American mass market; Time magazine's TV critic described the series as "a novel ... made into a poem", and listed it among the "100 Best TV Shows of All Time". There have been further cinematic Waugh adaptations: A Handful of Dust in 1988, Vile Bodies (filmed as Bright Young Things) in 2003 and Brideshead Revisited again in 2008. These popular treatments have maintained the public's appetite for Waugh's novels, all of which remain in print and continue to sell. Several have been listed among various compiled lists of the world's greatest novels. (Note: See Time's List of the 100 Best Novels; The Observer critics' "100 greatest novels of all time"; Random House Modern Library's "100 Best Novels".)

Stannard concludes that beneath his public mask, Waugh was "a dedicated artist and a man of earnest faith, struggling against the dryness of his soul". Graham Greene, in a letter to The Times shortly after Waugh's death, acknowledged him as "the greatest novelist of my generation", while Time magazine's obituarist called him "the grand old mandarin of modern British prose" and asserted that his novels "will continue to survive as long as there are readers who can savor what critic V. S. Pritchett calls 'the beauty of his malice' ". Nancy Mitford said of him in a television interview, "What nobody remembers about Evelyn is that everything with him was jokes. Everything. That's what none of the people who wrote about him seem to have taken into account at all".

== Sources ==
- Amory, Mark, ed. (1995). The Letters of Evelyn Waugh. London: Phoenix. ISBN 1-85799-245-8. (Originally published by Weidenfeld and Nicolson, London 1980)
- Green, Candida Lycett, ed. (1995). John Betjeman - Letters: 1951 to 1984. Vol. 2. London: Methuen. ISBN 0-413-66940-8.
- Byrne, Paula (2010). Mad World: Evelyn Waugh and the Secrets of Brideshead. London: Harper Press. ISBN 978-0-00-724377-8.
- Carpenter, Humphrey (1989). The Brideshead Generation: Evelyn Waugh and his Friends. London: Weidenfeld and Nicolson. ISBN 0-297-79320-9.
- Cooper, Artemis, ed. (1991). Mr Wu and Mrs Stitch: The Letters of Evelyn Waugh and Diana Cooper. London: Hodder & Stoughton. ISBN 0-340-53488-5.
- Davie, Michael, ed. (1976). The Diaries of Evelyn Waugh. London: Weidenfeld and Nicolson. ISBN 0-297-77126-4.
- Deedes, William (2003). At War with Waugh. London: Macmillan. ISBN 1-4050-0573-4.
- Donaldson, Frances (1967). Evelyn Waugh: Portrait of a Country Neighbour. London: Weidenfeld and Nicolson. ISBN 0-297-78776-4.
- Eade, Philip (2016). Evelyn Waugh: A Life Revisited. New York: Henry Holt. ISBN 978-0-805-09760-3.
- Gallagher, Donat, ed. (1983). The Essays, Articles and Reviews of Evelyn Waugh. London: Methuen. ISBN 0-413-50370-4.
- Hastings, Selina (1994). Evelyn Waugh: A Biography. London: Sinclair-Stevenson. ISBN 1-85619-223-7.
- Hollis, Christopher (1971). Evelyn Waugh. Longmans. ISBN 0-582-01046-2.
- James, Clive (2007). Cultural Amnesia. London: Picador. ISBN 978-0-330-41886-7.
- Lebedoff, David (2008). The Same Man: George Orwell & Evelyn Waugh. New York: Random House. ISBN 978-1-4000-6634-6.
- Lees-Milne, James (1985). Ancestral Voices. London: Faber & Faber. ISBN 0-571-13325-8. (Originally published by Chatto & Windus, London 1976)
- Patey, Douglas Lane (1998). The Life of Evelyn Waugh. Oxford, UK: Blackwell. ISBN 0-631-18933-5.
- Slater, Ann Pasternak, ed. (1998). Evelyn Waugh: The Complete Short Stories (Introduction). London: Everyman's. ISBN 1-85715-190-9.
- Stannard, Martin (1993). Evelyn Waugh, Volume I: The Early Years 1903–1939. London: Flamingo. ISBN 0-586-08678-1.
- Stannard, Martin (1993). Evelyn Waugh, Volume II: No Abiding City 1939–1966. London: Flamingo. ISBN 0-586-08680-3.
- Stannard, Martin (1984). Evelyn Waugh: The Critical Heritage. London: Routledge. ISBN 0-415-15924-5.
- Stopp, Frederick J. (1958). Evelyn Waugh: Portrait of an Artist. London: Chapman & Hall.
- Sykes, Christopher (1975). Evelyn Waugh: A Biography. London: Collins. ISBN 0-00-211202-7.
- Waugh, Auberon (1991). Will This Do?. London: Century. ISBN 0-7126-3733-8.
- Waugh, Evelyn (1983). A Little Learning. Harmondsworth, UK: Penguin Books. ISBN 0-14-006604-7. (Originally published by Chapman and Hall, 1964)
- Wykes, David (1999). Evelyn Waugh: A Literary Life. London: Macmillan. ISBN 0-333-61138-1.
