= The Ordeal of Gilbert Pinfold =

1957 autobiographical novel by Evelyn Waugh

- First edition (1957)
- Author: Evelyn Waugh
- Language: English
- Genre: Novel
- Publisher: Chapman & Hall
- Publication date: 19 July 1957
- Publication place: United Kingdom

The Ordeal of Gilbert Pinfold is a novel by the British writer Evelyn Waugh, first published in July 1957. It is Waugh's penultimate full-length work of fiction, which the author called his "mad book"—a largely autobiographical account of a period of hallucinations caused by bromide intoxication that he experienced in the early months of 1954, recounted through his protagonist Gilbert Pinfold.

Waugh's health in the winter of 1953–54 was indifferent, and he was beset with various personal anxieties that were stifling his ability to work. He was also consuming alcohol, bromide and chloral in large amounts. In search of a peaceful environment in which he could resume writing, he embarked on a sea voyage to Ceylon, but was driven to the point of madness by imagined voices that assailed him throughout the voyage. These experiences are mirrored in the novel by those of Pinfold, a successful writer in the Waugh mould who, as an antidote to his lassitude and chronic insomnia, is dosing himself with a similar regimen of drugs. This cocktail brings about a series of hallucinatory episodes during a sea voyage taken by Pinfold for the sake of his health; he hears voices that insult, taunt and threaten him. He leaves the ship, but his unseen tormentors follow him. On his return to England, his wife convinces him that the voices were imaginary, and his doctor diagnoses poisoning from the bromide and chloral mixture. Pinfold, however, also views the episode as a private victory over the forces of evil.

On the book's publication, Waugh's friends praised it, but its general critical reception was muted. Most reviewers admired the self-portrait of Waugh with which the novel opens, but expressed divided views about the rest, in particular the ending. Commentators have debated whether the novel provides a real-life depiction of Waugh, or if it represents the exaggerated persona that he cultivated as a means of preserving his privacy. The book has been dramatised for radio and as a stage play.

== Plot ==
Gilbert Pinfold is an English novelist of repute who at the age of 50 can look back on a varied life that has included a dozen reasonably successful books, wide travel, and honourable service in the Second World War. He lives quietly, on good but not close terms with his neighbours; his Roman Catholicism sets him slightly apart in the local community. He has a pronounced distaste for most aspects of modern life, and has of late become somewhat lazy, given to drinking more than he should. To counter the effects of his several aches and pains, Pinfold has taken to dosing himself with a powerful sedative of chloral and bromide. He conceals this practice from his doctor.

Pinfold is very protective of his privacy, but uncharacteristically agrees to be interviewed on BBC radio. The main inquisitor is a man named Angel, whose voice and manner disconcert Pinfold, who believes he detects a veiled malicious intent. In the weeks that follow, Pinfold broods on the incident. He finds his memory beginning to play tricks on him. The encroaching winter depresses him further; he decides to escape by taking a cruise, and secures passage on the SS Caliban, bound for Ceylon. As the voyage proceeds, Pinfold finds that he hears sounds and conversations from other parts of the ship which he believes are somehow being transmitted into his cabin. Amid an increasingly bizarre series of overheard incidents, he hears remarks which become progressively more insulting, and then directly threatening towards himself. The main tormentors are a man and a woman, whose vicious words are balanced by those of an affectionate younger woman, Margaret. He is convinced that the man is the BBC interviewer Angel, using his technical knowledge to broadcast the voices. Pinfold spends sleepless nights, awaiting a threatened beating, a kidnapping attempt and a seductive visit from Margaret.

To escape his persecutors Pinfold disembarks at Alexandria and flies on to Colombo, but the voices pursue him. Pinfold has now reconciled himself to their presence and is able to ignore them, or even converse rationally with them. After a brief stay in Colombo he returns to England. On the flight home he is told by "Angel" that the whole episode was a scientific experiment that got out of hand; if Pinfold will keep silent about his experiences, he is told, he will never be bothered by the voices again. Pinfold refuses, declaring Angel to be a menace that must be exposed. Back in England, Mrs Pinfold convinces him that Angel had never left the country and the voices are imaginary. Pinfold hears Margaret faintly say,"I don't exist, but I do love you", before the voices disappear forever. Pinfold's doctor diagnoses poisoning from the bromide and chloral. Pinfold views his courage in the battle against the voices as a significant victory in the battle with his personal demons, and he begins to write an account of his experiences: "The Ordeal of Gilbert Pinfold".

== Background ==
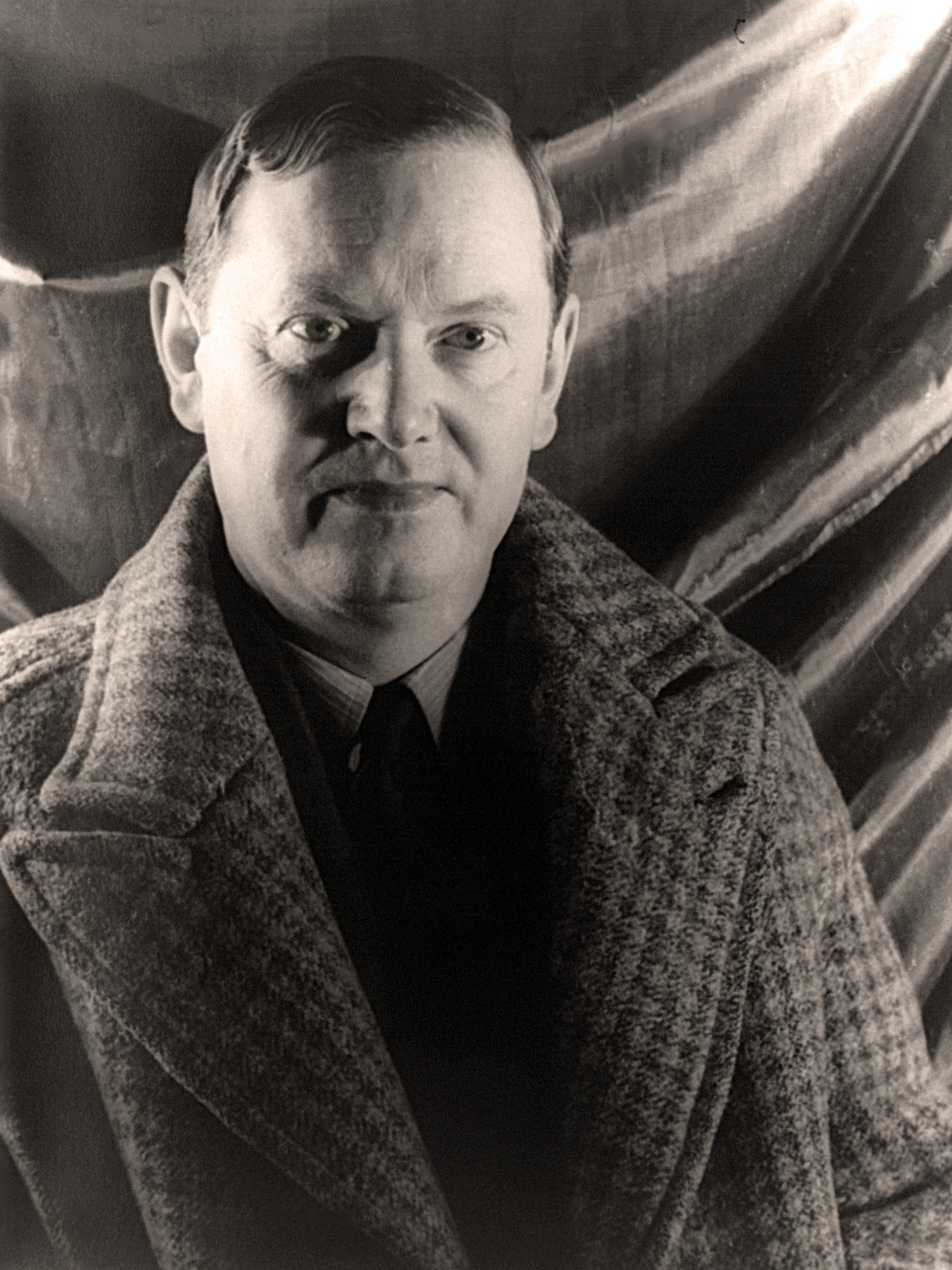
Evelyn Waugh (photographed in about 1940)

Evelyn Waugh's professional and private circumstances, in the years after the Second World War, prefigured those of his fictional counterpart Pinfold. Before the war he had established himself as a writer, mainly of light satirical fiction. His wartime experiences, including service in the Royal Marines and the Royal Horse Guards, changed his personal and literary outlook, and put him into what his biographer David Wykes describes as "a mood of introspection ... that endured to the end of his career". Despite occasional reversions to his former style, in general Waugh's post-war fiction aspired to a more serious purpose. In an essay published in Life magazine in April 1946, he wrote: "In my future books there will be two things to make them unpopular: a preoccupation with style and the attempt to represent man more fully, which, to me, means only one thing, man in his relation to God." The commercial success of Brideshead Revisited, published in 1945, provided Waugh with the financial means to pursue his writing career in a leisurely fashion. He worked intermittently on his novel Helena for five years, while completing shorter projects and carrying out much unpaid work, particularly for Catholic organisations. In a marked change from his pre-war life, he ceased to socialise and became increasingly concerned to protect his privacy. To this end he adopted an overtly hostile persona as a defence mechanism, to repel the outside world.

By the early 1950s Waugh was troubled on a number of fronts. He was afflicted with writer's block, and was unable to make progress with his current novel, the second in his Sword of Honour trilogy. (Note: The book's working title was Happy Warriors; by October 1953 Waugh had completed 25,000 words, but then came to a full stop. The novel was eventually retitled Officers and Gentlemen. Waugh completed it in November 1954, and it was published in the following summer.) He had financial worries, a legacy of his free-spending post-war habits combined with accumulated tax liabilities and a lack of remunerative productivity. His general health was poor; he suffered from toothache, sciatica and rheumatism, and his memory was faulty. He was also drinking heavily, the effects of which were aggravated by a large intake of chloral and bromide washed down with crème de menthe—a treatment for insomnia that he concealed from his doctors.

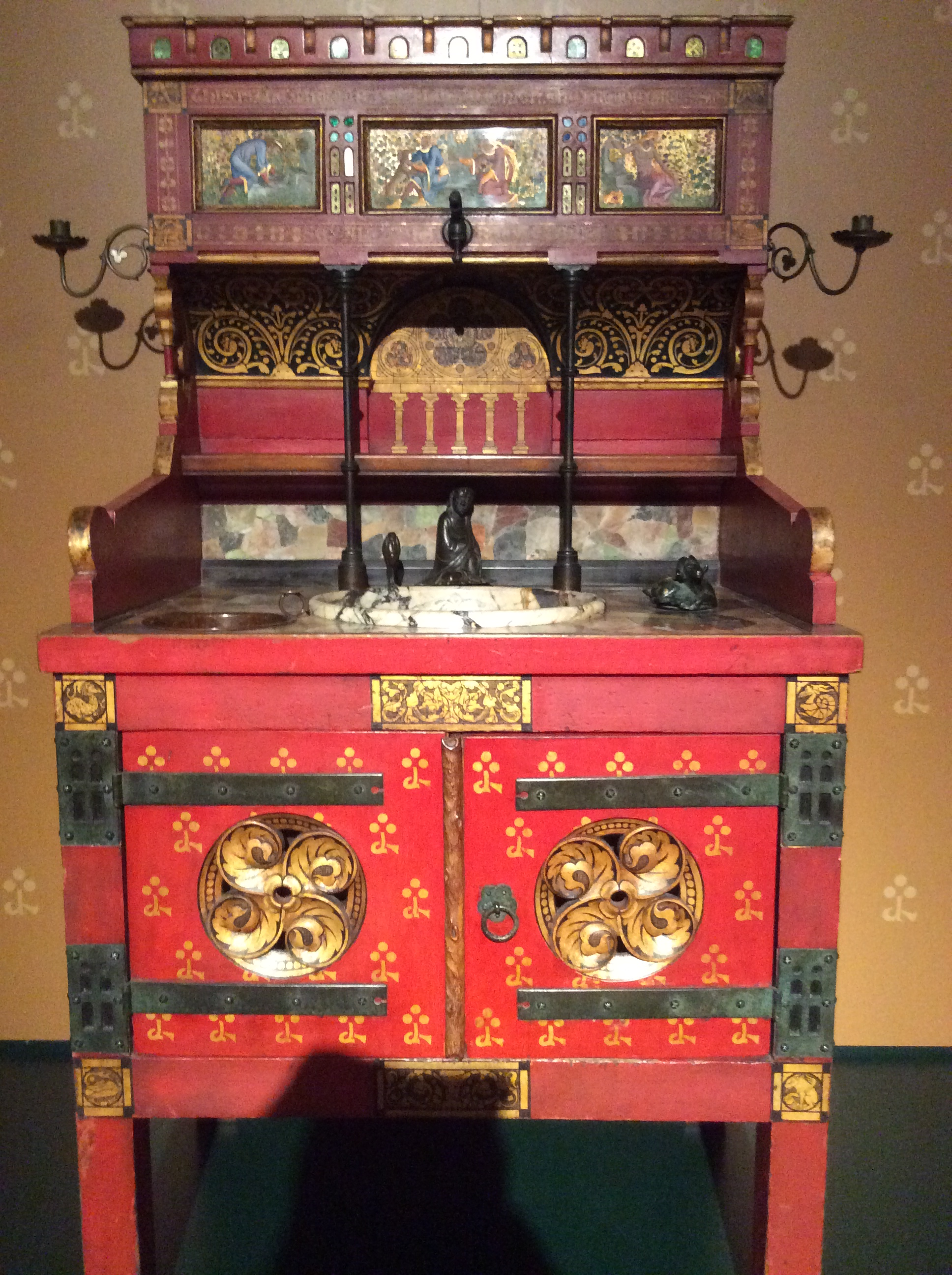
William Burges's Narcissus washstand, now in The Higgins Art Gallery & Museum

A shortage of cash was the principal reason why, in 1953, Waugh agreed to be interviewed on radio by the BBC, first in the Overseas Service's Personal Call programme and then in the Frankly Speaking series. The second of these was broadcast on the BBC Home Service on 16 November 1953. Most of Waugh's friends thought that he had acquitted himself well, (Note: Sykes, for example, thought that "the baiters were tossed and gored with delectable skill throughout", and in his biography wrote that "it was like watching inexperienced toreadors taking on a bull who knew all the tricks of the ring". Stannard contends that the transcripts of the interviews do not fully support this verdict.) and he was mildly pleased with the result, writing to Nancy Mitford that "they tried to make a fool of me and I don't think they entirely succeeded". Nevertheless, the broadcasts preyed on Waugh's mind; he saw hostility in the attitudes of his interlocutors, a point noted by his 13-year-old son Auberon Waugh, who later wrote that the interviews "drove my father mad". His friend, the poet John Betjeman, gave him William Burges's Narcissus washstand but Waugh became convinced that an ornamental tap was missing from the washstand, and was shaken when Betjeman denied the tap had ever existed.

In January 1954 Waugh sailed on the SS Staffordshire, bound for Ceylon. He hoped on the voyage to find the peace that would enable him to finish his stalled book. On board, his strange behaviour became an increasing concern to his fellow-passengers, and the letters which he wrote to his wife Laura from the ship alarmed her—Waugh appeared to be in the grip of a persecution mania in which he was beset by threatening, malevolent voices. He left the ship at Alexandria and flew on to Ceylon, but the voices continued to harass him. He wrote to Laura: "Everything I say or think or read is read aloud by the group of psychologists whom I met in the ship ... the artful creatures can communicate from many hundreds of miles away". Laura arranged for her friend Jack Donaldson to fly out with her to Colombo to bring Waugh home, but before they could do so Waugh returned to London of his own volition. There he was persuaded by his friend, the Jesuit priest Philip Caraman, (Note: Fr Philip Caraman (1911–1998) was the editor of the Catholic journal Month. He had provided Waugh with the historical background for Helena.) to accept treatment from Eric Strauss, the head of psychiatry at St Bartholomew's Hospital. Strauss quickly diagnosed that Waugh's delusions arose from poisoning by his sleeping drugs, and substituted paraldehyde for chloral. The hallucinations disappeared immediately, and Waugh recovered his senses.

== Writing history ==
Christopher Sykes, Waugh's friend and first biographer, believes that during his sessions with Strauss, Waugh may have discussed the idea of writing a fictional account of his hallucinatory experiences. He may have prepared a brief draft, but if so this has not come to light. In the three months following his return to his home, Piers Court at Stinchcombe in Gloucestershire, Waugh was inactive; when he resumed work his first task was to complete his Sword of Honour novel, Officers and Gentlemen, which occupied him for most of the rest of 1954. In late December or early January 1955 he left for Jamaica for his usual winter in the sunshine, and began work on his new novel there. He chose the name "Pinfold" for his protagonist, after a recusant family that had once owned Piers Court.

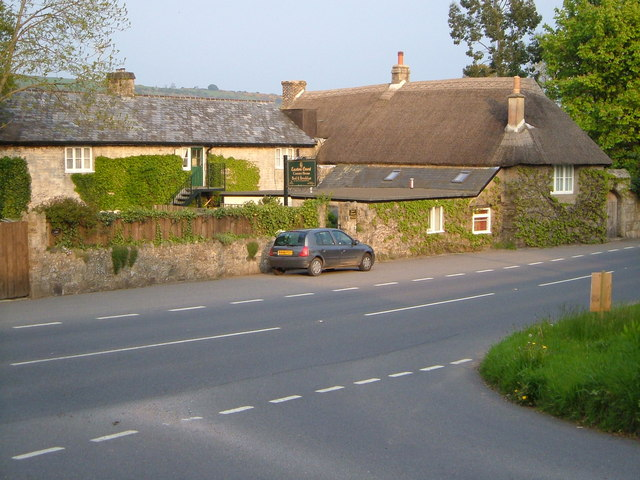
The Easton Court Hotel, Chagford, Waugh's bolthole where he finished writing Pinfold

Waugh worked on the Pinfold novel intermittently during the next two years. After his return from Jamaica he set the book aside, confining his writing to journalism and occasional prefaces—"neat little literary jobs". There is no mention of Pinfold in his diary or in letters. Waugh's biographer Martin Stannard describes Waugh at this time as physically lazy, unable to harness his still considerable mental energies—the diary entry for 12 July 1955 notes the pattern of his days: "the morning post, the newspaper, the crossword, gin". Waugh's longstanding feud with the Beaverbrook press preoccupied him, particularly after an uninvited visit to Piers Court by the Daily Express journalist Nancy Spain in June, that left Waugh "tremulous with rage". In March 1956 Spain attacked Waugh in an Express article, after which he began a libel action against her and her paper. (Note: The libel arose from Spain's assertion that Evelyn Waugh's novels had consistently been outsold by those of his brother, Alec. Waugh won the case and was awarded £2,000 damages.) Meanwhile, preparations for his daughter Teresa's coming-out ball provided a further hindrance to progress on the novel. It is not until 11 September 1956 that his diary records: "I have resumed work on Pinfold". Soon after, he was writing 1,000 words a day—on 26 September he told his friend Ann Fleming (Note: Ann Fleming, formerly Viscountess Rothermere, was a socialite, the wife of the novelist Ian Fleming. From 1952 she was one of Waugh's most regular correspondents, a link to the world of London gossip from which he had largely withdrawn.) that "the mad book is going to be very funny I believe". A week later he asked his friend Daphne Fielding for permission to dedicate the book to her.

Waugh had decided in the summer of 1955 that he would sell Piers Court. By October 1956 the sale had been completed and he had acquired a new home in the Somerset village of Combe Florey. While the chaos of the move went on around him, Waugh worked on the novel; in November he moved to his pre-war bolthole, the Easton Court Hotel at Chagford, where he hoped to finish the book. As the date for the libel case against Nancy Spain and the Express approached, Waugh was involved in a second libel action, against the author and journalist Rebecca West and Pan Books, (Note: The Pan Books reissue of West's The Meaning of Treason included words that might be read as suggesting that Waugh's writings had encouraged treason. Waugh accepted an apology, costs and the withdrawal of unsold copies of the book. He sought and won damages from the Daily Express which had printed extracts from the book.) an additional distraction that delayed the novel's completion. In January 1957 Waugh rewrote the ending, creating a circularity with a return to the words that introduce the novel, and also gave the book its subtitle, "A Conversation Piece". Waugh did not explain his choice of wording for the subtitle, but David Wykes in his literary biography believes it is an ironic reference to the traditional British paintings of families and friends in social gatherings; in this case the "conversation" is with enemies, not friends. The main title is an echo of George Meredith's Victorian novel The Ordeal of Richard Feverel. By the end of January 1957 the book was in the publishers' hands.

== Themes ==
=== Autobiography ===
Waugh confirmed the autobiographical basis for the novel on several occasions; at the book's launch on 19 July 1957, to Robert Henriques in a letter of 15 August 1957 ("Mr Pinfold's experiences were almost exactly my own."), and to John Freeman in a Face to Face television interview in 1960. As well as the congruence with real life of specific incidents in the book, Pinfold's age and his domestic and professional circumstances as revealed in the first chapter closely mirror Waugh's. The fictional counterpart shares Waugh's aversions to modern life; he hates "plastic, Picasso, sunbathing and jazz—everything, in fact, that had happened in his own lifetime". Pinfold expresses the same attitude towards his books—"objects that he had made, things quite external to himself"—that Waugh had demonstrated in the second of his 1953 radio interviews.

"I ask myself: 'Is this novel autobiography?' It is certainly a picture of hell on earth. It is not a picture of madness but of the stages leading to it. I have an idea that most of us are haunted by voices such as these."

— John Betjeman, The Daily Telegraph, 19 June 1957

The BBC interviewer Stephen Black appears in the novel as "Angel", and other associates of Waugh make brief appearances. The poet John Betjeman is represented as "James Lance", Waugh's priest Philip Caraman is "Father Westmacott", and Christopher Sykes is "Roger Stillingfleet". In his biography Sykes maintains that the depiction of Mrs Pinfold does not represent Laura Waugh to any degree—"not the glimmer of a resemblance". The name "Margaret", awarded to Pinfold's gentler tormentor, was that of Waugh's second daughter for whom, he wrote to Ann Fleming in September 1952, he had developed a sexual passion. When cured of his hallucinations, Waugh confided to Nancy Mitford that his "unhealthy affection" for his daughter Margaret had disappeared.

Pinfold's adopted defensive persona, "a combination of eccentric don and testy colonel", was the same that Waugh cultivated to keep the world at bay. Pinfold adheres to an outmoded form of Toryism, does not vote, and expresses outrageous views, part-facetiously. Pinfold was "absurd to many but to some rather formidable". After Waugh's death, Nancy Mitford confirmed the essentially mocking nature of Waugh's persona: "What nobody remembers about Evelyn is that everything with him was jokes. Everything". While Waugh's biographer Selina Hastings describes Pinfold as "an accurate and revealing self-portrait", Stannard suggests that it is primarily an analysis of the adopted persona in which, like Pinfold, Waugh "gives nothing away".

=== Paranormal ===
Among Waugh's neighbours in Stinchcombe was Diana Oldridge, known in the Waugh family as "Tanker". She was an organiser of local music festivals, and the possessor of a contraption known as "the Box". This device was reputed to cure all ills, by means of "sympathetic life-waves" working on some physical part of the victim—hairs, nail-clippings, or a drop of blood. Waugh himself was generally sceptical, even scornful of these powers, but some of his acquaintances claimed to have been cured by the Box, as apparently had one of Laura Waugh's cows. In letters to Laura from Cairo and Colombo, Waugh ascribed the voices he was hearing to the power of the Box, and instructs Laura to tell "Tanker" that he now believes in it.

In the novel, Pinfold initially dismisses the Box—described as resembling "a makeshift wireless set"—as "a lot of harmless nonsense", but, like Waugh, he is driven to revise his position in the face of his persecution by the voices. He believes that "Angel" is using an adapted form of the Box, as developed by the Germans at the end of the war and perfected by the "Existentialists" in Paris—"a hellish invention in the wrong hands". At the end of his ordeal Pinfold muses that had he not defied Angel but instead compromised with him, he might have continued to believe in the Box's sinister capabilities. He is finally convinced of the non-existence of a box with such powers by the assurances of his priest, Father Westmacott.

=== Religion ===
In contrast with Waugh's other late full-length fiction, religious themes are not prominent in Pinfold. As with earlier novels, the "Catholic gentleman" is subject to a degree of ridicule and mockery; the voices speculate that Pinfold is Jewish, that his real name is "Peinfeld" and that his professed Catholicism is mere humbug invented to ingratiate himself with the aristocracy. Otherwise, Waugh uses the self-revelatory opening chapter of the novel to attribute to Pinfold his own traditional Roman Catholic beliefs. Pinfold is a convert, received into the Church in early manhood on the basis of a "calm acceptance of the propositions of his faith", rather than through than a dramatic or emotional event. While the Church was encouraging its adherents to engage with society and political institutions, Pinfold, like Waugh, "burrowed ever deeper into the rock, [holding himself] aloof from the multifarious organisations which have sprung into being at the summons of the hierarchy to redeem the times".

== Publication and reception ==
=== Publication history ===
In an undated postcard (probably late 1956) to John McDougall of Chapman & Hall, Waugh's publishers, Waugh asks that McDougall seek permission from Francis Bacon to use one of the artist's works as an image on the dust-jacket of the new novel. Jacobs considers this a "startling" request, given Waugh's known antipathy to modern art. Waugh probably had in mind one of Bacon's heads from the series generally referred to as the "screaming popes"—perhaps Head VI, which Waugh may have seen at Bacon's 1949 exhibition at the Hanover Gallery. No such arrangement with the painter was possible. Waugh was dissatisfied with the illustration that the publishers finally produced, and on 17 June 1957 wrote to Ann Fleming complaining that McDougall had made "an ugly book of poor Pinfold".

The novel was published by Chapman and Hall in the UK on 19 July 1957, and by Little, Brown in the US on 12 August. The Daily Telegraph had partly revealed the book's principal theme three months earlier: "The publishers hope to establish 'Pinfold' as a household word meaning 'half round the bend'." This comment followed closely on the release of Muriel Spark's first novel, The Comforters, which also dealt with issues of drug-induced hallucination. Although it would have been in Waugh's commercial interests to have ignored or downplayed Spark's book, he reviewed it generously in The Spectator on 22 February 1957: "a complicated, subtle and, to me at least, an intensely interesting first novel".

A special edition of 50 copies of Pinfold, on large paper, was prepared at Waugh's expense for presentation to his friends. The first Penguin paperback was issued in 1962, followed by numerous reissues in the following years, including a Penguin Modern Classic edition in 1999. It has also been translated into several languages. (Note: French (1958), German (1958), Spanish (1959), Italian (1967), and Russian (1992).)

=== Critical reception ===
On the day that Pinfold was published, Waugh was persuaded to attend a Foyle's Literary Luncheon, as a means of promoting the book. He informed his audience that "Three years ago, I had quite a new experience. I went off my head for about three weeks". To further stimulate sales the dust-jacket also emphasised Waugh's experiences of madness, which brought him a large correspondence from strangers anxious to relate their own parallel experiences—"the voices ... of the persecuted, turning to him as confessor".

"But it was exciting. It was the most exciting thing, really, that ever happened to me".

— "Pinfold" summarises his ordeal.

Waugh's friends were generally enthusiastic about the book. Anthony Powell thought that it was one of Waugh's most interesting works, and Graham Greene placed it among the writer's best fiction. The Donaldsons thought that he had "succeeded wonderfully" in providing so vivid an account of his experiences. John Betjeman, reviewing the book for The Daily Telegraph, wrote: "The Ordeal of Gilbert Pinfold is self-examination written as a novel, but unlike other such works, which are generally dreary and self-pitying, this, because it is by Mr Waugh, is readable, thrilling and detached". Other reviewers were generally more circumspect. Philip Toynbee in The Observer found it "very hard to say whether it is a good book or not; it is certainly an interesting and a moving one". He sensed in Waugh's writing a "change of gear", a point picked up by John Raymond in the New Statesman. Raymond thought Waugh was the only current English novelist whose work showed signs of development, and that in Pinfold had produced "one of his wittiest, most humane entertainments", a work of self-revelation only marred, in Raymond's view, by an unsatisfactory conclusion. The Times Literary Supplement's reviewer R. G. G. Price deemed it a "thin little tale", while acknowledging that Waugh as a comic writer could reasonably be compared with P. G. Wodehouse in terms of originality and humour.

Donat O'Donnell in The Spectator was dismissive, calling the story "moderately interesting, almost entirely unfunny and a little embarrassing". On the book's autobiographical nature O'Donnell commented: "The Waugh of before Brideshead seldom wrote about himself; the Waugh of after Brideshead seldom writes about anything else". Reviewing the American edition in The New York Times, Orville Prescott found the book's central situation far too slight for a full-length novel; furthermore, "the reader's knowledge that the voices are delusions robs Mr Waugh's story of any narrative conflict or suspense ... Mr Pinfold's ordeal is neither humorous nor pathetic".

A few weeks after the book's publication, the novelist J. B. Priestley, in a long essay in the New Statesman entitled "What Was Wrong With Pinfold", offered the theory that Waugh had been driven to the verge of madness not by an unfortunate cocktail of drugs but by his inability to reconcile his role as a writer with his desire to be a country squire. He concluded: "Pinfold [Waugh] must step out of his role as the Cotswold gentleman quietly regretting the Reform Bill of 1832, and if he cannot discover an accepted role as English man of letters ... he must create one." Waugh replied mockingly, drawing attention to Priestley's large land-holdings and surmising that "what gets Mr Priestley's goat (supposing that he allows such a deleterious animal in his lush pastures) is my attempt to behave as a gentleman".

Later opinions of the book, expressed by Waugh's eventual biographers, are mixed. Sykes considered the beginning to be one of the best pieces of autobiographical writing, but found the ending "weak & sentimental". Stannard, writing in 1984, did not consider the book a major work in the Waugh canon. Hastings in 1994, however, thought it "by any criteria an extraordinary work", and credited it with establishing Waugh's public image: "stout and splenetic, red-faced and reactionary". David Wykes (1999) considers that this "very controlled short novel" demonstrates that "Waugh was not very good at invention, but was unsurpassed at embroidery".

== Adaptations ==
In 1960 Waugh accepted a fee of £250 from the BBC for an adaptation of Pinfold, as a radio play, by Michael Bakewell. The broadcast, on 7 June 1960, was well received by the critics; Waugh did not listen to it. In September 1977 a staged version of the book, written by Ronald Harwood and directed by Michael Elliott, opened at the Royal Exchange theatre, Manchester. The play was brought to London, and performed at the Roundhouse Theatre in February 1979, where Michael Hordern's depiction of Pinfold was highly praised—"a man suffering from chronic indigestion of the soul".

During 1962 Sykes was approached by the Russian-American composer Nicolas Nabokov, who was interested in making an opera from the Pinfold story on the basis of a libretto provided by Sykes. Waugh gave his approval to the idea, and in March 1962 met with Nabokov. Discussions continued during the following months, before the project was abandoned in the summer.

== Notes and references ==
=== Sources ===
- Amory, Mark, ed. (1995). The Letters of Evelyn Waugh. London: Phoenix. ISBN 1-85799-245-8. (Originally published by Weidenfeld and Nicolson, London 1980)
- Byrne, Paula (2010). Mad World: Evelyn Waugh and the Secrets of Brideshead. London: Harper Press. ISBN 978-0-00-724377-8.
- Carpenter, Humphrey (2013). The Brideshead Generation: Evelyn Waugh and his Friends. London: Faber and Faber. ISBN 978-0-571-30928-3.
- Christopher Adam's Review of The Ordeal of Gilbert Pinfold. 24 July 2019.
- Davie, Michael, ed. (1976). The Diaries of Evelyn Waugh. London: Weidenfeld and Nicolson. ISBN 0-297-77126-4.
- Giroud, Vincent (2015). Nicolas Nabokov: A Life in Freedom and Music. Oxford: Oxford University Press. ISBN 978-0-19-939989-5.
- Hastings, Selina (1994). Evelyn Waugh: A Biography. London: Sinclair-Stevenson. ISBN 1-85619-223-7.
- Heath, Jeffrey (1982). The Picturesque Prison: Evelyn Waugh and his Writing. Montreal: McGill-Queens University Press. p. 264. ISBN 0-7735-0377-3. "Gilbert Pinfold."
- Jacobs, Richard (1998). "Introduction" and "Notes on the Text". Penguin Twentieth Century Classics: The Ordeal of Gilbert Pinfold. London: Penguin Books. ISBN 978-0-14-118021-2.
- McVeigh, Diana (2005). Gerald Finzi: His Life and Music. Woodbridge, Suffolk: The Boydell Press. ISBN 978-1-84383-170-9.
- Stannard, Martin (1984). Evelyn Waugh: The Critical Heritage. London: Routledge. ISBN 0-415-15924-5.
- Stannard, Martin (1992). Evelyn Waugh, Volume II: No Abiding City 1939–1966. London: Flamingo. ISBN 0-586-08680-3.
- Sykes, Christopher (1975). Evelyn Waugh: A Biography. London: Collins. ISBN 0-00-211202-7.
- Waugh, Evelyn (1998). The Ordeal of Gilbert Pinfold. London: Penguin Books. ISBN 978-0-14-118021-2.
- Wicker, Brian (2013). The Story-Shaped World: Fiction and Metaphysics: Some Variations on a Theme. London: Bloomsbury Publishing. ISBN 978-1-4725-0784-6.
- Wykes, David (1999). Evelyn Waugh: A Literary Life. London: Macmillan. ISBN 0-333-61138-1.
