= Stroud and District Combination Bill Adams Cup =

- Sport: Rugby Union
- Instituted: 1983; 43 years ago
- Number of teams: 4
- Country: England
- Holders: Cirencester III (15th title) (2017–18)
- Most titles: Cirencester III (15 titles)
- Website: Gloucestershire RFU

The Stroud and District Combination Bill Adams Cup is an annual rugby union knock-out club competition organised by the Stroud and District Combination – one of the five bodies that make up the Gloucestershire Rugby Football Union. It was first introduced during the 1983–84 season, with the first ever winners being Cirencester III. The Bill Adams Cup is the third most important cup competition in Stroud District behind the Senior Cup (1st) and Stroud and District Combination Junior Cup (2nd). With only 9 member clubs the combination is one of the smallest in Gloucestershire.

The Bill Adams Cup is currently open to the 2nd and 3rd teams of clubs location within the Stroud District. The format is a knock-out cup with semi-finals and a final, with the final to be held a neutral ground between March–May.

== Stroud and District Combination Bill Adams Cup winners ==
Stroud and District Combination Bill Adams Cup Finals
Season	Winner	Score	Runners–up	Venue
1983–84	Cirencester III			
1984–85	Dursley III			
1985–86	Royal Agricultural College III			
1986–87	Minchinhampton II			
1987–88	Painswick III			
1988–89	Cirencester III			
1989–90	Cainscross III			
1990–91	Dursley III			
1991–92	Cirencester III			
1992–93	Dursley III			
1993–94	Dursley III			
1994–95	Dursley III			
1995–96	Dursley III			
1996–97	Cirencester III			
1997–98	Dursley III			
1998–99	Cirencester III			
1999-00	Minchinhampton II			
2000–01	Fairford II			
2001–02	Wotton-under-Edge II			
2002–03	Cirencester III			
2003–04	Dursley III		Fairford II	Fromehill Park, Stroud, Gloucestershire
2004–05	Dursley III			
2005–06	Cirencester III			
2006–07	Cirencester III			
2007–08	Cirencester III			
2008–09	Dursley III	32–18	Cirencester III	
2009–10	Cirencester III	8–6	Dursley III	
2010–11	Cirencester III		Dursley III	
2011–12	Cirencester III			
2012–13	Cirencester III	25–10	Dursley III	Hounds Green, Stinchcombe, Gloucestershire
2013–14	Cirencester III	22–20	Dursley III	Hounds Green, Stinchcombe, Gloucestershire
2014–15	Dursley III	21–10	Cirencester III	Hounds Green, Stinchcombe, Gloucestershire
2015–16	Dursley III	32–10	Minchinhampton II	Broadham Fields, Painswick, Gloucestershire
2016–17	Tetbury II		Dursley III	The Recreation Ground, Tetbury, Gloucestershire
2017–18	Cirencester III	59–35	Dursley III	Walnut Tree Field, Fairford, Gloucestershire

== Number of wins ==
- Cirencester III (15)
- Dursley III (12)
- Minchinhampton II (2)
- Cainscross III (1)
- Fairford II (1)
- Painswick III (1)
- Royal Agricultural College III (1)
- Tetbury II (1)
- Wotton-under-Edge II (1)

== See also ==
- Gloucestershire RFU
- Stroud & District Combination Senior Cup
- Stroud & District Combination Junior Cup
- English rugby union system
- Rugby union in England
