= William Onslow =

William Onslow may refer to:

- William Onslow, 4th Earl of Onslow (1853–1911)
- William Onslow, 6th Earl of Onslow (1913–1971)
