= Pamela Onslow, Countess of Onslow =

English socialite

Pamela Onslow
- Born: Hon. Pamela Louisa Eleanor Dillon; August 26, 1915; Dorchester, Dorset, England
- Died: April 14, 1992 (aged 76); Kensington, London, England
- Occupation(s): Socialite, Justice of the Peace
- Spouse: William Onslow, 6th Earl of Onslow
- Children: Michael Onslow, 7th Earl of Onslow, Lady Teresa Lorraine Onslow

Pamela Louisa Eleanor Onslow, Countess of Onslow (née Hon. Pamela Louisa Eleanor Dillon; 26 August 1915 – 14 April 1992) was an English socialite.

== Early life ==
Lady Onslow was born in Dorchester, Dorset, the daughter of Brigadier Eric Dillon, 19th Viscount Dillon CMG DSO and his wife Nora Juanita Muriel Beckett.

== Marriage and children ==
She married William Onslow, 6th Earl of Onslow (then styled Viscount Cranley) on 4 August 1936, several weeks before her 21st birthday. The couple had two children before divorcing in 1962:

- Michael William Coplestone Dillon Onslow, 7th Earl of Onslow (28 February 1938 – 14 May 2011)
- Lady Teresa Lorraine Onslow (born 26 February 1940), married writer Auberon Waugh.

== Other activities ==
Lady Onslow held the office of Justice of the Peace (JP) for Guildford in 1950.

== Littlejohn Affair ==
Lady Onslow was involved in the Littlejohn Affair, a spy scandal involving an alleged MI6 double agent, Kenneth Littlejohn, whom she had met when visiting prison in the 1960s. She reportedly introduced Littlejohn to the British security forces who later used Littlejohn in anti-IRA operations. In 1975, she received a letter bomb which failed to detonate properly, causing only minor injuries. She reportedly declined hospital treatment for the injuries.

== Death ==
Lady Onslow died in Kensington, London in 1992, aged 76.
