= Lady Teresa Waugh =

British novelist and translator (born 1940)

Lady Teresa Lorraine Waugh (née Onslow; born 26 February 1940) is a British novelist and translator.

== Early life ==
Waugh was born at 11 Ormonde Gate, Chelsea, London, the daughter of William Onslow, 6th Earl of Onslow (then Viscount Cranley) and his first wife Hon Pamela Dillon, daughter of Eric Dillon, 19th Viscount Dillon.

== Career ==
Waugh has translated such works as Anka Muhlstein's A Taste For Freedom: The life of Astolphe de Custine (2000), Benedetta Craveri's Madame Du Deffand and Her World (1994) and The Travels of Marco Polo (1984). In 1980, she translated Shah's Story by Mohammad Reza Pahlavi (previously Shah of Iran from 1941 to 1979) from French to English.

Her own novels include Painting Water (1983), Waterloo Waterloo (1985), An Intolerable Burden (1987), Song at Twilight (1989), The House (2002), Sylvia's Lot (1994) and The Gossips (1995). The Entertaining Book (1986) is not a novel but a book about food and wine written with her husband.

== Marriage and children ==
On 1 July 1961, as Lady Teresa Onslow, she married the author Auberon Waugh, eldest son of Evelyn Waugh. Auberon and Teresa Waugh had four children together:

- Margaret Sophia Laura Waugh (born 1962)
- Alexander Evelyn Michael Waugh (30 December 1963 – 22 July 2024)
- Daisy Louisa Dominica Waugh (born 1967)
- Nathaniel Thomas Biafra Waugh (born 1968).
