= Stroud and District Combination Junior Cup =

- Sport: Rugby Union
- Instituted: 1976; 50 years ago
- Number of teams: 8
- Country: England
- Holders: Fairford (2nd title) (2017–18)
- Most titles: Cirencester II, Dursley II (9 titles)
- Website: Gloucestershire RFU

The Stroud and District Combination Junior Cup is an annual rugby union knock-out club competition organised by the Stroud and District Combination – one of the five bodies that make up the Gloucestershire Rugby Football Union. It was first introduced during the 1976–77 season, with the inaugural winners being Royal Agricultural College II. For the 2004–05 season a Junior Plate competition was introduced (Painswick RFC donated the plate) for teams that were knocked out of the first round of the Junior Cup, with Tetbury being the first winners. The Junior Cup is the second most important cup in Stroud District, behind the Senior Cup but ahead of the Bill Adams Cup. With only 9 member clubs the combination is one of the smallest in Gloucestershire.

The Junior Cup is currently open to the 1st teams of lower ranked clubs in Stroud District as well as 2nd teams of the larger clubs. The format is a knock-out cup with quarter finals, semi-finals and a final to be held at a neutral ground between March–May. Clubs knocked out at the quarter-final stage enter the Junior Plate competition which has a semi-final and final – also played at the same ground and date as the Junior Cup final.

== Stroud and District Combination Junior Cup winners ==
Stroud and District Combination Junior Cup Finals
Season	Winner	Score	Runners–up	Venue
1976–77	Royal Agricultural College II			
1977–78	Cainscross II			
1978–79	Royal Agricultural College II			
1979–80	Dursley II			
1980–81	Cainscross II			
1981–82	Cirencester II			
1982–83	Cirencester II			
1983–84	Minety II			
1984–85	Royal Agricultural College II			
1985–86	Cirencester II			
1986–87	Dursley II			
1987–88				
1988–89				
1989–90	Cirencester II			
1990–91				
1991–92				
1992–93				
1993–94				
1994–95	Painswick II			
1995–96				
1996–97	Cirencester II			
1997–98				
1998–99				
1999-00				
2000–01				
2001–02	Cirencester II			
2002–03	Dursley II	17–7	Painswick II	Fromehall Park, Stroud, Gloucestershire
2003–04	Dursley II	49–17	Cirencester II	Fromehall Park, Stroud, Gloucestershire
2004–05	Dursley II		Painswick II	
2005–06	Dursley II	12–7	Wotton-under-Edge	Fromehall Park, Stroud, Gloucestershire
2006–07	Dursley II			
2007–08	Painswick II			
2008–09	Cirencester II		Painswick II	
2009–10	Dursley II	28–13	Painswick II	Hounds Green, Stinchcombe, Gloucestershire
2010–11	Tetbury	16–11	Dursley II	
2011–12	Cirencester II			
2012–13	Stroud II			Hounds Green, Stinchcombe, Gloucestershire
2013–14	Stroud II			
2014–15	Cirencester II	41–31	Stroud II	The Whiteway, Cirencester, Gloucestershire
2015–16	Dursley II	19–19 (Note: Despite the 2015–16 final finishing 19–19 Dursley II won the cup as they scored more tries during the game.)	Fairford	The Whiteway, Cirencester, Gloucestershire
2016–17	Fairford	19–18	Stroud II	The Whiteway, Cirencester, Gloucestershire
2017–18	Fairford	70–5	Dursley II	Hounds Green, Stinchcombe, Gloucestershire

== Stroud and District Combination Junior Plate winners ==
Stroud and District Combination Junior Plate Finals
Season	Winner	Score	Runners–up	Venue
2004–05	Tetbury			
2005–06	Stroud II			
2006–07	Stroud II			
2007–08	Painswick II			
2008–09				
2009–10	Cirencester II		Wotton-under-Edge	Hounds Green, Stinchcombe, Gloucestershire
2010–11	Fairford	20–17	Painswick II	Fromehall Park, Stroud, Gloucestershire
2011–12	Stroud II			
2012–13	Dursley II			
2013–14	Caincross	17–16	Cirencester II	Broadham Fields, Painswick, Gloucestershire
2014–15	Fairford			
2015–16	Cirencester II	25–10	Minchampton	The Whiteway, Cirencester, Gloucestershire
2016–17	Painswick			
2017–18	Cirencester II	12–10	Cainscross II	Hounds Green, Stinchcombe, Gloucestershire

== Number of wins ==
=== Cup ===
- Cirencester II (9)
- Dursley II (9)
- Royal Agricultural College II (3)
- Cainscross II (2)
- Fairford (2)
- Painswick II (2)
- Stroud II (2)
- Minety II (1)
- Tetbury (1)

=== Plate ===
- Cirencester II (3)
- Stroud II (3)
- Fairford (2)
- Caincross (1)
- Dursley II (1)
- Painswick (1)
- Painswick II (1)
- Tetbury (1)

== See also ==
- Gloucestershire RFU
- Stroud & District Combination Senior Cup
- Stroud & District Combination Bill Adams Cup
- English rugby union system
- Rugby union in England
