= Piers Court =

Country house in Gloucestershire, England, United Kingdom

- Location within Gloucestershire
- 51°41′12″N 2°23′14″W
- Type: Country house
- Location: Stinchcombe, Gloucestershire

History
- Built: late 18th century with earlier work

Site notes
- Architectural style: Palladian
- Owner: Private

Listed Building – Grade II*
- Official name: Piers Court
- Designated: 2 June 1952
- Reference no.: 1305626

Listed Building – Grade II
- Official name: Stable block southwest of Piers Court
- Designated: 23 June 1952
- Reference no.: 1090881

Piers Court is a country house in Stinchcombe on the Cotswold Edge in Gloucestershire, England. A Grade II* listed building, in the mid-20th century the court was home to the novelist Evelyn Waugh.

== History ==
The present house was built by John Wallington at the very end of the 18th century. It incorporates elements of an older building.

Evelyn Waugh lived at Piers Court from 1937 to 1956, and wrote many of his best known works there, including Scoop, Brideshead Revisited, Men at Arms and Officers and Gentlemen. (Note: Although many sources indicate that Waugh wrote Brideshead Revisited at Piers Court, the Evelyn Waugh Society notes that the book was written in 1944, while the house was let. The society suggests that the book was written while Waugh was staying at Chagford in Devon, and revised while he was on active service in Yugoslavia.) In 1955 Waugh was enraged when two journalists from the Daily Express, Nancy Spain and Noel Buxton arrived at Piers Court, having previously been declined an interview. An acrimonious and public correspondence saw Waugh successfully sue Spain for libel. But his enjoyment of the house was marred and he sold it the following year. (Note: In a letter to Ann Fleming dated 7 November 1956, Waugh described his leaving; "I have had a gruesome week. Left Stinkers [his name for Piers Court, a play on Stinchcombe, the house's location] for good and drove to Lancashire to entertain my dreadful little boy at Stoneyhurst.") (Note: Having viewed a range of alternatives, Waugh moved to Combe Florey House in Somerset where he died in 1966.)

Waugh's library at Piers Court was sold by a subsequent owner and the fixtures and fittings, including the prominent bookcases, were sent to the US with the intention of reconstructing the library in a museum. (Note: Waugh’s books are now held at the Harry Ransom Center at the University of Texas at Austin.)

In December 2022, the court was sold by auction, for £3.16m. The sales arrangements were unusual, as the presence of sitting tenants precluded potential purchasers from viewing the property.

== Architecture and description ==
The house is built of local stone with the main block consisting of seven bays and two storeys. Historic England's listing record notes that this central block, designed in a Palladian style and dating from the late 18th century, abuts a lower wing with earlier origins, probably of the 16th century. The pediment below the roof is surmounted by an "elaborate" coat of arms. David Verey and Alan Brooks, in their 2000 revised edition of Gloucestershire 1: The Cotswolds, in the Pevsner Buildings of England series, describe Piers Court as a "dignified and elegant house." It was designated a Grade II* listed building in 1952. The adjacent stable block is listed at Grade II.

== Sources ==
- Mitford, Nancy; Waugh, Evelyn (1996). Charlotte Mosley (ed.). The Letters of Nancy Mitford and Evelyn Waugh. London: Hodder & Stoughton. ISBN 978-0-340-63804-0.
- Page, Norman (1997). An Evelyn Waugh Chronology. New York: Springer Publishing. ISBN 978-0-230-37254-2.
- Verey, David; Brooks, Alan (2000) [1970]. Gloucestershire 1: The Cotswolds. The Buildings of England. London: Penguin Books. ISBN 0-14-071098-1.
- Waugh, Evelyn (1995) [1980]. Mark Amory (ed.). The Letters of Evelyn Waugh. London: Phoenix. ISBN 1-85799-245-8.
