= Unconditional surrender (disambiguation) =

An unconditional surrender is a surrender without conditions except for those provided by international law.

Unconditional surrender may also refer to:

- Unconditional Surrender (novel), a 1961 novel by Evelyn Waugh
- Unconditional Surrender (sculpture), a 2005 statue by John Seward Johnson II
- Ulysses S. Grant (1822–1885), nickname Unconditional Surrender Grant, the 18th president of the United States
