= Combe Florey House =

Country house in Somerset, England, United Kingdom

- Location within Somerset
- 51.0744°N 3.2128°W
- Location: Combe Florey, Somerset, England

Site notes
- Owner: Private

Listed Building – Grade II
- Official name: Combe Florey House, Flanking Steps and Balustrade
- Designated: 25 February 1955
- Reference no.: 1059227

Listed Building – Grade II*
- Official name: Gatehouse at Combe Florey House
- Designated: 25 February 1955
- Reference no.: 1059226

Listed Building – Grade II
- Official name: Well Head 5M south of gatehouse at Combe Florey House
- Designated: 4 May 1984
- Reference no.: 1344855

Combe Florey House in Combe Florey, Somerset, England is a country house dating from the early 18th century. It replaced an Elizabethan manor house which was pulled down after the English Civil War. The gatehouse to the original manor survives. In the mid-20th century, the house was home to the writer Evelyn Waugh who died there in 1966 and is buried next to the churchyard of the adjacent Church of St Peter & St Paul. Combe Florey House is a Grade II listed building.

== History ==
The original house at Combe Florey was an Elizabethan manor built by John Fraunceis. This manor was demolished after the English Civil War but the gatehouse remains. In the early 18th century John Fraunceis' descendant, William Fraunceis built a new house on a site further up the hillside from the gatehouse. The house passed out of the ownership of the Fraunceis family in 1799.

In 1955 the novelist Evelyn Waugh determined to sell his home, Piers Court in Gloucestershire. (Note: Waugh had been seriously affronted when two journalist from the Daily Express, Nancy Spain and Noel Buxton, arrived at Piers Court, having previously been declined an interview. An acrimonious and public correspondence saw Waugh successfully sue Spain for libel. But his enjoyment of the house was marred and he sold it the following year.) Having viewed a range of alternatives, Waugh alighted on the hamlet of Combe Florey in Somerset, where Combe Florey House was for sale. Waugh considered that "it has possibilities of beautification", writing to his close friend Nancy Mitford, "If only I were a pansy without family cares I could make it a jewel." (Note: In a letter to Ann Fleming dated 2 September 1959, congratulating her on the purchase of Sevenhampton Manor in Wiltshire, Waugh lamented the increased costs associated with renovating a house; "Have you any idea of the costs of building these days? Five plain stone steps have cost me £200. Simple balustrading is now £20 a yard.") Waugh's offer of £7,500 for the house was accepted in September 1956. Waugh lived at Combe Florey for the next ten years. It was not a happy decade; becoming increasingly reclusive and paranoid, Waugh was nevertheless able to undertake some substantial work, including his biography of Ronald Knox. Waugh died at the house on Easter Day 1966. He was buried just outside of the churchyard of the Church of St Peter & St Paul in a ha-ha which separates the house from the church. (Note: Waugh's grave has been subject to deterioration. In 2016, his daughter-in-law, Teresa, who lived at Combe Florey in the early 21st century, wrote of her failed efforts to undertake repairs. Waugh’s youngest son, Septimus, has sought, without success, to have his father’s gravesite incorporated into the churchyard.) Combe Florey was bought from Waugh's widow, Laura, by his son, Auberon who lived at the house until his own death in 2001. In 2008 the house was sold by his family. As of 2022, Combe Florey House was again for sale.

In conjunction with his friend, John Betjeman, Waugh assembled an important collection of furniture by the Victorian art-architect William Burges at Combe Florey. In a letter to his daughter Margaret Fitzherbert dated 30 June 1965 he wrote; "The William Burges furniture has arrived. The settle looks very well between the windows of the morning room. The wardrobe, not so beautiful, but quite suitable opposite the washstand. The gilt gothic whatever-it-is has had to go to the attics." The Narcissus washstand, which had been previously at Piers Court, formed the basis of Waugh's novel, The Ordeal of Gilbert Pinfold. (Note: When Waugh and Betjeman were collecting Burges pieces, the art-architect's reputation was at its nadir, and they paid very low prices. The 21st century has seen prices for works by Burges rise substantially; most of the furniture has now been sold by the Waugh family and has been acquired by museums, or private collections; for example the Zodiac settle was bought by The Higgins Art Gallery & Museum, Bedford, in 2010 for £850,000.)

== Architecture and description ==
Combe Florey House dates from 1730. Of five bays and two storeys, it is built of Red sandstone. Julian Orbach, in his 2014 revised volume, Somerset: South and West, in the Pevsner Buildings of England series, notes the "Gibbsian" influence on the design of the house. Combe Florey is a Grade II listed building. The Elizabethan gatehouse is listed at Grade II*, while an adjacent wellhead dating from the late 18th century is listed at Grade II.

== Gallery ==
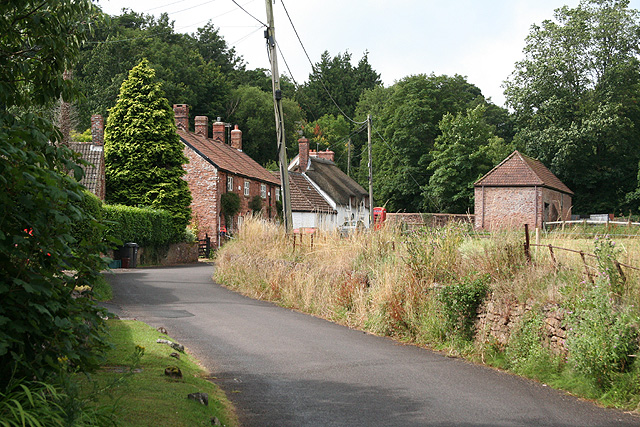
The village of Combe Florey

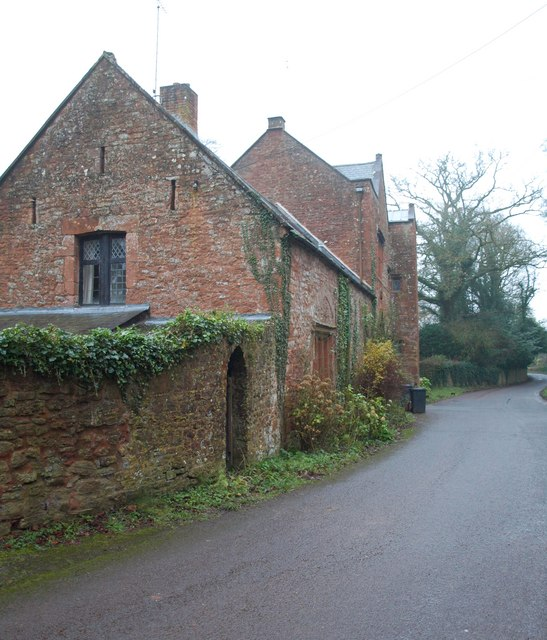
The gatehouse at Combe Florey House

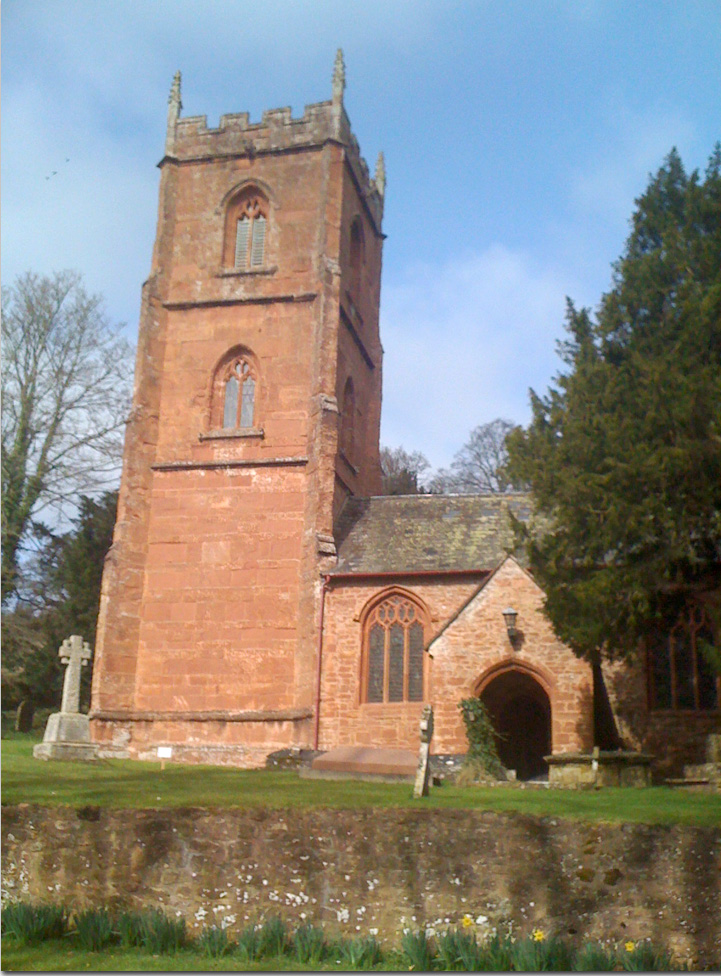
The Church of St Peter & St Paul

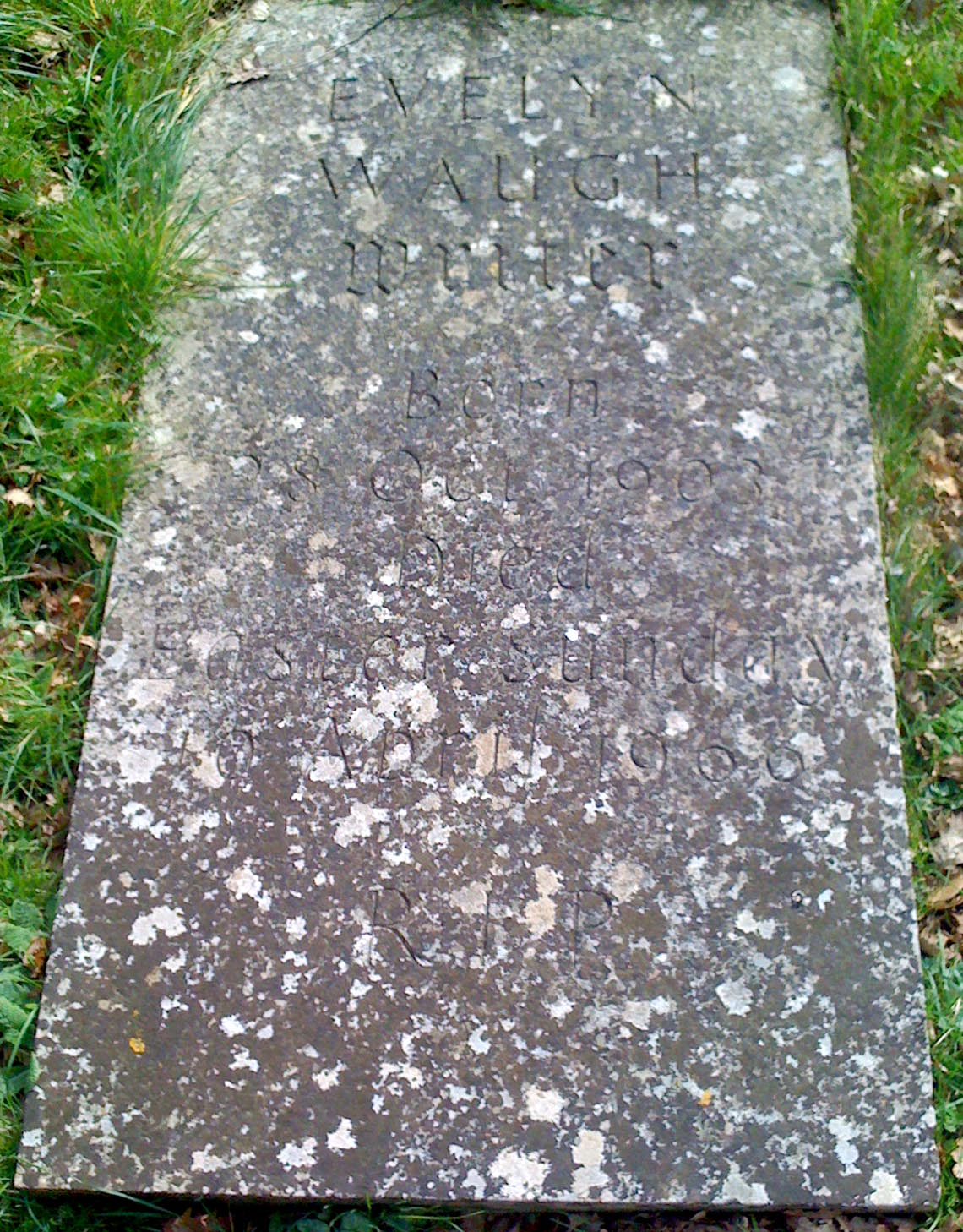
The grave of Evelyn Waugh

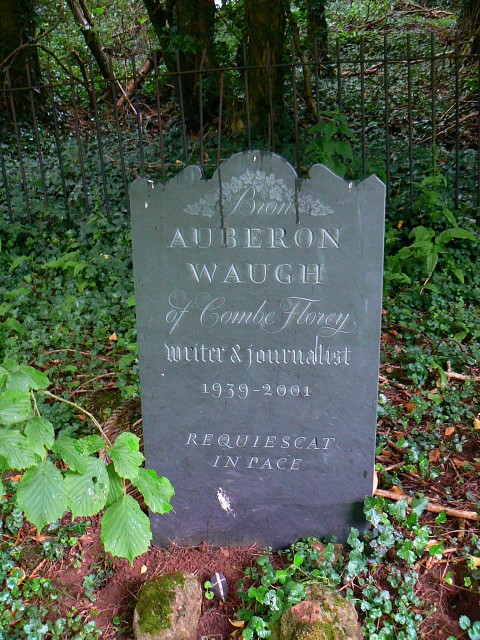
The grave of Auberon Waugh

== Sources ==
- Mitford, Nancy; Waugh, Evelyn (1996). Charlotte Mosley (ed.). The Letters of Nancy Mitford and Evelyn Waugh. London: Hodder & Stoughton. ISBN 978-0-340-63804-0.
- Orbach, Julian; Pevsner, Nikolaus (2014). Somerset: South and West. The Buildings Of England. New Haven, US and London: Yale University Press. ISBN 978-0-300-20740-8. OCLC 898058210.
- Page, Norman (1997). An Evelyn Waugh Chronology. New York: Springer Publishing. ISBN 978-0-230-37254-2.
- Waugh, Evelyn (1995) [1980]. Mark Amory (ed.). The Letters of Evelyn Waugh. London: Phoenix. ISBN 1-85799-245-8.
