= Combe Florey =

Village and civil parish in Somerset, England

Coordinates: 51.0765°N 3.2075°W

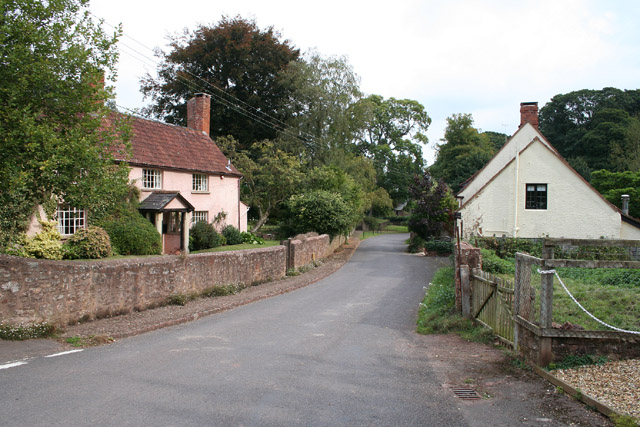
- Village street

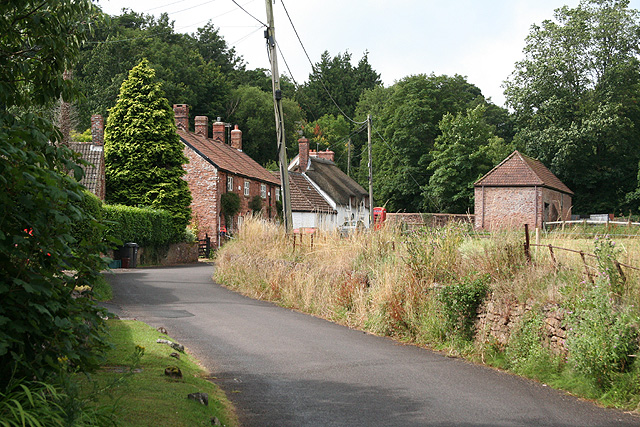
- Near the Old Manor House

- Location within Somerset
- Population: 261 (2011)
- OS grid reference: ST155315
- Unitary authority: Somerset Council
- Ceremonial county: Somerset
- Region: South West
- Country: England
- Sovereign state: United Kingdom
- Post town: TAUNTON
- Postcode district: TA4
- Dialling code: 01823
- Police: Avon and Somerset
- Fire: Devon and Somerset
- Ambulance: South Western
- UK Parliament: Tiverton and Minehead

Combe Florey is a village and civil parish in Somerset, England, situated 6 miles (9.7 km) northwest of Taunton, on the West Somerset Railway. The village has a population of 261. The parish includes the hamlet of Eastcombe which is a linear settlement along the A358 Taunton-Wiliton Road.

The village public house is The Farmer's Arms.

== History ==
The first part of the name Combe Florey comes from cwm meaning valley, and the second part from Hugh de Fleuri who was lord of the manor around 1166.

At the time of the Domesday Book in 1086 the village was part of the Bishop of Winchester's estate of Taunton Deane. The parish of Combe Florey was part of the Taunton Deane Hundred.

== Governance ==
The parish council has responsibility for local issues, including setting an annual precept (local rate) to cover the council's operating costs and producing annual accounts for public scrutiny. The parish council evaluates local planning applications and works with the local police, district council officers, and neighbourhood watch groups on matters of crime, security, and traffic. The parish council's role also includes initiating projects for the maintenance and repair of parish facilities, as well as consulting with the district council on the maintenance, repair, and improvement of highways, drainage, footpaths, public transport, and street cleaning. Conservation matters (including trees and listed buildings) and environmental issues are also the responsibility of the council.

For local government purposes, since 1 April 2023, the village comes under the unitary authority of Somerset Council. Prior to this, it was part of the non-metropolitan district of Somerset West and Taunton (formed on 1 April 2019) and, before this, the district of Taunton Deane (established under the Local Government Act 1972). From 1894-1974, for local government purposes, Combe Florey was part of Taunton Rural District.

It is also part of the Tiverton and Minehead county constituency represented in the House of Commons of the Parliament of the United Kingdom. It elects one Member of Parliament (MP) by the first past the post system of election, and was part of the South West England constituency of the European Parliament prior to Britain leaving the European Union in January 2020, which elected seven MEPs using the d'Hondt method of party-list proportional representation.

== Religious sites ==
The Church of St Peter and St Paul has some remains from the 13th century but is mostly from the 15th century and is designated as a Grade I listed building.

== Notable residents ==
Sydney Smith was rector of the parish of Combe Florey from 1829 until his death in 1845. Combe Florey House was the home of the novelist Evelyn Waugh, and later of his son, Auberon. Auberon Waugh is buried in St Peter and Paul's churchyard. Evelyn Waugh is buried in a private plot of land next to the churchyard. The writers Daisy Waugh and Alexander Waugh both grew up at Combe Florey House, but their mother, Auberon Waugh's widow, sold the house in 2008.

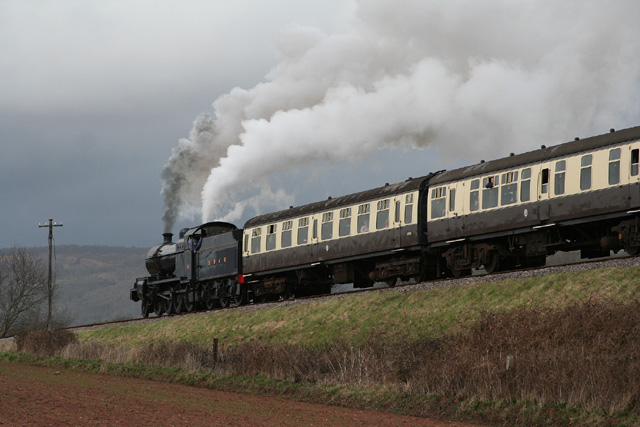
West Somerset Railway

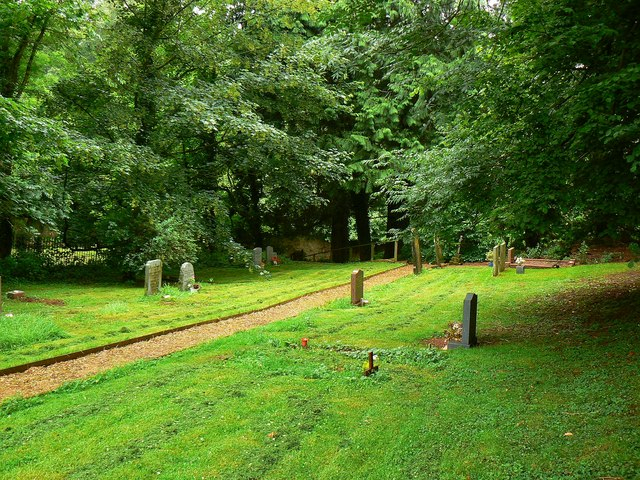
Cemetery

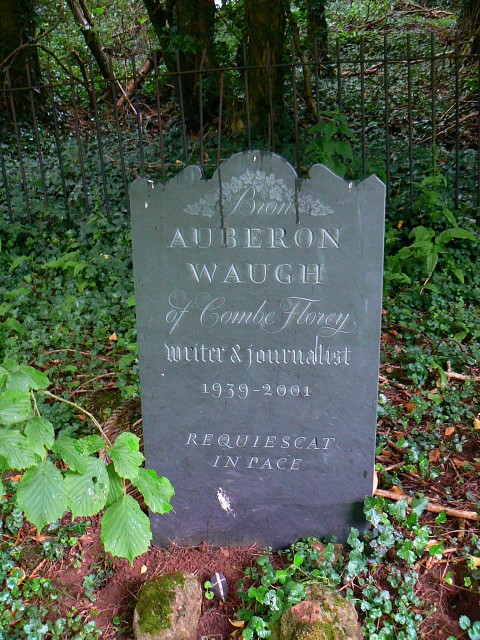
Auberon Waugh's grave

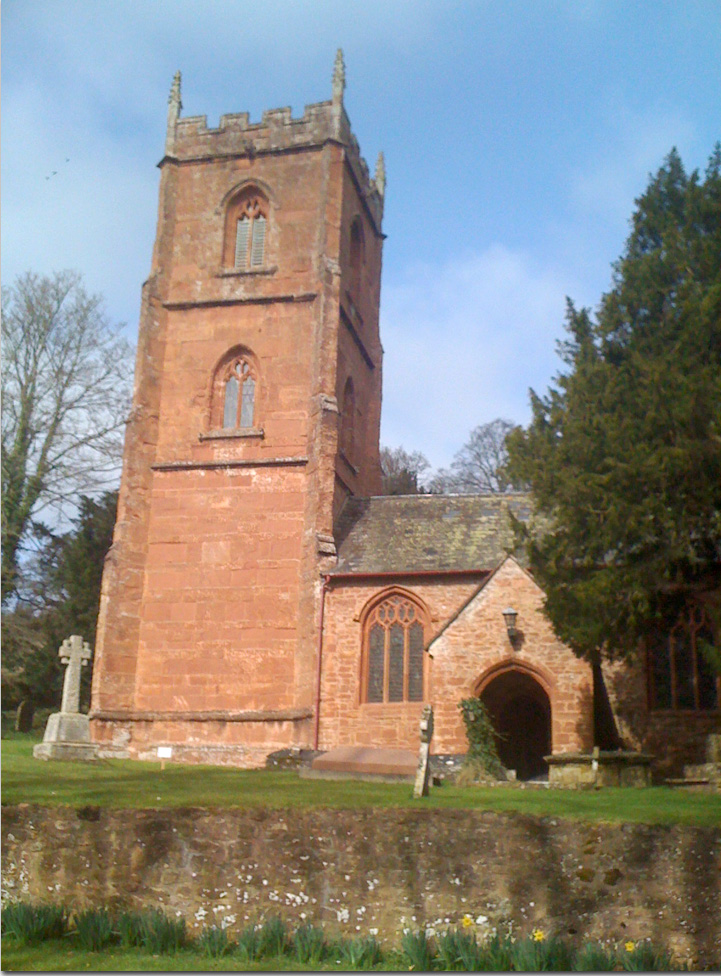
Church of St Peter and St Paul
