= Stroud and District Combination Senior Cup =

- Sport: Rugby Union
- Instituted: 1974; 52 years ago
- Number of teams: 4
- Country: England
- Holders: Dursley (6th title) (2017-18)
- Most titles: Cirencester (19 titles)
- Website: Gloucestershire RFU

The Stroud and District Combination Senior Cup is an annual rugby union knock-out club competition organized by the Stroud and District Combination - one of the five bodies that make up the Gloucestershire Rugby Football Union. It was first introduced during the 1974-75 season, with the inaugural winners being the Royal Agricultural College and is the most important rugby union competition in Stroud District, ahead of the Junior Cup and Bill Adams Cup. With only 9 member clubs the combination is one of the smallest in Gloucestershire.

The Senior Cup is currently open to club sides based in Stroud District which can range between tier 7 (Tribute Western Counties North) all the way down to tier 11 (Gloucester 3). The format is a knockout cup with semi-finals followed by a final to be held at a neutral ground in the region between March-May.

== Stroud and District Combination Senior Cup winners ==
Stroud and District Combination Senior Cup Finals
| Season | Winner | Score | Runners–up | Venue | |
| 1974-75 | Royal Agricultural College | | | | |
| 1975-76 | Painswick | | | | |
| 1976-77 | Painswick | 16-0 | Dursley | Fromehall Park, Stroud, Gloucestershire | |
| 1977-78 | Painswick | | | | |
| 1978-79 | Royal Agricultural College | | | | |
| 1979-80 | Cirencester | | | | |
| 1980-81 | Stroud | | | | |
| 1981-82 | Dursley | | | | |
| 1982-83 | Stroud III | | | | |
| 1983-84 | Cirencester | | | | |
| 1984-85 | Cirencester | | | | |
| 1985-86 | Stroud II | | | | |
| 1986-87 | Cirencester | | | | |
| 1987-88 | Cirencester | | | | |
| 1988-89 | Cirencester | | | | |
| 1989-90 | Cirencester | | | | |
| 1990-91 | Painswick | | | | |
| 1991-92 | Cirencester | | | | |
| 1992-93 | Painswick | | | | |
| 1993-94 | Painswick | | | | |
| 1994-95 | Cirencester | | | | |
| 1995-96 | Painswick | | | | |
| 1996-97 | Cirencester | | | | |
| 1997-98 | Cirencester | | | | |
| 1998-99 | Tetbury | | | | |
| 1999-00 | Cirencester | | | | |
| 2000-01 | Painswick | | | | |
| 2001-02 | Painswick | | | | |
| 2002-03 | Painswick | | | | |
| 2003-04 | Painswick | | | | |
| 2004-05 | Cirencester | | | | |
| 2005-06 | Cirencester | 15-5 | Dursley | Fromehall Park, Stroud, Gloucestershire | |
| 2006-07 | Stroud | | Cirencester | | |
| 2007-08 | Cirencester | 69-10 | Fairford | Fromehall Park, Stroud, Gloucestershire | |
| 2008-09 | Stroud | 23-10 | Dursley | The Whiteway, Cirencester, Gloucestershire | |
| 2009-10 | Cirencester | 48-12 | Painswick | Fromehall Park, Stroud, Gloucestershire | |
| 2010-11 | Dursley | 18-14 | Cirencester | | |
| 2011-12 | Cirencester | 25-20 | Dursley | Fromehall Park, Stroud, Gloucestershire | |
| 2012-13 | Cirencester | | | Hounds Green, Stinchcombe, Gloucestershire | |
| 2013-14 | Cirencester | 15-7 | Painswick | Hounds Green, Stinchcombe, Gloucestershire | |
| 2014-15 | Dursley | 26-15 | Stroud | The Whiteway, Cirencester, Gloucestershire | |
| 2015-16 | Dursley | 14-10 | Cirencester | Broadham Fields, Painswick, Gloucestershire | |
| 2016-17 | Dursley | 38-0 | Cirencester | Fromehall Park, Stroud, Gloucestershire | |
| 2017-18 | Dursley | 15-12 | Cirencester | The Whiteway, Cirencester, Gloucestershire | |
| 2018-19 | Dursley | 44-22 | Cirencester | Broadham Fields, Painswick, Gloucestershire | |
| 2019-20 | Dursley | | | Cancelled COVID-19 | |
| 2020-21 | Dursley | | | Cancelled COVID-19 | |
| 2021-22 | Dursley | 48-14 | Stroud | The Whiteway, Cirencester, Gloucestershire | |
| 2022-23 | Dursley | 33-17 | Stroud | Fromehall Park, Stroud, Gloucestershire | 2025 |

== Number of wins ==
- Cirencester (19)
- Painswick (11)
- Dursley (6)
- Stroud (3)
- Royal Agricultural College (2)
- Stroud II (1)
- Stroud III (1)
- Tetbury (1)

== See also ==
- Gloucestershire RFU
- Stroud & District Combination Junior Cup
- Stroud & District Combination Bill Adams Cup
- English rugby union system
- Rugby union in England
