= Daisy Waugh =

English novelist and journalist (born 1967)

- Born: 19 February 1967 (age 59); England
- Occupations: Novelist and journalist
- Spouse: Peter de Sales la Terrière (m. 1995)
- Children: 2
- Parent(s): Auberon Waugh and Lady Teresa Waugh
- Relatives: Alexander Waugh (brother); Evelyn Waugh (grandfather); Arthur Waugh (great-grandfather)

Daisy Louisa Dominica Waugh (born 19 February 1967) is an English novelist and journalist.

== Early life ==
A member of a literary dynasty, Waugh is the second daughter of the writer and journalist Auberon Waugh, by his marriage in 1961 to the novelist and translator Lady Teresa Waugh, daughter of the 6th Earl of Onslow. Her brother, Alexander Waugh, was a writer. They are grandchildren of the author Evelyn Waugh and great-grandchildren of the publisher and literary critic Arthur Waugh.

Waugh grew up from the age of four at Combe Florey House, in Somerset, of which she has written: "It's an impressive-looking place: big and quite grand and pleasingly symmetrical, set at the top of a long, winding drive, with an Elizabethan gatehouse at the bottom and a small lake with a private island halfway up... With forbidden attics and vast cellars chock-a-block with hidden treasures, there was never any need for a nursery... My memories are of a house, underheated (to put it mildly), but always full of noisy cousins and glamorous, clever people, eating well and talking quickly."

== Career ==
At the age of 21, she published her first book, What Is the Matter with Mary Jane? (1988). She pursued an ambition to become a Hollywood screenwriter, which turned into a weekly newspaper column from Los Angeles, California. Her other journalism includes working as a restaurant critic and as an agony aunt for The Independent, and travel writing.

On television, she has presented Channel 4's Travelog show and was a contributor to the BBC Radio Four programme Afternoon Shift.

A Small Town in Africa (1994), a book about Waugh's experiences while living for six months at Isiolo in the Eastern Province of Kenya, was well received. In 1995, she spent three months travelling in the United States with Samantha Weinberg.

In 2005, the Literary Review described Waugh's novel Bed of Roses as "Cold Comfort Farm meets Goodbye, Mr Chips".

From about 2005 to 2007, Waugh lived in the country and wrote an anonymous column for The Sunday Times called "Country/City Mole in Home". This phase came to an end when she gave up the rural idyll and returned to London to write The Desperate Diary of a Country Housewife (2008).

Waugh has published several novels, as well as works of non-fiction, and has written for British national newspapers including The Daily Telegraph, The Times, and The Sunday Times.

== Family ==
Waugh married Peter de Sales la Terrière in 1995. Their first child, a daughter, was born on 22 September 1997, a son three years later, and a second daughter in 2006. She lives in London with her husband and children.

== Books ==
- What is the Matter with Mary Jane? A Cautionary Tale (London, 1988)
- A Small Town in Africa (London: Heinemann, 1994)
- The New You Survival Kit: An Essential Guide to Etiquette, Rites and Customs among the Modern Elite (London: HarperCollins, 2002)
- Ten Steps to Happiness (In a Safe and Healthy World) (London: HarperCollins, 2003, ISBN 0-00-711905-4)
- Bed of Roses (2005)
- Bordeaux Housewives (London: Harper, 2006)
- The Desperate Diary of a Country Housewife (London: HarperCollins, 2008, ISBN 978-0-00-726523-7)
- Last Dance with Valentino (London: HarperCollins, 2011 ISBN 0-00-727573-0)
- Melting the Snow on Hester Street (London: HarperCollins, 2013, ISBN 0-00-750890-5
- The Kids Will Be Fine: Guilt-Free Motherhood for Thoroughly Modern Women (Metropolitan, 2014)
- In the Crypt with a Candlestick (Piatkus, 2020)
- Old School Ties (Hachette, 2024)
