= Kenneth Littlejohn =

British armed robber

Kenneth Littlejohn (a.k.a. Kenneth Austen; born c. 1941) is a convicted armed robber and gaol-breaker who claimed to be a Secret Intelligence Service/Official IRA double agent. The Littlejohn affair concerned allegations of British espionage and use of agents provocateurs in the Republic of Ireland during the Troubles.

== Beginnings ==
Littlejohn had been dishonourably discharged from the Parachute Regiment. He served three years for robbery before being released from prison in 1968 from which time he worked as a car dealer. In 1970 the Midland Motor Cylinder Company in Smethwick, Birmingham was robbed of £38,000. The wages clerk, Brian Perks, claimed to have been overpowered by an Indian man who then took the money. Perks was Littlejohn's brother-in-law and the police suspected a staged incident involving the two men.

Littlejohn claims he went on the run, first to London, where he made contact with a police officer who showed him his arrest warrant and advised him to move to Dublin. In December 1970, in Dublin, he set up a company, Whizz Kids (Ireland) Ltd. He moved to Cahersiveen, County Kerry seeking a potential development site for a factory. As a flash potential investor who bought drinks for all in the local pubs, he became well known and popular in the area. Littlejohn claimed he was shown a Kalashnikov supposedly smuggled in by Russian sailors. He turned down several potential development sites and left unpaid debts when he returned to Dublin.

== The British Government and the Official IRA ==
Pamela, Lady Onslow was an aristocratic divorcee who occupied part of her time with the ex-Borstal organisation "Teamwork Associates" in London. Littlejohn's brother, Keith, had spent time in Borstal and was known to Lady Onslow through the organisation. Lady Onslow was made aware of information in Littlejohn's possession and contacted her friend, Lord Carrington. On 22 November 1971, a meeting was arranged at Onslow's London flat between Littlejohn and British minister Geoffrey Johnson Smith. It was at this time that the official Wanted status in respect of the Smethwick robbery was downgraded to Desired to Interview. In 1975, Lady Onslow received minor injuries when she opened a letter bomb which failed to detonate properly.

The Littlejohn brothers moved to the Rostrevor estate near Newry in early 1972 and began frequenting pubs in Newry and across the border in Dundalk where they moved in Republican circles. The Official IRA would later state that, although the brothers were known to them, they were never members. The Times claimed that, in fact, they did join the Officials but were dismissed in August 1972 when suspected of robberies in Newry for their own personal gain.

On 18 September 1972, Edmund Woolsey, a 32-year old Catholic man, was killed in South Armagh by a booby trap attached to his car, while two of his friends were injured. The car had been stolen a week earlier, and the RUC informed Woolsey that the car had been found abandoned at Glasdrumman, near Crossmaglen, County Armagh. The bomb exploded as Woolsey went to retrieve his vehicle. While not a member of the Official Irish Republican Army (OIRA), Woolsey was known to the OIRA and socialised in similar circles, something which Littlejohn knew. At the time, the OIRA suspected that Littlejohn had planted the bomb to kill Woolsey, who he suspected was a member of their organisation.

== Bank robbery and trial ==
In October 1972 the Allied Irish Banks branch in Grafton Street, Dublin, was robbed of £67,000; at the time the largest haul in Ireland. Three men had turned up at the home of the manager, who was then driven to the bank while his family was held hostage. A further three gang members locked the staff in the vault before escaping with the money. The Ulster Volunteer Force was initially reported as responsible following comments made by the robbers.

The Littlejohn brothers were arrested in London the week following the issuance of an extradition warrant from Dublin. Following an instruction from the Attorney General, the extradition proceedings were held in camera on the grounds of national security.

At the extradition proceedings the brothers tried but failed to prevent a prosecution by the Special Criminal Court under the Offences against the State Acts 1939. The Irish Attorney General had given assurances that they would not be charged with political offences under the Act. In Irish law there was no mechanism for a non-political case, such as robbery, to be held in camera. Thus they were tried in open court despite the British Government lobbying of the Irish Government.

The Littlejohns were found guilty of bank robbery on 3 August 1973 and sentenced to imprisonment; Kenneth received 20 years and Keith 15 years. The brothers escaped from Dublin's Mountjoy Prison in March 1974. Toothpaste had been used to cover up saw marks in the cream coloured bars of the cell window. Having escaped the wing the brothers got over the wall using planks being used for building work.

== Thomas Watt ==
Littlejohn escaped from Mountjoy Prison in March 1974 and returned to England, where he was harboured in the Birmingham home of Thomas Watt, a future prosecution witness in the Birmingham Six Trial. While on the run Littlejohn gave several press interviews and enrolled for touch-typing lessons to help him write his memoirs. Littlejohn was staying with Watt on the night, in November 1974, of the Birmingham pub bombings, and made tea when detectives came to interview Watt.

Littlejohn was recaptured, in his underpants at gunpoint, by West Midlands Police detectives at Watt's home on 11 December 1974. Watt himself was arrested later that afternoon, but claimed he was released, on Detective Superintendent Pat Cooney's orders, as he could not be prosecuted as Littlejohn's crime was committed outside of the UK. The brothers were released early in 1981 on condition they leave the Republic of Ireland. The following year Nottingham Crown Court jailed Littlejohn for six years for his part in a £1,300, armed robbery at the Old Manor House, North Wingfield, Chesterfield, England, however Keith Littlejohn was cleared of a similar offence.
