= Cirencester RFC =

English rugby union club

(England) Cirencester
- Full name: Cirencester Rugby Football Club
- Union: Gloucestershire RFU
- Founded: 1949; 76 years ago
- Location: Cirencester, Gloucestershire, England
- Ground(s): The Whiteway
- Chairman: Tim Thompson
- President: Nick Theakston
- Coach(es): Andrew Deacon
- Captain(s): James Fisher
- League(s): Gloucester 1
- 2019–20: 6th

Official website
- www.crfc.co.uk

Cirencester Rugby Football Club is an English rugby union club based in Cirencester, Gloucestershire. The club runs three senior teams, along with a full mini and youth section running from under-7's up to colts. The first XV play in the Gloucester 1, a level nine league in the English rugby union system following their relegation at the end of the 2017–18 season, the second XV play in Gloucester and District Reserve League 2, while the third XV play in Gloucester and District Reserve League 3.

== Honours ==
1st team:

- Stroud & District Combination Senior Cup winners (19): 1979–80, 1983–84, 1984–85, 1986–87, 1987–88, 1988–89, 1989–90, 1991–92, 1994–95, 1996–97, 1997–98, 1999–00, 2004–05, 2005–06, 2007–08, 200910, 2011–12, 2012–13, 2013–14
- Gloucester Premier v Somerset Premier play-off winners (2): 2009–10, 2015–16
- GRFU Level 8 County Cup champions: 2015–16
- Gloucester v Somerset (level 8) promotion play-off winner: 2015–16

2nd team:

- Stroud & District Combination Junior Cup winners (9): 1981–82, 1982–83, 1985–86, 1989–90, 1996–97, 2001–02, 2008–09, 2011–12, 2014–15
- Stroud & District Combination Junior Plate winners (2): 2009–10, 2015–16

3rd team:

- Stroud & District Combination Bill Adams Cup winners (14): 1983–84, 1988–89, 1991–92, 1996–97, 1998–99, 2002–03, 2005–06, 2006–07, 2007–08, 2009–10, 2010–11, 2011–12, 2012–13, 2013–14
