= Benedetta Craveri =

Italian literary critic, academic and writer

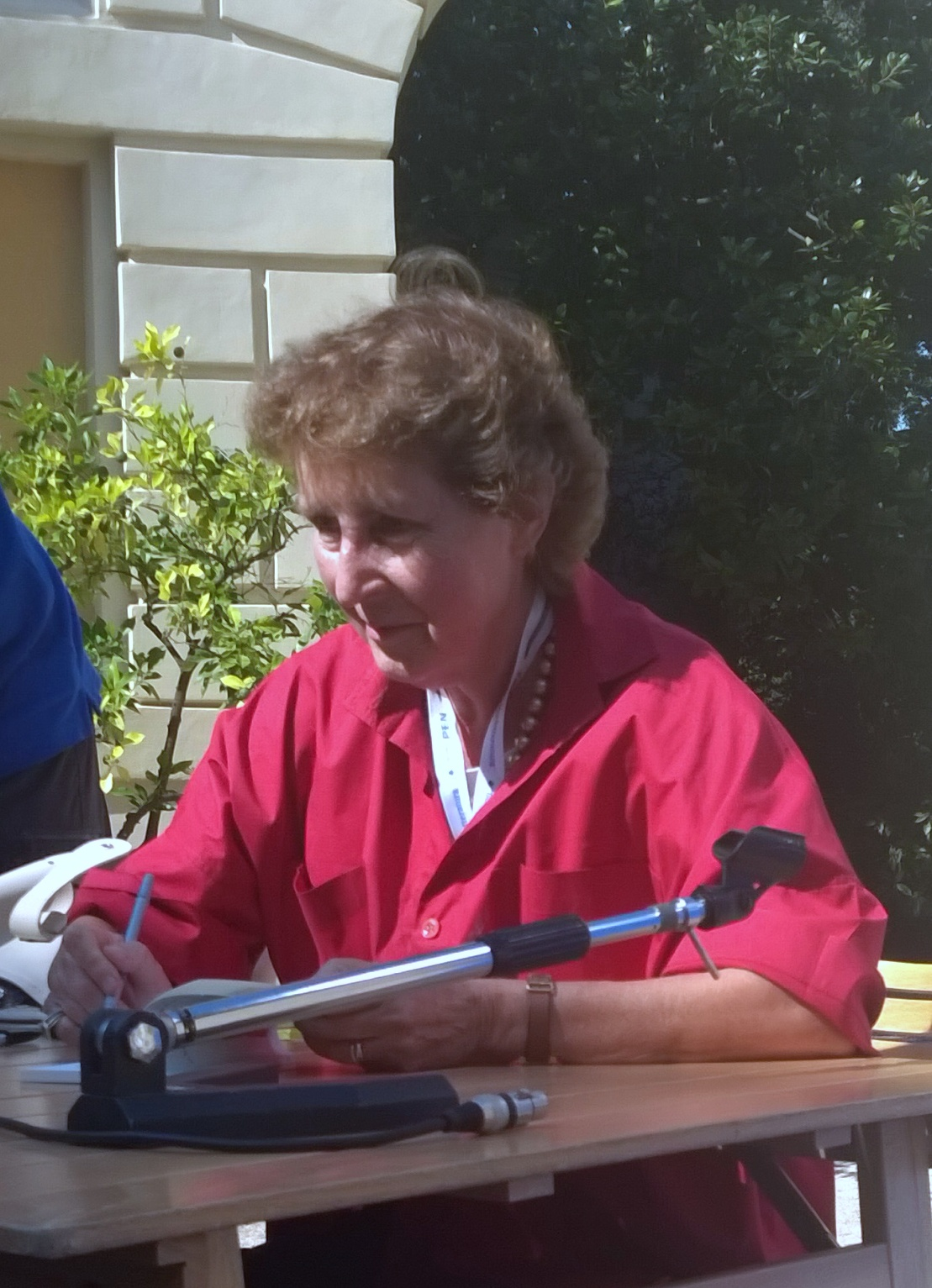
Benedetta Craveri

Adele Benedetta Craveri (born 23 September 1942) is an Italian literary critic, academic and writer.

She was born in Rome, the daughter of the historian and political activist Raimondo Craveri and the writer and translator Elena Croce (herself the daughter of the philosopher Benedetto Croce). She studied literature at the University of Rome, graduating in 1969, and went on to teach at Tuscia University in Viterbo. Since 2005 she has taught at the Suor Orsola Benincasa University of Naples.

Her book, Madame du Deffand e il suo mondo (1982) was translated into English by Teresa Waugh; the English version was first published in the United States. A New York Times critic described Craveri's writing as having "the subtlety of a novelist and the precision of a scholar" and the book as "a work of stunning originality".

Craveri's first husband was the critic and writer Masolino D'Amico, by whom she had two daughters, one of whom, Margherita, is a well-known writer and activist. Following her divorce from D'Amico, she married a French diplomat, Benoît d'Aboville. The couple lived for a time in Brussels as a result of his diplomatic duties.

Craveri is a member of the Istituto dell'Enciclopedia Italiana. From 1976 until 1986 she produced the cultural review Spazio 3 on Italy's Rai Radio 3.

In 2017, Craveri was awarded the Prix mondial Cino Del Duca, which recognises an author whose work constitutes, in a scientific or literary form, a message of modern humanism.

== Selected works ==
- Vita privata del maresciallo di Richelieu (1989)
- La civiltà della conversazione (2001)
- Amanti e regine. Il potere delle donne (2005)
- Maria Antonietta e lo scandalo della collana (2006)
- Gli ultimi libertini (2016) (translated into English as The Last Libertines New York Review Books (2020))
