= William Onslow, 6th Earl of Onslow =

British peer, army officer, and politician (1913–1971)

The Right Honourable The Earl of Onslow KBE MC CStJ TD DL

Deputy Chief Whip of the House of Lords Captain of the Yeomen of the Guard
- In office November 1951 – October 1960
- Prime Minister: Winston Churchill; Anthony Eden; Harold Macmillan
- Preceded by: The Lord Archibald
- Succeeded by: The Lord Newton

Member of the House of Lords Lord Temporal
- In office 10 June 1945 – 3 June 1971; Hereditary peerage
- Preceded by: The 5th Earl of Onslow
- Succeeded by: The 7th Earl of Onslow

Personal details
- Born: 11 June 1913
- Died: 3 June 1971 (aged 57)
- Party: Conservative; Liberal
- Spouse(s): Pamela Dillon (m. 1936; div. 1962) Nina Sturdee
- Children: Michael Onslow, 7th Earl of Onslow; Lady Teresa Waugh
- Parent(s): Richard Onslow, 5th Earl of Onslow; Violet Bampfylde
- Education: Winchester College; Royal Military College, Sandhurst

William Arthur Bampfylde Onslow, 6th Earl of Onslow, KBE, MC, CStJ, TD, DL (11 June 1913 – 3 June 1971), known as Viscount Cranley until 1945, was a British peer, politician and army officer.

Onslow was the eldest son of Richard William Alan Onslow, 5th Earl of Onslow and Violet Marcia Catherine Warwick Bampfylde, daughter of Coplestone Bampfylde, 3rd Baron Poltimore, and was educated at Winchester College and the Royal Military College, Sandhurst.

== Military career ==
From Sandhurst Onslow was commissioned as a second lieutenant into the Life Guards in 1934, and promoted to lieutenant in 1938. During the Second World War he transferred to 4th County of London Yeomanry, winning the Military Cross as a captain and temporary major for his actions on 19 and 23 November during Operation Crusader in the Western Desert. The citation describes how on 19 November he continued fighting his tank after it had been immobilised, and on 23 November, led two troops of tanks into battle standing on his scout car waving the tanks on with his handkerchief; the award was gazetted on 12 February 1942. As an acting lieutenant-colonel, he commanded the regiment in the Battle of Villers-Bocage during the Normandy Campaign in 1944. His unit was attacked by Michael Wittmann of the Waffen SS who attacked with six tanks. He was subsequently captured by the Germans and was a prisoner of war until the end of the war. In 1961 he published an account of his war service, Men and Sand.

== Politics ==
Politically, Onslow was a Conservative and was co-opted to the London County Council to represent Putney in 1940. He held the seat at the council election in 1946, remaining a member of the body until 1949. From 1949 to 1952 he was a member of Surrey County Council.

In 1945 he succeeded to his father's titles, and a place in the House of Lords, and was Assistant Chief Conservative Whip in the house from 1951 to 1960. He subsequently left the party, joining the Liberals in 1965.

Lord Onslow was appointed a Commander of the Venerable Order of Saint John on 8 July 1947, and Knight Commander of the Order of the British Empire on 31 October 1960. He was also a Deputy Lieutenant of Surrey, resigning on 13 April 1962.

== Territorial Army ==
Onslow continued in part-time service with the Territorial Army after the war, now with 3rd/4th County of London Yeomanry (Sharpshooters), and was promoted to substantive lieutenant-colonel on 1 May 1947. He was promoted brevet colonel on 21 March 1950, awarded the Territorial Efficiency Decoration on 21 April 1950, and transferred to the Territorial Army Reserve of Officers on 4 July 1951. He was appointed Captain of the Yeomen of the Guard on 5 November 1951, and Honorary Colonel of 3rd/4th County of London Yeomanry (Sharpshooters) on 21 June 1956. As Captain of the Yeomen of the Guard he took part in the funeral of King George VI, and the coronation of Queen Elizabeth II.

== Family ==
On 4 August 1936, Onslow married Pamela Louisa Eleanor Dillon, only daughter of Eric Dillon, 19th Viscount Dillon. They had two children:

- Michael William Coplestone Dillon Onslow, 7th Earl of Onslow (born 28 February 1938, died 14 May 2011)
- Lady Teresa Lorraine Onslow (born 26 February 1940), who married the author Auberon Waugh, eldest son of Evelyn Waugh, on 1 July 1961.

Onslow divorced his wife in 1962 and remarried, to Nina Edith Jo Sturdee (who died in 2006), later that year.

He died in 1971 aged 57 and was succeeded by his only son. His grandchildren include Daisy and Alexander Waugh.

Political offices
Preceded by The Lord Archibald	Captain of the Yeomen of the Guard; 1951–1960	Succeeded by The Lord Newton
Military offices
Preceded by Sir Richard McCreery	Colonel of the 3rd/4th County of London Yeomanry; 1956–1961	Succeeded by Amalgamated with the 297 (Kent Yeomanry) Regt, Royal Artillery to form the Kent and County of London Yeomanry
Peerage of Great Britain
Preceded by Richard Onslow	Baron Cranley; 1945–1971	Succeeded by Michael Onslow
Preceded by Richard Onslow	Baron Onslow; 1945–1971	Succeeded by Michael Onslow
Peerage of the United Kingdom
Preceded by Richard Onslow	Earl of Onslow; 1945–1971; Member of the House of Lords (1945–1971)	Succeeded by Michael Onslow
