= Church of St Peter & St Paul, Combe Florey =

Church in Somerset, England

Church of St Peter & St Paul
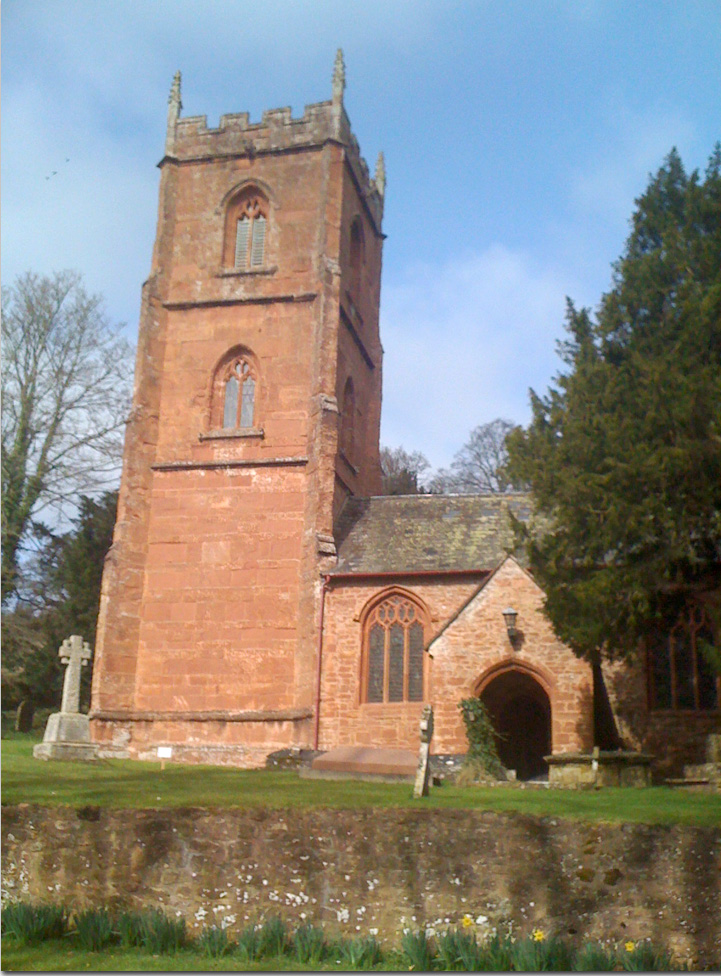
- Church of St Peter and St Paul, Combe Florey

- Location within Somerset

General information
- Location: Combe Florey, England
- Coordinates: 51.0736°N 3.2139°W
- Completed: 15th century

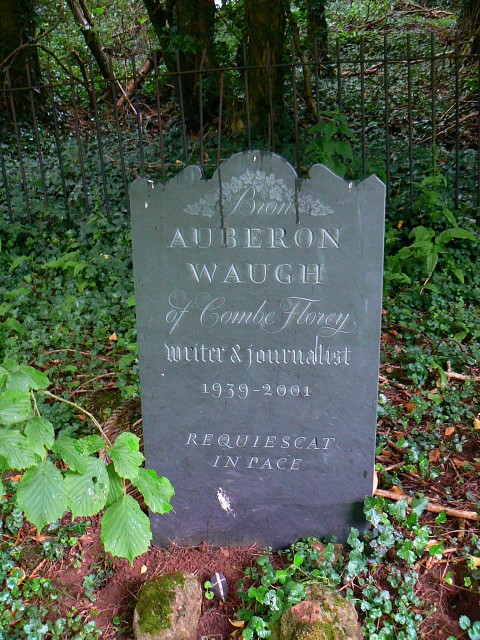
Auberon Waugh's grave

The Church of St Peter & St Paul in Combe Florey, Somerset, England has some remains from the 13th century but is mostly from the 15th century and is designated as a Grade I listed building.

The church is built of Old Red Sandstone with Hamstone around the windows and doorways. It has a three-bay nave with north aisle and west three-stage tower. The chancel is of Victorian construction. The interior includes several monuments, one of which is attributed to John Michael Rysbrack, and three stone effigies which date from the 14th century.

Sydney Smith was rector of the Church of St Peter and St Paul from 1829 until his death in 1845.

Auberon Waugh is buried in St Peter and Paul's churchyard. Evelyn Waugh is buried in a private plot of land next to the churchyard.

The Anglican parish is part of the benefice of Bishop's Lydeard with Lydeard Saint Lawrence, Bagborough, Combe Florey and Cothelstone within the Taunton archdeaconry.

== See also ==
- List of Grade I listed buildings in Taunton Deane
- List of towers in Somerset
- List of ecclesiastical parishes in the Diocese of Bath and Wells
