= Sword of Honour =

Trilogy of novels by Evelyn Waugh

- Men at Arms (1952); Officers and Gentlemen (1955); Unconditional Surrender (1961)
- Author: Evelyn Waugh
- Language: English
- Publisher: Chapman & Hall
- Published: 1952–1961

The Sword of Honour is a trilogy of novels by Evelyn Waugh which loosely parallel Waugh's experiences during the Second World War. Published by Chapman & Hall from 1952 to 1961, the novels are: Men at Arms (1952); Officers and Gentlemen (1955); and Unconditional Surrender (1961), marketed as The End of the Battle in the United States and Canada.

Waugh received the James Tait Black Memorial Prize for Men at Arms in 1952.

The dust jackets for the books were designed by the popular illustrator Val Biro.

== Plot summary ==
The protagonist is Guy Crouchback, heir of a declining aristocratic English Roman Catholic family. Guy has spent his thirties at the family villa in Italy shunning the world after the failure of his marriage and has decided to return to England at the very beginning of the Second World War, in the belief that the creeping evils of modernity, becoming apparent in the Soviet Union and Nazi Germany, have become all too clearly displayed as a real and embodied enemy.

He attempts to join the Army, finally succeeding with the (fictitious) Royal Corps of Halberdiers, an old but not too fashionable regiment. He trains as an officer and is posted to various locations around Britain. One of the themes is recurring "flaps" or chaos – embarking and disembarking from ships and railway carriages that go nowhere. Crouchback meets the fire-eating Brigadier Ben Ritchie-Hook (probably based on Lieutenant General Sir Adrian Carton de Wiart, a college friend of Waugh's father-in-law whom Waugh knew somewhat from his club), and Apthorpe, a very eccentric fellow officer; in an episode of high farce, the latter two have a battle of wits and military discipline over an Edwardian thunder-box (portable toilet) which Crouchback observes, amused and detached. Before being sent on active service, he attempts to seduce his ex-wife Virginia, secure in the knowledge that the Catholic Church still regards her as his wife; she refuses him.

He and Ben Ritchie-Hook share an adventure during the Battle of Dakar in 1940. Apthorpe dies in Freetown, supposedly of a tropical disease; when it is discovered that Guy gave him a bottle of whisky when visiting him in the hospital (there is an implication that Apthorpe's disease, unknown to Guy, was really alcoholic liver failure), Guy is sent home, having blotted his copybook. Thus ends the first book.

Crouchback eventually finds a place in a fledgling commando brigade training on a Scottish island under an old friend, Tommy Blackhouse, for whom Virginia left him. Another trainee is Ivor Claire, whom Crouchback regards as the flower of English chivalry. He learns to exploit the niceties of military ways of doing things from Colonel "Jumbo" Trotter, an elderly Halberdier who knows all the strings to pull. Crouchback is posted to Egypt, headquarters for the Middle East theatre of operations. This involves him in the Battle of Crete, where he meets the disquieting Corporal-Major Ludovic. Crouchback acquits himself well on Crete, though chaos and muddle prevail. He, Ludovic and a few others achieve a perilous escape from the advancing Germans in a small boat. Ludovic wades ashore in Egypt, carrying Guy; the others in the boat have disappeared. Apparently a hero, Ludovic is made an officer. In Egypt, the beautiful and well-connected Mrs Stitch, a character who also figures in other Waugh novels, takes Guy under her wing. She also endeavours to protect Claire, who was evacuated from Crete even though his unit's orders were to fight to the last and then surrender as prisoners of war. She arranges for Crouchback to be sent the long way home to England, possibly to prevent him from compromising the cover story worked up to protect Claire from desertion charges. Guy finds himself once more in his club, asking around for a suitable job. Thus ends the second book.

Crouchback spends 1941–1943 in Britain, mostly at desk jobs. He turns 40 and, with Germany's invasion of the Soviet Union and Britain's subsequent alliance with the Soviets, feels a sense of the war's futility. American soldiers swarm around London. Virginia has fallen on hard times and is reduced to selling her furs. She had been persuaded to accompany Trimmer, her former hairdresser, who has been set up as a war hero for propaganda purposes. She becomes pregnant by him and searches futilely for an abortion provider. Eventually, she decides to look for a husband instead. Crouchback is selected for parachute training, preparatory to being sent into action one last time. The commanding officer at the training centre is Ludovic. In Crete, Ludovic had deserted from his unit, and in the process murdered two men, one on the boat. Although Crouchback was delirious at the time, Ludovic is afraid that he will be exposed if Guy meets him. Already a misfit as an officer, he becomes increasingly paranoid and isolated.

Guy is injured during the parachute training, and finds himself stuck in an RAF medical unit, cut off from anyone he knows. He eventually contacts Jumbo Trotter to extract him and returns to live with his elderly bachelor uncle Peregrine Crouchback. His father having died and left behind a significant estate, Guy is now able to support himself comfortably. This attracts the attention of Virginia, who begins to visit him.

Before Guy goes abroad, he and Virginia are reconciled and remarry (i.e., simply resuming their marriage, in the eyes of the Catholic Church). Virginia stays in London with Guy's Uncle Peregrine and has her baby there. Despite being incorrectly suspected of pro-Axis sympathies because of his time in pre-war Italy and of his Catholicism, Guy is posted to Yugoslavia. He is appalled by the partisans, befriends a small group of Jews, and finds out that his former friend de Souza's loyalties are with the Communists rather than with Britain. While Guy is overseas, a German doodlebug hits Uncle Peregrine's flat and kills him and Virginia, but not the infant son of Virginia and Trimmer, Gervase, who is in the country with Guy's sister.

On his late father's advice, Guy attempts individual acts of salvation, but these ultimately make matters worse for the recipients. The Yugoslavian Jews receive gifts from Jewish organisations in the US, infuriating non-Jewish locals, although the gifts consist largely of warm clothing and food. Upon returning to England, Guy is told that some of his friends in Yugoslavia were shot as spies, largely because they had become so friendly with him.

After the end of the war Guy meets the daughter of another old Roman Catholic family, Domenica Plessington, and marries her. In Waugh's first version of the novel's conclusion, Guy and his second wife produce further children who are to be disinherited by Trimmer's son. Waugh altered this ending to an uncompromisingly childless marriage in the revised text, after realising that some readers interpreted such a conclusion as hopeful. "No nippers for Guy," he clarified in a letter to Nancy Mitford. Even so, although Waugh died in 1966, in the Penguin 1974 reprint Guy still has two sons with Domenica Plessington.

== Themes ==
The novels have obvious echoes in Evelyn Waugh's wartime career; his participation in the Dakar expedition, his stint with the commandos, his time in Crete and his role in Yugoslavia. Unlike Crouchback, Waugh was not a cradle Roman Catholic but a convert from the upper middle class – although Waugh clearly believed that the recusant experience was vital in the development of English Roman Catholicism.

The novel is the most thorough treatment of the theme of Waugh's writing, first fully displayed in Brideshead Revisited: a celebration of the virtues of tradition, of family and feudal loyalty, of paternalist hierarchy, of the continuity of institutions and of the heroic ideal and the calamitous disappearance of these which has led to the emptiness and futility of the modern world.

== Appreciation ==
The three novels paint an ironic picture of regimental life in the British Army and are a satire on the wasteful and perverse bureaucracy of modern warfare. Guy's Roman Catholicism and Italian experience combine with his diffident personality to make him something of an outside observer in English society, and his point of view enables Waugh to push the satire hard and remain in voice.

Underneath the comedy, the theme emerges ever more strongly. Guy Crouchback is a quintessentially English figure, with his instinctive understanding of his culture, his hesitancy, courtesy, and reluctance to make a scene. The novels reveal his discovery that the romantic worship of tradition and heroism – the aristocratic mind-set which has supported him all his life – does not work in the modern world.

This is made explicit in the episode after which the trilogy is named, at the beginning of the third and final book. A splendid ceremonial sword, the "Sword of Stalingrad" is made "at the King's command", to be presented to the Soviet Union in recognition of the sacrifices that the Soviet people have made in the war against the Nazis (in reality, this was the jewelled sword commemorating the Battle of Stalingrad, commissioned by George VI). Before being sent to Moscow, it is put on display to the British public in Westminster Abbey; long queues of people "suffused with gratitude to their remote allies" come to worship it. Guy Crouchback is unmoved and chooses not to visit, as he is distinctly not impressed by Joseph Stalin: "he was not tempted to join them in their piety". Instead he goes for a surfeit of luxurious food for lunch on his 40th birthday and dwells neither on the past nor the future.

Waugh also contrasts the sword, symbol for him of the betrayal of eastern Europe to the atheist Stalin, with the sword of honour of a crusading ancestor of Guy Crouchback, who is described near the beginning of the first book.

It is a resigned rather than an idealistic Crouchback who goes to Yugoslavia, and it is made clear that the future belongs not to idealism but to the cynical Trimmer and the empty American Padfield. The reader is left unsure whether Guy Crouchback is powerless to resist the world's decline from a Golden Age of chivalry, or whether the Golden Age was a romantic illusion.

== Dramatisations ==
There have been five dramatisations of Sword of Honour for television and radio:

- 1967 BBC television version made as part of Theatre 625 was written by Giles Cooper. It starred Edward Woodward, with James Villiers, Ronald Fraser, Freddie Jones and Vivian Pickles, and was directed by Donald McWhinnie. Waugh met Cooper at the Dorchester Hotel early in 1966 before the latter started work on the script. They had both attended Lancing College, a fact which came to light at the meeting, but despite an age difference of some fifteen years, neither lived to see the work broadcast the following year. The series was once available as a digital download, but the website has since been shut down, leaving it unavailable for public viewing.
- 1970 Radio 4 series narrated by Huw Burden.
- 1974 radio version written by Barry Campbell with Hugh Dickson, Norman Rodway, Carleton Hobbs and Patrick Troughton
- 2001 TV film starring Daniel Craig
- 2013 radio version written by Jeremy Front, with Paul Ready as Guy Crouchback, and Tim Pigott-Smith as Ritchie-Hook.
