= Eric Dillon, 19th Viscount Dillon =

Irish peer and British Army officer

Brigadier The Right Honourable The Viscount Dillon CMG DSO
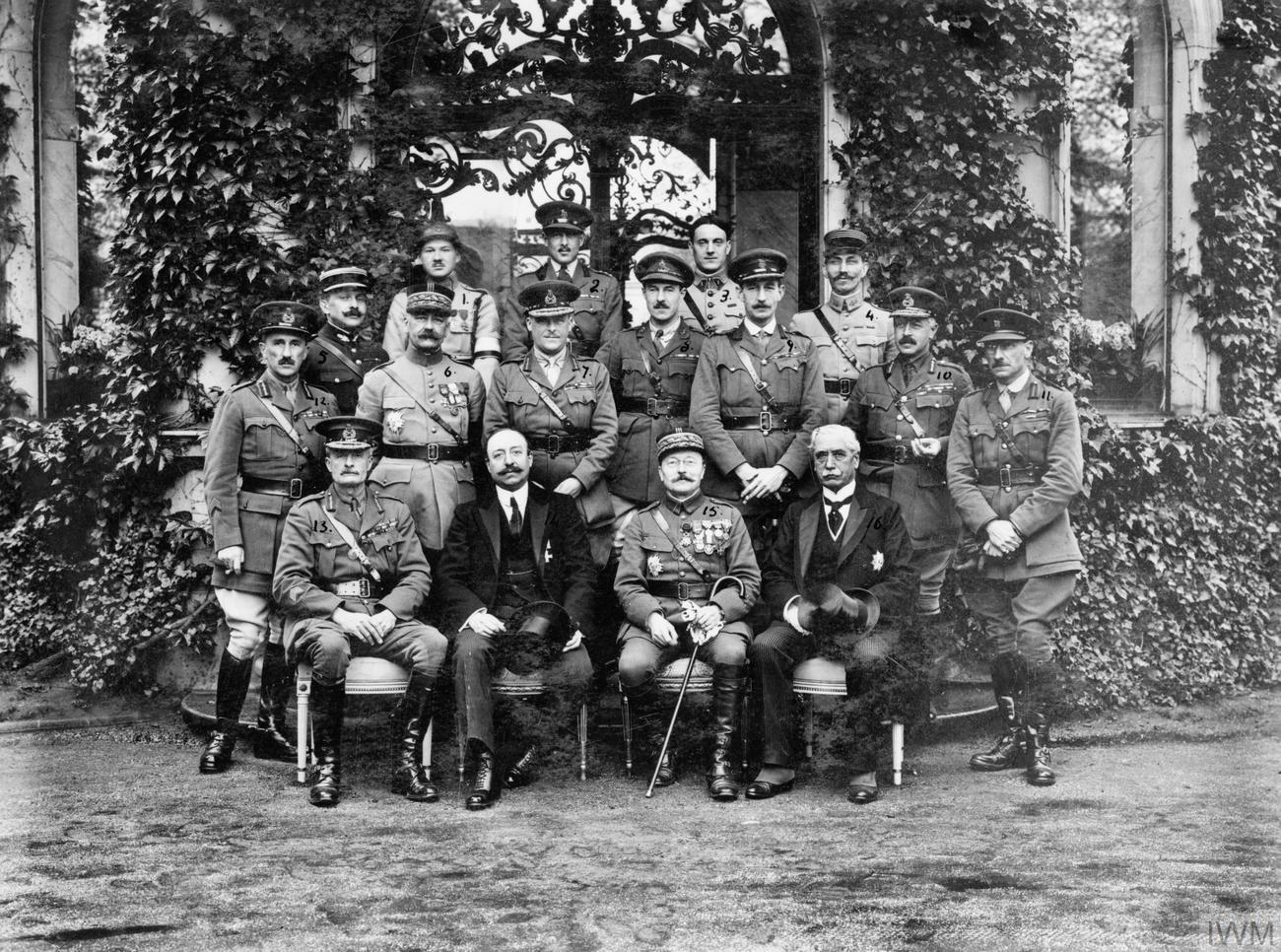
- Dillon (centre-right, labeled "9" on photograph) during allied occupation of Germany, 1919
- Born: Eric FitzGerald Dillon; 4 April 1881
- Died: 6 April 1946 (aged 65)

Brigadier Eric FitzGerald Dillon, 19th Viscount Dillon, CMG, DSO (4 April 1881 – 6 April 1946) was an Irish peer and British Army officer who served in World War I.

He was educated at Rugby School and won the DSO, Legion of Honour, CMG, Croix de Guerre, Belgian Croix de Guerre and Order of Leopold of Belgian. He was a member of the Travellers' Club and lived at 5 Embankment Gardens Chelsea, London SW3. He and his wife, Nora Juanita Muriel (née Beckett), had two children. Their son, Michael Eric Dillon, succeeded his father as the 20th Viscount Dillon. Their daughter, Pamela Dillon, married William Onslow, 6th Earl of Onslow.

Peerage of Ireland
Preceded by Arthur Dillon	Viscount Dillon; 1934–1946	Succeeded by Michael Dillon
