= Unconditional Surrender (novel) =

1961 novel by Evelyn Waugh

- Author: Evelyn Waugh
- Language: English
- Series: Sword of Honour
- Genre: War, satire
- Publisher: Chapman & Hall
- Publication date: 1961
- Pages: 311
- Preceded by: Officers and Gentlemen

Unconditional Surrender is a 1961 novel by the British novelist Evelyn Waugh. The novel has also been published under the title The End of the Battle. Along with the other two novels in the series, it was adapted into a 2001 TV film with Daniel Craig.

== Sword of Honour ==
Unconditional Surrender is the third novel in Waugh's Sword of Honour series, the author's examination of the Second World War. The novels loosely parallel Waugh's wartime experiences.

The title is a reference to the Allied demand for an Unconditional Surrender of the Axis, made in the same period in which the plot is set, but which gets an ironical meaning when applied to the protagonist's tangled personal life.

== Plot summary ==
Guy Crouchback spends 1941–1943 in Britain, mostly at desk jobs. He turns 40 and, with the German invasion of Russia and Britain's subsequent alliance with the Soviet Union, feels the futility of the war. American soldiers are all over London. Virginia has fallen on hard times and is reduced to selling her furs. She had been persuaded to accompany Trimmer, her former hairdresser who was set up as a war hero for media consumption. She becomes pregnant by him and searches futilely for an abortion care provider. Eventually she decides to look for a husband instead. Crouchback is chosen for parachute training prior to being sent into action one last time. The commanding officer at the training center is Ludovic. In the previous volume, Officers and Gentlemen, Ludovic had deserted from his unit in Crete, and in the process murdered two men, one while escaping from the island by boat. Crouchback was also on board, and although he was delirious and barely aware of his surroundings, Ludovic fears exposure if the two meet. Already a misfit as an officer, Ludovic becomes increasingly paranoid and isolated.

Guy is injured during the parachute training, and finds himself stuck in an RAF medical unit, cut off from anyone he knows. He eventually contacts Jumbo Trotter to extract him and returns to live with his Uncle Peregrine. His father having died, and having left him a significant estate, Guy is now able to support himself comfortably. This attracts the attention of Virginia who begins to visit him.

Before Guy goes abroad, he and Virginia are reconciled and remarry (or, in the eyes of the Catholic Church, resume their marriage). Virginia stays in London with his elderly bachelor uncle, Peregrine Crouchback, and has her baby there. Despite being incorrectly suspected of pro-Axis sympathies because of his time in pre-war Italy and his Catholicism, Guy is posted to Yugoslavia where he is appalled by the Partisans, befriends a small group of Jews and finds out that his former friend de Souza's loyalties are with Communism rather than with England. While Guy is overseas, a German doodlebug hits Uncle Peregrine's flat and kills him and Virginia, but spares Virginia and Trimmer's son, Gervase, who is in the country with Guy's sister.

On his late father's advice, Guy attempts individual acts of salvation, but these ultimately make matters worse for the recipients. The Yugoslavian Jews receive gifts from Jewish organisations in the USA, infuriating the locals, although the gifts consist largely of warm clothes and food. After leaving Yugoslavia, Guy is told that some of his friends there have been executed as spies, largely because of their friendship with him.

After the end of the war Guy meets the daughter of another old Roman Catholic family and marries her. In Waugh's first version of the novel's conclusion, Guy and his second wife produce further children who are ironically to be disinherited by Trimmer's son. Waugh altered this ending to an uncompromisingly childless marriage in the revised text, after realising that some readers interpreted such a conclusion as hopeful. "No nippers for Guy," he clarified in a letter to Nancy Mitford. Nonetheless, Waugh died in 1966 and, in the 1974 Penguin reprint, the character has two sons with his wife Domenica Plessington.
