= Auberon Waugh =

British journalist and novelist (1939–2001)

- Born: Auberon Alexander Waugh; 17 November 1939; Dulverton, Somerset, England
- Died: 16 January 2001 (aged 61); Combe Florey, Somerset, England
- Education: Downside School
- Alma mater: Christ Church, Oxford
- Occupations: Journalist, novelist
- Spouse: Lady Teresa Onslow (m. 1961)
- Children: 4, including Alexander and Daisy Waugh
- Parent(s): Evelyn Waugh; Laura Herbert
- Relatives: Arthur Waugh (paternal grandfather); Aubrey Herbert (maternal grandfather); Alec Waugh (paternal uncle)
- Writing career
- Period: 1960–2000
- Genres: Novel, journalism

Auberon Alexander Waugh (/ˈɔːbərən ˈwɔː/ AW-bər-ən WAW; 17 November 1939 – 16 January 2001) was a British journalist and novelist, and eldest son of the novelist Evelyn Waugh. He was widely known by his nickname "Bron".

After a traditional classical education at Downside School, he was commissioned in the army during National Service, where he was badly injured in a shooting accident. He went on to study for a year at the University of Oxford.

At twenty, he launched his journalism career at the Telegraph Group, and also wrote for many other publications including Private Eye, in which he presented a profile that was half Tory grandee and half cheeky rebel. As a young man, Waugh wrote five well-received novels, but gave up fiction for fear of unfavourable comparisons with his father.

He and his wife Lady Teresa had four children and lived at Combe Florey House in Somerset, previously his father's home.

== Origins ==
Waugh was born at Pixton Park, near Dulverton in Somerset, his mother's ancestral home. He was the eldest son of the novelist Evelyn Waugh, grandson of the author and publisher Arthur Waugh and nephew of Alec Waugh. His mother was Laura Herbert, his father's second wife, a daughter of Colonel Aubrey Herbert (1880–1923) of Pixton, diplomat and traveller, a younger son of Henry Herbert, 4th Earl of Carnarvon, of Highclere Castle in Hampshire, a leading member of the Conservative Party, by his second wife Elizabeth Howard, a great-niece of Bernard Howard, 12th Duke of Norfolk, and a sister of Esmé Howard, 1st Baron Howard of Penrith, ambassador to the United States. Laura's half-uncle was George Herbert, 5th Earl of Carnarvon, the famous Egyptologist who sponsored Howard Carter who discovered King Tutankhamen's tomb, and her mother was Hon. Mary Gertrude Vesey, only child and sole heiress of John Vesey, 4th Viscount de Vesci (1844–1903).

He was named after Auberon Herbert (1922–1974), his mother's brother, a landowner and advocate of Eastern European causes after World War II, himself named after Auberon Herbert (1838–1906), a son of the 3rd Earl of Carnarvon. His nickname used by friends and family was "Bron".

== Early life ==
Born just as World War II broke out, Waugh hardly saw his father until he was five. His parents being Roman Catholics (his mother by birth and his father by conversion), he was educated at the Benedictine Downside School in Somerset and passed his Greek and Latin A-level exams at the early age of fifteen. He went on to begin a philosophy, politics, and economics degree at Christ Church, Oxford, where he held an exhibition in English. He was rusticated by the academic authorities, and never returned to the university, preferring to make an early start in journalism.

== Career ==
During his National Service, Waugh was commissioned into the Royal Horse Guards and served in Cyprus, where he was almost killed in a machine gun accident. Annoyed by a fault in the machine gun on his armoured car which he drove frequently, he seized the end of the barrel and shook it, accidentally triggering the mechanism so that the gun fired several bullets through his chest. As a result of his injuries, he lost his spleen, one lung, several ribs, and a finger, and suffered from pain and recurring infections for the rest of his life. While lying on the ground waiting for an ambulance, his troop sergeant kept him alive by providing vital first aid. He was first treated for his injuries at Nicosia General Hospital. While recuperating from the accident in Italy, he began his first novel, The Foxglove Saga.

== Journalism ==
Waugh began his career in journalism during 1960 as a cub reporter on Peterborough, the social/gossip column of The Daily Telegraph.

His early work as political columnist on The Spectator coincided with the war in Biafra, a mainly Catholic province that had tried to secede from Nigeria. Waugh strongly criticised Harold Wilson's government, especially the foreign secretary Michael Stewart, for colluding in the use of mass starvation as a political weapon. He was sacked from The Spectator in 1970, but with the support of Bernard Levin and others, he won damages for unfair dismissal in a subsequent action.

He was opposed to the reforms of the Second Vatican Council and criticised the Church that emerged from it. He was often critical of Archbishops Basil Hume and Derek Worlock.

He also wrote for the New Statesman, British Medicine and various newspapers (including the Daily Mirror, Daily Mail, Evening Standard and The Independent). From 1981 to 1990 he wrote a leader-page column for The Sunday Telegraph. In 1990 he returned to The Daily Telegraph as the successor of Michael Wharton (better known as "Peter Simple"), writing the paper's long-running Way of the World column three times a week until December 2000. In 1995 he finally ended his long association with The Spectator, but in 1996 he rejoined The Sunday Telegraph, where he remained a weekly columnist until shortly before his death.

== Private Eye ==
Waugh became known for his Private Eye diary, which ran from the early 1970s until 1985, and which he described as "specifically dedicated to telling lies". He fitted in well with the Eye, although he made clear his particular dislike of the Labour government of the 1970s. The education secretary Shirley Williams became an especial hate figure because of her support for comprehensive education. In his autobiography Will This Do?, Waugh claimed that he had broken two bottles of wine by banging them together too hard in celebration when she lost her House of Commons seat at Hertford and Stevenage in the general election of 1979.

Waugh was himself a candidate at the 1979 election, indulging another of his pet hates, that which he held towards former Liberal Leader Jeremy Thorpe, who was about to stand trial for conspiracy to murder in a scandal that Waugh had helped to expose. It was alleged that Thorpe had links to an incident in which a man called Norman Scott, who claimed to have had an affair with Thorpe, had seen his dog shot dead. Waugh stood against Thorpe for the Dog Lovers' Party in North Devon, and Thorpe obtained an injunction against the distribution of Waugh's election literature; but despite this The Spectator and The Guardian both printed it in full. Waugh polled only 79 votes, but Thorpe lost his seat.

Waugh left Private Eye in 1986 when Ian Hislop succeeded Richard Ingrams as editor.

== Waugh's views ==
Waugh tended to be identified with a defiantly anti-progressive, small-c conservatism, opposed to "do-gooders" and social progressives. After his death the left-wing journalist Polly Toynbee in The Guardian attacked him for these views. He has been called a nostalgist and a romantic, with a strong tendency towards snobbery, although his anarchistic streak ensured that he retained the admiration of a number of people whom he would have considered "progressive" or "leftish", including Francis Wheen, who vociferously disagreed with Toynbee's obituary comments.

Waugh expressed an intense dislike of poet Ezra Pound. In a Spectator column of 20 March 1976, he wrote: "Ezra Pound, as I remember, wrote some disgusting lines about storm clouds over Westminster in his Cantos. I haven't looked at them for twenty-one years and certainly don't intend to look them up again now. Ever since I was fifteen when I first read Pound's boring filth, the thought of storm clouds over Westminster has filled me with nausea and gloom." In a letter dated 15 January 1973, writer Guy Davenport reported, "Auberon Waugh in the English press giggled over Ez's demise [1 November 1972], informing his audience that Pound's silly verse was so much twaddle, and his example the cause of Modern Poetry and all its vulgar pretense. He also confesses that he immensely enjoyed torturing Pound in the madhouse with letters asking what passages in The Cantos might mean. Pound's replies, tedious and lengthy, he destroyed after having his laugh."

Waugh broadly supported Margaret Thatcher in her first years as prime minister, but by 1983 he became disillusioned by the government's economic policy, which he felt used the destructive economics and cultural ideas of the New Right. When Thatcher became a strong public opponent of his friend and Sunday Telegraph editor Peregrine Worsthorne, Waugh became a staunch opponent of Thatcher. Her closeness to The Sunday Times' editor Andrew Neil, whom Waugh despised, further confirmed his view.

To a traditional Tory, these were some of the most deplorable aspects of the Thatcher years. There was a certain amount of public posturing in his popular anti-Americanism; he visited the US whenever he could, and spent notable time holidaying in New England and on US speaking tours.

He had a house in France and, despite his conservatism, was a fervent supporter of European integration and the single currency, which he saw as a means of de-Americanising the UK. He said that his ideal government would be a "junta of Belgian ticket inspectors". Neither did he conform to reactionary stereotypes in his strong opposition to the death penalty, or in his antipathy towards the police force in general (especially when they sought to prevent drink-driving; Waugh believed strongly that this was not as serious a problem as it is widely believed to be, and referred to the anti-drink-driving campaign as the "police terror"). He opposed anti-tobacco smoking legislation and in his later years he was highly critical of Labour attempts to ban fox hunting. In 1995 he was against attempts by the then Home Secretary Michael Howard to introduce a national identity card, a policy which at the time was opposed by the Labour Party. Along with Patrick Marnham and Richard West, Waugh was one of three signatories to a letter to The Times that called for a British monument to honour those repatriated as a result of the Yalta Conference; it was eventually erected in 1986.

Waugh held that while the dangers of smoking (especially passive smoking) and drinking were exaggerated, the dangers of hamburger eating were seriously under-reported; he frequently referred to "hamburger gases" as a serious form of atmospheric pollution and even made references to the dangers of "passive hamburger eating". He also claimed that computer games "produce all the symptoms and most known causes of cancer". The Tobacco Advisory Council of the UK organised a pro-smoking book to be ghosted for either Bernard Levin or Auberon Waugh. Neither columnist agreed to put their name to it, but Waugh wrote a foreword endorsing the book and hitting out at the anti-smoking lobby: "Let us hope this book strikes a blow against the new control terrorists", he said. He also posed for photos with a cigarette in his hand.

== Family ==
In 1961, Auberon Waugh married Lady Teresa Onslow, daughter of the 6th Earl of Onslow. They had four children:

- Margaret Sophia Laura Waugh (b. 1962)
- Alexander Evelyn Michael Waugh (30 December 1963 – 22 July 2024)
- Daisy Louisa Dominica Waugh (b. 1967)
- Nathaniel Thomas Biafra Waugh (b. 1968)

They lived at the Old Rectory, Chilton Foliat, Wiltshire, from 1964 to 1971, then moved into Waugh's father's old home, Combe Florey House in Somerset.

== Literary career ==
Waugh wrote five novels before giving up writing fiction, partly in protest at the inadequate money authors received from public lending rights at libraries and partly because he knew he would always be compared unfavourably to his father. The five novels are:

- The Foxglove Saga (1960)
- Path of Dalliance (1963)
- Who Are The Violets Now? (1965)
- Consider the Lilies (1968)
- A Bed of Flowers (1972)

He also wrote a book about the Thorpe case, The Last Word, and a book about Biafra, Biafra: Britain's Shame, co-written with Suzanne Cronje. He made several programmes for ATV in the 1970s.

In 1986, his critical book Another Voice – An Alternative Anatomy of Britain (ISBN 0-947752-71-4) was published and was well received. From that year until his death he also edited the Literary Review magazine, where he organised awards for what he called "real" (rhyming and scanning) poetry, and also a Bad Sex Award for the worst description of sex in a novel.

Two collections of Waugh's Private Eye diary have been published: Four Crowded Years: The Diaries of Auberon Waugh 1972–1976 (Deutsch/Private Eye, 1976), and A Turbulent Decade: The Diaries of Auberon Waugh 1976–1985 (Private Eye, 1985).

In 1991, he was interviewed by Anthony Howard for the Thames TV documentary Waugh Memorial.

Waugh opined on many and various topics. For example, in a leader piece for the Literary Review in 1991 he commented upon sceptic James Randi's dismissal on British television of the supposed art of dowsing for water. Waugh noted that, although he had no great interest in the subject, he lived in a house which had a well sunk through 70 ft (21 m) of rock on nothing more than the advice of a dowser.

== Death ==
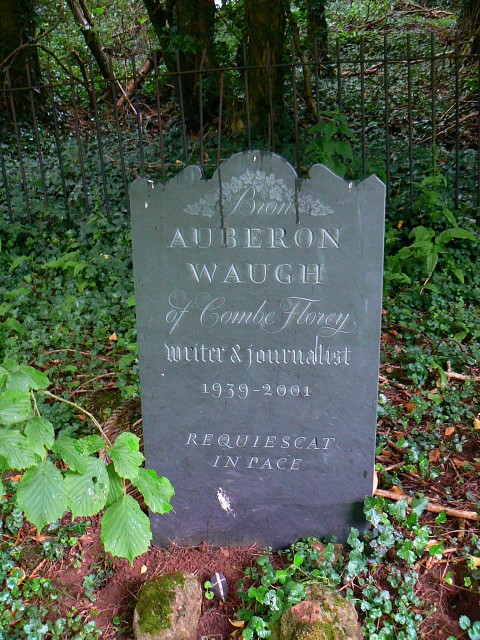
Auberon Waugh's grave near the Church of St Peter & St Paul, Combe Florey, Somerset

Waugh's health declined considerably throughout the final months of his life, and he died from heart failure at Combe Florey House on 16 January 2001, at the age of 61. He is buried in the graveyard of the Church of St Peter & St Paul, Combe Florey.
