= Stinchcombe =

Village and civil parish in Gloucestershire, England

Stinchcombe Hill
- Site of Special Scientific Interest
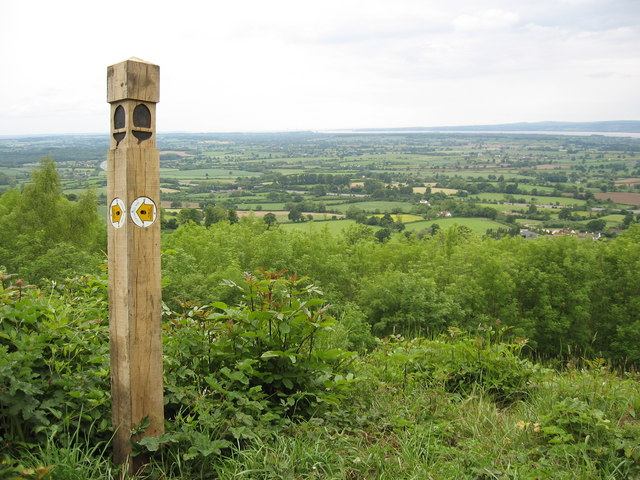
- Stinchcombe Hill

- Location within Gloucestershire
- Location of Stinchcombe Hill.
- Area of search: Gloucestershire
- Grid reference: ST7360698151
- Coordinates: 51.68104°N 2.38179°W
- Interest: Biological
- Area: 28.6 ha (71 acres)
- Notification date: 1966

Stinchcombe is a small village and civil parish in Gloucestershire, England on the B4060 road between Dursley and North Nibley. The church is called St Cyr's and its churchyard contains 40–60 gravestones. The population taken at the 2011 census was 480.

It gives its name to the nearby Stinchcombe Hill (grid reference ST7360698151) which is a 28.6-hectare (71-acre), a nearly detached part of the Cotswold Edge, which was notified as a biological Site of Special Scientific Interest in 1966.

== Stinchcombe Hill ==
Stinchcombe Hill lies west of Dursley and forms part of the Jurassic limestone scarp of the Cotswolds. The site represents the semi-natural calcareous grasslands supporting particular flora and fauna, and particularly a number of rare and uncommon species.

The Hill has a large golf course on the top, and has a public right of way round its edge which is part of the Cotswold Way. (The exact line of the right of way and its interaction with the golf greens has been the subject of some controversy over the years.) The rights of way were redefined by a public enquiry in 2012 and are signposted.

== Views ==
The view from Drakestone Point (219 metres (719 ft) at grid reference ST737981) over the Vale to the River Severn and Forest of Dean beyond, is particularly fine, but the tranquility is injured by the proximity of the M5 Motorway. Since 1992 volunteers have done a great deal of work on the Hill, attempting to restore the open views over the Severn Vale. The cleared areas can be seen from the M5, and the Cotswold Way has now been re-routed around the Hill to take advantage of this work.

== Notable residents ==
The novelist Evelyn Waugh lived at Piers Court in Stinchcombe from 1937 to 1956. During this time he wrote some of his best known works, including Scoop, Brideshead Revisited, Men at Arms and Officers and Gentlemen. The village is also the birthplace of William Tyndale (ca. 1494- 1536), scholar and translator of the Bible into English.

== Popular culture ==
- The Potter family in the Harry Potter series is said to have originated in Stinchcombe in the 12th century, with Harry Potter's earliest known ancestor being known as Linfred of Stinchcombe.

== SSSI Source ==
- Natural England SSSI information on the citation
- Natural England SSSI information on the Stincombe Hill unit
