= Alexander Waugh =

English businessman and writer (1963–2024)

- Born: Alexander Evelyn Michael Waugh; 30 December 1963; London, England
- Died: 22 July 2024 (aged 60); Milverton, Somerset, England
- Education: University of Manchester
- Occupation: Writer
- Spouse: Eliza Chancellor (m. 1990)
- Children: 3
- Parents: Auberon Waugh; Lady Teresa Waugh
- Relatives: Daisy Waugh (sister); Evelyn Waugh (grandfather); The 7th Earl of Onslow (uncle)

Alexander Evelyn Michael Waugh (30 December 1963 – 22 July 2024) was an English writer, critic, and journalist. Among other books, he wrote Fathers and Sons: The Autobiography of a Family (2004), about five generations of his own family, and The House of Wittgenstein: A Family at War (2008) about the Wittgenstein family. He was an advocate of the Oxfordian theory, which holds that Edward de Vere, 17th Earl of Oxford was the real author of the works of William Shakespeare.

== Early life ==
Born in Belgravia, London on 30 December 1963, Alexander was the eldest son of Auberon and Lady Teresa Waugh, and the brother of Daisy Waugh and the grandson of Evelyn Waugh. He was educated at Taunton School and the University of Manchester.

== Career ==
Waugh was the opera critic of The Mail on Sunday and then the Evening Standard in the 1990s. His books on music include Classical Music: A New Way of Listening (1995) and Opera: A New Way of Listening (1996).

Waugh's biography Fathers and Sons: The Autobiography of a Family (2004), written at the suggestion of Sir Vidia Naipaul after his father died, is a portrait of the male relations across five generations in his own family. Described as "breezily irreverent" by John Banville in The New York Review of Books, it formed the basis of a BBC Four television documentary, presented by the author, which was broadcast in 2006. He was the general editor of The Complete Works of Evelyn Waugh (43 volumes planned), a project which began in 2009 with the first four volumes appearing in 2017 published by the Oxford University Press.

Waugh's biography of the Wittgenstein family, The House of Wittgenstein: A Family at War, was published in 2008. Terry Eagleton in a review for The Guardian found it an "eminently readable, meticulously researched account of the Wittgenstein madhouse". Although he thought Waugh wrote less about Ludwig Wittgenstein than he would desire, he "certainly casts some light" on the philosopher's "extraordinary contradictions." Ludwig Wittgenstein's biographer Ray Monk, in his review for Standpoint magazine, commented that Waugh, in "an extraordinarily detailed account of how large parts of the Wittgenstein wealth ended up in the hands of the Nazis", uses "much hitherto unknown documentation", making his account "more authoritative and fuller than previous accounts". Monk also notes that "Waugh devotes far more space to [concert pianist] Paul Wittgenstein than he does to Paul's siblings, including his more famous younger brother, the philosopher Ludwig Wittgenstein".

His other books include Time: From Microseconds to Millennia; A Search for the Right Time (1999) and God (2002). In Evelyn Waugh: Fictions, Faith and Family, Michael G. Brennan described Time as being "one of the most intriguing books produced by" any of his later family. "Ranging through religious, classical and renaissance scholarship, it blends past beliefs and theories, often in gently subversive ways, with more recent scientific thought."

== Oxfordian theory and Shakespeare ==
Waugh was an advocate of the Oxfordian theory, which contends that Edward de Vere, 17th Earl of Oxford, wrote the works of William Shakespeare. He discovered what he claimed to be surreptitious allusions embedded in 16th- and 17th-century works revealing that the name William Shakespeare was a pseudonym used by Oxford to write the Shakespeare oeuvre. Of one example which gained coverage in October 2013, Shakespearean scholar Professor Stanley Wells told The Sunday Times: "I'm mystified that an intelligent person like Alexander Waugh can see any significance in this kind of juggling with letters."

Waugh's book, Shakespeare in Court (2014) takes the form of a fictional trial which draws the conclusion that Shakespeare was a front for others but, on this occasion, does not propose another candidate.

He was elected chairman of the De Vere Society in spring 2016 for a three-year term.

In late October 2017, The Guardian reported that Waugh believed the title and dedication of the William Aspley edition of Shakespeare's sonnets of 1609 hold encrypted evidence of the final resting place of the author: de Vere's grave in Westminster Abbey's Poets' Corner.

== Personal life ==
Waugh met his wife, Eliza Chancellor, while they were both students at Manchester University. Eliza is the daughter of the journalist Alexander Chancellor. The couple married in 1990 and had three children.

Waugh was diagnosed with prostate cancer in 2023. He died at his home in Milverton, Somerset, on 22 July 2024, at the age of 60.

== Bibliography ==
=== Books ===
- Classical music: a new way of listening. London: De Agostini Editions. 1995.
  - U.S. publication: Classical music : a new way of listening. New York: Macmillan. 1995., ISBN 978-0-02-860446-6, OL 781239M.
- Opera: A New Way of Listening (De Agostini, 1996), ISBN 978-1-899883-71-4, OL 43495840M.
- Time: From Microseconds to Millennia; A Search for the Right Time (Headline 1999; Carroll and Graf 2000), ISBN 978-0-7472-2178-4, OL 6807783M
- God (Headline 2002; St Martin's Press 2004), ISBN 978-1-4668-7251-6, OL 37409388M
- Fathers and Sons: The Autobiography of a Family (Headline 2004: Nan Talese 2007), ISBN 9780755312542, OL 7993076M.
- The House of Wittgenstein: A Family at War (Doubleday, 2009), ISBN 978-0-307-27872-2, OL 24088914M.
- Shahan, John M.; Waugh, Alexander (2013). Shakespeare Beyond Doubt?: Exposing an Industry in Denial. Tamarac, Fla: Shakespeare Authorship Coalition. ISBN 978-1-62550-033-5. OL 25957325M.

=== Critical studies and reviews of Waugh's work ===
Fathers and sons

- Banville, John (28 June 2007). "The Family Pinfold". The New York Review of Books. 54 (11): 20–21.
- Acocella, Joan (25 June 2007). "Waugh Stories: Life in a Literary Dynasty". The New Yorker.
