= Men at Arms (Waugh novel) =

1952 novel by Evelyn Waugh

- First edition
- Author: Evelyn Waugh
- Language: English
- Series: Sword of Honour
- Genre: War, satire
- Publisher: Chapman & Hall
- Publication date: 1952
- Pages: 314
- Followed by: Officers and Gentlemen

Men at Arms is a 1952 novel by the British novelist Evelyn Waugh.

== Sword of Honour ==
Men at Arms is the first novel in Waugh's Sword of Honour series, the author's look at the Second World War. The novels loosely parallel Waugh's wartime experiences.

== Plot summary ==
The protagonist is Guy Crouchback, heir of a declining aristocratic English Roman Catholic family. Guy has spent his thirties at the family villa in Italy (based on the Earl of Carnarvon's 1885 Villa Altachiara in Portofino). Crouchback has been shunning the world after the failure of his marriage and has decided to return to England at the very beginning of the Second World War, in the belief that the creeping evils of modernity, gradually apparent in the Soviet Union and Nazi Germany, have become all too clearly displayed as a real and embodied enemy.

He attempts to join the Army, finally succeeding with the (fictitious) Royal Corps of Halberdiers, an old but not too fashionable regiment. He trains as an officer and is posted to various centres around Britain. One of the themes is recurring "flaps" or chaos — embarking and disembarking from ships and railway carriages that go nowhere. Crouchback meets Brigadier Ben Ritchie-Hook, a fire eater (probably based on Lieutenant General Sir Adrian Carton de Wiart, a college friend of Waugh's father-in-law whom Waugh knew somewhat from his club) and Apthorpe, a very eccentric fellow officer; in an episode of high farce, the two have a battle of wits and military discipline over an Edwardian thunder-box (portable toilet) which Crouchback observes, amused and detached. Before being sent on active service, he attempts to seduce Virginia, secure in the knowledge that the Catholic Church still regards her as his wife; she refuses him. He and Ben Ritchie-Hook share an adventure during the Dakar Expedition in 1940. Apthorpe dies in Freetown, supposedly of a tropical disease; when it is discovered that Guy gave him a bottle of whisky when visiting him in hospital (there is an implication that Apthorpe's disease, unknown to Guy, was really alcoholic liver failure), Guy is sent home, having blotted his copybook.

== Awards ==
Waugh received the 1952 James Tait Black Memorial Prize for Men at Arms.

== Dramatisations ==
Men At Arms was dramatised for television in 2001 along with the two other novels in the Sword of Honour trilogy, featuring Daniel Craig.
