= Officers and Gentlemen =

1955 novel by Evelyn Waugh

- Author: Evelyn Waugh
- Language: English
- Series: Sword of Honour
- Genre: War, satire
- Publisher: Chapman & Hall
- Publication date: 1955
- Pages: 335
- Preceded by: Men at Arms
- Followed by: Unconditional Surrender

Officers and Gentlemen is a 1955 novel by the British novelist Evelyn Waugh.

== Sword of Honour trilogy ==
Officers and Gentlemen is the second novel in Waugh's Sword of Honour trilogy, the author's look at the Second World War. The novels loosely parallel Waugh's wartime experiences. The first was Men at Arms (1952), the third was Unconditional Surrender (1961).

== Plot summary ==
Sent back to the UK in disgrace at the end of the first novel, Guy Crouchback – heir of a declining aristocratic English Roman Catholic family – manages to find a place in a fledgling commando brigade, training on a Scottish island under an old friend, Tommy Blackhouse. Tommy is also the man for whom Guy's wife Virginia left him. Another trainee is Ivor Claire, whom Guy regards as the flower of English chivalry. Guy learns to exploit the niceties of military ways of doing things with the assistance of Colonel "Jumbo" Trotter, an elderly Halberdier who knows all the strings to pull.

Guy is posted to Cairo, Allied headquarters for the Mediterranean and Middle East. He becomes caught up in the evacuation of Crete, where he acquits himself well, though chaos and muddle prevail. At this time he meets the slippery Corporal-Major Ludovic. (Waugh may have based the character of Ludovic on one or two real people: the soldier of fortune and novelist John Lodwick, and/or the future press tycoon and politician Robert Maxwell.) In the final stages of the evacuation, they escape with a few others in a small boat, but run out of fuel. The sapper Captain in command becomes delirious, and subsequently disappears (there is an implication that he has been disposed of by Ludovic). Eventually they reach Egypt, where Ludovic carries a disoriented Guy ashore. Apparently a hero, Ludovic is commissioned as an officer.

As Guy recovers in hospital, Mrs Stitch, a character who turns up in other Waugh books, takes him under her well-connected wing. She also tries to protect Claire, who was evacuated from Crete even though his unit's orders were to fight to the last and then surrender as prisoners of war. She sends Guy the long way home to England, possibly to prevent him from compromising the cover story worked up to protect Claire from desertion charges.

Guy finds himself once more in his club, asking around for a suitable job.

== Dramatisations ==
Officers and Gentlemen was dramatised for television in 1967 and 2001 along with the two other novels in the Sword of Honour trilogy, featuring first Edward Woodward and then Daniel Craig.
