= List of churches in Conwy County Borough =

This is a list of churches in Conwy, a unitary authority area in North Wales.

== Active churches ==
Name	Image	Community (settlement)	Dedication or namesake	Web	Founded	Denomination	Benefice	Notes
St Michael, Abergele		Abergele	Michael		Medieval	Church in Wales	Aled Mission Area	
St Therese of Lisieux, Abergele		Abergele	Thérèse of Lisieux		1934	Roman Catholic	Abergele & Towyn	
Abergele Methodist Church		Abergele				Methodist	Conwy & Prestatyn Circuit	
Capel Mynydd Seion, Abergele		Abergele	Mount Zion			Presbyterian		
Eglwys Crist Independent Chapel, Abergele		Abergele	Jesus		1842	Independent		Rebuilt 1861. Grade II listed. Coflein only; defunct?
St David, Pensarn		Abergele (Pensarn)	David of Wales		1880	Church in Wales	Aled Mission Area	Community centre with worship area replaced old church 2011
St George, St George		Abergele (St George)	George		Medieval	Church in Wales	Aled Mission Area	Rebuilt 1887–1894
St George Independent Chapel		Abergele (St George)			1825	Independent		Moved to Bodoryn 1866
St Mary, Betws-y-Coed		Betws-y-Coed	Mary		1870–1873	Church in Wales	Bro Gwydyr	Replaced St Michael's (now disused)
Capel Bryn Mawr, Betws-y-Coed		Betws-y-Coed				Presbyterian		
St Michael, Betws yn Rhos		Betws yn Rhos	Michael		Medieval	Church in Wales	Aled Mission Area	Rebuilt 1838–39
Capel Horeb, Betws yn Rhos		Betws yn Rhos	Mount Horeb			Methodist	Cymru	
Capel Hyfrydle, Betws yn Rhos		Betws yn Rhos				Presbyterian		
St Elian, Llanelian		Betws yn Rhos (Llanelian-yn-Rhos)	Elian		Medieval	Church in Wales	Aled Mission Area	
Capel Ebeneser, Llanelian		Betws yn Rhos (Llanelian-yn-Rhos)	Eben-Ezer			Baptist Union		
Capel Seion, Capel Garmon		Bro Garmon (Capel Garmon)	Zion			Presbyterian		
Capel Siloam, Capel Garmon		Bro Garmon (Capel Garmon)	Pool of Siloam		1823	Independent		Coflein only; defunct?
Capel Bethel, Melin-y-Coed		Bro Garmon (Melin-y-Coed)	Bethel			Presbyterian	Gofalaeth Helen Wyn Jones	
St Tyddyd, Penmachno		Bro Machno (Penmachno)	Tyddyd		Medieval	Church in Wales	Bro Gwydyr	Rebuilt 1857
Penmachno United Church		Bro Machno (Penmachno)				Presbyterian		
St Mary, Caerhun		Caerhun	Mary		Medieval	Church in Wales	Bro Celynnin	
St Peter, Llanbedr-y-Cennin		Caerhun (Llanbedr-y-Cennin)	Peter		Medieval	Church in Wales	Bro Celynnin	
Capel Seion, Rowen		Caerhun (Rowen)	Zion			Presbyterian	Gofalaeth Helen Wyn Jones	
Capel Tal-y-bont		Caerhun (Tal-y-bont)				Presbyterian	Gofalaeth Helen Wyn Jones	
Capel Ty'n-y-groes		Caerhun (Ty'n-y-groes)				Presbyterian	Gofalaeth Helen Wyn Jones	
St Mary Magdalene, Cerrigydrudion		Cerrigydrudion	Mary Magdalene		Medieval	Church in Wales	Cerrigydrudion & Llanfihangel	
Capel Jerwsalem, Cerrigydrudion		Cerrigydrudion	Jerusalem			Presbyterian		
Capel Ty Mawr, Cwmpenanner		Cerrigydrudion (Cwmpenanner)				Presbyterian		
Capel Cefnbrith, Glasfryn		Cerrigydrudion (Glasfryn)				Presbyterian		
St David, Colwyn Bay		Colwyn Bay	David of Wales		1902–03	Church in Wales	Aled Mission Area	Grade II listed. Services held in Welsh
St Paul, Colwyn Bay		Colwyn Bay	Paul		1872	Church in Wales	Aled Mission Area	Current building (Grade II listed) built 1887–1911
St Joseph, Colwyn Bay		Colwyn Bay	Joseph		1895	Roman Catholic	Colwyn Bay	Building 1900. Served by Oblates of St Mary Immaculate
Princes Drive Baptist Church, Colwyn Bay		Colwyn Bay				Baptist Union GB		
Nant-y-Glyn Methodist Church		Colwyn Bay				Methodist	Conwy & Prestatyn Circuit	
Capel Horeb, Colwyn Bay		Colwyn Bay	Mount Horeb			Methodist	Cymru	
Seion Presbyterian Church, Colwyn Bay		Colwyn Bay	Zion			Presbyterian		
New Life Revival Church		Colwyn Bay				Independent		
Christ Church, Bryn-y-Maen		Colwyn Bay (Bryn-y-Maen)	Jesus		1897–1899	Church in Wales	Aled Mission Area	AKA 'Cathedral of the Hills'
St Mary & All Saints, Conwy		Conwy	Mary & All Saints		Medieval	Church in Wales	Bro Celynnin	Once church of Cistercian Aberconwy Abbey
St Michael & All Angels, Conwy		Conwy	Michael & Angels		1915	Roman Catholic	Conwy & Llandudno Junction	
St John's Methodist Church, Conwy		Conwy	John ?			Methodist	Conwy & Prestatyn Circuit	
Capel Carmel, Conwy		Conwy	Mount Carmel			Presbyterian		
All Saints, Deganwy		Conwy (Deganwy)	All Saints		1897–1899	Church in Wales	Aberconwy Mission Area	
Capel Bethel, Deganwy		Conwy (Deganwy)	Bethel			Methodist	Cymru	
Capel Peniel, Deganwy		Conwy (Deganwy)	Penuel			Presbyterian		
St Benedict, Gyffin		Conwy (Gyffin)	Benedict of Nursia		Medieval	Church in Wales	Bro Celynnin	
St Michael & All Angels, Llandudno Junction		Conwy (Llandudno Junction)	Michael & Angels		1928–1930	Church in Wales	Aberconwy Mission Area	
Holy Family, Llandudno Junction		Conwy (Llandudno Junction)	Holy Family			Roman Catholic	Conwy & Llandudno Junction	
Capel Preswylfa, Llandudno Junction		Conwy (Llandudno Junction)				Methodist	Cymru	
Capel Pensarn, Llandudno Junction		Conwy (Llandudno Junction)				Presbyterian		
Llandudno Junction Seventh-Day Adventist Church		Conwy (Llandudno Junction)				7th-Day Adventist		
i61 Church		Conwy (Llandudno Junction)				Independent		
SS Eleri & Mary, Llanrhos		Conwy (Llanrhos)	Hilary (?) & Mary		Medieval	Church in Wales	Aberconwy Mission Area	
St Mary, Dolgarrog		Dolgarrog	Mary		1913	Church in Wales	Bro Gwydyr	Destroyed 1925 in damburst; new church 1926, 1976
St Gwyddelan, Dolwyddelan		Dolwyddelan	Gwyddelan		Medieval	Church in Wales	Bro Gwydyr	
Capel Moreia, Dolwyddelan		Dolwyddelan	Moriah			Presbyterian		
St Martin, Eglwysbach		Eglwysbach	Martin of Tours		Medieval	Church in Wales	Aberconwy Mission Area	Rebuilt 1782
Capel Ebeneser, Eglwysbach		Eglwysbach	Eben-Ezer			Methodist	Cymru	
Capel Eglwys Bach		Eglwysbach				Presbyterian		
St Celynnin, Llangelynnin		Henryd (Llangelynnin)	Celynnin		Medieval	Church in Wales	Bro Celynnin	One of the oldest and remotest churches in Wales
Capel Tabernacl, Llechwedd		Henryd (Llechwedd)	Tabernacle			Presbyterian		
Kinmel Bay Church		Kinmel Bay & Towyn (Kinmel Bay)				FIEC		
St Mary, Towyn		Kinmel Bay & Towyn (Towyn)	Mary		1872–73	Church in Wales	Aber-Morfa Mission Area	
Christ the King, Towyn		Kinmel Bay & Towyn (Towyn)	Jesus		1973–74	Roman Catholic	Abergele & Towyn	Congregation probably older
Capel Salem, Towyn		Kinmel Bay & Towyn (Towyn)	Jerusalem			Presbyterian	Gofalaeth Prestatyn	
North Coast Church		Kinmel Bay & Towyn (Towyn)				Assemblies of God		
Church of God in Towyn		Kinmel Bay & Towyn (Towyn)				Churches of God		
Capel Salem, Efail Uchaf		Llanddoged & Maenan (Efail Uchaf)	Jerusalem			Presbyterian	Gofalaeth Helen Wyn Jones	
St Doged, Llandoged		Llanddoged & Maenan (Llanddoged)	Doget		Medieval	Church in Wales	Aberconwy Mission Area	
Capel Soar, Maenan		Llanddoged & Maenan (Maenan)	Zoara			Methodist	Cymru	
St Cynbryd, Llanddulas		Llanddulas & Rhyd-y-foel (Llanddulas)	Cynbryd		pre-1868	Church in Wales	Aled Mission Area	Rebuilt 1868
Llanddulas Methodist Church		Llanddulas & Rhyd-y-foel (Llanddulas)				Methodist	Conwy & Prestatyn Circuit	
Capel Salem, Rhyd-y-foel		Llanddulas & Rhyd-y-foel (Rhyd-y-foel)	Jerusalem			Methodist	Cymru	
Holy Trinity, Llandudno		Llandudno	Trinity		1865–1874	Church in Wales	Plwyf Llandudno	
Our Lady Star of the Sea, Llandudno		Llandudno	Mary		1891–1893	Roman Catholic	Llandudno	
SS Mary & Abaskhyron, Llandudno		Llandudno	Mary & Abaskhiron			Coptic Orthodox		
Llandudno Baptist Church		Llandudno				Baptist Union GB		Previously Our Saviour, Church in Wales (built 1911)
Capel Tabernacl, Llandudno		Llandudno	Tabernacle			Baptist Union		
St John's Methodist Church, Llandudno		Llandudno	John ?		1861	Methodist	Conwy & Prestatyn Circuit	Current building 1866
Capel Ebeneser, Llandudno		Llandudno	Eben-Ezer			Methodist	Cymru	
Seilo Eglwys Unedig, Llandudno		Llandudno	Shiloh			BU/MC/PCW/UWI		4 churches merged 2000. Meet in Seilo Presbyterian
Gloddaeth United Church, Llandudno		Llandudno				URC / PCW		
West Shore Baptist Church, Llandudno		Llandudno				FIEC		Previously Salvation Army and Brethren
Queens Road Church, Llandudno		Llandudno			1953	FIEC-AECW		
Emmanuel Church, Llandudno		Llandudno	Jesus			Independent		
St Catherine, Bryn Pydew		Llandudno (Bryn Pydew)	Catherine of Alexandria			Church in Wales	Aberconwy Mission Area	
St Paul, Craig-y-Don		Llandudno (Craig-y-Don)	Paul		1893–1901	Church in Wales	Aberconwy Mission Area	
St David's Methodist Church, Craig-y-Don		Llandudno (Craig-y-Don)	David of Wales		1924	Methodist	Conwy & Prestatyn Circuit	
Capel Ainon, Glanwydden		Llandudno (Glanwydden)	Ænon			Baptist Union		
St Tudno, Llandudno		Llandudno (Great Orme)	Tudno		Medieval	Church in Wales	Plwyf Llandudno	Original parish church of Llandudno until 1840
St Cystennin, Llangystennin		Llandudno (Llangystennin)	Cystennin		Medieval	Church in Wales	Aberconwy Mission Area	Rebuilt 1843
St David, Penrhyn Bay		Llandudno (Penrhyn Bay)	David of Wales		c. 1920	Church in Wales	Aberconwy Mission Area	First building 1929, rebuilt 1963
Penrhyn Bay Presbyterian Church		Llandudno (Penrhyn Bay)				Presbyterian		
St Mary & Christ Church, Llanfairfechan		Llanfairfechan	Mary & Jesus		1864	Church in Wales	Plwyf Dwylan	Rededicated 1999 on closure of St Mary's
St Mary of the Angels, Llanfairfechan		Llanfairfechan	Mary			Roman Catholic	Conwy & Llandudno Junction	
Capel Horeb, Llanfairfechan		Llanfairfechan	Mount Horeb			Presbyterian		Chapel (1910–1912) sold, meetings in vestry
St Mary, Llanfair Talhaiarn		Llanfair Talhaiarn	Mary		Medieval	Church in Wales	Aled Mission Area	
Capel Soar, Llanfair Talhaiarn		Llanfair Talhaiarn	Zoara			Presbyterian	Bro Aled	
Capel Tabor, Llanfair Talhaiarn		Llanfair Talhaiarn	Mount Tabor			Presbyterian		
Capel Carmel, Moelfre		Llanfair Talhaiarn (Moelfre)	Mount Carmel			Methodist	Cymru	
St Michael, Llanfihangel Glen Myfyr		Llanfihangel Glyn Myfyr	Michael		Medieval	Church in Wales	Cerrigydrudion & Llanfihangel	
Capel Maes yr Odyn, Llanfihangel Glyn Myfyr		Llanfihangel Glyn Myfyr				Presbyterian		
St Digain, Llangernyw		Llangernyw	Digain		Medieval	Church in Wales	Aled Mission Area	
Capel Bethabara, Llangernyw		Llangernyw	Bethabara			Baptist Union		
Capel y Cwm, Llangernyw		Llangernyw				Presbyterian	Gofalaeth Helen Wyn Jones	
Capel Pandy Tudur		Llangernyw (Pandy Tudur)				Presbyterian	Gofalaeth Helen Wyn Jones	
Capel Cefn Coch, Llangernyw		Llangernyw (Pentre Isaf)				Presbyterian	Gofalaeth Helen Wyn Jones	
Capel Cefn Nannau, Llangwm		Llangwm				Presbyterian		
Capel Dinmael		Llangwm (Dinmael)				Presbyterian		
St Catherine, Maerdy		Llangwm (Maerdy)	Catherine of Alexandria		1878	Church in Wales	Llangwm	
SS Nefydd & Mary, Llannefydd		Llannefydd	Nefydd & Mary		Medieval	Church in Wales	Denbigh Mission Area	
Capel Llannefydd		Llannefydd				Presbyterian	Bro Aled	
Capel Cefnberain		Llannefydd (Cefnberain)				Presbyterian	Bro Aled	
St Grwst, Llanrwst		Llanrwst	Grwst		Medieval	Church in Wales	Aberconwy Mission Area	
The Good Shepherd, Llanrwst		Llanrwst	Jesus		1956	Roman Catholic	Conwy & Llandudno Junction	
Capel Penuel, Llanrwst		Llanrwst	Penuel			Baptist Union		
Capel Horeb, Llanrwst		Llanrwst	Mount Horeb			Methodist	Cymru	
Capel Seion, Llanrwst		Llanrwst	Zion			Presbyterian		
Capel Heol Scotland, Llanrwst		Llanrwst				Presbyterian		
St Ffraid, Glan Conwy		Llansanffraid Glan Conwy	Brigid of Kildare		Medieval	Church in Wales	Aberconwy Mission Area	
Capel Bryn Ebeneser, Llansanffraid		Llansanffraid Glan Conwy				Presbyterian		
St Sannan, Llansannan		Llansannan	Sannan		Medieval	Church in Wales	Aled Mission Area	
Capel Bethania, Llansannan		Llansannan	Bethany			Baptist Union		
Llansannan United Church		Llansannan				Presbyterian	Bro Aled	Meets in Capel Coffa Henry Rees
Capel Hiraethog, Llansannan		Llansannan				Presbyterian	Bro Aled	Meets in Capel Coffa Henry Rees
St Thomas, Bylchau		Llansannan (Bylchau)	Thomas		1857	Church in Wales	Denbigh Mission Area	
Capel Groes		Llansannan (Groes)				Presbyterian	Bro Aled	
St Cynfran, Llysfaen		Llysfaen	Cynfran		Medieval	Church in Wales	Aled Mission Area	
Capel Tabor, Llysfaen		Llysfaen	Mount Tabor			Baptist Union		
SS Catherine & John the Baptist, Old Colwyn		Old Colwyn	Catherine & John B		1899–1903	Church in Wales	Aled Mission Area	St John the Baptist until 2013 closure of St Catherine's
Sacred Heart, Old Colwyn		Old Colwyn	Sacred Heart			Roman Catholic	Old Colwyn	
Old Colwyn Baptist Church		Old Colwyn				Baptist Union GB		
Old Colwyn Methodist Church		Old Colwyn				Methodist	Conwy & Prestatyn Circuit	
Capel Disgwylfa, Penmaen		Old Colwyn				Methodist	Cymru	
Capel Hebron, Old Colwyn		Old Colwyn				Presbyterian		
Old Colwyn United Reformed Church		Old Colwyn				URC		
Sure Hope Church, Colwyn Bay		Old Colwyn				Assemblies of God		
St Seiriol, Penmaenmawr		Penmaenmawr	Seiriol		1867	Church in Wales	Plwyf Dwylan	Not on CiW site but on benefice site
St David, Penmaenmawr		Penmaenmawr	David of Wales		1893	Church in Wales	Plwyf Dwylan	Welsh services
St Paul's United Church, Penmaenmawr		Penmaenmawr	Paul		1880s	Methodist / URC	Bangor & Holyhead Circuit	1991 merger of URC and St Paul's Methodist
Eglwys y Berth, Penmaenmawr		Penmaenmawr				Presbyterian		Chapel sold, meetings in vestry
St Gwynan, Penmaenmawr		Penmaenmawr (Dwygyfylchi)	Gwynan		pre-C18th	Church in Wales	Plwyf Dwylan	Rebuilt 1760, 1889
Oasis Christian Centre, Dwygyfylchi		Penmaenmawr (Dwygyfylchi)				Independent		
St George, Rhos-on-Sea		Rhos-on-Sea	George		1913	Church in Wales	Aled Mission Area	
St Trillo's Chapel, Rhos-on-Sea		Rhos-on-Sea	Trillo		Ancient	Church in Wales	Aled Mission Area	Tiny 6th-century chapel
Rhos-on-Sea Methodist Church		Rhos-on-Sea				Methodist	Conwy & Prestatyn Circuit	
Rhos-on-Sea United Reformed Church		Rhos-on-Sea				URC		
St Trillo, Rhos-on-Sea		Rhos-on-Sea (Llandrillo yn Rhos)	Trillo		Medieval	Church in Wales	Aled Mission Area	
Capel y Rhos		Rhos-on-Sea (Llandrillo yn Rhos)				Presbyterian		2008 merger of three chapels. New building 2008
St Mary, Trefriw		Trefriw	Mary		Medieval	Church in Wales	Bro Gwydyr	
Capel Peniel, Trefriw		Trefriw	Penuel			Presbyterian		
St Rhychwyn, Llanrhychwyn		Trefriw (Llanrhychwyn)	Rhychwyn		Medieval	Church in Wales	Bro Gwydyr	
Capel Seion, Ysbyty Ifan		Ysbyty Ifan	Zion			Presbyterian	Gofalaeth Helen Wyn Jones	
Capel Padog		Ysbyty Ifan (Padog)				Presbyterian	Gofalaeth Helen Wyn Jones	

== Defunct churches ==
Name	Image	Community (settlement)	Dedication	Web	Founded	Redundant	Denomination	Notes
St Michael, Betws-y-Coed		Betws-y-Coed	Michael		Medieval	2000	Church in Wales	Still consecrated; occasional services
Our Lady of the Woods, Betws-y-Coed		Betws-y-Coed	Mary		1961	2002	Roman Catholic	Converted for domestic use
St John, Trofarth		Betws yn Rhos (Trofarth)	John ?		1873		Church in Wales	Permission for domestic use conversion granted 2009
St Garmon, Capel Garmon		Bro Garmon (Capel Garmon)	Germanus of Auxerre		Medieval	pre-2006	Church in Wales	Originally chapel of ease to Llanrwst. Now a store
St Enclydwyn's Mission Church, Cwm Penmachno		Bro Machno (Cwm Penmachno)	Enclydwyn		1921	1981	Church in Wales	
St Curig, Capel Curig		Capel Curig	Quriaqos		1883	1992	Church in Wales	Now a luxury B&B establishment
St Julitta, Capel Curig		Capel Curig	Julietta		Medieval	1970s	Church in Wales	Previously St Curig's; dedication changed when new St Curig was opened
St Andrew, Colwyn Bay		Colwyn Bay	Andrew		1908	2013	Church in Wales	
St Elizabeth, Dolwyddelan		Dolwyddelan	Elizabeth		1886		Church in Wales	Converted for domestic use
St Celynnin's New Church, Llangelynnin		Henryd	Celynnin		1840	1980s	Church in Wales	Built to replace old church (see above)
St George, Llandudno		Llandudno	George		1840–41	2002	Church in Wales	Now offices
St John the Baptist, Pontygwyddel		Llanfair Talhaiarn (Pontygwyddel)	John the Baptist		1882	1982	Church in Wales	Now a dwelling
St Mary, Llanfairfechan		Llanfairfechan	Mary		pre-C19th	1999	Church in Wales	Rebuilt 1849
St Winifred, Gwytherin		Llangernyw (Gwytherin)	Winifred		Medieval		Church in Wales	Rebuilt 1867. Now 'The Gwenfrewi Project'
St David, Llangernyw		Llangernyw (Pandy Tudur)	David of Wales		1866–67		Church in Wales	Not confirmed closed
St Jerome, Llangwm		Llangwm	Jerome		Medieval		Church in Wales	Rebuilt 1747
St Mary, Llanrwst		Llanrwst	Mary		1841–42	1980s	Church in Wales	
St Tudwal, Llanrwst		Llanrwst	Tudwal		1900		Roman Catholic	
St Catherine, Old Colwyn		Old Colwyn	Catherine of Alexandria		1837	2013	Church in Wales	Previously chapel of ease to Llandrillo
Our Lady of the Rosary, Penmaenmawr		Penmaenmawr	Mary		pre-1901		Roman Catholic	Previously Penycae Presbyterian (built 1867). Now disused
Pentrefoelas Parish Church		Pentrefoelas	Unknown		C18th		Church in Wales	Rebuilt 1857–1859. Now sold for housing
St John, Ysbyty Ifan		Ysbyty Ifan	John the Baptist		Medieval	2016	Church in Wales	Rebuilt 1861
