= Free Borough of Llanrwst =

Former status on town of Llanrwst, Wales

The Free Borough of Llanrwst was a special privilege granted to the Welsh town of Llanrwst by the Prince of Wales. Llanrwst is now a small town and community on the River Conwy in Conwy County Borough, Wales. It takes its name from the 5th- to 6th-century Saint Grwst. Llanrwst developed around the wool trade, partly because of an edict prohibiting any Welshman from trading within 10 miles (16 km) of Conwy, as Llanrwst was 13 miles (21 km) away and well placed to benefit.

== Origin ==
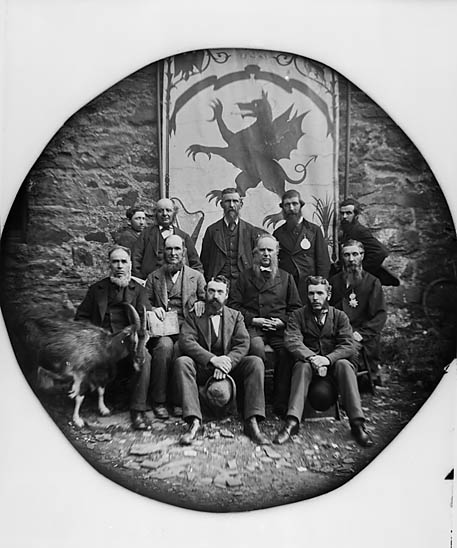
An 1876 picture of the Llanrwst Poets in front of the Llanrwst coat of arms

In 1276 Llywelyn ap Gruffudd, Prince of Wales, also known as Llywelyn the Last, seized the town, declaring it a "free borough" independent from the diocese of Llanelwy. Although the bishop went as far as to seek the help of the Pope to overturn this, his attempts failed, Llywelyn pleading a close family tie to the place as a reason for safeguarding it.

After the death of Llywelyn in 1282, each further new attempt by the bishop of Llanelwy failed: the Cistercian monks of Aberconwy Abbey (where Llywelyn the Great, Llywelyn's grandfather, had died in 1240) insisted that it be allowed to keep the independence that had belonged to it for 29 years, and ripped down any banners related to the Bishopric or to Edward I. A century later, the monastery was moved 8 miles (13 km) upriver to Maenan Abbey, near Llanrwst.

The town consequently has its own coat of arms and flag, and this is the origin of the old local motto "Cymru, Lloegr a Llanrwst" (Wales, England and Llanrwst). This motto, a testament to this apparent independence, has now become synonymous with the song of that title, by local band Y Cyrff.

== United Nations ==
In 1947, Llanrwst town council allegedly made an unsuccessful submission to the United Nations for a seat on the security council, stating that Llanrwst was an independent state within Wales. The chairman and secretary of the Llanrwst Historical Society have obtained proof of this from the UN in New York. This is not confirmed in the United Nations Security Council minutes available online. The Llanrwst Almshouses & Museum Trust recently returned the above-mentioned Llanrwst flag to the community. Dating from the 12th century, this emblem would be circumstantial to the legend that it once claimed independence of the United Kingdom.
