= Tu Hwnt i'r Bont =

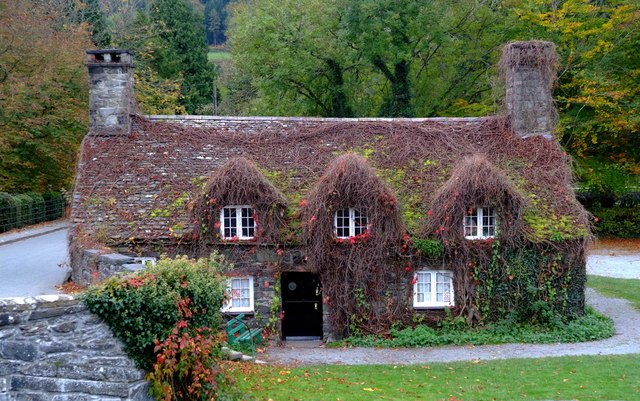
- Tu Hwnt i'r Bont from Pont Fawr, Llanrwst

- Location within Conwy

General information
- Status: Listed Building
- Location: Llanrwst, Conwy County Borough, Wales
- Coordinates: 53.1369°N 3.7982°W

Website
- http://cadw.wales.gov.uk

Tu Hwnt i'r Bont (Welsh for 'beyond the bridge') is a 15th-century grade II listed building in the community of Llanrwst, in Conwy County Borough, in north Wales. It is situated on the left bank of the River Conwy across Pont Fawr ('Big Bridge') from the town of Llanrwst.

Originally built as a farmhouse, Tu Hwnt i'r Bont is actually considerably older than the Inigo Jones bridge it stands beside. Some years later, during the 16th century, the building was used as the Courthouse for the surrounding area.

Over the centuries Tu Hwnt i'r Bont has fallen into disrepair several times and been rebuilt and restored. In the 20th century Tu Hwnt i'r Bont was acquired by the National Trust who have since leased the building. The original leaseholder turned Tu Hwnt i'r Bont into a traditional Welsh Tea Rooms.
