= River Gele =

River in Conwy County Borough, Wales

Coordinates: 53.2944°N 3.5347°W

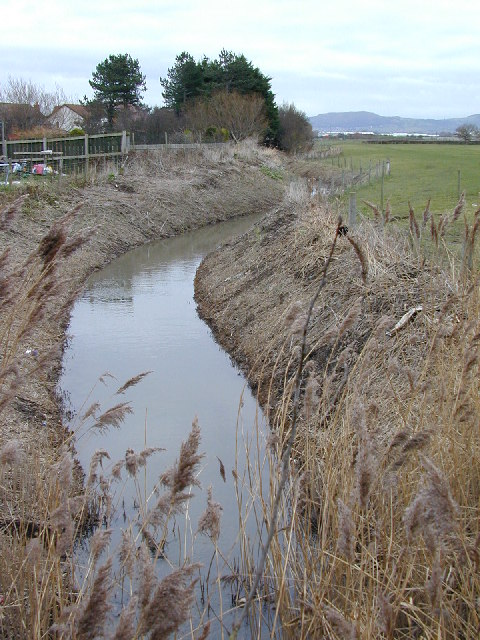
River Gele near Towyn. Looking east from the road bridge.

The River Gele (Welsh: Afon Gele) is a river in the North Wales and a tributary of the River Clwyd. The town of Abergele takes its name from the river. The spelling is a dialectal spelling of the Welsh word gelau (spear or blade). The river gives its name to an electoral ward, called Gele, which includes the southern half of Abergele town.

The river used to empty into the sea direct through the town of Abergele, but the Rhuddlan Marsh Embankment Act 1794 (34 Geo. 3. c. 110), diverted the river from the south of the town in an eastwards direction across the south of Rhuddlan Marsh and into the River Clwyd at Towyn. A short distance of the rivermouth is tidal.

In 2010 and 2011 there were pollution scares on the river near its meeting point with the River Clwyd at Kinmel Bay. The river has also subjected the area to flooding, with the worst recorded event in 1971. This has led to a culverting of some areas and banks being installed on the floodplain to the east and south of Abergele.
