= Moelfre Isaf =

Hill in Conwy County Borough, Wales

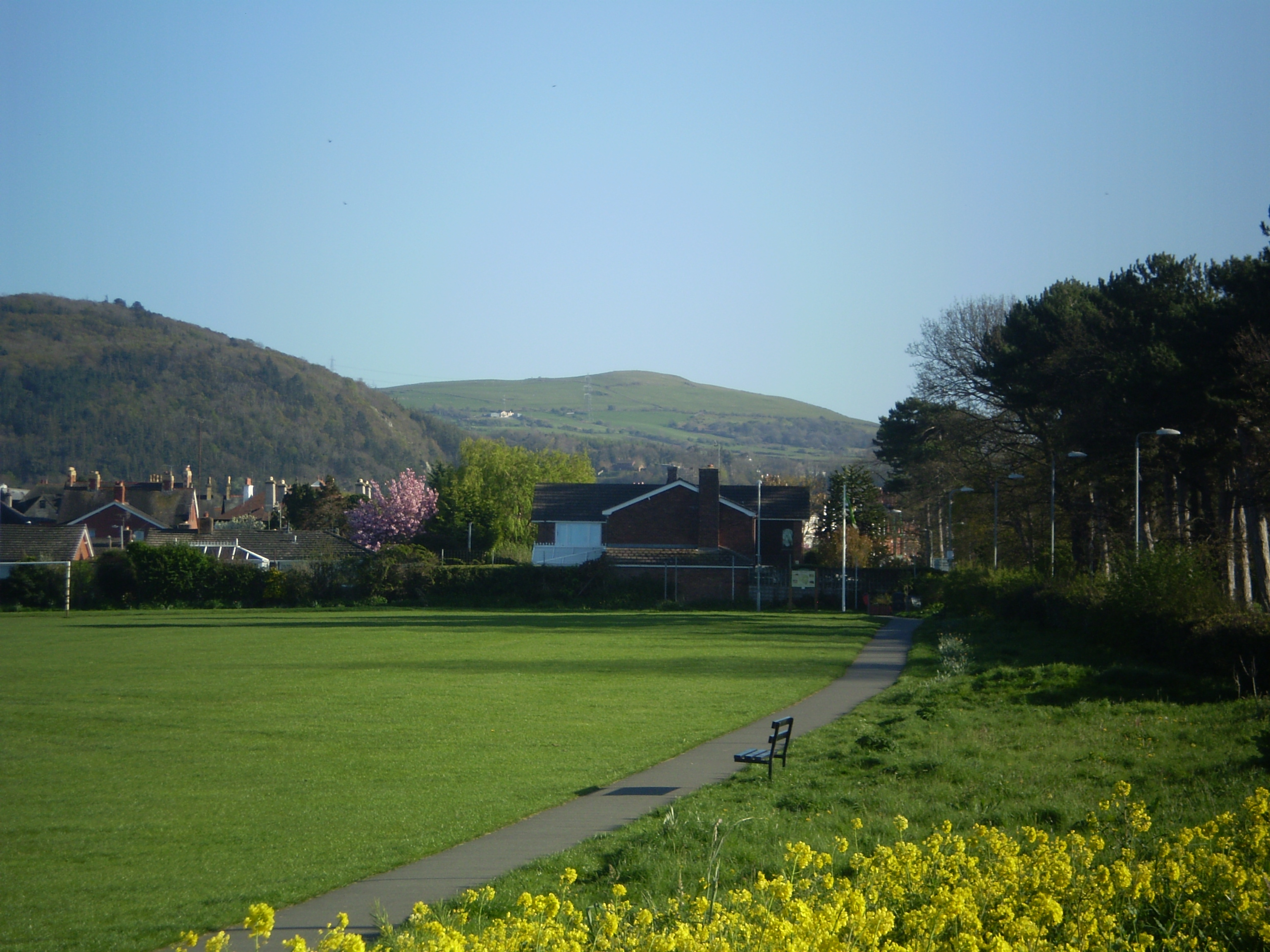
- Moelfre Isaf from Pentre Mawr park, Abergele

Highest point
- Elevation: 317 m (1,040 ft)
- Prominence: 121 m (397 ft)
- Parent peak: Mwdwl-eithin
- Listing: HuMP
- Coordinates: 53°14′47″N 3°34′25″W

Geography
- Location within Wales
- Country: Wales
- County Borough: Conwy
- OS grid: SH951733
- Topo map: OS Landranger 116

Moelfre Isaf is a 317-metre (1,040 ft) hill located to the south of the town of Abergele. There are views towards the Clwydian Range, Snowdonia, and the Isle of Man and the Cumbrian Mountains can be seen on a clear day. Nearby is the small settlement of Moelfre, Conwy. Almost opposite is the higher hill of Moelfre Uchaf.
