= Kinmel Bay and Towyn =

Community in Conwy County Borough, Wales

Kinmel Bay and Towyn: Welsh: Bae Cinmel a Tywyn; Towyn and Kinmel Bay; Tywyn a Bae Cinmel
- Community with town status
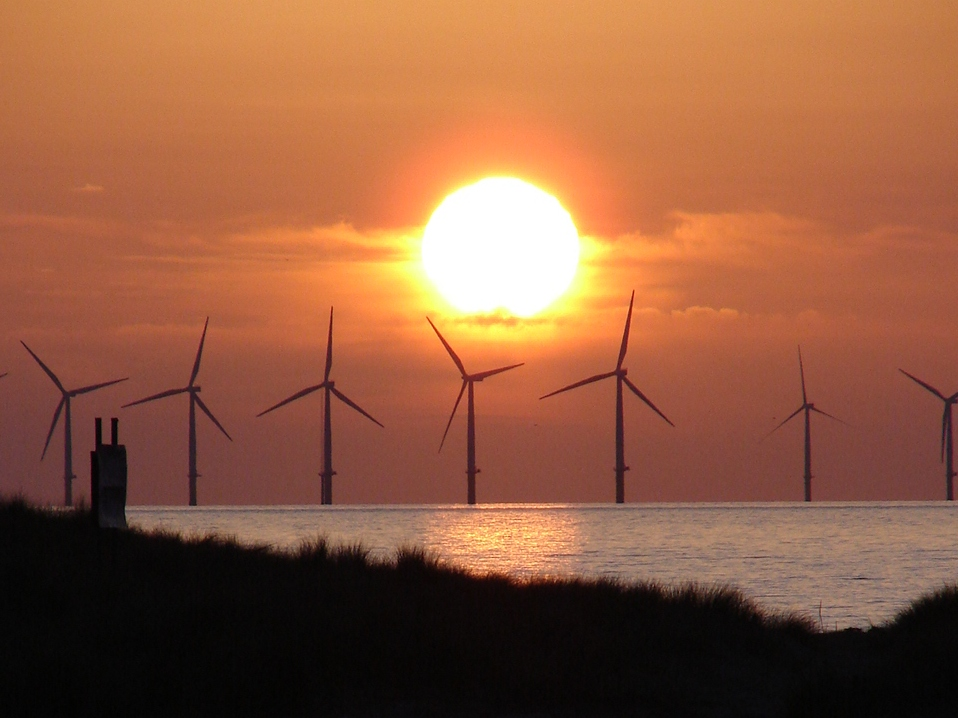
- Sunset over Rhyl Flats seen from Kinmel Bay

- Location within Conwy
- Population: 8,460 (2011)
- OS grid reference: SH9779
- Community: Kinmel Bay and Towyn
- Principal area: Conwy
- Preserved county: Clwyd
- Country: Wales
- Sovereign state: United Kingdom
- Post town: RHYL
- Postcode district: LL18
- Post town: ABERGELE
- Postcode district: LL22
- Dialling code: 01745
- Police: North Wales
- Fire: North Wales
- Ambulance: Welsh
- UK Parliament: Clwyd West
- Senedd Cymru – Welsh Parliament: Clwyd West
- List of places UK Wales Conwy 53.302°N 3.540°W Map of the community

Kinmel Bay and Towyn (Welsh: Bae Cinmel a Tywyn) is a community, with town status, in Conwy County Borough, in Wales. It is located on the coast bordering Denbighshire, from which it is separated by the River Clwyd, and is 2.6 miles (4.2 km) west of Rhyl, 2.5 miles (4.0 km) north east of Abergele and 14.1 miles (22.7 km) east of Conwy. The community includes the holiday resorts of Kinmel Bay and Towyn. It is crossed by the River Gele, which flows from west to east, before joining the River Clwyd on the eastern boundary.

It is governed by a town council, the Towyn and Kinmel Bay Town Council.

At the 2001 census the community had a population of 7,864, increasing to 8,460 at the 2011 census. Before being named Kinmel Bay there was a small settlement called Foryd, which is the name of the bridge crossing into Rhyl. Over half the population were born in England.

The area was developed after 1793, when the Rhuddlan Marsh Commissioners were granted powers to drain the area around Towyn. In the mid 19th century, flood defences were constructed to protect the new Chester to Holyhead railway. Storm-force winds, a high tide and storm surge caused the defences to fail over a 440-yard (400 m) stretch in 1990, resulting in the flooding of 2,800 properties. The flood water covered 4 square miles (10 km^{2}). Since then a rock revetment has been constructed to protect the breached coastline, and further protective works have been carried out to the east.

St Mary's Church, in Towyn, was built in 1873 and designed by George Edmund Street, who was also the architect for the Royal Courts of Justice in London. It is in the Early Decorated style, and is Grade II* listed, as is the nearby Towyn and Kinmel Bay Youth Club, built two years earlier and also designed by Street. Also listed is the third building of Street's contract, the former vicarage, now Ty'n Llan Nursing Home. Horror writer James Henry Kinmel Sangster was born in Kimmel Bay in 1927.
