= Moelfre, Conwy =

Hamlet in Conwy County Borough, Wales

Coordinates: 53°15′22.8″N 3°34′51.8″W

Moelfre
- Location within Conwy
- OS grid reference: SH952743
- Community: Llanfair Talhaiarn
- Principal area: Conwy
- Preserved county: Clwyd
- Country: Wales
- Sovereign state: United Kingdom
- Post town: Llandudno
- Police: North Wales
- Fire: North Wales
- Ambulance: Welsh
- UK Parliament: Bangor Aberconwy
- Senedd Cymru – Welsh Parliament: Clwyd West

Moelfre is a hamlet in the community of Llanfair Talhaiarn, in the county borough of Conwy, North Wales, close to Abergele (3 miles (5 km)), Betws yn Rhos (4 miles (6 km)) and Llanfair Talhaiarn (3 miles (5 km)).

A commercial fishing pond, some small places of accommodation, a small independent beer and mead brewery, a handful of farms and a logging enterprise are located in the region.

There are no shops or amenities nearby (the closest being a petrol station and garage at Pentrefail Crossroads, 1-mile (1.6 km) west, which provides basic foodstuffs for tourist campsites and locals in the area). A public house once located in Moelfre closed a few years ago and is now a large residential property.

Running through Moelfre is the Roman road that was heavily used by Roman soldiers during the Welsh occupation. From the road Moelfre Isaf, a large hill (1,040 feet (320 m)) with views of Snowdonia, can be reached on foot.

A hoard of Bronze Age axe-heads has been found on Moelfre Isaf and the hill was used for the lighting of a beacon (as part of a chain of other high places throughout Wales) to celebrate the marriage of Prince Charles and Lady Diana in 1981.

Wild animals and birds are varied in the woodland and groups of wild deer are sometimes seen in the copses near Moelfre at night.
