= Pont Fawr =

Bridge in Llanrwst, Conwy County Borough, Wales

Pont Fawr Llanrwst Bridge Bridge in Wales
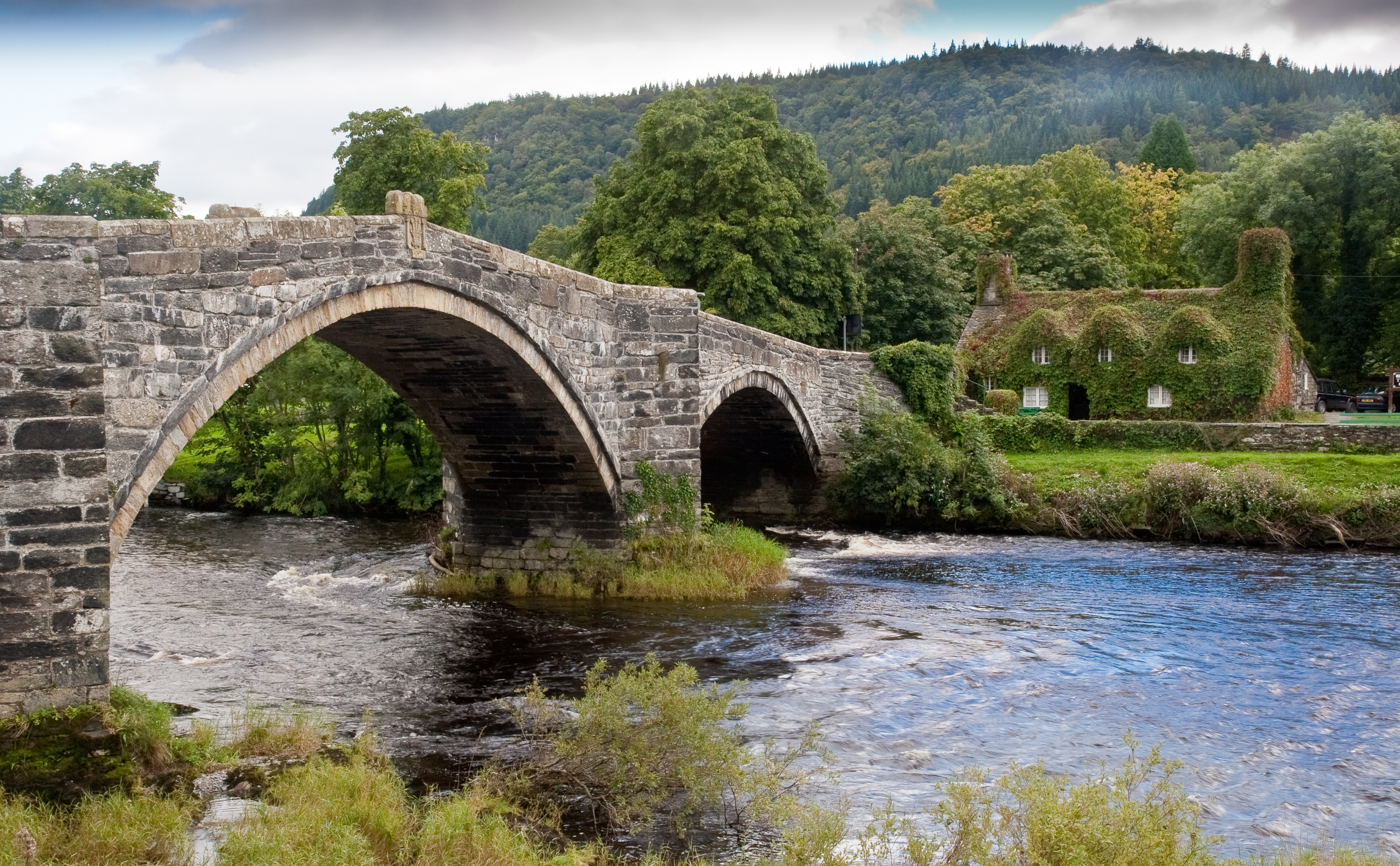
- View of the bridge looking south
- Coordinates: 53.1369°N 3.7976°W
- Carries: Vehicular/pedestrian traffic
- Crosses: River Conwy
- Locale: Llanrwst, Conwy County Borough, Wales

Characteristics
- Material: Gritstone/Welsh slate rubble
- Total length: 51 m (167 ft)
- No. of spans: 3
- Piers in water: 2

History
- Construction end: c. 1636

Listed Building – Grade I
- Official name: Pont Fawr (Llanrwst Bridge) (partly in the Community of Trefriw)
- Designated: 25 January 1951
- Reference no.: 3612

Scheduled monument
- Official name: Llanrwst Bridge
- Reference no.: DE055

Location
- Interactive map of Pont Fawr

Pont Fawr (also known as Llanrwst Bridge) crosses the River Conwy in the town of Llanrwst, Conwy County Borough, Wales. Traditionally attributed to the architect Inigo Jones, it was built in around 1636. The bridge is 51 m (167 ft) in length and carries vehicles and pedestrians. It is a Grade I listed building and a Scheduled monument.

== History ==
The present bridge was a replacement for an earlier crossing destroyed by flooding. Permission for reconstruction was given in 1634, and the bridge carries datestones on both sides giving a completion date of 1636. There is a long tradition which attributes the design of the bridge to Inigo Jones. This arises from the commissioning of the bridge by Sir Richard Wynn (1588–1649) who served as Treasurer to Queen Henrietta Maria, consort of Charles I, and who had connections to Jones. Although there is no documentary evidence linking Jones to the bridge, he did design a plaque for Wynn which was placed in Llanrwst Church. In his Clwyd volume in the Buildings of Wales series published in 2003, the architectural historian Edward Hubbard notes that the suggested connection is "less wildly impossible than other Jones attributions in Wales". John B. Hilling supports this view. In his study published in 2018, The Architecture of Wales from the first to the twenty-first century, he notes that the rebuilding of the bridge was undertaken at the direction of the king's Privy Council when Jones was serving as Charles' Surveyor general and suggests that these connections support the attribution to Jones.

The crossing is subject to serious flooding, and the western arch was rebuilt in 1675 and 1703. Hubbard records the poor quality of the reconstruction. The bridge is surfaced with modern tarmacadam and carries vehicular and pedestrian traffic. On his survey in 2003, Hubbard wrote that the bridge "remains free of the indignity of traffic lights", but noted that its camber, which prevents visibility along the whole length of the bridge, "exercised strict discipline on its modern users". The lack of visibility for users, and challenges for large vehicles entering and exiting the bridge, have led to repeated damage and in 2024 Conwy County Borough Council and the Welsh Government established a joint study to consider options for improvements.

== Architecture and description ==
The bridge has a span of 51 m (167 ft). It has three arches with two piers and is constructed of gritstone and Welsh slate rubble. Above the datestones set on either side of the bridge are carved coats of arms. That on the south side represents the House of Stuart and carries the initials CR. That on the north has the Prince of Wales's feathers and the initials CP. Pont Fawr is a Grade I listed building and a Scheduled monument. (Note: As often occurs for bridges, Pont Fawr has two listings, as it spans the border between two communities, Trefriw and Llanrwst. The second listing uses the Cadw identifier 16951.)

John Hilling described the bridge as "one of the finest stone bridges in Wales" and it has long been a favoured subject for artists. 18th century topographical studies frequently included engravings or illustrations of the bridge, such as Thomas Pennant's a Tour in Wales, published in 1788. John Laporte painted the bridge in 1800 and in the 19th century it was painted by Hugh Hughes.

== Gallery ==
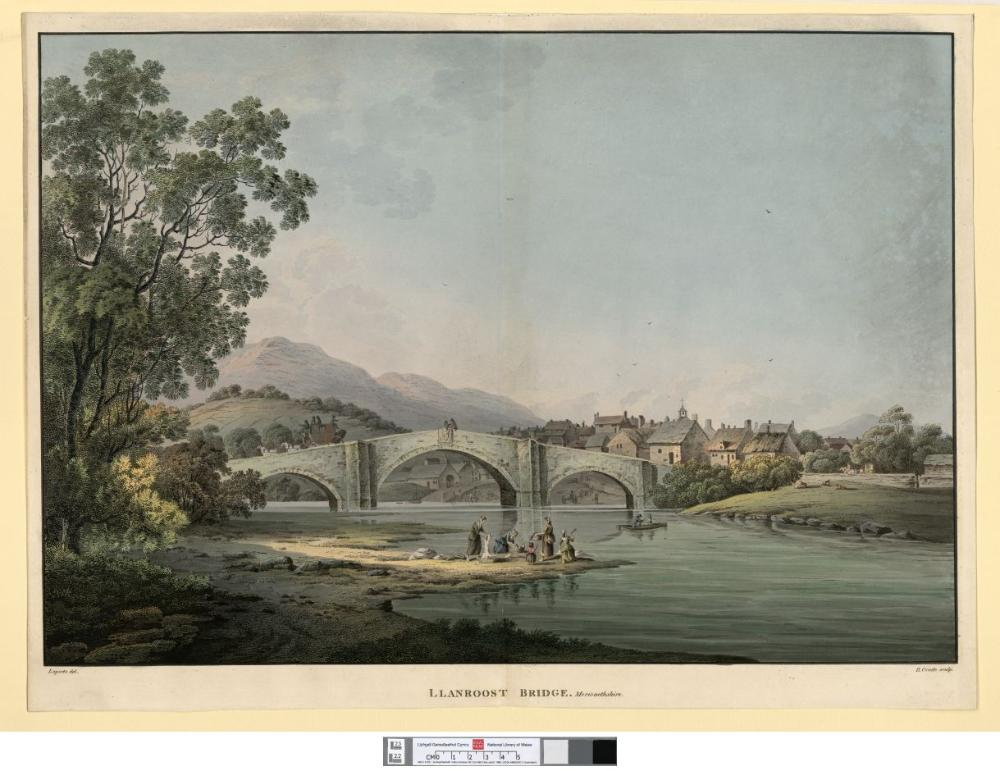
Watercolour of 1800 by John Laporte

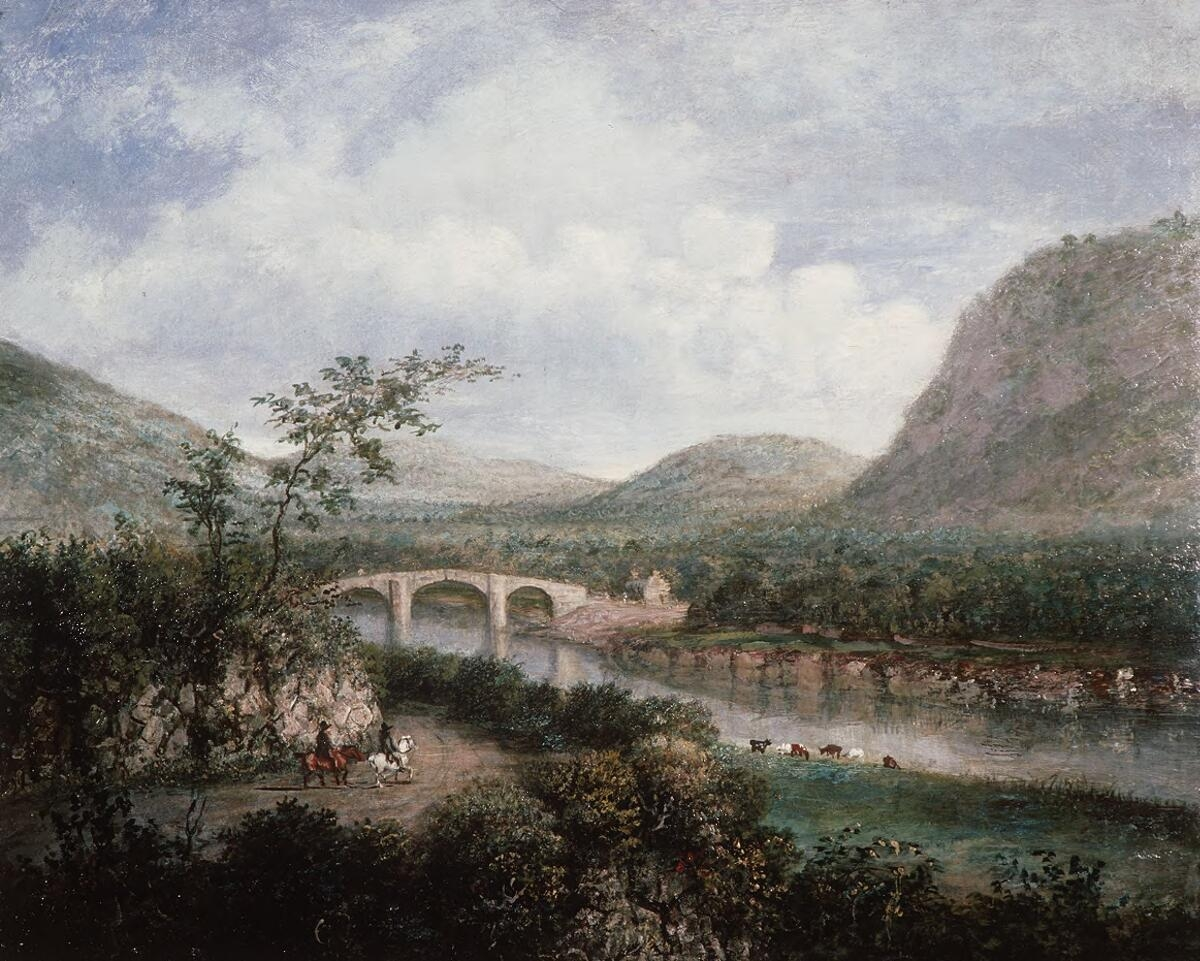
Painting of 1858 by Hugh Hughes

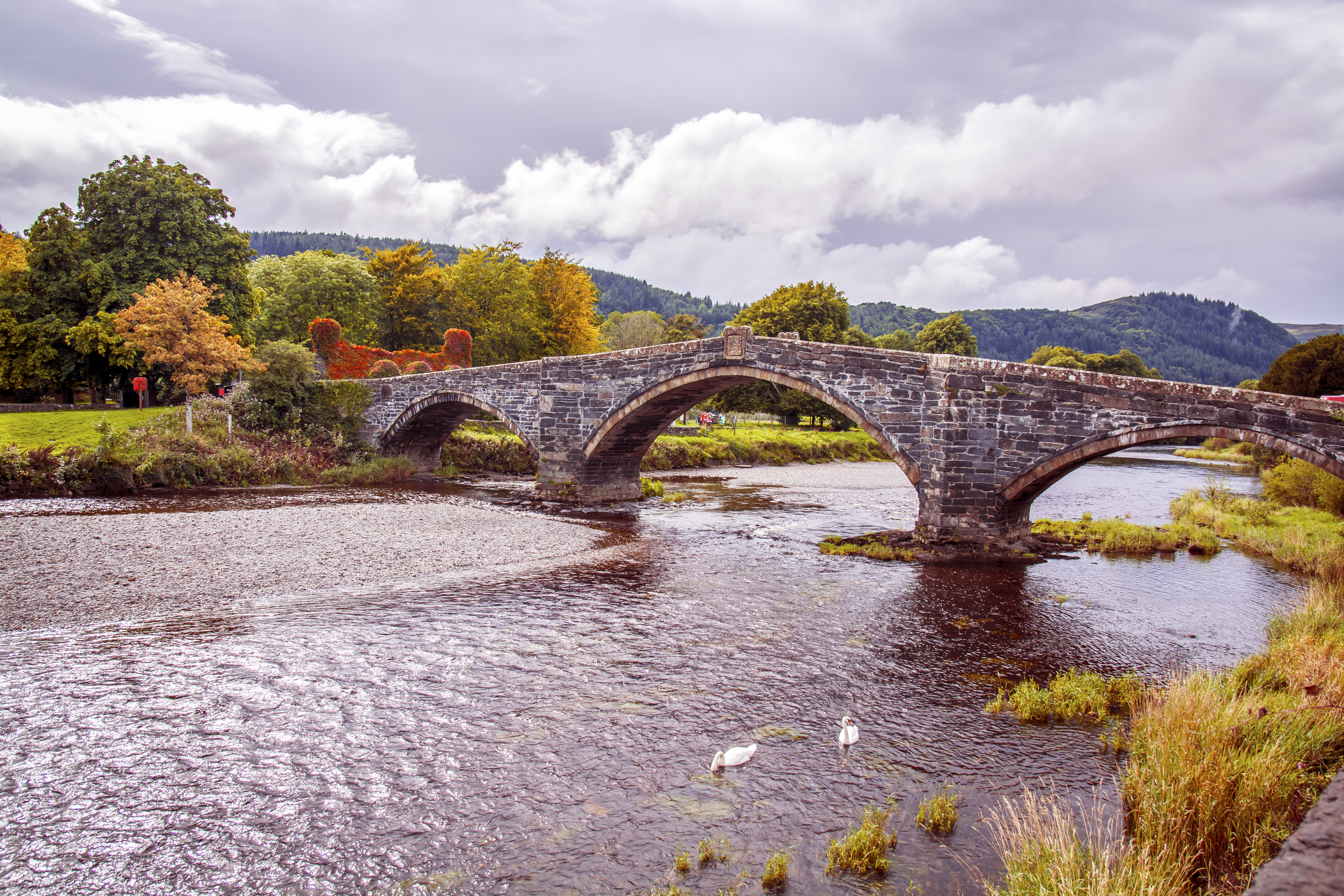
View of the bridge showing the central cartouches

== Sources ==
- Hilling, John B. (2018). The Architecture of Wales: From the First to the Twenty-first Century. Cardiff: University of Wales Press. ISBN 978-1-786-83284-9. OCLC 1034615762.
- Hubbard, Edward (2003). Clwyd: Denbighshire and Flintshire. The Buildings of Wales. New Haven and London: Yale University Press. ISBN 978-0-140-71052-6. OCLC 1052818155.
