= St Mary's Church, Llanrwst =

Demolished church in Llanrwst, Conwy County Borough, Wales

Coordinates: 53.1359°N 3.7930°W

St Mary's Church, Llanrwst was a church located in Betws Road, Llanrwst, Conwy, Wales. It was created and designed by Henry Kennedy during 1841 and 1842.

Intended for English speaking locals and tourists in the area, in 1874 and 1875, the Lancaster architects Paley and Austin tripled the size of the chancel, extending it eastward, and spent £925 (equal to £110,000 in 2023) to reseat the church. The money paid included stained glass by Ward and Hughes in two windows of the chancel. The church was later demolished, and its stone altar was relocated to the north aisle of St Grwst's Church at another area in the town. Only a portion of the church walls have survived.

== See also ==
- List of ecclesiastical works by Paley and Austin
