= Llanfair Talhaiarn =

Village and community in Conwy, Wales

Llanfair Talhaiarn: Welsh: Llanfair Talhaearn
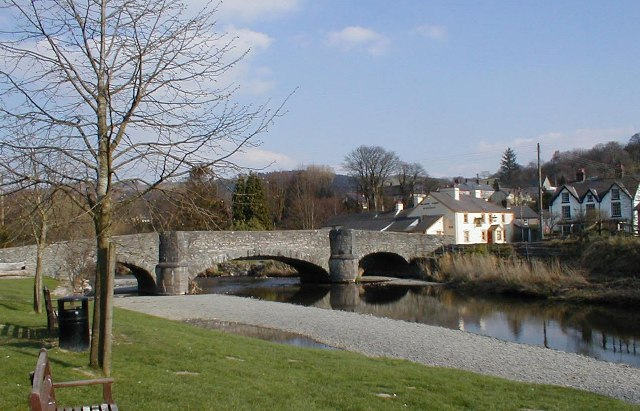
- The Afon Elwy at Llanfair Talhaiarn

- Location within Conwy
- Population: 1,070 (2011)
- OS grid reference: SH927700
- Community: Llanfair Talhaiarn
- Principal area: Conwy
- Preserved county: Clwyd
- Country: Wales
- Sovereign state: United Kingdom
- Post town: ABERGELE
- Postcode district: LL22
- Dialling code: 01745
- Police: North Wales
- Fire: North Wales
- Ambulance: Welsh
- UK Parliament: Bangor Aberconwy
- Senedd Cymru – Welsh Parliament: Clwyd West
- List of places UK Wales Conwy 53.216°N 3.607°W Map of the community

Llanfair Talhaiarn (Welsh: Llanfair Talhaearn), abbreviated to Llanfair TH, is a village and community approximately 5 miles (8.0 km) south of Abergele in Conwy county borough, Wales. Until 1974 it was included in Denbighshire. The population was 979 in 2001, increasing to 1,070 at the 2011 census with 44% being Welsh language speakers.

== History ==
The village derives its name from the church ("Llan") dedicated to Mary ("Mair", altered in this compound word to "Fair", hence "Llanfair"), that was founded by a monk called Talhaiarn from Valle Crucis Abbey (according to local legend). The original church has long disappeared.

The poet and architect John Jones (January 1810 – October 1869) was born at the Harp Inn (now known as Hafod y Gân) in Llanfair. He took the bardic name "Talhaiarn", and there is a popular misconception that this was the origin of the name of the village. However, the name of the village is documented long before Jones's birth.

=== Garthewin ===
The village was once part of the estate of Garthewin. The first written records of Garthewin date to the fourteenth century, but both that house and a later Jacobean house were replaced in the 18th century by the present building, which was subsequently altered in 1930 by Clough Williams-Ellis. It was from the 18th century until the late 20th the home of the Wynne family and notable for a private theatre constructed in the stables by R.O.F. Wynne which in the 1950s saw the first performances of several of Saunders Lewis's dramas. The theatre was designed by Thomas S. Tait. The house is a Grade II* listed building and its gardens and grounds are listed at Grade II on the Cadw/ICOMOS Register of Parks and Gardens of Special Historic Interest in Wales.

== Location ==
Llanfair is accessible from the Abergele to Llanrwst road via an ancient three arch bridge that spans the Elwy and leads directly into the heart of the village, where can be found two old pubs, The Black Lion and The Swan Inn. About 100 yards north of the old bridge is a more modern bridge that carries the main Abergele to Llansannan road across the river. Nearby is Mynydd Bodran, a 287 m (942 ft) hill which towers above the River Elwy. From the hill are fine views of Snowdonia and the North Wales coast. Other nearby hills include Moelfre Isaf and Moelfre Uchaf. The village is situated on the flood plain of the River Elwy (Afon Elwy). The community includes the hamlet of Moelfre, Conwy and Moelfre Path near Abergele Hospital.

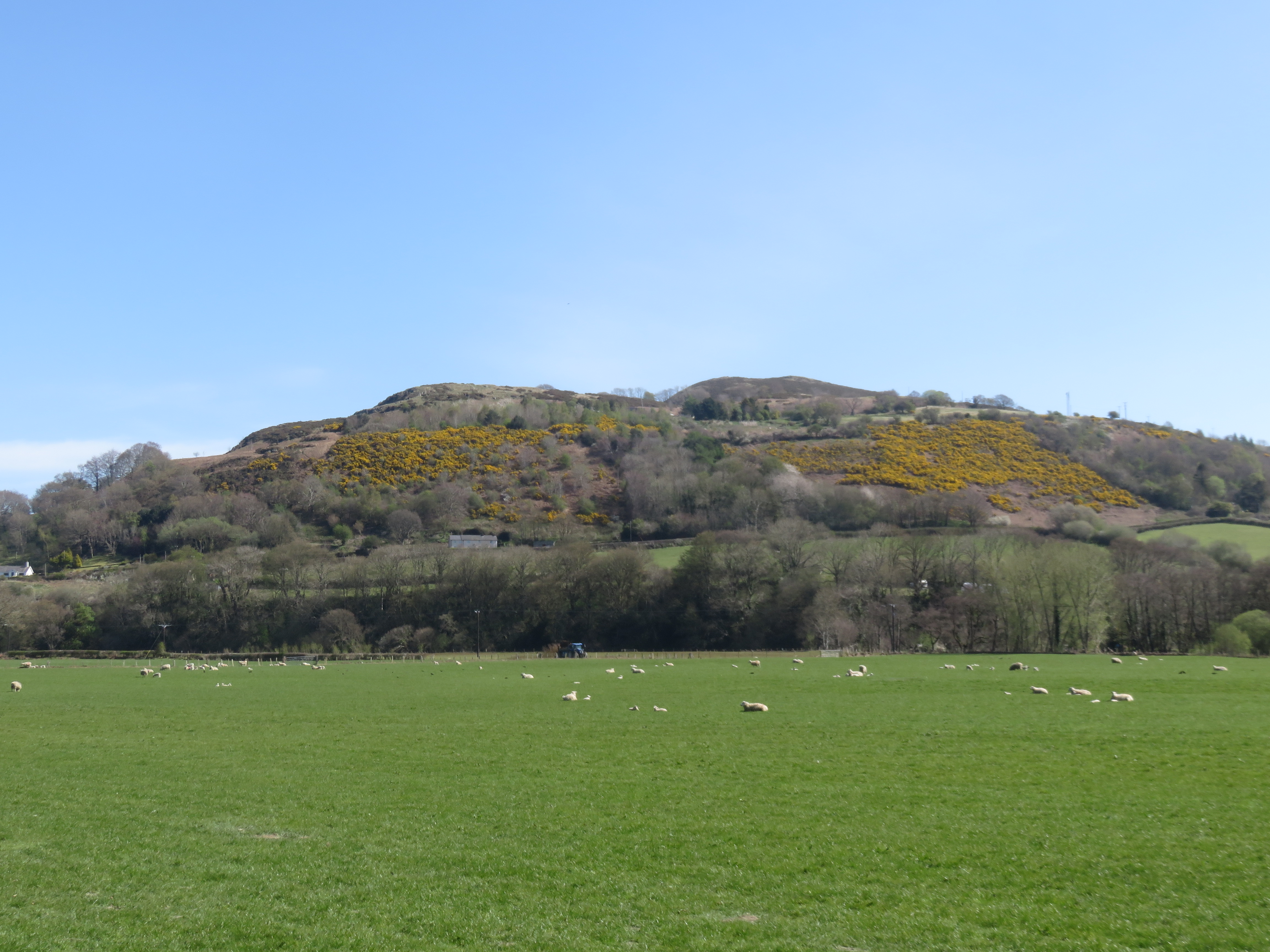
Mynydd Bodran
