= List of schools in Conwy County Borough =

This is a list of schools in Conwy County Borough in Wales.

== Primary schools ==
- Ysgol Awel y Mynydd
- Ysgol Babanod Glan Gele
- Ysgol Babanod Llanfairfechan
- Ysgol Babanod Mochdre
- Ysgol Babanod Penmaenrhos
- Ysgol Babanod T. Gwynn Jones
- Ysgol Babanod Y Foryd
- Ysgol Bendigaid William Davies
- Ysgol Betws-y-Coed
- Ysgol Betws-yn-Rhos
- Ysgol Bod Alaw
- Ysgol Bodafon
- Ysgol Bro Aled
- Ysgol Bro Cernyw
- Ysgol Bro Gwydir
- Ysgol Capel Garmon
- Ysgol Capelulo
- Ysgol Cerrigydrudion
- Ysgol Craig y Don
- Ysgol Cynfran
- Ysgol Cystennin
- Ysgol Deganwy
- Ysgol Dolwyddelan
- Ysgol Dyffryn yr Enfys
- Ysgol Eglwysbach
- Ysgol Ffordd Dyffryn
- Ysgol Glan Conwy
- Ysgol Glan Morfa
- Ysgol Glanwydden
- Ysgol Iau Hen Golwyn
- Ysgol Iau Sant Elfod
- Ysgol Llanddoged
- Ysgol Llanddulas
- Ysgol Llandrillo-yn-Rhos
- Ysgol Llangelynnin
- Ysgol Llangwm
- Ysgol Llannefydd
- Ysgol Llansansiôr
- Ysgol Maes Owen
- Ysgol Morfa Rhianedd
- Ysgol Nant y Groes
- Ysgol Pant y Rhedyn
- Ysgol Pen-y-Bryn
- Ysgol Pencae
- Ysgol Penmachno
- Ysgol Pentrefoelas
- Ysgol Porth-y-Felin
- Ysgol San Siôr
- Ysgol Sant Joseff
- Ysgol Swn y Don
- Ysgol Talhaiarn
- Ysgol Tudno
- Ysgol y Plas
- Ysgol Ysbyty Ifan

== Secondary schools ==
- Ysgol Aberconwy
- Ysgol Bryn Elian
- Ysgol Dyffryn Conwy
- Ysgol Eirias
- Ysgol Emrys Ap Iwan
- Ysgol John Bright
- Ysgol y Creuddyn

== Special schools ==
- Ysgol y Gogarth

== Independent schools ==
- Arnold House, Llanddulas (closed 1943)
- Rydal Penrhos
- St David's College, Llandudno
