= Betws yn Rhos =

Village in Conwy County Borough, Wales

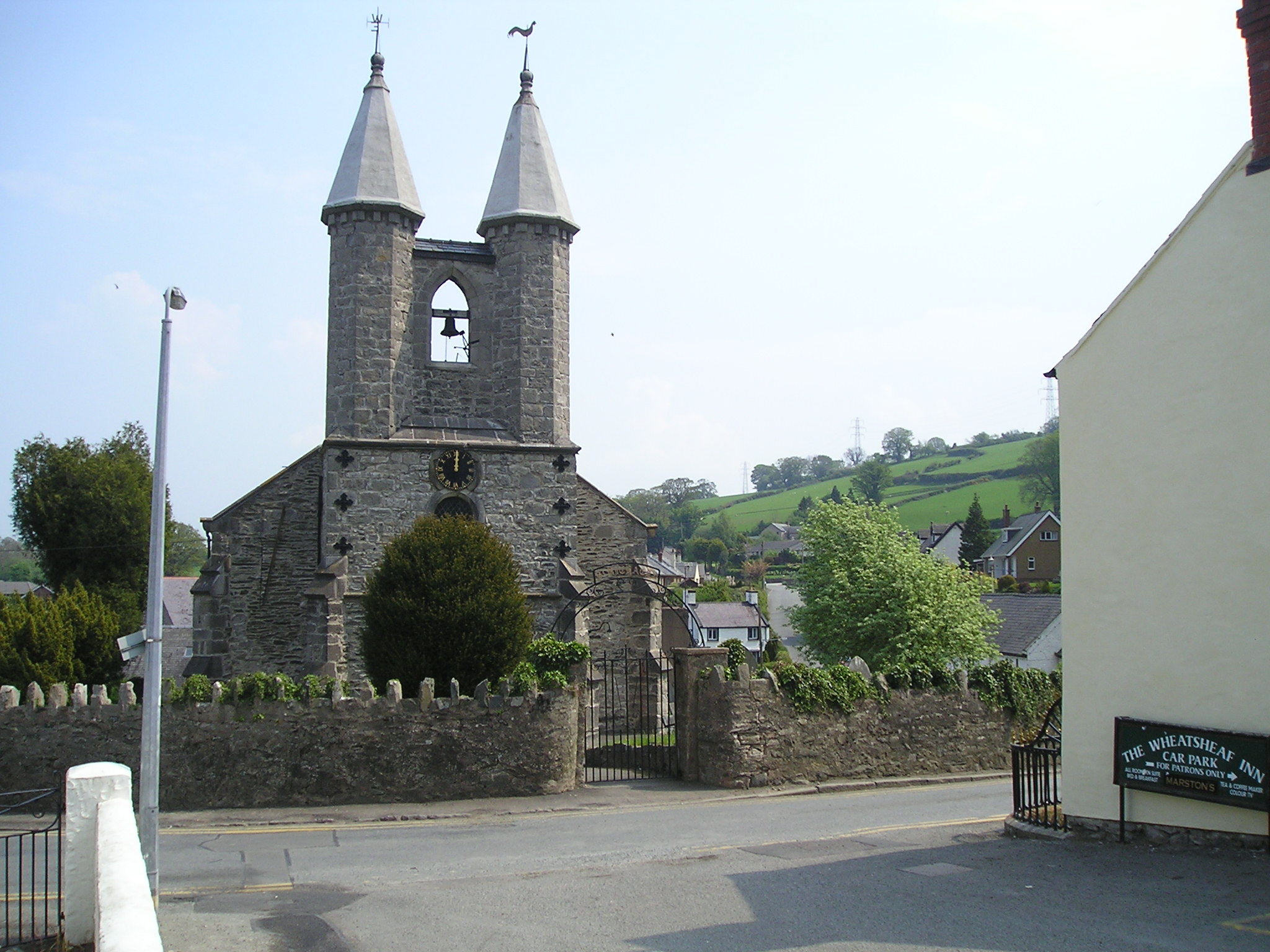
- Saint Michael's Church

- Location within Conwy
- Population: 1,052 (2011)
- OS grid reference: SH906735
- Community: Betws yn Rhos
- Principal area: Conwy
- Preserved county: Clwyd
- Country: Wales
- Sovereign state: United Kingdom
- Post town: ABERGELE
- Postcode district: LL22
- Post town: COLWYN BAY
- Postcode district: LL29
- Dialling code: 01745
- Police: North Wales
- Fire: North Wales
- Ambulance: Welsh
- UK Parliament: Bangor Aberconwy
- Senedd Cymru – Welsh Parliament: Clwyd West
- List of places UK Wales Conwy 53.247°N 3.639°W Map of the community

Betws yn Rhos (Welsh for 'chapel house in Rhos') is a village and community in Conwy County Borough, Wales.

Betws yn Rhos is located about 5 miles (8.0 km) inland between the coastal towns of Abergele and Colwyn Bay. Until 1974, it was part of Denbighshire, but subsequent local government reorganisations saw it administered as part of Clwyd from 1974 to 1996, before its current administration as part of Conwy County Borough. At the 2001 census the population was 944, increasing to 1,052 at the 2011 census.

The village itself only has a population of 312. The community includes the small settlements of Llanelian-yn-Rhos, Trofarth, Dolwen, Bryn-y-maen, and Dawn.

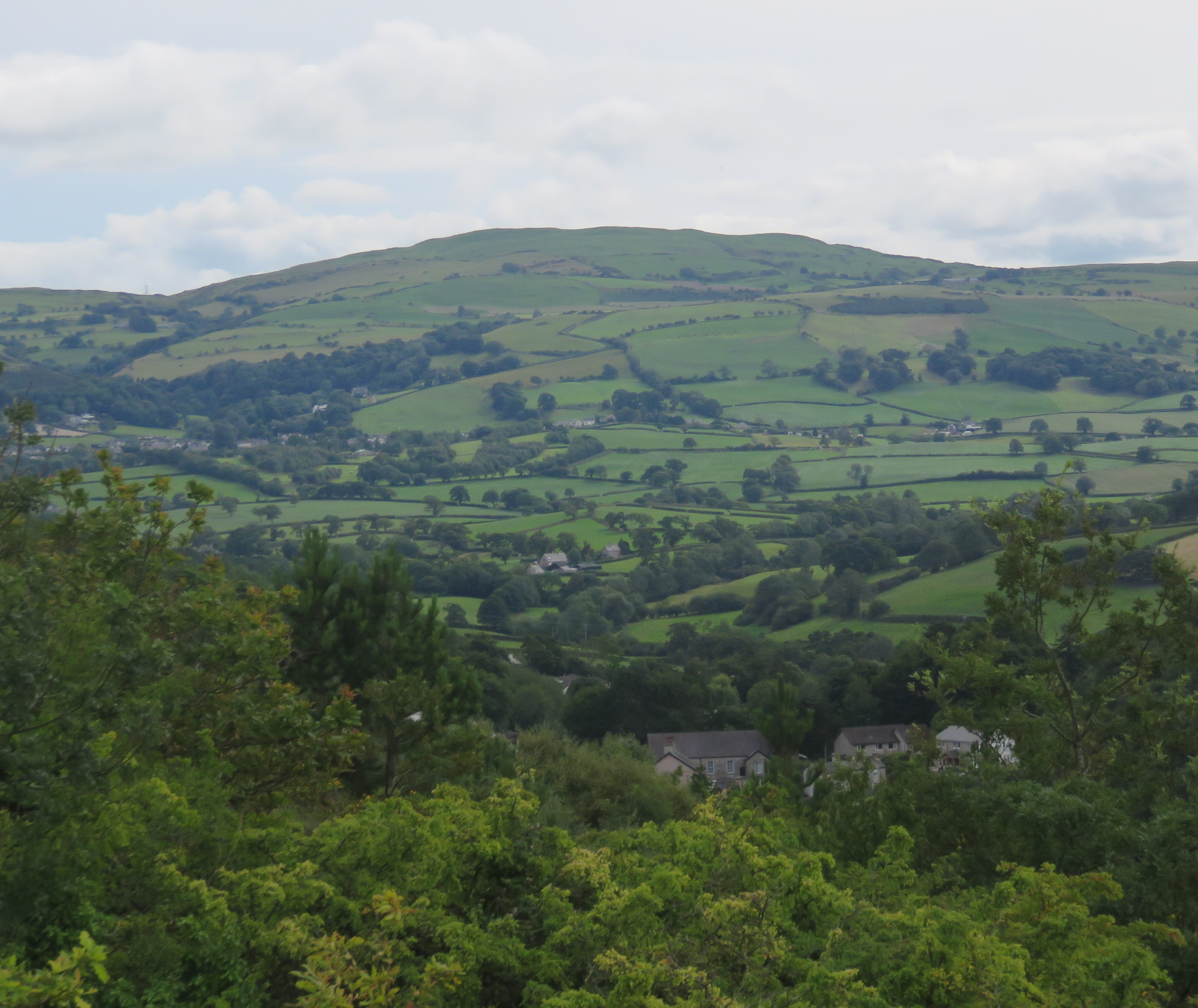
Moelfre Uchaf rises above Betws

== Etymology ==
The first part of the name of the village comes from the Middle English word bedhus, meaning "prayer house", which became betws in Welsh. Bettws Newydd translates therefore to the new prayer house.

== Sport ==
Betws yn Rhos is home to a football team that plays in the Clwyd Football League. Betws yn Rhos enjoyed a good first season 2007/08 but have since been unable to recapture their form in the 2008/09 In the summer of 2011, Craig Hughes took over Betws yn Rhos FC, to become their 4th manager in the last 5 seasons. In 2011/12 the boundaries also changed and Betws yn Rhos now play in the newly formed Clwyd/Conwy Division.

== Notable residents ==
- T. Gwynn Jones (1871–1949), poet, scholar and journalist, who was born at Y Gwyndy Uchaf
- Bruce Jones (born 1953), former Coronation Street actor who played Les Battersby

== Governance ==
An electoral ward in the same name exists. This ward stretches to Llanfair Talhaiarn and has a total population of 2,122.
