= Kinmel Bay =

Seaside village in Conwy County Borough, Wales

Coordinates: 53.310°N 3.519°W

Kinmel Bay: Welsh: Bae Cinmel
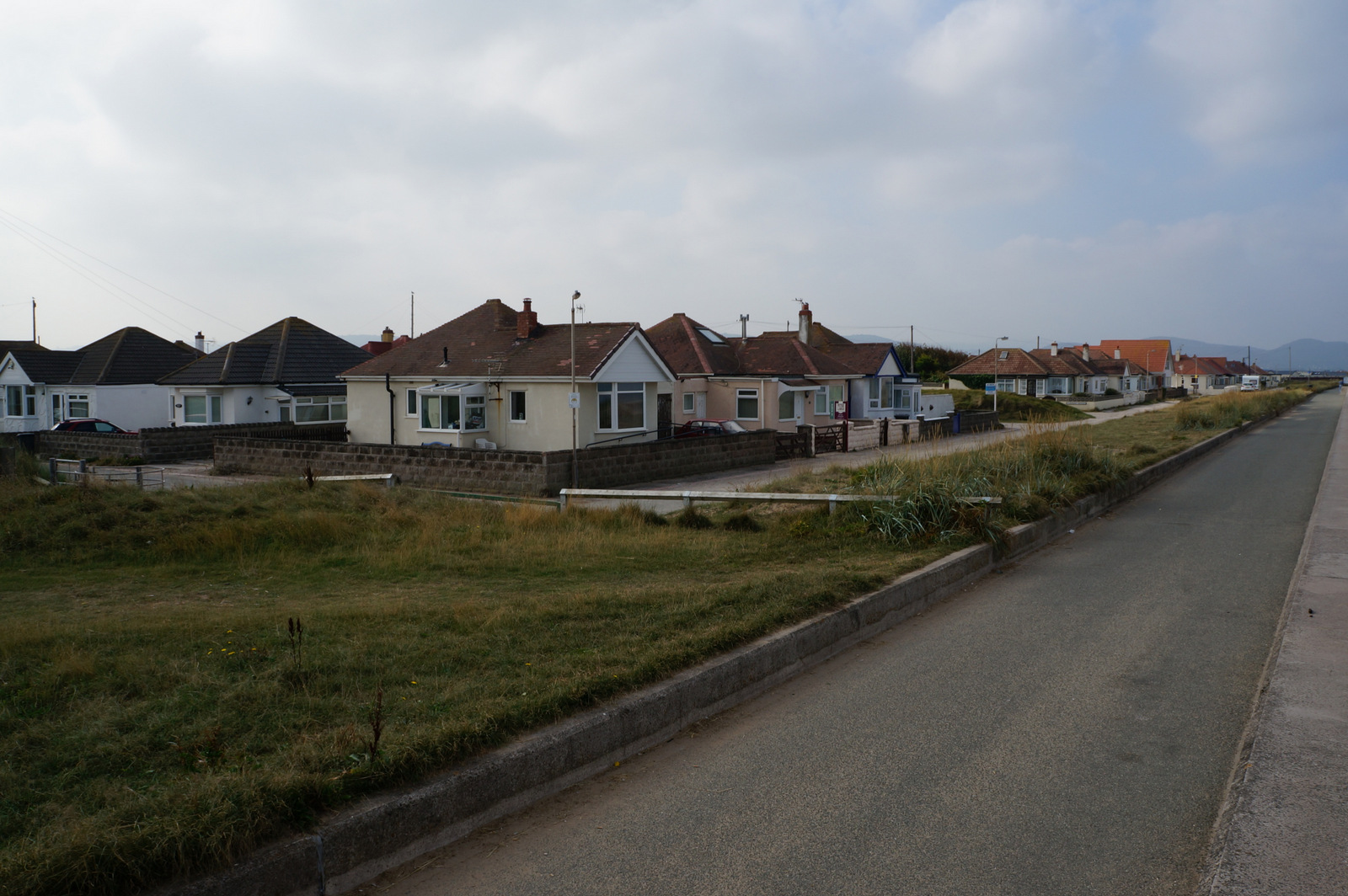
- Houses on the Promenade, Kinmel Bay

- Location within Conwy
- Population: 7,864 (including Towyn) (2001 Census)
- OS grid reference: SH988803
- Community: Kinmel Bay and Towyn
- Principal area: Conwy
- Country: Wales
- Sovereign state: United Kingdom
- Post town: RHYL
- Postcode district: LL18
- Dialling code: 01745
- Police: North Wales
- Fire: North Wales
- Ambulance: Welsh
- UK Parliament: Clwyd North
- Senedd Cymru – Welsh Parliament: Clwyd West

Kinmel Bay (Welsh: Bae Cinmel) is a large seaside town in Conwy County Borough, north-east Wales. It is also an electoral ward to the county council and town council. The resort town of Rhyl lies just across the River Clwyd in the neighbouring county of Denbighshire.

According to the 2001 Census, together with neighbouring Towyn (to the west), it had a population of 7,864, of which 10.7% could speak Welsh.

Kinmel Bay is part of a large urban area which includes Abergele, Bodelwyddan, Pensarn, Towyn, Rhyl and Prestatyn, These are also tourist areas for spring/summer self-catering holidaymakers which include various caravan sites.

According to early 19th Century texts, the etymology of 'Kinmel' derives from the Welsh name 'Cynmael' (Cyn-, a prefix which means 'former' and Mael which means 'Chief' or 'Prince').

Kinmel Bay was originally called Foryd before it grew in size, and that was the name of the former train station (see Foryd railway station). Kinmel Bay beach is popular with tourists and the local population. In addition to various small shops and takeaway outlets, there is also an Asda superstore that opened in 1981, and (as of 2016) includes a large petrol filling station.

Screenwriter/director Jimmy Sangster, known for his work on various Hammer horror films, was born in Kinmel Bay.

Kinmel Bay was the inspiration for the piece 'Vanishing Games', music written for oboe quartet by composer Peter McGarr.

== Governance ==
Kinmel Bay is also the name of an electoral ward which comprises the eastern half of the community of Kinmel Bay and Towyn. It elects three county councillors to Conwy County Borough Council. Since 2004 it has been represented by a mixture of Conservative and Independent councillors.

Kinmel Bay is also a community ward, electing town councillors to represent them on Towyn and Kinmel Bay Town Council.
