= Towyn =

Seaside resort in Conwy, Wales

Coordinates: 53.302°N 3.540°W

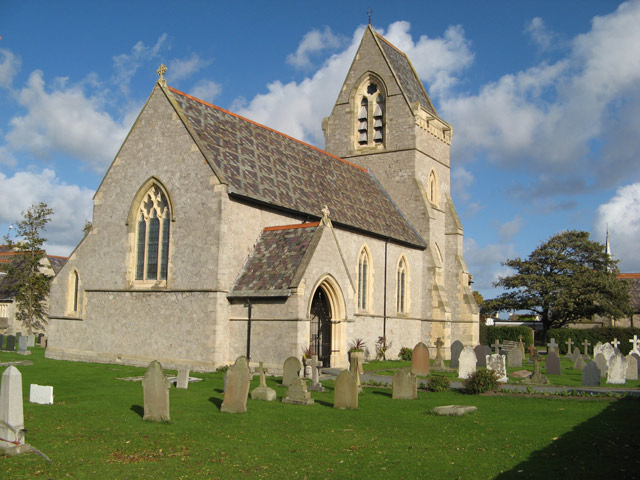
- St. Mary's church, Towyn

- Location within Conwy
- Population: 7,864 (including Kinmel Bay) (2001 Census)
- OS grid reference: SH974794
- Community: Kinmel Bay and Towyn
- Principal area: Conwy
- Country: Wales
- Sovereign state: United Kingdom
- Post town: ABERGELE
- Postcode district: LL22
- Dialling code: 01745
- Police: North Wales
- Fire: North Wales
- Ambulance: Welsh
- UK Parliament: Clwyd North
- Senedd Cymru – Welsh Parliament: Clwyd West

Towyn (sometimes in Welsh: Tywyn) is a seaside resort in the Conwy County Borough, Wales. It is also an electoral ward to the town and county councils.

== Location ==
It is located between Rhyl, in Denbighshire, and Abergele in Conwy.

== Name ==
The name Towyn is an alternative spelling of the Welsh word tywyn ('beach, seashore, sand-dune'). This place-name element is found in many other parts of Wales, most notably Tywyn in Gwynedd. Although the names are effectively identical and are pronounced the same, Towyn and Tywyn now use different spellings. Even so, they are still sometimes confused. The spelling Towyn reflects a slight variation in pronunciation that is heard in both places.

== Demography ==
According to the 2001 Census, together with neighbouring Kinmel Bay (to the east), it had a population 7,864, of which 10.7% could speak Welsh. Only a third of the population were born in Wales. Towyn itself had a population of 2,380 in the 2011 census.

== 1990 tidal floods ==
The town made national headlines in 1990 when a combination of gale-force winds, a high tide and rough seas caused Towyn's flood defences to be breached at about 11.00am on 26 February. 4 square miles (10 km^{2}) of land was flooded, affecting 2,800 properties and causing areas of the resort to be evacuated. Further flooding occurred later the same week, on 1 March, shortly after the site of the disaster was visited by Prince Charles and Princess Diana. Scientific experts also believe that the silt left behind from the flooding had left the town with a higher concentration of radioactivity, over ten times the governmental safety limits, most likely originating from the nuclear processing plant at Sellafield which had been dispersed into the Irish Sea over many years since its construction. The National Radiological Protection Board stated that there was a "small risk" to the people there, while the Welsh Office claimed there was no danger to the public. The coastal defences have since been reconstructed and significantly enhanced.

== Architecture ==
St. Mary's Church was designed by the renowned architect George Edmund Street, and was consecrated on 17 June 1873. It is known for the distinctive tiling on the roof. The same architect also designed the building which now houses the youth club in nearby Abergele.

== Economy ==
The principal economic activity in Towyn is tourism, concentrated in the summer season. A mix of static caravans and touring caravan pitches provides accommodation.

== Governance ==
Towyn is also the name of an electoral ward which comprises the western half of the community of Kinmel Bay and Towyn. It elects a county councillor to Conwy County Borough Council. It was represented by the Labour Party until June 2004, when the Conservative Party won the seat. At the May 2017 election the ward was won by an independent councillor.

Towyn is also a community ward, electing town councillors to represent it on Towyn and Kinmel Bay Town Council.
