= St Grwst's Church, Llanrwst =

Church in Conwy County Borough, Wales

Coordinates: 53.1381°N 3.7992°W

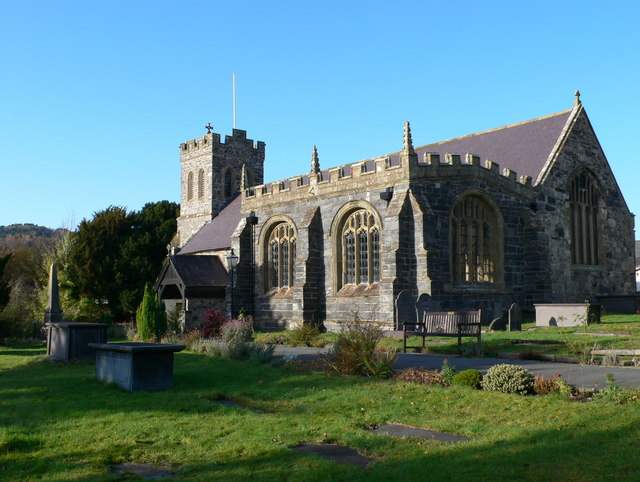
- St Grwst's Church with Gwydir Chapel in the foreground

- Location in Conwy
- Location: Church Street (Tan yr Eglwys), Llanrwst, Conwy
- Country: Wales
- Denomination: Church in Wales
- Website: St Grwst's Church

History
- Status: Parish church
- Founded: 1470
- Dedication: Saint Grwst

Architecture
- Functional status: Active
- Heritage designation: Grade I
- Designated: 19 February 1993
- Architect(s): Paley and Austin (1884 restoration and north aisle); Paterson Macaulay & Owens (2019 restoration and reordering)
- Architectural type: Church
- Style: Gothic, Gothic Revival

Specifications
- Capacity: 180
- Materials: Stone

Administration
- Diocese: St Asaph
- Archdeaconry: St Asaph
- Deanery: Aberconwy Mission Area
- Parish: Llanrwst

Clergy
- Priest: Fr Huw Bryant

St Grwst's Church, Llanrwst, is located in Church Street (Tan yr Eglwys), Llanrwst, Conwy, Wales. It is an active Church in Wales parish church and is part of the Aberconwy Mission Area in the archdeaconry of St Asaph, and the diocese of St Asaph. Its benefice is united with those of Llanddoged with Capel Garmon, Llansanffraid Glan Conwy, and Eglwysbach. The church is designated by Cadw as a Grade I listed building.

== History ==
The church was built in the late 15th century, possibly in the 1470s. The Gwydir Chapel was added in 1633–34 by Richard Wynn of Gwydir. The west tower was added in the early 19th century, replacing a bellcote. In 1884 the Lancaster architects Paley and Austin restored the church and added a north aisle. They also removed the west gallery, and reseated the church, increasing its capacity to 362. The cost of their work amounted to £2,300 (equivalent to £250,000 in 2025).

In 2019/2020 a major restoration and reordering project funded largely by the National Lottery Heritage Fund and designed by Paterson Macaulay and Owens Architects of Mold, saw a new mezzanine gallery, kitchen and toilet facilities installed. The project also included conservation work to Gwydir Chapel, artefacts such as the monumental brasses, stone plaques and restoration to the building fabric in general. Other works included a new limestone floor with underfloor heating, new lighting scheme and sound system. The church is now used for a variety of different events, as well as church services.

== Architecture ==
=== Exterior ===
St Grwst's is constructed in rubble stone with limestone dressings. Its architectural style is Perpendicular. The plan consists of a nave and chancel in a single range, a north aisle, a south porch, the Gwydir Chapel at the southeast corner, and a west tower. The tower is in three stages, with diagonal buttresses, and a castellated parapet. The Gwydir Chapel also has a castellated parapet. Both the chapel and the nave have four-light east windows.

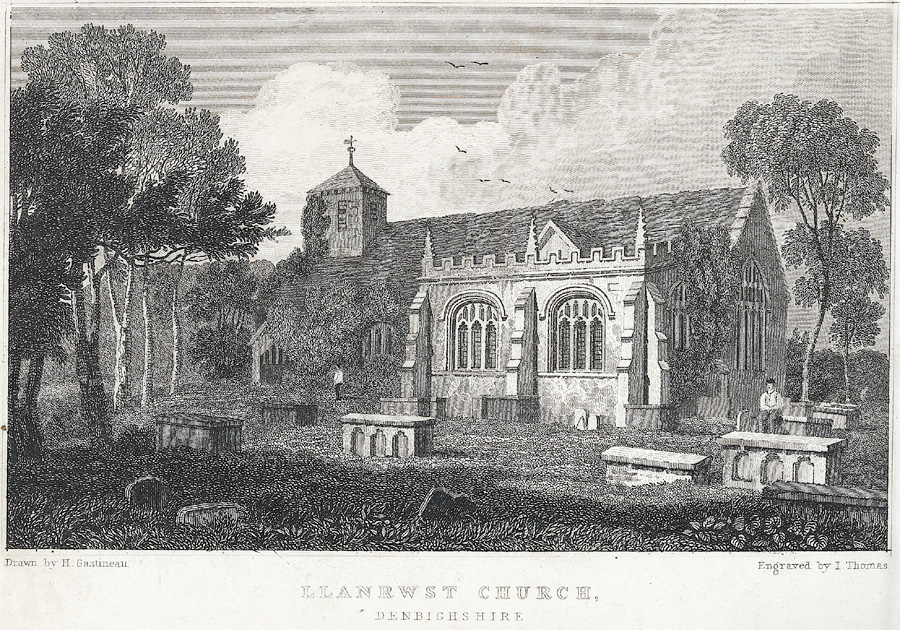
1830, Engraving

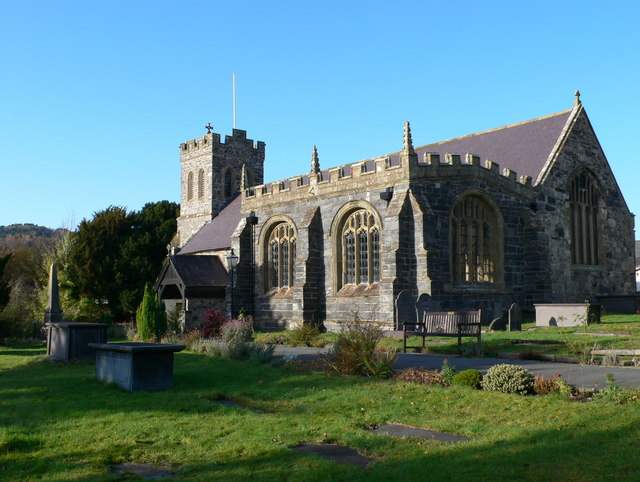
St Grwst 2007

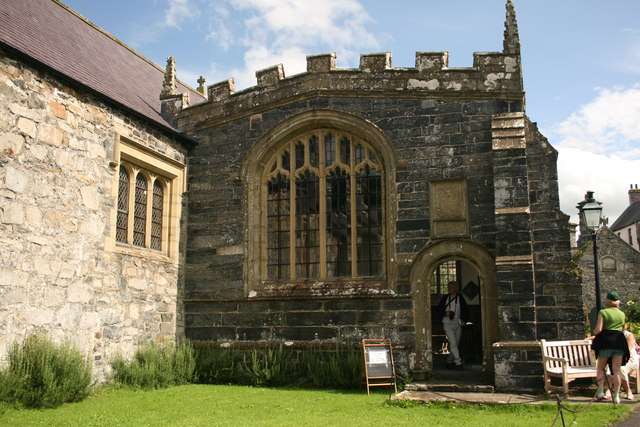
St Grwst 2007

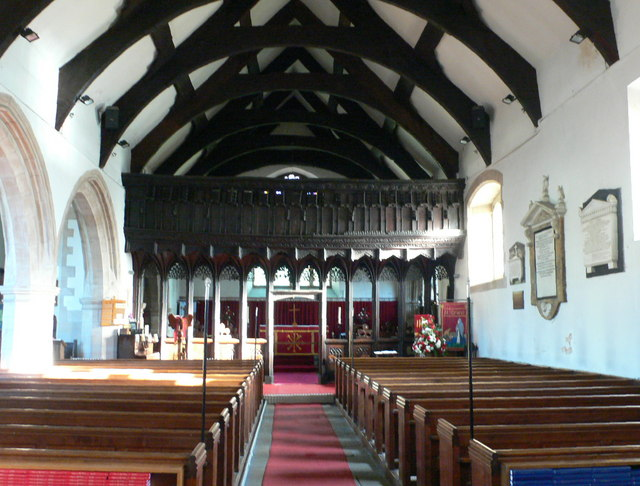
Interior before 2019 reordering

=== Interior ===
Inside the church is a north arcade of three bays, carried on octagonal piers. The rood screen is still present, and has retained its loft. It is considered to be one of the finest in Wales. It has twelve bays, with a central doorway. Its tracery is elaborately carved with a vine-trail rail, and depictions of such subjects as the Instruments of the Passion and pigs eating acorns. The font has a "bowl of weird organic forms". Also in the church are painted Royal arms dating from before 1801. The Gwydir Chapel contains 17th-century fittings and fixtures, including stalls, a lectern and a communion table. There are also numerous monuments and a 13th-century stone coffin said to be that of Llywelyn the Great and a fifteenth century knight's effigy, said to be Hywel Coetmore. The monuments, which date from about 1440 to the 17th century, include those of Sir John Wynn, who died in 1627, and other members of the Wynn family.

== See also ==
- List of ecclesiastical works by Paley and Austin
- St Mary's Church, Llanrwst
