= Moelfre Uchaf =

Hill in Conwy County Borough, Wales

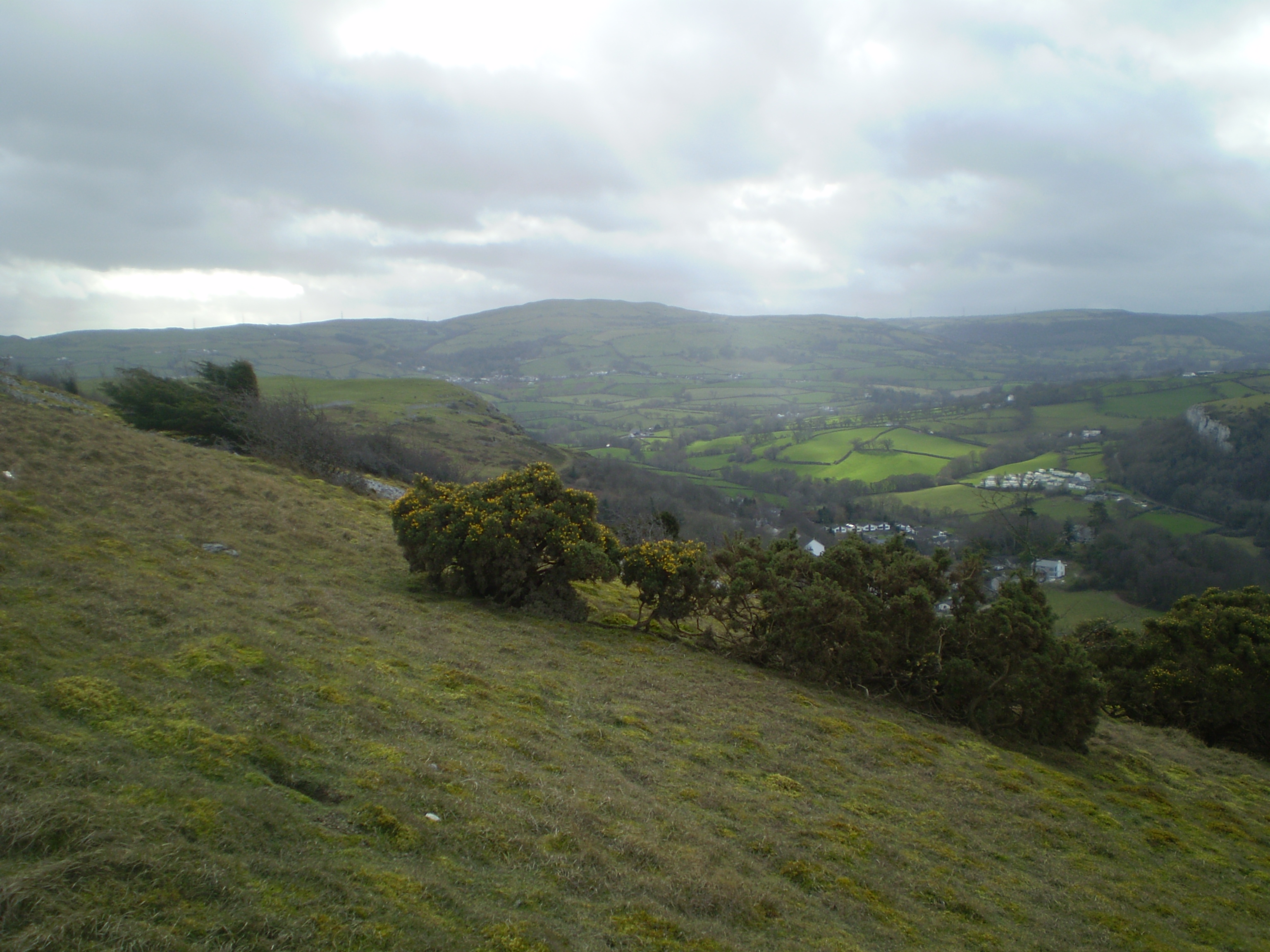
- Moelfre Uchaf from Cefn-yr-Ogof

Highest point
- Elevation: 396 m (1,299 ft)
- Prominence: 144 m (472 ft)
- Parent peak: Mwdwl-eithin
- Listing: Sub-Marilyn
- Coordinates: 53°13′48″N 3°39′08″W

Naming
- English translation: High bare hill
- Language of name: Welsh
- Pronunciation: Welsh: [ˈmoilvrɛ ˈɪxav]

Geography
- Country: Wales
- County Borough: Conwy
- Parent range: Denbigh Moors
- OS grid: SH898716

Moelfre Uchaf is a hill in Conwy County Borough, North Wales, 5 miles (8.0 km) south-east of Colwyn Bay and 1.5 mi (2.4 km) south-west of Betws-yn-Rhos. It is 396 m (1,299 ft) above sea level. A trigpoint is on the summit.

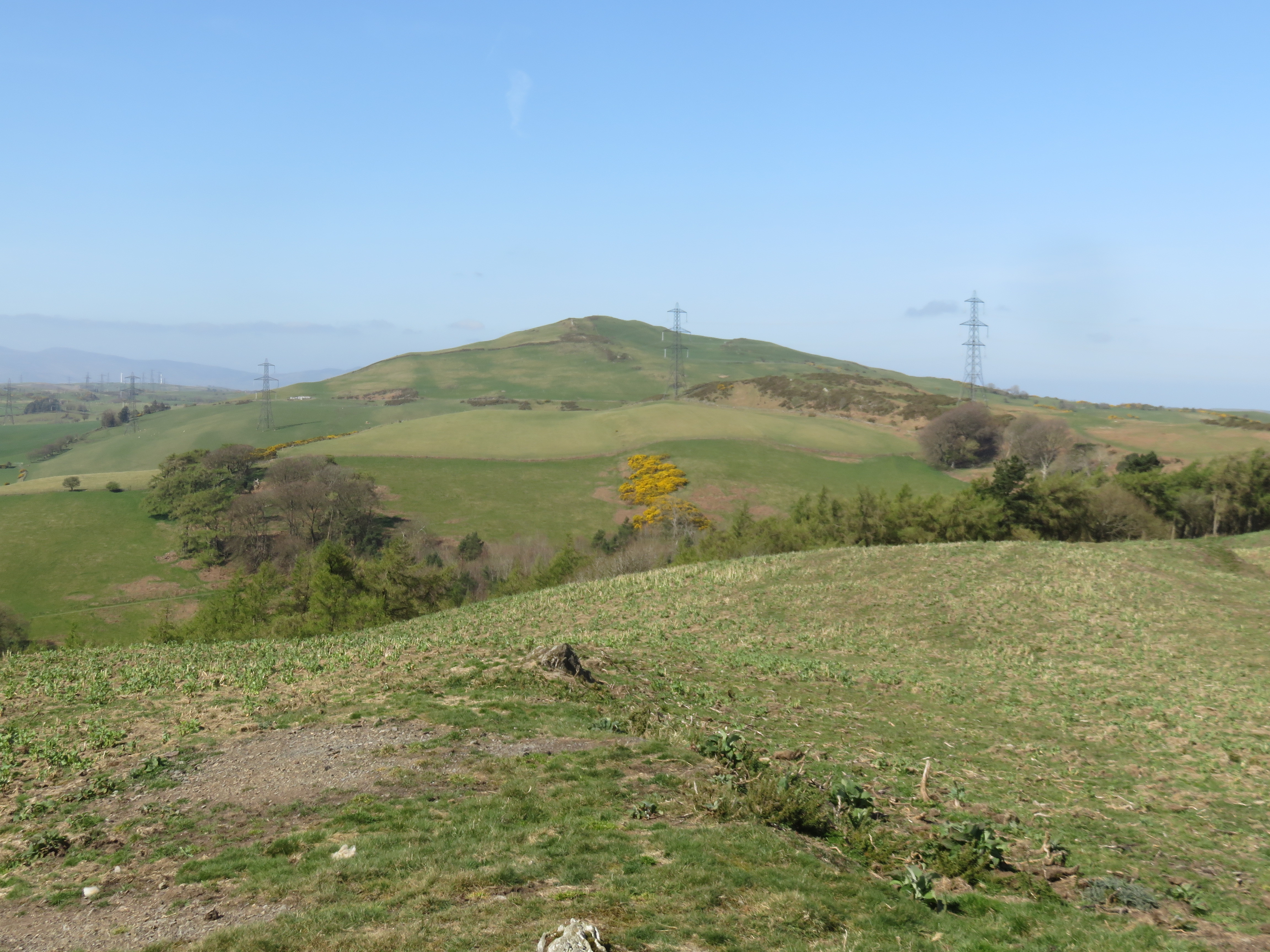
Moelfre Uchaf from Mynydd Dir
