= Llanrwst =

Market town in Conwy, Wales

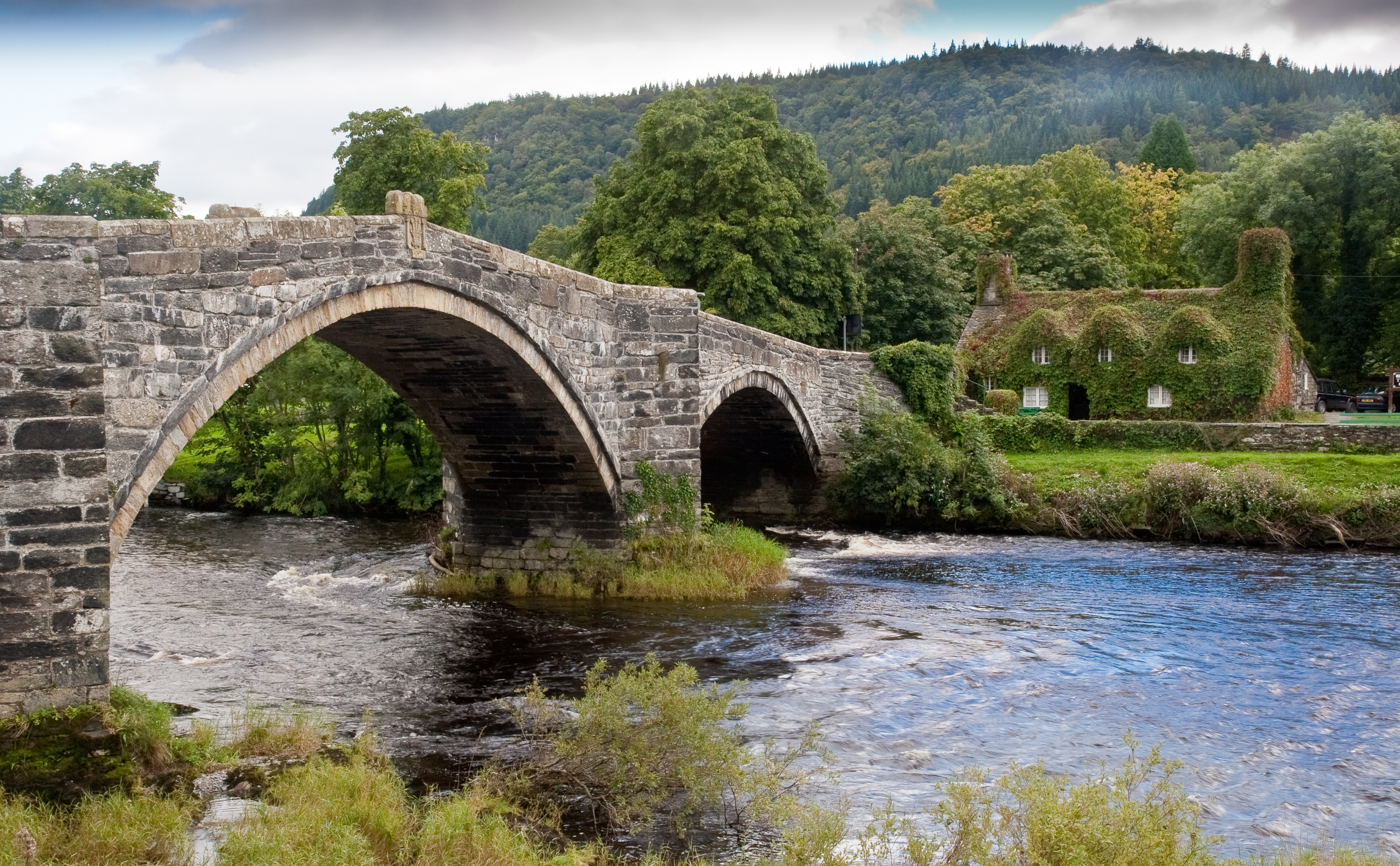
- Pont Fawr and Tu Hwnt i'r Bont

- Location within Conwy
- Area: 5.24 km^{2} (2.02 sq mi)
- Population: 3,128 (Community, 2021)
  - Density: 597/km^{2} (1,550/sq mi)
- OS grid reference: SH800615
- Community: Llanrwst
- Principal area: Conwy
- Preserved county: Clwyd
- Country: Wales
- Sovereign state: United Kingdom
- Post town: LLANRWST
- Postcode district: LL26
- Dialling code: 01492
- Police: North Wales
- Fire: North Wales
- Ambulance: Welsh
- UK Parliament: Bangor Aberconwy
- Senedd Cymru – Welsh Parliament: Bangor Conwy Môn
- List of places UK Wales Conwy 53.137°N 3.795°W Map of the community

Llanrwst (Welsh for 'church or parish of Saint Grwst'; Welsh pronunciation: [ɬanˈruːst]) is a market town and community in Conwy County Borough, Wales. It is on the east bank of the River Conwy and the A470 road, and lies within the historic county boundaries of Denbighshire. It developed around the wool trade and became known also for the making of harps and clocks. Today, less than one mile (two kilometres) from the edge of Snowdonia, its main industry is tourism. Notable buildings include almshouses, two 17th-century chapels, and the Parish Church of St Grwst, which holds the stone coffin of Llywelyn the Great. At the 2021 census, the community had a population of 3,128.

== History ==
Llanrwst takes its name from Saint Grwst, a 6th-century saint. The first church dedicated to him at Llanrwst was on a site now occupied by Seion Methodist Chapel, between Station Road and Cae Llan. A second church of St Grwst was built on a new site a short distance south of its predecessor, on the banks of the Conwy. The site was donated for the purpose in about 1170 by Rhun ap Nefydd Hardd, a member of the royal family of Gwynedd. The second church was replaced by the current building on the same site in the late 15th century.

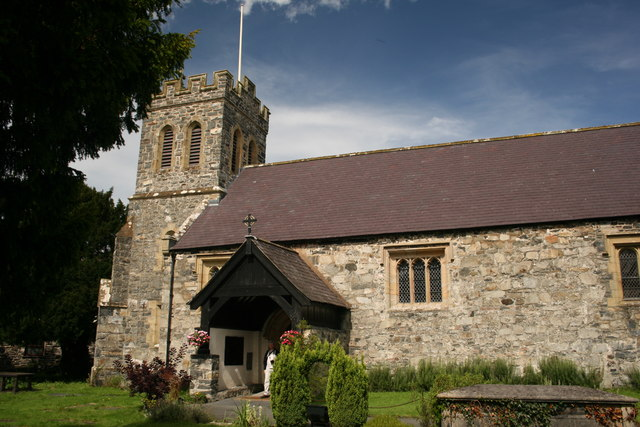
St Grwst's Church

Llanrwst developed around the wool trade, and for a long time the price of wool for the whole of Britain was set here. (Note: "Llanrwst is the principal mart for this article, and is attended by the English buyers: the price obtained for the wool at this fair is usually the standard for the year.") The growth of the village in the 13th century was considerably aided by an edict by Edward I of England (who built Conwy Castle) prohibiting any Welshman from trading within 10 miles (16 km) of the town of Conwy. Llanrwst, located some 13 miles (21 km) from that town, was strategically placed to benefit from this.

During the 13th century wars between the Welsh and English rulers, Llanrwst was for a time a border town, with the River Conwy serving as a boundary between English and Welsh rule in the 1240s and 1250s, and again in the 1270s and 1280s. The town's ambiguous status during this time gave rise to the local saying "Cymru, Lloegr a Llanrwst" (Wales, England and Llanrwst). The saying was used as the title of a 1989 song by local band, Y Cyrff.

The parish was also contested between different ecclesiastical jurisdictions; whilst the Conwy was generally the boundary between the dioceses of Bangor and St Asaph, the parish of Llanrwst straddled the river. In 1276, Llywelyn ap Gruffudd, Prince of Wales, claimed the whole parish for the Bangor diocese as part of trying to assert Welsh rule over the area. This was disputed by the bishop of St Asaph, who appealed to the Archbishop of Canterbury and the Pope. Matters resolved after Llywelyn's death in 1282 and the subsequent conquest of the Welsh territories by the English crown. The parish of Llanrwst was thereafter allowed to straddle the two dioceses, with the part east of the Conwy (including the town and parish church) being in the diocese of St Asaph, and the part west of the Conwy (including Gwydir Forest) being in the diocese of Bangor.

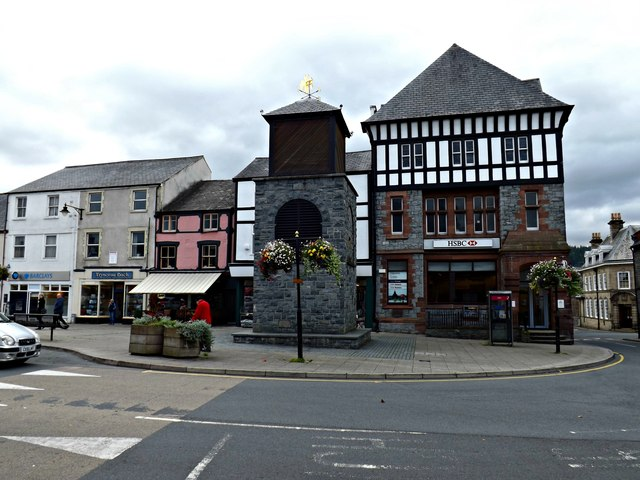
Ancaster Square in the town centre

In a survey in 1334, Llanrwst was described as one of three boroughs in the Lordship of Denbigh, with the others being Denbigh and Abergele. Boroughs were towns with certain trading rights and judicial powers. Some boroughs were subordinate only to the monarch rather than any intervening lord of the manor; these were sometimes termed 'free boroughs', and included places such as Caernarfon and Conwy. Modern writers sometimes claim that Llanrwst was a free borough. The origins and extent of Llanrwst's claim to borough status are unclear, but it appears to have been already in decline by the time of the 1334 survey, and Llanrwst's borough status did not endure.

In 1610 Sir John Wynn of Gwydir had the historic Llanrwst Almshouses built to house poor people of the parish. These closed in 1976, but were restored in 1996 with the aid of Heritage Lottery funding, reopening as a museum of local history and community focal point. It held a collection of over 100 items relating largely to the rural Conwy valley, and a number associated with the renowned Llanrwst Bards of the late 19th century. It closed as a museum in 2011.

The Grade I-listed Pont Fawr, a narrow, three-arched stone bridge said to have been designed by Inigo Jones, was built in 1636 by Sir Richard Wynn (son of Sir John Wynn) of Gwydir Castle. It links the town with Gwydir, a manor house dating from 1492, a 15th-century courthouse known as Tu Hwnt i'r Bont, and a road from nearby Trefriw. North of the village is the site of a house, Plas Madoc, which was the home of Colonel John Higson. A friend of Henry Pochin of Bodnant, Higson developed a garden at Plas Madoc which may have had input from, or been influenced by, Henry Ernest Milner. The house has been demolished but the garden remain and are listed at Grade II on the Cadw/ICOMOS Register of Parks and Gardens of Special Historic Interest in Wales.

Llanrwst hosted the National Eisteddfod in 1951, 1989 and 2019.

It is sometimes said that Llanrwst sought to join the United Nations in 1946 or 1947 as an independent state. No contemporary evidence confirming such a bid has been found. The earliest published version found of the story is a mention in a newspaper article from 1992, which gave no dates or further detail, but mentioned that Llanrwst "once discussed applying for membership of the United Nations". Various versions of the claim have been made since 1992. At the 2019 Eisteddfod, a local arts group handed out mock passports for the "Free Borough of Llanrwst" to visitors.

== Geography ==
Llanrwst from the air during December 2015 flooding of the Conwy valley

Llanrwst lies between 10 and 50 metres (33 and 160 ft) above sea level on the eastern bank of the River Conwy. The A470 trunk route between North and South Wales runs through the town, joined by the A548 main road from Rhyl, Prestatyn and Chester. To the south-west is Gwydir Forest. On the hills above is Moel Maelogan wind farm; the power generated by its turbines is fed to the town sub-station.

In 1830 the local doctor and naturalist John Williams published a work Faunula Grustensis ('Plants of Grwst') which described the fauna, geography and pathologies in and around Llanrwst.

== Governance ==
There are two tiers of local government covering Llanrwst, at community (town) and county borough level: Llanrwst Town Council (Cyngor Tref Llanrwst) and Conwy County Borough Council (Cyngor Bwrdeistref Sirol Conwy). The town council is based at 19 Ancaster Square in the town centre.

=== Administrative history ===
Llanrwst was an ancient parish. The parish historically straddled the River Conwy, which formed the boundary between the cantrefi of Arllechwedd to the west and Rhos to the east. Under the Statute of Rhuddlan in 1284, Arllechwedd became part of the county of Caernarfonshire and Rhos became part of the marcher lordship of Denbighland. Denbighland subsequently became part of Denbighshire from that county's creation in 1536. The parish of Llanrwst continued to straddle the two counties until the 19th century, with the part in Caernarfonshire being known as the township of Gwydir (sometimes also called Trewydir).

From the 17th century onwards, parishes were gradually given various civil functions under the poor laws, in addition to their original ecclesiastical functions. In some cases, the civil functions were exercised by subdivisions of the parish rather than the parish as a whole. In the case of Llanwrst, the parish was split into two parts for administering the poor laws: the Caernarfonshire township of Gwydir, and the rest of the parish in Denbighshire. In 1866, the legal definition of 'parish' was changed to be the areas used for administering the poor laws, and so Gwydir and Llanrwst became separate civil parishes. The civil parish of Gwydir or Trewydir was subsequently abolished in 1905, being absorbed into the neighbouring parish of Llanrhychwyn.

When elected parish and district councils were established in 1894, Llanrwst was given a parish council and included in the Llanrwst Rural District. In 1897 part of the parish was converted into an urban district. The remainder of the old parish outside the urban district became a separate parish called Llanrwst Rural. Llanrwst Urban District was abolished in 1974 and its area became a community instead. District-level functions passed to Aberconwy Borough Council, which was in turn replaced in 1996 by Conwy County Borough Council. The Llanrwst Rural parish also became a community in 1974; it was reorganised into a community called Bro Garmon in 1983.

== Demography ==
In the 2011 census the town population was put at 3,323, 61 per cent being Welsh speakers. At one time Llanrwst was the Wales's eighth largest town, with a higher population than Cardiff. (Note: "In 1801 the pop. [of Cardiff] was only 1018; in 1841 it was 10,077...") The change in the town population in the 19th and 20th centuries appears in the chart below.

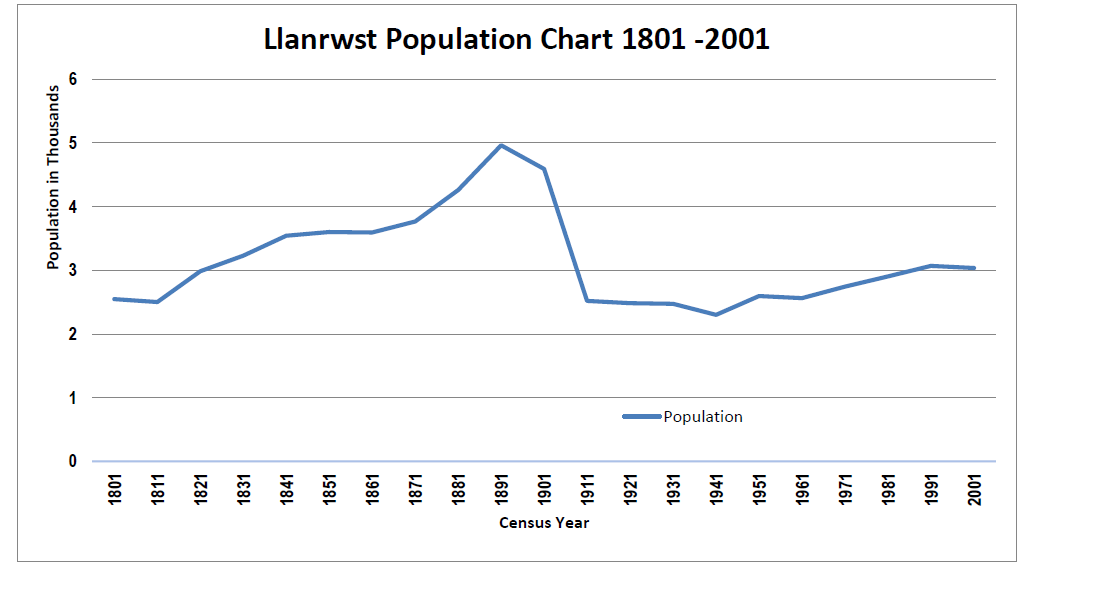
Llanrwst population graph 1801–2001

== Transport ==
Llanrwst has two railway stations, Llanrwst and North Llanrwst, on the Conwy Valley Line, which terminated here before being extended to Betws-y-Coed in 1867 and Blaenau Ffestiniog in 1879. It was originally envisaged that the railway would pass closer to the river, on the site of today's Central Garage. The Victoria Hotel was built opposite the bridge in anticipation of this. Had the line been built on the west bank of the River Conwy, as originally planned, to serve the inland port of Trefriw across the river from Llanrwst, it is unlikely that Llanrwst would have gained its present status.

== Education ==
Ysgol Dyffryn Conwy, previously Llanrwst Grammar School, is a bilingual secondary school with about 790 pupils. According to the latest inspection report by Estyn, it has a GCSE pass rate of 71 per cent (based on five GCSEs, grades A–C), putting the school in equal 24th place, just outside the top 10 per cent of secondary schools in Wales. It is also the second best-performing secondary school in Conwy, behind Eirias High School in Colwyn Bay.

There is a Christian-based youth club in Seion Chapel called Clwb Cyfeillion.

== Sport ==
Llanrwst hosts Llanrwst United FC, with two senior teams. The first plays in the Welsh Alliance League and the reserves in Clwyd League Division 2. The club has a junior section of eight teams, playing in the Aberconwy and Colwyn League. Llanrwst Cricket Club plays in the North Wales Premier Cricket League. Since 2012, there has been an annual half marathon round the town.

The third stage of the Tour of Britain Women's cycle race passed through Llanrwst in 2026.

== Notable people ==
In birth order:

- Evan Owen Allen (1805–1852), Welsh-language journalist and poet, born at Pant-y-llin, near Llanrwst
- Peter Thomas, Baron Thomas of Gwydir (1920–2008), Welsh politician, born in Llanrwst, a former Secretary of State for Wales
- Mark Roberts (born 1967) of Catatonia and its predecessor Y Cyrff, known for the song Cymru, Lloegr a Llanrwst
- Kai Owen (born 1975), actor notable as Rhys Williams in Torchwood
- Daniel Andreas San Diego (born 1978), an FBI most wanted criminal captured in November 2024, living at Llanrwst, near Maenan.
- Glyn Wise (born 1988), runner-up as a Big Brother 7 contestant in 2006; attended Ysgol Dyffryn Conwy.
- Erin Mai (born 2005 or 2006), Wales's representative at the 2019 edition of the Junior Eurovision Song Contest with "Calon yn Curo (Heart Beating)" after her victory at the S4C show Chwilio am Seren

== See also ==
- Llanrwst Rural District
- Free Borough of Llanrwst
