= Saint Grwst =

Welsh saint

Confessor
- Born: 6th century possibly in Rheged or Gwynedd
- Died: 7th century
- Venerated in: Anglican Communion; Eastern Orthodox Church
- Feast: 1 December
- Patronage: Llanrwst, Wales

Saint Grwst the Confessor (also known as Gwrwst, Gwrst, Gorwst or Gorst ap Gwaith Hengaer) was a 6th and 7th century saint operating in the Welsh Kingdom of Gwynedd.

== Family ==
Grwst was the son of Gwaith Hengaer ap Elffin, a Prince of Rheged, thought to be centred on modern day Cumbria, and Euronwy ferch Clydno Eiddin, a Princess of Din Eiddin (Edinburgh) in Lothian, making him the great-grandson of King Urien Rheged.

== Hagiographic life ==
He may have arrived in Wales in the c.540s at the instigation of King Maelgwn Gwynedd, who granted charters for Christian missionaries, like Grwst, Kentigern and Trillo to set up their individual cells across his kingdom, where he earned the honoured title of Grwst yr Cyfaddefiadwr (Grwst the Confessor). He is said to have witnessed a grant by Maelgwn Gwynedd to St Kentigern, where his signature "Sanctus Gwrwst" lies alongside those of Saints Deiniol and Trillo. However, these dates and events are a little at odds with the genealogies (Iolo Morganwg Welsh MSS. 529), which would put Grwst's generation in the early 7th century, in the c.600s to 630s.

== Veneration ==
He was the reputed founder of Llanrwst and his festival, known as Gwyl Rwst, is held on 1 December. The site of Grwst's original cell or Llan is now occupied by the Seion Methodist Chapel in Llanrwst, with the nearby Cae Llan housing estate the location of the first church dedicated to him by the 11th century. An annual fair was held on these grounds during the 16th century to celebrate the saint's feast day, with the area known as Gwgrwstw after him.
