= Conwy County Borough =

County borough in Wales

Conwy County Borough Bwrdeistref Sirol Conwy (Welsh)
- County borough
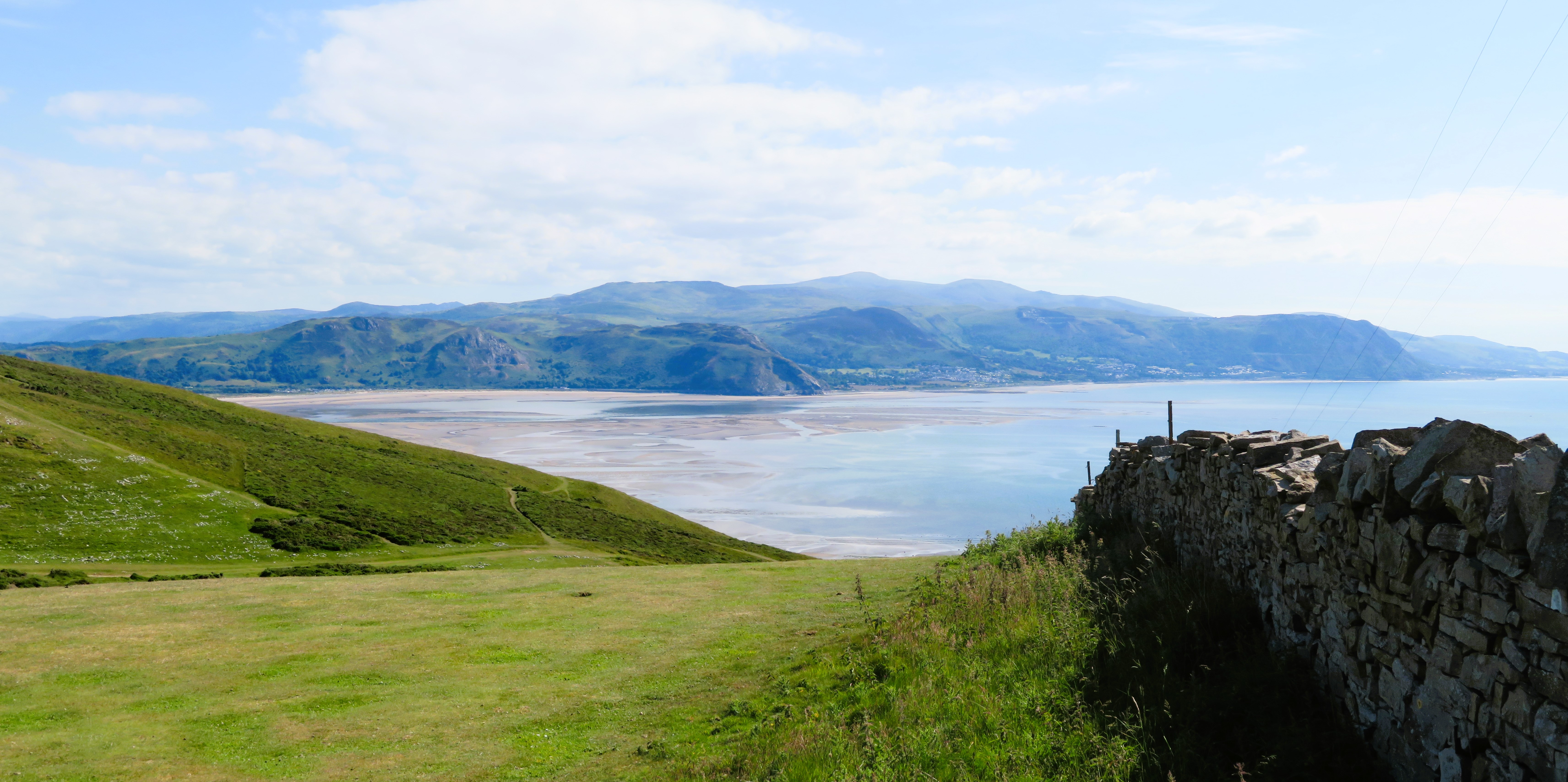
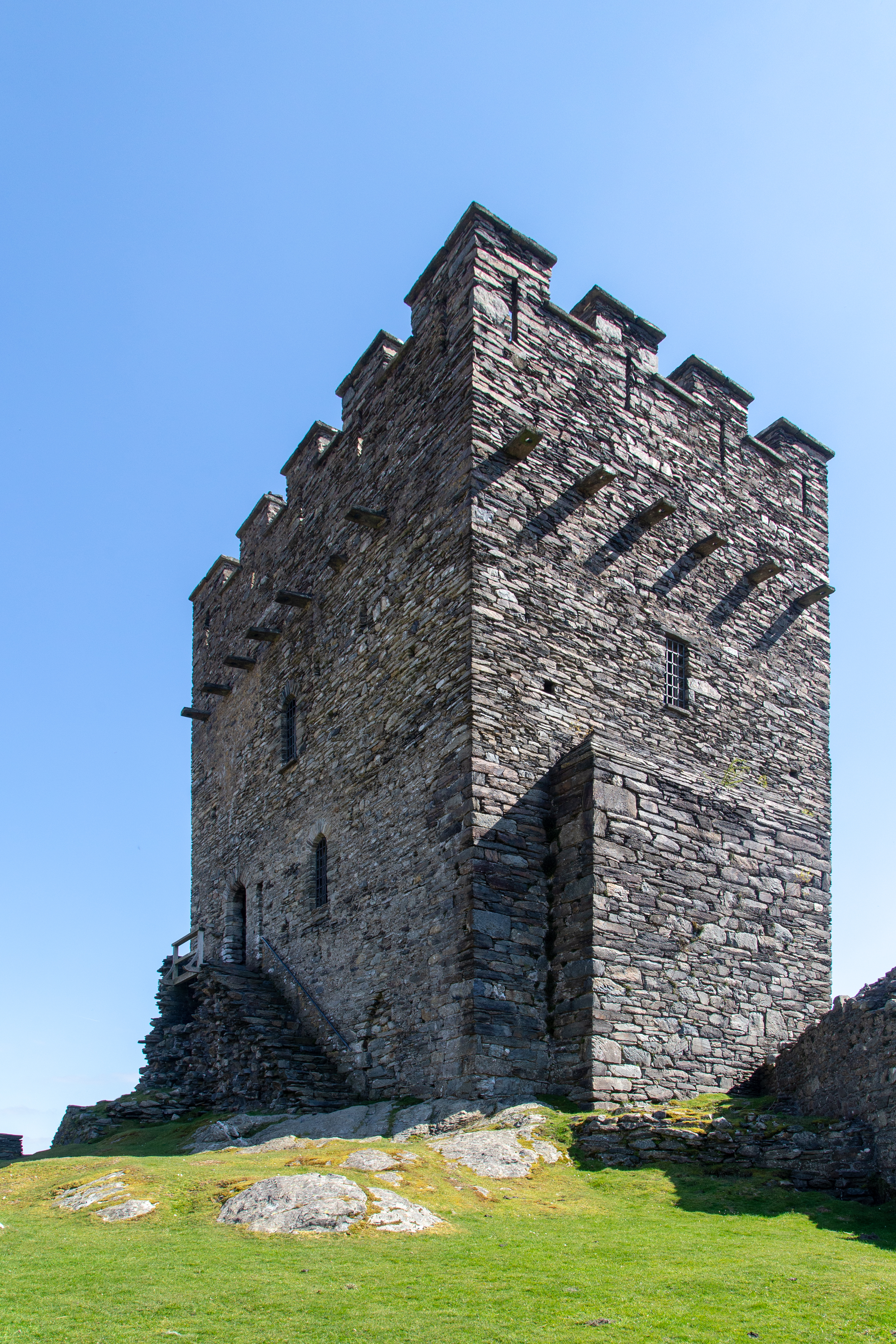
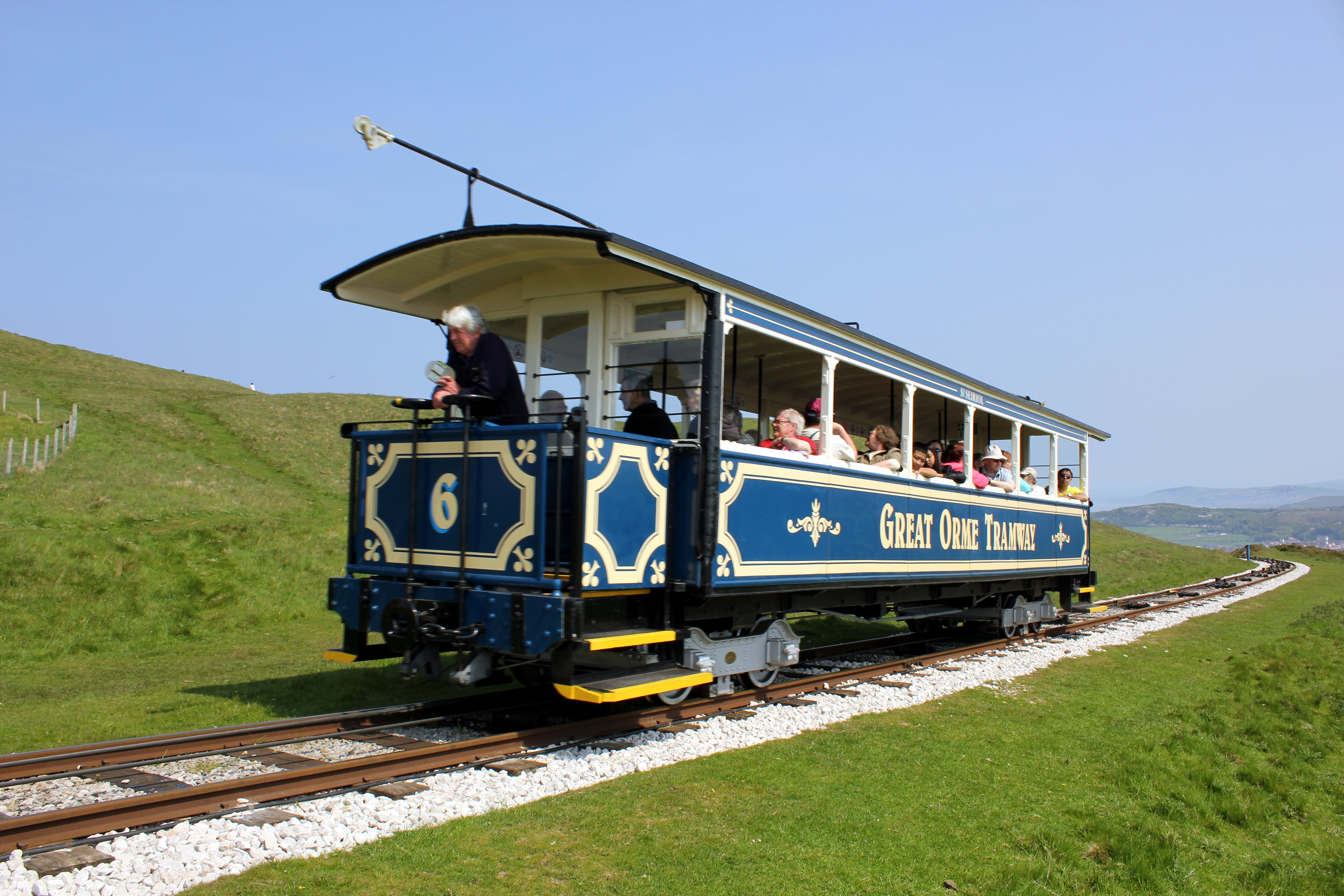
- Clockwise from top: view across the Conwy estuary to Snowdonia; a tram on the Great Orme, Llandudno; and; Dolwyddelan Castle

- Coat of arms
- Motto: Welsh: Tegwch i Bawb, lit. 'fairness to all'
- Conwy shown within Wales
- Coordinates: 53°08′26″N 3°46′14″W
- Sovereign state: United Kingdom
- Country: Wales
- Preserved county: Clwyd
- Incorporated: 1 April 1996
- Named for: Conwy
- Administrative HQ: Conwy

Government
  - Type: Principal council
  - Body: Conwy County Borough Council
  - Control: No overall control
  - MPs: 2 MPs: Gill German (L); Claire Hughes (L)
  - MSs: 12 MSs: 6 in Bangor Conwy Môn; 6 in Clwyd

Area
  - Total: 435 sq mi (1,126 km^{2})
  - Rank: 6th

Population (2024)
  - Total: 114,891
  - Rank: 15th
  - Density: 260/sq mi (102/km^{2})

Welsh language (2021)
  - Speakers: 25.9%
  - Rank: 5th
- Time zone: UTC+0 (GMT)
  - Summer (DST): UTC+1 (BST)
- ISO 3166 code: GB-CWY
- GSS code: W06000003
- Website: conwy.gov.uk

Conwy County Borough (Welsh: Bwrdeistref Sirol Conwy) is a county borough in the north of Wales. It borders the Irish Sea to the north, Gwynedd to the west and south, and Denbighshire to the east. The most populous community is Llandudno, and the administrative centre is Colwyn Bay.

The county borough has an area of 1,126 square kilometres (435 mi^{2}) and had an estimated population of 114,891 in 2024. The largest settlements are on the coast. They include the seaside resorts of Llandudno, Colwyn Bay, and Abergele, which form part of a near-continuous strip of coastal development that extends east to Prestatyn in Denbighshire. Conwy is slightly inland, at the mouth of the River Conwy, and the interior of the county is sparsely populated, with Llanrwst as the only town.

== Geography ==
The geography of Conwy is shaped by the River Conwy, after which the county borough is named. The river rises on the Migneint in the south of the county, where a number of small streams flow into Llyn Conwy. It then flows in a generally northern direction and is joined by the Machno and Lledr, before reaching Betws-y-coed and its confluence with the Llugwy. From Betws-y-coed the river flows north in a wide valley past Llanrwst before broadening into a wide estuary upriver of the town of Conwy. The estuary is bounded to the west by the Creuddyn Peninsula, which contains the two prominent limestone headlands of the Great Orme and the Little Orme.

The east of the county contains part of the Denbigh Moors. The eastern part of the moors within the county are drained by the River Elwy, a tributary of the Clwyd.

The west of the county contains part of Snowdonia, a mountainous region that extends far into Gwynedd. The highest peak within the county is Carnedd Llewelyn, at 1,064 metres (3,491 ft), which is on the boundary with Gwynedd and is the third-highest summit in Wales.

Around Betws-y-Coed is the Gwydir Forest, which is mainly given over to plantations. There are several reservoirs in the county's valleys, the largest of which is Llyn Brenig, which has an area of 3.7 square kilometres (1.4 sq mi) and extends into Denbighshire.

== Welsh language ==
According to the 2001 census 39.7% of the population of the county borough have "one or more skills" in Welsh. In 2021 census 25.9% reported being able to speak Welsh, which ranks Conwy 5th out of 22 principal areas in Wales. The amount of Welsh spoken in the county borough greatly varies from location to location, with generally the least being spoken on the coastal fringe, in which English is mainly spoken.

Examples of the percentage of people age 3+ speaking Welsh by electoral ward, as of the 2011 census:

Ward	Percentage of Welsh speakers
Mostyn	18.4%
Colwyn	20.7%
Conwy	28.7%
Trefriw	45.6%
Eglwysbach	54.3%
Uwch Conwy	60.7%
Llangernyw	65.8%

== Government ==
The county borough was formed on 1 April 1996 by merging the districts of Aberconwy and Colwyn. It was originally named Aberconwy and Colwyn, but its council renamed the district a day later, on 2 April 1996, to Conwy.

=== Politics ===
Conwy is represented in the UK Parliament by Labour Party politicians Gill German and Claire Hughes since the 2024 election. This election implemented new boundaries, which place Conwy County Borough in the Bangor Aberconwy and Clwyd North UK Parliament constituencies. In the Senedd, it is represented by six members of the Senedd covering the two Senedd constituencies of Bangor Conwy Môn and Clwyd.

The two UK parliament constituencies covering Conwy County Borough (in pink) from 2024. 1 = Bangor Aberconwy and 2 = Clwyd North.

=== Coat of arms ===
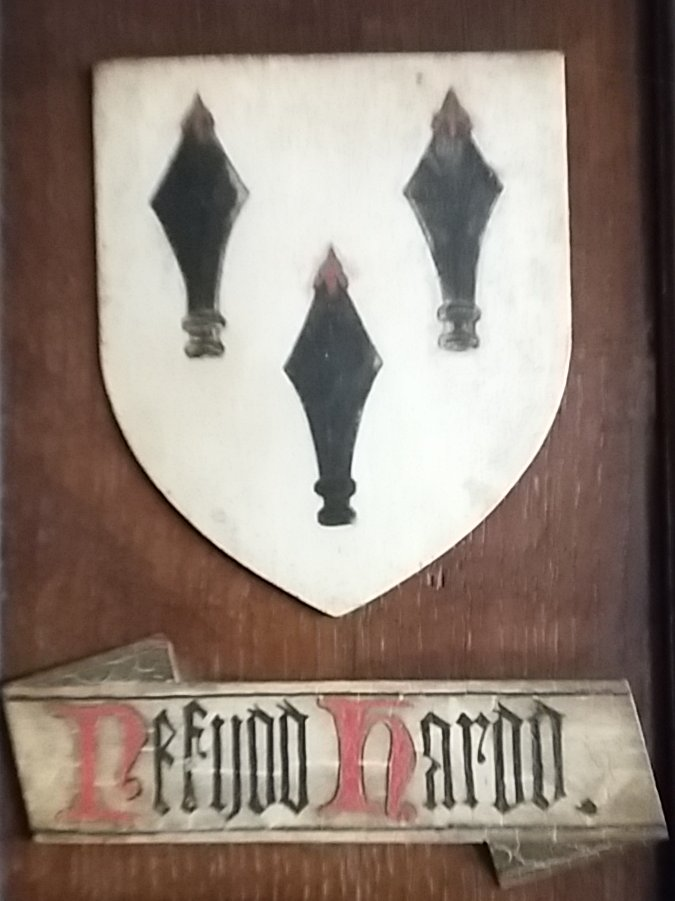
Arms of Nefydd Hardd, Chirk Castle

Conwy County Borough Council was granted a coat of arms by the College of Arms in 2001. The new arms recall those of both Aberconwy and Colwyn Borough Councils. The main part of the shield depicts blue and silver waves for the river from which the county borough takes its name, and also recalls the gold and blue wavy field of Colwyn's arms. On top of the waves is placed a symbolic red tower, representing Conwy Castle. The chief or upper third of the shield is coloured green, the main colour in Aberconwy's arms. In the centre of the chief is a severed head from the heraldry of Marchudd ap Cynan, Lord of Abergele and Rhos. On either side are two black spears embrued, or having drops of blood on their points. These come from the reputed arms of Nefydd Hardd, associated with the Nant Conwy area. In front of each spear is a golden garb or wheatsheaf, for the rural areas of the county borough.

Above the shield, placed on the steel helm usual in British civic arms, is the crest. This takes the form of the Welsh red dragon supporting a Bible, rising from a wreath of oak leaves and acorns. The Bible is to commemorate the first Welsh language translation of the book, which originated in the area, while the oak circlet recalls that an oak tree formed the main charge in the arms of Colwyn Borough Council, and its predecessor the municipal borough of Colwyn Bay.

The motto adopted is Tegwch i Bawb, meaning "Fairness to All".

== Railway ==
The main stations are Llandudno Junction and Colwyn Bay on the North Wales Coast Line with services to Manchester, Cardiff and London via Chester. From Llandudno Junction a branch serves Llandudno and the (single track) Conwy Valley Line runs to Blaenau Ffestiniog. Llandudno itself has a Cable Tramway up the Great Orme.

== See also ==
- List of places in Conwy County Borough for a list of towns and villages
- List of churches in Conwy
- List of schools in Conwy
