= Llanddulas and Rhyd-y-foel =

Community in Conwy County Borough, Wales

Llanddulas and Rhyd-y-foel: Welsh: Llanddulas a Rhyd-y-foel
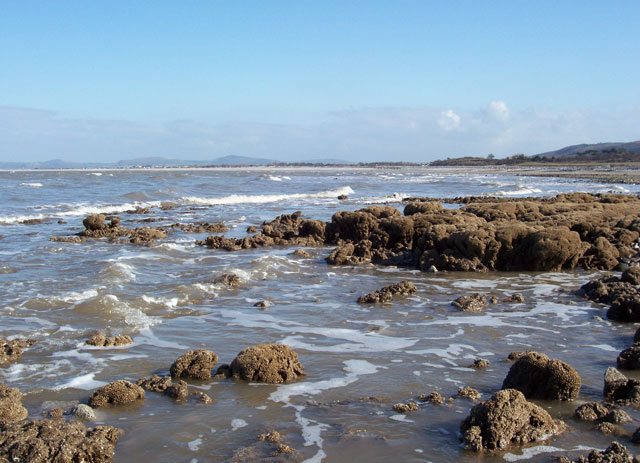
- Honeycomb worm reef at Llanddulas

- Location within Conwy
- Population: 1,542 (2011)
- OS grid reference: SH9078
- Community: Llanddulas and Rhyd-y-foel
- Principal area: Conwy
- Preserved county: Clwyd
- Country: Wales
- Sovereign state: United Kingdom
- Post town: ABERGELE
- Postcode district: LL22
- Dialling code: 01492
- Police: North Wales
- Fire: North Wales
- Ambulance: Welsh
- UK Parliament: Clwyd West
- Senedd Cymru – Welsh Parliament: Clwyd West
- List of places UK Wales Conwy 53.292°N 3.644°W Map of the community

Llanddulas and Rhyd-y-foel (Welsh: Llanddulas a Rhyd-y-foel) is a community in Conwy County Borough, in Wales. It is located on the coast of Liverpool Bay, at the mouth of the Afon Dulas, 2.7 miles (4.3 km) west of Abergele, 3.6 miles (5.8 km) east of Colwyn Bay and 9.0 miles (14.5 km) east of Conwy. As the name suggests, it consists of the villages of Llanddulas and Rhyd-y-foel. At the 2001 census the community had a population of 1,572, reducing slightly to 1,542 at the 2011 census.

Now derelict, Gwrych Castle stands on the hillside to the east of Llanddulas. Built between 1812 and 1822 by Lloyd Hesketh Bamford-Hesketh, it has been described as a "spectacular and romantic flight of gothic fancy," and was an attempt to create a replica of an Edwardian fortress. The castle contains 18 towers, and is surrounded by terraced gardens and woodland, with gothic park walling, lodges and towers. The total frontage is over 0.8 miles (1.3 km) in length, and has been described as "one of the finest examples of its date in Britain" by Cadw. It is Grade I listed.

Saint Cynbryd's Church, in Llanddulas, dates from 1868, and was designed by George Edmund Street, who was also responsible for the Royal Courts of Justice in London. It is on the site of an earlier medieval church which had been rebuilt in 1732, and was commissioned by Robert Bamford-Hesketh of Gwrych Castle. It is described by Cadw as being "of subtle sophistication and quiet mastery" and is Grade II* listed. Similarly listed is Plas Tan-yr-ogof, a farmhouse on the Gwrych estate, built in 1819, which was used for a while as a night club.

Plas Dulas, an 1840s mansion in Llanddulas, now demolished, has literary associations with Evelyn Waugh and Noël Coward. Waugh wrote the book Decline and Fall while staying there and it inspired Llanabba Castle in the novel. At this time, Waugh taught at Arnold House, a former private school in Llanddulas.

In 2008, a 1,148 feet (350 m) long honeycomb worm reef was discovered on the beach at Llanddulas, by fishery officer Philip Capper of the North Western and North Wales Sea Fisheries Committee after an absence of 60 years. The worms are common to the Mediterranean Sea, and are rare in the British Isles, but found at a number of sites on western and southern coasts. They create the reefs by forming tightly packed tubes from sand and shell particles on top of rocky shores, which then provide a haven for barnacles, crabs, limpets, mussels, periwinkles, sea anemones and whelks.

Pen-y-corddyn-mawr is a hillfort located on a limestone plateau above Rhyd-y-foel, where Roman artefacts have been unearthed. Lead mines nearby are thought to have been worked by the Romans, and were still in use in the 1820s, when they provided the lead for Gwrych Castle's windows. The limestone hill of Cefn yr Ogof 204 metres (669 feet)stands above the village. Nearby is the crag of Craig y Forwyn.
