= Llanddulas Limestone and Gwrych Castle Wood =

Protected area in Clwyd, Wales

Llanddulas Limestone and Gwrych Castle Wood is a Site of Special Scientific Interest in the preserved county of Clwyd, north Wales. The designated area lies in the communities of Betws yn Rhos, Llanddulas and Rhyd-y-foel and Llysfaen. The hills of Cefn-yr-Ogof and Craig y Forwyn feature. Gwrych Castle Wood is part of Gwrych Castle, a privately owned estate. This area was once owned by George Lucas in 2003.

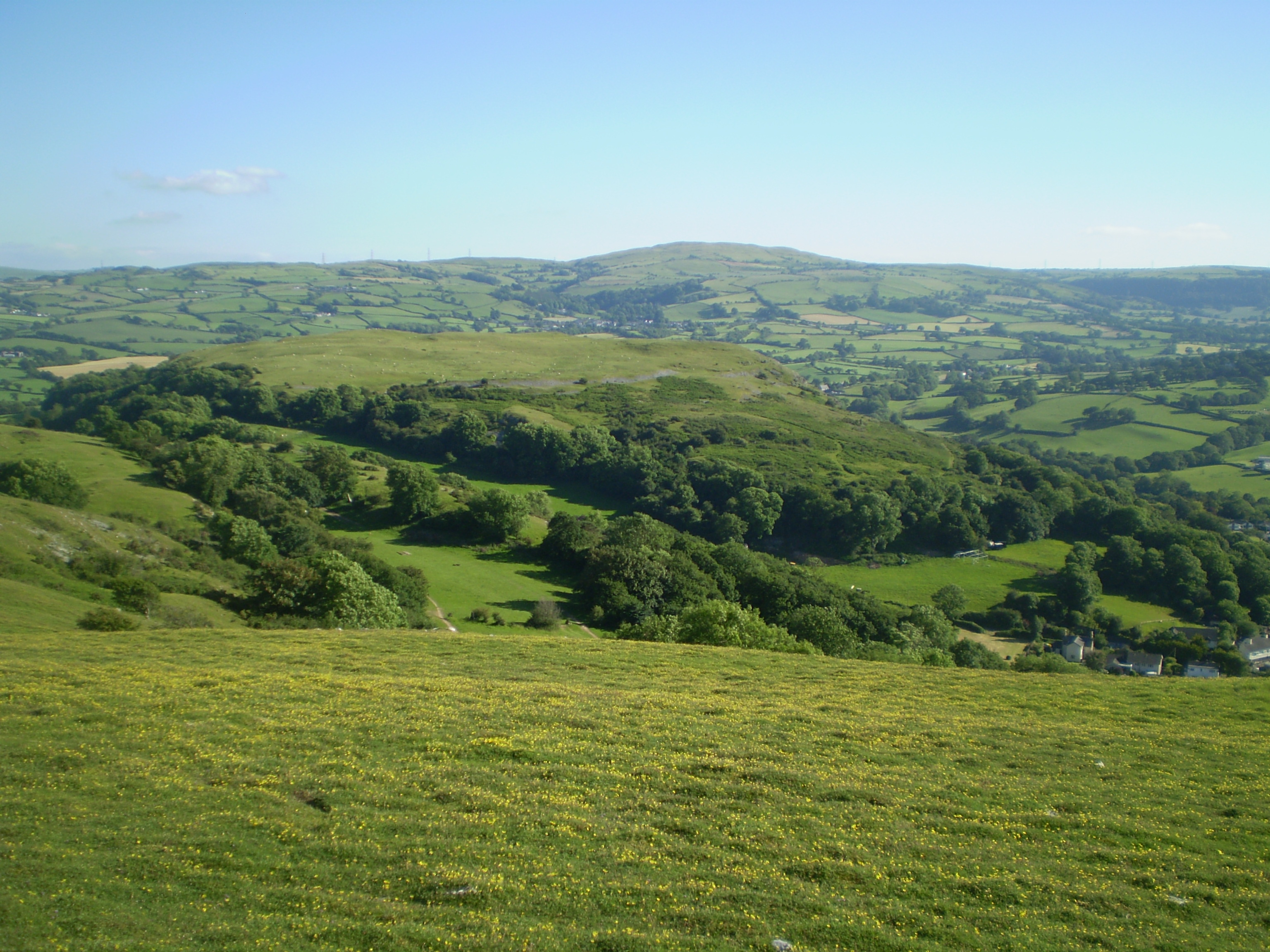
Pen y Corddyn Mawr hillfort from Cefn yr Ogof

== See also ==
- List of Sites of Special Scientific Interest in Clwyd
