= Arthur Banks =

Recipient of the George Cross

- Born: 6 October 1923; Llanddulas, Abergele, North Wales, Wales
- Died: 20 December 1944 (aged 21); Ariano nel Polesine, Province of Rovigo, Veneto, Italy
- Burial place: Plot: III, A, 7, Argenta, Emilia-Romagna, Italy
- Relatives: Father, Charles C. Banks, First World War Ace with the Royal Air Force; Uncle, Arthur Chaplin Banks KIA with Royal Welsh Fusiliers, 22 June 1916, aged 20
- Military career
- Allegiance: United Kingdom
- Branch: Royal Air Force Volunteer Reserve
- Service years: 1941-1944
- Rank: Flight sergeant
- Unit: No. 112 Squadron (1944)
- Conflicts: Second World War: Italian Campaign
- Awards: George Cross

Sergeant Arthur Banks GC (6 October 1923 – 20 December 1944) was a member of the Royal Air Force during the Second World War who was tortured and killed after being captured behind enemy lines. He was posthumously awarded the George Cross for his courage during captivity.

== Early life ==
Banks was born in Llanddulas (a village near Abergele in North Wales). His father, Captain Charles Banks, was a distinguished pilot in the First World War who was awarded the Distinguished Flying Cross for his wartime service. Banks attended St Edward's School, Oxford until 1941.

== Military career ==
Banks enlisted in the Royal Air Force Volunteer Reserve in 1942 and become a member of 112 Squadron, Desert Air Force. On 29 August 1944, three weeks into his active service with 112 Squadron, he was shot down over northern Italy whilst undertaking an armed reconnaissance operation in a Mustang. He tried to reach the Allied lines and made contact with a partisan group (the Boccato group). During the following months he "became an outstanding figure, advising and encouraging them in action against the enemy".

In December 1944, an attempt to cross to Allied territory was planned to enable resupplying of the partisans to take place, but the group Banks was with was betrayed and captured by German forces. He was tortured by German authorities and then by the Italian militia over a period of several days, but Banks remained silent. He was then stripped, doused in petrol and set alight before being thrown, weighted down, into the River Po. He managed to survive and swam to the river bank, where he was recaptured by the Brigate Nere (Italian fascists) and shot in the head. Initially buried in a communal dung-heap by his captors, Banks is now buried at the Argenta Gap War Cemetery. There is also a commemoration stone for Banks at the War Memorial in Llanddulas.

He was awarded the George Cross posthumously for his "courage and endurance", with his conduct being described as "at all times, in keeping with the highest traditions of the Service, even in the face of most brutal and inhuman treatment.". Notice of the award was published in The London Gazette on 5 November 1946. The Cross was presented to his father by King George VI.

His captors were tried by a War Crimes Tribunal and were imprisoned for between 4.5 and 20 years; the one who directed his torture was shot after being captured by Italians. The man who murdered Arthur Banks was Lieutenant Turati. Turati had been a member of the infamous Brigate Nere. Postwar, Captain Ian Bell of the War Crimes Investigation Unit, captured Turati at his home in Italy.

According to the Central Registry of War Criminals and Security Suspects (CROWCASS) other Italians, most of them members of the fascist Black Brigades, may have been involved in crimes against British soldiers, at the same time and in the same area.
