= Murray Pipon =

Vice-Admiral Sir Murray Pipon KBE CMG MVO
- Born: James Murray Pakenham Pipon; October 25, 1882
- Died: January 14, 1971 (aged 88)
- Military career
- Allegiance: United Kingdom
- Branch: Royal Navy
- Rank: Vice-Admiral
- Commands: HMS Royal Sovereign
- Conflicts: World War I World War II

Vice-Admiral Sir James Murray Pakenham Pipon KBE CMG MVO (25 October 1882 – 14 January 1971) was a Royal Navy officer who served in World War I and, after being recalled to active duty in 1940, World War II.

== Early life ==
Pipon was the eldest son of Capt. John Pakenham Pipon of the Royal Navy. He attended the Arnold House preparatory school in the village of Llanddulas, north Wales.

== Career ==
After World War I, Pipon served as naval attaché in Paris, France, chief of staff to the Commander-in-Chief, Plymouth and commanded the battleship Royal Sovereign in 1930–1932. His last appointment before retiring in 1936 was as Rear-Admiral-in-Command and Admiral-superintendent, HM Dockyard, Gibraltar.

The post of Senior British Naval Officer, Suez Canal Area was established on 14 December 1939, with Vice Admiral James M. Pipon taking command on 7 January 1940. Pipon was shore based, at Ismailia in Egypt. He reported directly to the Commander-in-Chief Mediterranean Fleet. In the Navy List for December 1940 Pipon is shown as borne on the books of Stag, 'additional, for various services.'

== Personal life ==
On 29 December 1921, Pipon was married to Hon. Bertha Louise Victoria Lopes (1895–1971), second daughter of Henry Lopes, 1st Baron Roborough and Lady Alberta Louisa Florence Edgcumbe (second daughter of William Edgcumbe, 4th Earl of Mount Edgcumbe and Lady Katherine Elizabeth Hamilton, the fourth daughter of James Hamilton, 1st Duke of Abercorn). Together, they were the parents of:

- Penelope Elizabeth Pipon, who married Colin Harris Baker, of The Glebe House in Peter Tavy, Tavistock, Devon.

Pipon died on 14 January 1971.

== Bibliography ==
- Halpern, Paul G., ed. (2016). The Mediterranean Fleet, 1930–1939. Publications of the Navy Records Society. Vol. 163. London: Routledge for the Navy Records Society. ISBN 978-1-4724-7597-8.
