= Charles C. Banks =

British flying ace

Charles Chaplin Banks
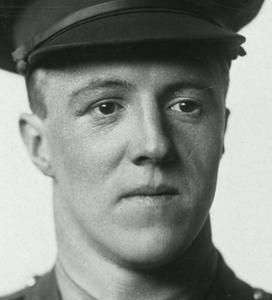
- Banks, in c. 1914
- Born: 17 December 1893; Hampstead, London, England
- Died: 21 December 1971 (aged 78); Lewes, Sussex, England
- Relatives: Arthur Chaplin Banks, KIA with Royal Welsh Fusiliers, 22 June 1916, aged 20 (brother); Flight Sergeant Arthur Banks, GC, KIA 20 December 1944 (son)
- Military career
- Allegiance: United Kingdom
- Branch: British Army (1916-1918); Royal Air Force (1918)
- Service years: 1914-1918
- Rank: Captain
- Nickname: "Sandy"
- Units: Royal Welsh Fusiliers (1914-16); 44 Squadron RFC (1916-18); 43 Squadron RAF (1918)
- Conflicts: World War I; Western Front
- Awards: Military Cross; Distinguished Flying Cross

Captain Charles Chaplin Banks DFC MC (17 December 1893 – 21 December 1971) was a World War I flying ace credited with thirteen aerial victories. He scored a pioneering night fighter victory on 31 May 1918, when he shot down a German Friedrichshafen G bomber.

== Early life and service ==
Charles Chaplin Banks was the son of Helen Agnes and Charles P. Banks; the latter owned and taught at the Arnold House Preparatory School in Llanddulas, Wales. Banks was commissioned as a second lieutenant in the 5th (Flintshire) Battalion of the Royal Welsh Fusiliers (later the Royal Welch Fusiliers), on 10 December 1914, having been a cadet in the Oxford University Contingent, Senior Division, Officers' Training Corps. He transferred to the Royal Flying Corps in October 1916. After pilot training, he was assigned to 44 Squadron.

== Aerial service ==
On 28 January 1918, while flying his Sopwith Camel on Home Defence duties with 44 Squadron, he teamed with Captain George Hackwill in driving down and capturing a raiding German Gotha G.V bomber, serial no. 936/16; a Military Cross followed.

He was then sent to France to serve with 43 Squadron. Between 6 April and 31 May 1918, he reeled off five more wins; for the last of these, he drove down and captured a Friedrichshafen G bomber at ten minutes before midnight for the first victory over this type. He would destroy three more enemy fighters by 29 August, bringing his total to nine. He then switched to the new Sopwith Snipe for his last three wins, ending his string on 30 October 1918. His final tally was two enemy planes captured, six destroyed, and four driven down out of control, although one of the latter was shared with Captain Cecil Frederick King. His DFC was gazetted to him postwar.

== Honours and awards ==
Military Cross (MC)

Lieutenant Charles Chaplin Banks, Royal Welsh Fusiliers and RFC.
Temporary Captain George Henry Hackwill, General List and RFC.
For conspicuous gallantry displayed when they engaged and shot down a Gotha raiding London. During the engagement, which lasted a considerable time, they were continually under fire from the enemy machine.

Distinguished Flying Cross (DFC)
Lieutenant (Acting-Captain) Charles Chaplin Banks, M.C.
A brilliant and skilful airman who has been conspicuous for his success in aerial combats. On 30 October he, single handed, engaged five enemy aeroplanes and drove one down out of control. In the fight his aileron controls were shot away, but by skilful handling and with cool presence of mind he brought his machine back and made a successful landing. In addition to the above Capt. Banks has accounted for nine other enemy machines.

== Bibliography ==
- Shores, Christopher F.; Franks, Norman; Guest, Russell (1990). Above the Trenches: A Complete Record of the Fighter Aces and Units of the British Empire Air Forces 1915-1920. London, UK: Grub Street. ISBN 0-948817-19-4.
