= The Temple at Thatch =

Unpublished novel by Evelyn Waugh

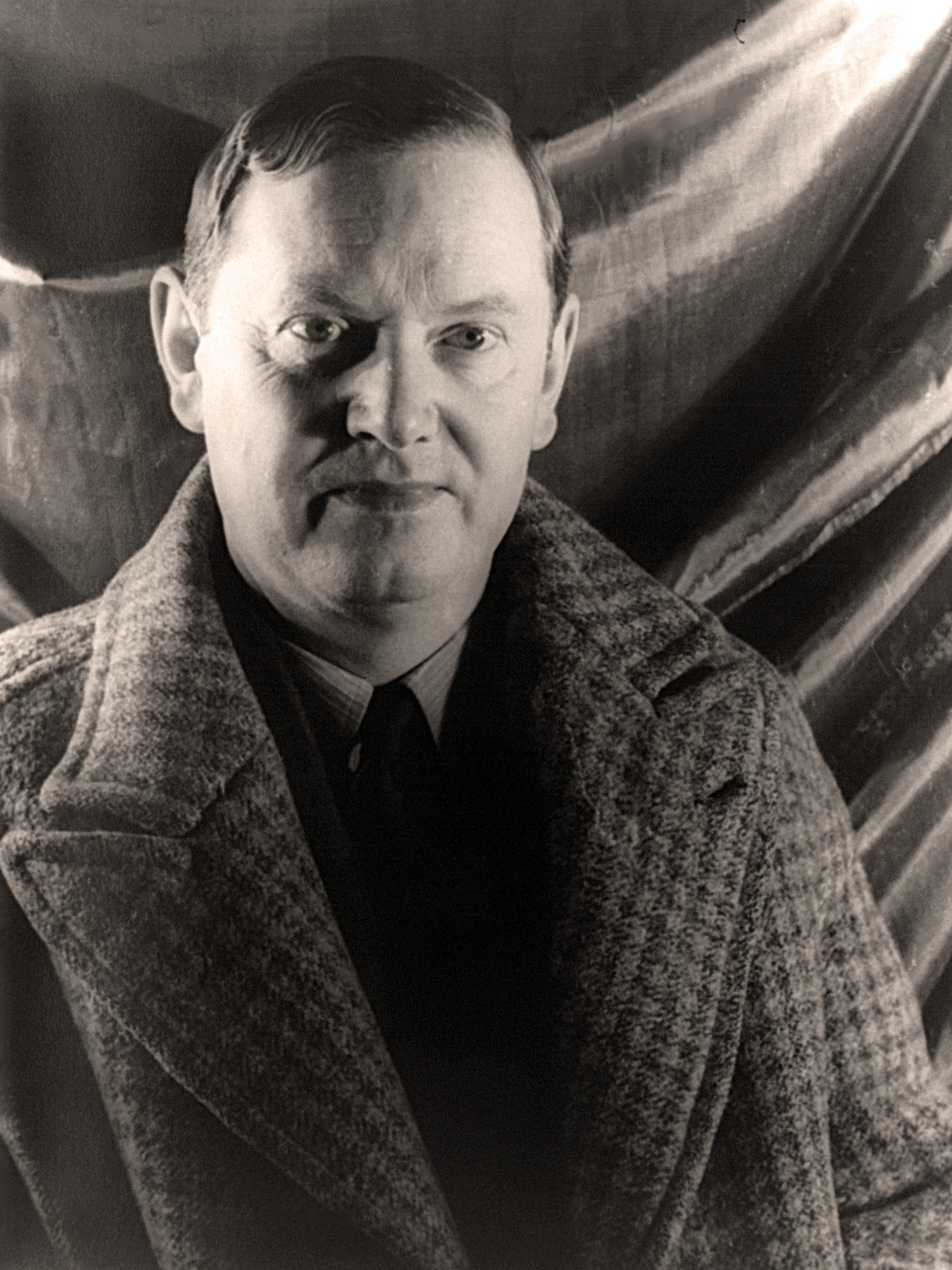
Evelyn Waugh, at the height of his career as a novelist

The Temple at Thatch was an unpublished novel by the British author Evelyn Waugh, his first adult attempt at full-length fiction. He began writing it in 1924 at the end of his final year as an undergraduate at Hertford College, Oxford, and continued to work on it intermittently in the following 12 months. After his friend Harold Acton commented unfavourably on the draft in June 1925, Waugh burned the manuscript. In a fit of despondency from this and other personal disappointments he began a suicide attempt before experiencing what he termed "a sharp return to good sense".

In the absence of a manuscript or printed text, most information on the novel's subject comes from Waugh's diary entries and later reminiscences. The story was evidently semi-autobiographical, based on Waugh's Oxford experiences. The protagonist was an undergraduate and the work's main themes were madness and black magic. Some of the novel's ideas may have been incorporated into Waugh's first commercially published work of fiction, his 1925 short story "The Balance", which includes several references to a country house called "Thatch" and is partly structured as a film script, as apparently was the lost novel. "The Balance" contains characters, perhaps carried over from The Temple at Thatch, who appear by name in Waugh's later fiction.

Acton's severe judgement did not deter Waugh from his intention to be a writer, but it affected his belief that he could succeed as a novelist. For a time he turned his attention away from fiction, but with the gradual recovery of his self-confidence he was able to complete his first novel, Decline and Fall, which was published with great success in 1928.

== Background ==
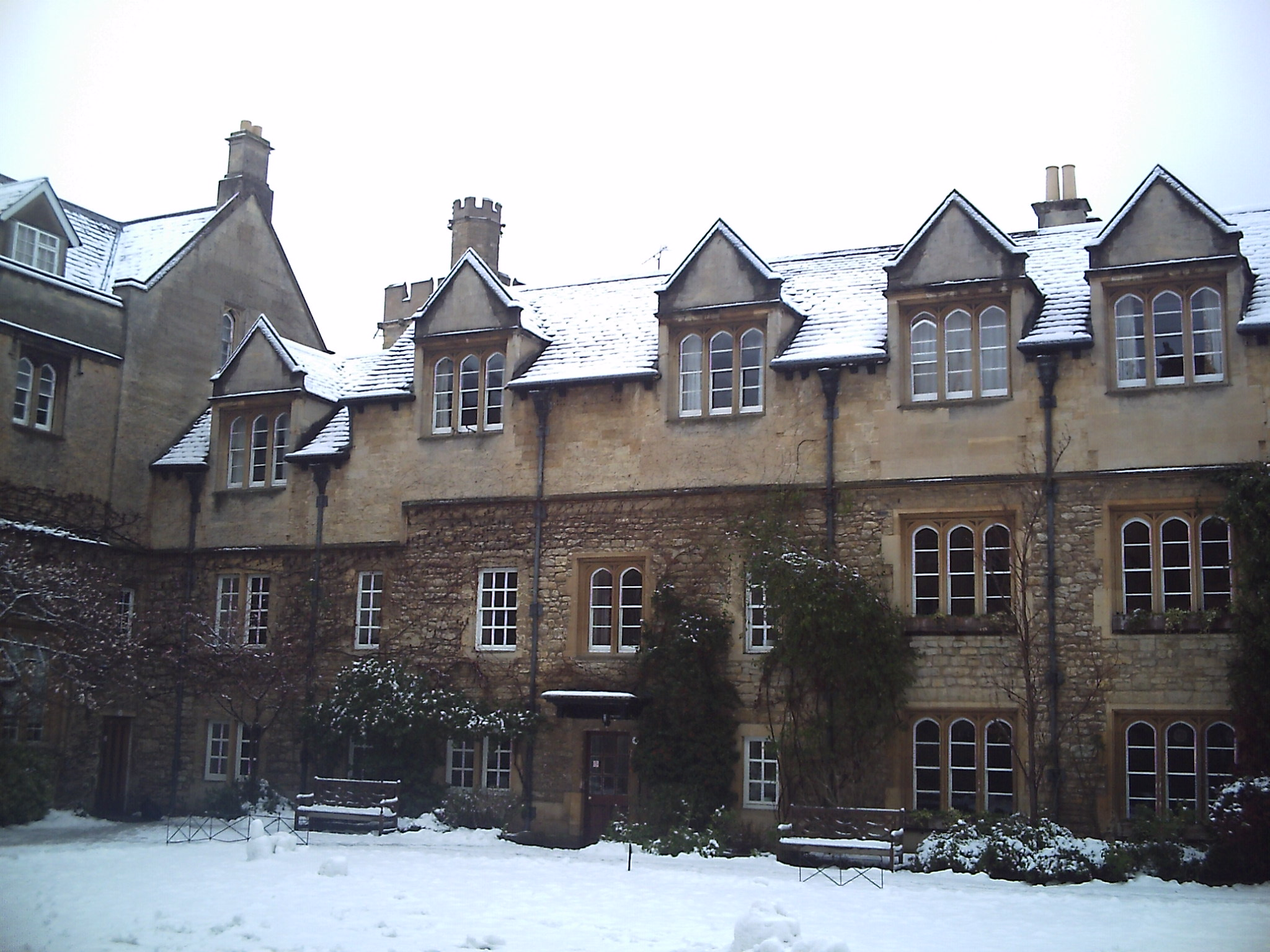
Hertford College, Oxford, where Evelyn Waugh conceived the idea of The Temple at Thatch in 1924

Evelyn Waugh's literary pedigree was strong. His father, the publisher Arthur Waugh (1866–1943), was a respected literary critic for The Daily Telegraph; his elder brother Alec (1899–1981) was a successful novelist whose first book The Loom of Youth became a controversial best seller in 1917. Evelyn wrote his first extant story "The Curse of the Horse Race" in 1910, when he was seven years old. In the years before the First World War he helped to edit and produce a handwritten publication called The Pistol Troop Magazine, and also wrote poems. Later, as a schoolboy at Lancing College, he wrote a parody of Katherine Mansfield's style, entitled "The Twilight of Language". He also tried to write a novel, (Note: A fragment of the Lancing novel survived, and was eventually published in The Complete Short Stories (1998).) but soon gave this up to concentrate on a school-themed play, Conversion, which was performed before the school in the summer of 1921.

At Hertford College, Oxford, where Waugh arrived in January 1922 to study history, he became part of a circle that included a number of future writers and critics of eminence—Harold Acton, Christopher Hollis, Anthony Powell and Cyril Connolly, among others. He also formed close personal friendships with aristocratic and near-aristocratic contemporaries such as Hugh Lygon and Alastair Graham, either of whom may have been models for Sebastian Flyte in Waugh's later novel Brideshead Revisited. From such companions Waugh acquired the fascination with the aristocracy and country houses that would embellish much of his fiction. At Oxford Waugh did little work and dedicated himself largely to social pleasures: "The record of my life there is essentially a catalogue of friendships". However, he developed a reputation as a skilful graphic artist, and contributed articles, reviews and short stories to both the main university magazines, Isis and Cherwell.

One of the Isis stories, "Unacademic Exercise: A Nature Story", describes the performance of a magical ceremony by which an undergraduate is transformed by his fellows into a werewolf. Waugh's interest in the occult is further demonstrated by his involvement, in the summer of 1924, in an amateur film entitled 666, in which he certainly appeared and which he may have written. He appears to have been in a state of some mental confusion or turmoil; the writer Simon Whitechapel cites a letter from Waugh to a friend, written at this time: "I have been living very intensely the last three weeks. For the past fortnight I have been nearly insane. I am a little saner now." However, most scholars take this as a referring to Waugh's homosexuality rather than black magic.

== Composition ==
The earliest record of Waugh's intention to attempt a novel appears in a letter dated May 1924, to his schoolfriend Dudley Carew. Waugh writes: "Quite soon I am going to write a little book. It is going to be called The Temple at Thatch and will be all about magic and madness". This writing project may have been a reaction to Waugh's immediate circumstances; he was in the last weeks of his Oxford career, contemplating failure in his examinations and irritated by the fact that most of his contemporaries appeared to be on the verge of brilliant careers. On 22 June 1924 he spent time working out the plot, a continuation of the supernatural theme explored in "Unacademic Exercise". The basic premise was an undergraduate inheriting a country house of which nothing was left except an 18th-century folly, where he set up house and practised black magic.

"Death is the sad estranger of acquaintance, the eternal divorcer of marriage, the ravisher of the children from their parents, the stealer of parents from the children, the interrer of fame, the sole cause of forgetfulnesse, by which the living talk of those gone away as of so many shadows, or fabulous Paladins"

— Thomas Drummond of Hawthornden, "A Cypress Grove".

Waugh's diary indicates that he began writing the story on 21 July, when he completed a dozen pages of the first chapter; he thought it was "quite good". He appears to have done no more work on the project until early September, when he confides to his diary that it is "in serious danger of becoming dull", and expresses doubts that it will ever be finished. However, Waugh apparently found fresh inspiration after reading A Cypress Grove, an essay by the 17th-century Scots poet William Drummond of Hawthornden, and considered retitling his story The Fabulous Paladins after a passage in the essay.

The autumn of 1924 was spent largely in the pursuit of pleasure until, shortly before Christmas, the pressing need to earn money led Waugh to apply for teaching jobs in private schools. His diary entry for 17 December 1924 records: "Still writing out letters in praise of myself to obscure private schools, and still attempting to rewrite The Temple". He eventually secured a job as assistant master at Arnold House Preparatory School in Denbighshire, North Wales, at a salary of £160 a year, and left London on 22 January to take up his post, carrying with him the manuscript of The Temple.

During his first term at Arnold House Waugh found few opportunities to continue his writing. He was tired by the end of the day, his interest in The Temple flagged, and from time to time his attention wandered to other subjects; he contemplated a book on Silenus, but he admitted that it "may or may not ... be written". After the Easter holidays he felt more positively about The Temple: "I am making the first chapter a cinema film, and have been writing furiously ever since. I honestly think that it is going to be rather good". He sometimes worked on the book during classes, telling any boys who dared to ask what he was doing that he was writing a history of the Eskimos. By June he felt confident enough to send the first few chapters to his Oxford friend Harold Acton, "asking for criticism and hoping for praise". Earlier that year Waugh had commented warmly on Acton's book of poems, An Indian Ass, "which brought back memories of a life [at Oxford] infinitely remote".

== Rejection ==
While waiting for Acton's reply, Waugh heard that his brother Alec had arranged a job for him based in Pisa, Italy, as secretary to the Scottish writer Charles Kenneth Scott Moncrieff who was working on the first English translation of Marcel Proust's novel sequence À la recherche du temps perdu. Waugh promptly resigned his position at Arnold House, in anticipation of "a year abroad drinking Chianti under olive trees." Then came Acton's "polite but chilling" response to The Temple at Thatch. This letter has not survived; its wording was recalled by Waugh 40 years later, in his biography A Little Learning. Acton wrote that the story was "too English for my exotic taste ... too much nid-nodding over port." He recommended, facetiously, that the book be printed "in a few elegant copies for the friends who love you", and gave a list of the least elegant of their mutual acquaintances. Many years later Acton wrote of the story: "It was an airy Firbankian trifle, totally unworthy of Evelyn, and I brutally told him so. It was a misfired jeu d'esprit. (Note: Jeu d'esprit, literally "game of spirit", is defined as "a light-hearted display of wit or cleverness" in Collins English Dictionary 7th edition (2005), Glasgow. HarperCollins, ISBN 0-00-719153-7.)

Waugh did not query his friend's judgement, but took his manuscript to the school's furnaces and unceremoniously burnt it. Immediately afterwards he received the news that the job with Scott Moncrieff had fallen through. The double blow affected Waugh severely; he wrote in his diary in July: "The phrase 'the end of the tether' besets me with unshakeable persistence". In his biography Waugh writes: "I went down alone to the beach with my thoughts full of death. I took off my clothes and began swimming out to sea. Did I really intend to drown myself? That was certainly in my mind". He left a note with his clothes, a quotation from Euripides about the sea washing away all human ills. A short way out, after being stung by jellyfish, he abandoned the attempt, turned round and swam back to the shore. He did not, however, withdraw his resignation from the school, returning instead to London.

== "The Balance" ==
Although he had destroyed his novel, Waugh still intended to be a writer, and in the late summer of 1925 completed a short story, called "The Balance". This became his first commercially published work when Chapman and Hall, where his father was managing director, included it in a short stories collection the following year. (Note: "The Balance" had earlier been rejected by several other publishers, including The Hogarth Press and Chatto & Windus.) "The Balance" has no magical themes, but in other respects has clear references to The Temple at Thatch. Both works have Oxford settings, and the short story is written in the film script format that Waugh devised for the first chapter of the novel.

There are several references in "The Balance" to a country house called "Thatch", though this is a fully functioning establishment in the manner of Brideshead rather than a ruined folly. Imogen Quest, the protagonist Adam's girlfriend, lives at Thatch; a watercolour of the house is displayed in Adam's undergraduate's rooms; the end of the story describes a house party at Thatch, during which the guests gossip maliciously about Adam. The names "Imogen Quest" and "Adam" were used by Waugh several years later in his novel Vile Bodies, leading to speculation as to whether these names, like that of the house, originated in The Temple at Thatch.

== Afterwards ==
Acton's dismissal of The Temple at Thatch had made Waugh nervous of his potential as an imaginative writer—he deferred to Acton's judgement on all literary issues—and he did not for the time being attempt to write another novel. After "The Balance" he wrote a humorous article, "Noah, or the Future of Intoxication", which was first accepted and then rejected by the publishers Kegan Paul. However, a short story called "A House of Gentle Folks", was published in The New Decameron: The Fifth Day, edited by Hugh Chesterman (Oxford: Basil. Blackwell, 1927). Thereafter, for a time, Waugh devoted himself to non-fictional work. An essay on the Pre-Raphaelites was published in a limited edition by Waugh's friend Alastair Graham; this led to the production of a full-length book, Rossetti, His Life and Works, published in 1928.

The desire to write fiction persisted, however, and in the autumn of 1927 Waugh began a comic novel which he entitled Picaresque: or the Making of an Englishman. The first pages were read to another friend, the future novelist Anthony Powell, who found them very amusing, and was surprised when Waugh told him, just before Christmas, that the manuscript had been burned. This was not in fact the case; Waugh had merely put the work aside. Early in 1928 he wrote to Harold Acton, asking whether or not he should finish it. On this occasion Acton was full of praise; Waugh resumed work, and completed the novel by April 1928. It was published later that year under a new title, Decline and Fall.

According to his recent biographer Paula Byrne, Waugh had "found his vocation as a writer, and over the next few years his career would rise spectacularly." The Temple of Thatch was quickly forgotten, and as Whitechapel points out, has failed to arouse much subsequent interest from scholars. Whitechapel, however, considers it a loss to literature, and adds: "Whether or not it matched the quality of his second novel, Decline and Fall, if it were still extant it could not fail to be of interest to both scholars and general readers."

== Notes and references ==
Notes

== Sources ==
- Amory, Mark, ed. (1995). The Letters of Evelyn Waugh. London: Orion Books Ltd. ISBN 1-85799-245-8.
- Byrne, Paula (2010). Mad World: Evelyn Waugh and the Secrets of Brideshead. London: Harper Press. ISBN 978-0-00-724377-8.
- Davie, Michael, ed. (1976). The Diaries of Evelyn Waugh. London: Weidenfeld and Nicolson. ISBN 0-297-77126-4.
- Hastings, Selena (1994). Evelyn Waugh: A Biography. London: Sinclair-Stevenson. ISBN 1-85619-223-7.
- Powell, Anthony (1978). To Keep the Ball Rolling, Vol. II: Messengers of Day. London: Heinemann. ISBN 0-434-59923-9.
- Slater, Ann Pasternak (ed. and introduction) (1998). Evelyn Waugh: The Complete Short Stories. London: David Campbell Publishers (Everyman's Library). ISBN 1-85715-190-9.
- Stannard, Martin (1993). Evelyn Waugh Volume 1: The Early Years 1903–39. London: Flamingo. ISBN 0-586-08678-1.
- Stannard, Martin (2004). "Evelyn Arthur St John Waugh". Oxford Dictionary of National Biography. (subscription required)
- Sykes, Christopher (1975). Evelyn Waugh: A Biography. London: Collins. ISBN 0-00-211202-7.
- Waugh, Evelyn (1983). A Little Learning. Harmondsworth, UK: Penguin Books. ISBN 0-14-006604-7.
- Whitechapel, Simon (2002). "Adam and Evelyn: The Balance, The Temple at Thatch and 666". Evelyn Waugh Newsletter and Studies. 33 (2). Leicester: University of Leicester.
