= Arnold House, Llanddulas =

Historic mansion in north Wales

Arnold House
- Historic photograph of the entrance to Arnold House, including the Llanddulas Hall building

Location
- Llanddulas, Conwy, Wales; United Kingdom; 53.28658°N 3.64534°W

Information
- Other name: Arnold House School
- Former name: Arnold House Preparatory School
- Type: Independent preparatory boarding school for boys
- Motto: Laborare Est Orare (To work is to pray)
- Established: 1867
- Founders: Rev. James Clement Collier Pipon; Susan Augusta Griffiths
- Closed: 1943
- Staff: Evelyn Waugh
- Gender: Boys
- Age: 7 to 13
- Language: English

Arnold House was a private boys preparatory school in Llanddulas, Conwy, north Wales, known especially for its association with Evelyn Waugh.

== History ==
The school was founded Arnold House Preparatory School around 1867 at 29 Parkgate Road in the city of Chester, north England. The founders were Reverend James Clement Collier Pipon (also the first headmaster) together with Susan Augusta Griffiths, his wife. In 1874, Susan Griffiths died shortly after the birth of Philip James Griffiths Pipon, their only child. The following year, the school moved to the village of Llanddulas on the coast of north Wales. The school was renamed Arnold House School in 1875. It was an independent preparatory boarding school for boys, intended for the sons of army/navy officers, businessmen, clergy, gentry, and the middle classes in general. The school prepared pupils for the Common Entrance examination aimed at entry to public schools and also naval colleges. In the 1920s, pupil numbers increased and the school was divided into three boys' houses – Bingham's, Conwy's, and Pipon's – named after three alumni, all of whom became Admirals in the Royal Navy.

The school closed around 1943 because of reducing numbers of pupils and World War II. From that time, it became a Jewish convalescent home, then a country club. Later, school buildings were converted for residential use. The buildings are now known as Ty Delfryn, Llanddulas Hall and Daniel's House.

== Alumni ==
The following were notable alumni:

- Rear Admiral The Hon. Edward Barry Stewart Bingham VC
- Evelyn Waugh. Teacher and writer.
- Captain Basil Brooke, Royal Navy officer
- Cyril Cusack, Irish actor
- Geoffrey Francis Fisher (Baron Fisher of Lambeth), Archbishop of Canterbury during 1945–1961
- Sir Edward Townley Peel KBE, DSO, MC
- Vice-Admiral Sir James Murray Pipon
- Rear-Admiral Rafe Grenville Rowley-Conwy DSM

== Headmasters ==
The following were headmasters of the school:

- 1867–1901: Rev. James C.C. Pipon
- 1901–1903: Donald S. Bird
- 1903–1928: Charles P. Banks
- 1928–1932: Capt. Charles C. Banks
- 1932–1939: Robert W. FitzAucher
- 1939–1941: Keith A. Gaskell
- 1941–1943: James C. Robinson

== Evelyn Waugh ==
The novelist Evelyn Waugh taught History, Latin, and Greek at the school during January to July 1925, after finishing as a student at Oxford University. He stayed at Plas Dulas nearby during the 1920s. While at Plas Dulas, he wrote his first book Decline and Fall, published in 1928. His experiences during his time at the school inspired the fictional school Llanabba Castle in this satirical novel. In his 1964 autobiography, two years before he died, Waugh confessed that he attempted suicide by drowning in the sea at Llanddulas during his time at the school.
