= Craig y Forwyn (Conwy) =

Crag in Conwy County Borough, Wales

Coordinates: 53.2788°N 3.6415°W

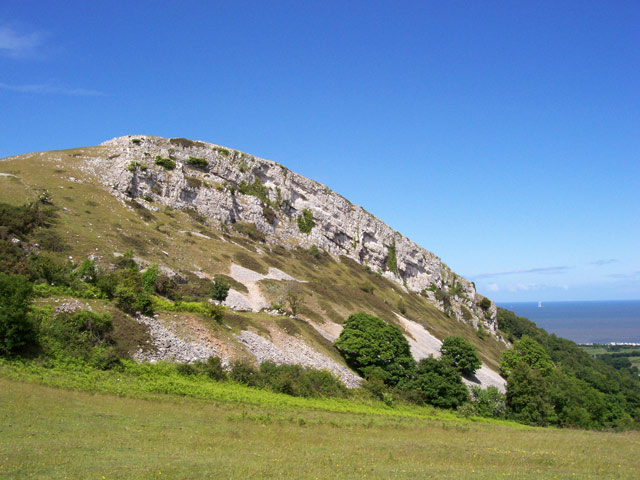
Craig y Forwyn

Craig y Forwyn (meaning "Maiden's Crag" in English) is a crag in Conwy County Borough, Wales, located less than a mile south of Llanddulas, near the village of Rhyd y Foel. The cliff is composed of carboniferous limestone and is of interest to geologists as a source of fossils and to rock climbers as a fine cliff with many interesting climbing routes.

== Rock climbing ==
Craig y Forwyn reaches a height of 110 metres (360 ft), and rock climbers have identified and rated more than 160 routes for ascending it. The rapidity with which the rock dries makes the cliff a useful climbing venue after rain has fallen.

== Location ==
The cliff lies on the west bank of the Afon Dulas, which reaches the sea at Llanddulas, and is slightly inland of the belt of carboniferous limestone that runs along the coast from Great Ormes Head to Point of Ayr, about three miles west of Abergele. The Dulas passes through a gap in the limestone belt, the strata of which dip from the north or northeast. This band of limestone is less than a mile wide. The summit of the hill is 190 m (623 ft) above sea level.

== Geology ==
The cliff's carboniferous limestone is underlain by a seam about a foot thick of impure coal and a narrow stratum of bituminous shale. This bears impressions of fossil plants including Lepidodendron, Poacites resembling leaves, and encrinite. Another stratum lower down the cliff is of pebbles of a greenish sandstone, and this contains fossils of bivalve molluscs as well as more sections of encrinites. Nearby is Llanddulas quarry, which produces a particularly porcelain-like limestone that has been used architecturally for such buildings as St Margaret's Church, Bodelwyddan, commonly known as the "marble church".
