= Castell Cawr =

Forested hill with iron age fort in Wales

Coordinates: 53.2766°N 3.5977°W

Castell Cawr, or Tan-y-Gopa as it is known locally, is a heavily forested hill above the town of Abergele in Conwy county borough, Wales. On it is found the Iron Age hillfort of Castell Cawr, which overlooks the River Clwyd. Rare lesser horseshoe bats inhabit caves on the hill. The woods are owned by the Woodland Trust. The hill rises to 189 m (620 ft) above sea level, with extensive views to Snowdonia and the Clwydian Range.

Thomas Pennant visited the area in the 18th century, and noted the existence of the hillfort. In 1860, James Halliwell-Phillipps wrote that the outline of the hillfort was obscured by vegetation, and identified the workings of a Roman lead mine on the hillside. The Welsh knew these excavations by the name "Ffos-y-bleiddiaid" ("Ditch of the Wolves")

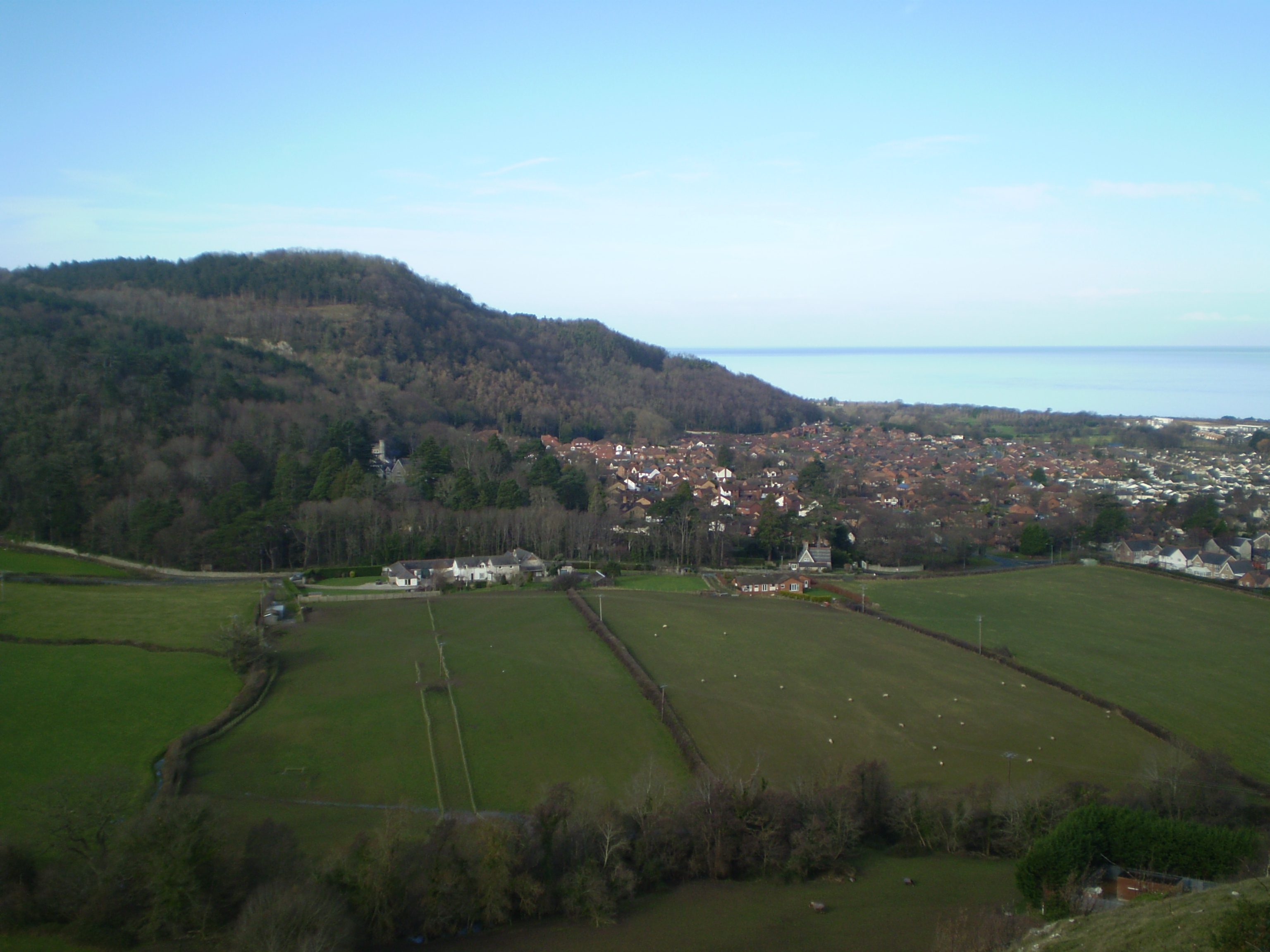
Castell Cawr from Tower Hill

== See also ==
- List of hillforts in Wales
