= St George, Conwy =

Village in Conwy County Borough, Wales

Coordinates: 53.267°N 3.538°W

St George: Welsh: Llansansiôr
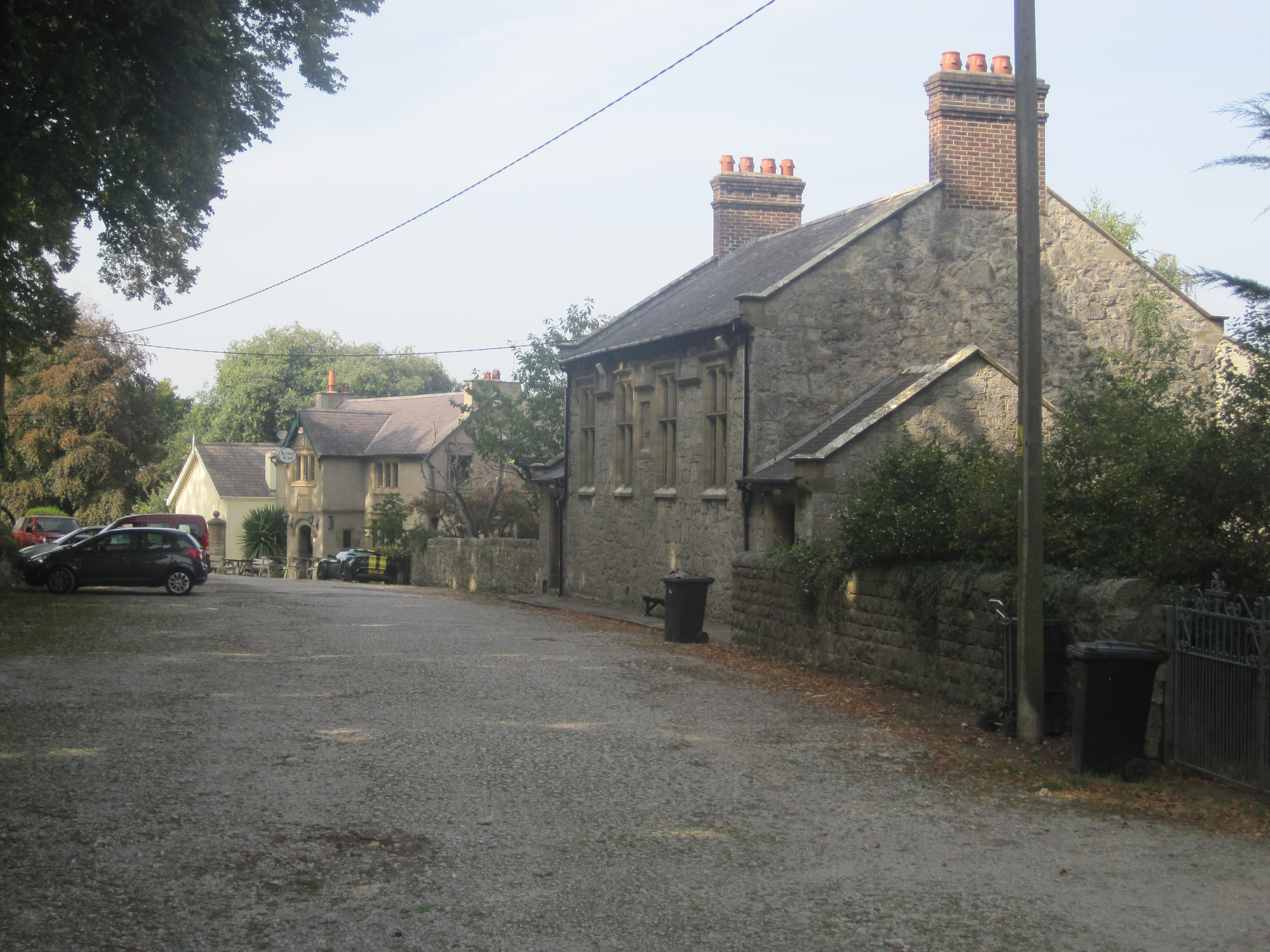
- St George

- Location within Conwy
- Population: 332
- OS grid reference: SH9775
- Community: Abergele
- Principal area: Conwy
- Preserved county: Clwyd
- Country: Wales
- Sovereign state: United Kingdom
- Post town: ABERGELE
- Postcode district: LL22
- Dialling code: 01745
- Police: North Wales
- Fire: North Wales
- Ambulance: Welsh
- UK Parliament: Clwyd North
- Senedd Cymru – Welsh Parliament: Clwyd West

St George (Welsh: Llansansior, sometimes Llan San(t) Siôr or Llan Sain Siôr) is a small village in the county borough of Conwy, Wales and is close to the coastal town of Abergele, and in the community of. in 1873, the townships of Cegidog Isaf, Cegidog Uchaf, Meifod and Dinorben was annexed within a new parish known today as 'St George'. Nearby is the hamlet of Bodtegwel. The population of the area in 2011 was 332.

Historically part of Denbighshire, St George has been part of the County Borough of Conwy since local government reorganisation in 1996.

== Amenities ==
Within the village are a parish church, the Kinmel Arms public house, and a primary school. The Kinmel Hall estate is also nearby, as is a private day nursery.

There was also an undocumented railway station at St George near Barrow Hill. It was on the now defunct Kinmel Park Railway and branched off near St George Quarry a terminus at Faenol Bach. It closed along with the railway in the 1960s. Nothing remains and the trackbed is now in use for a paint ball company.

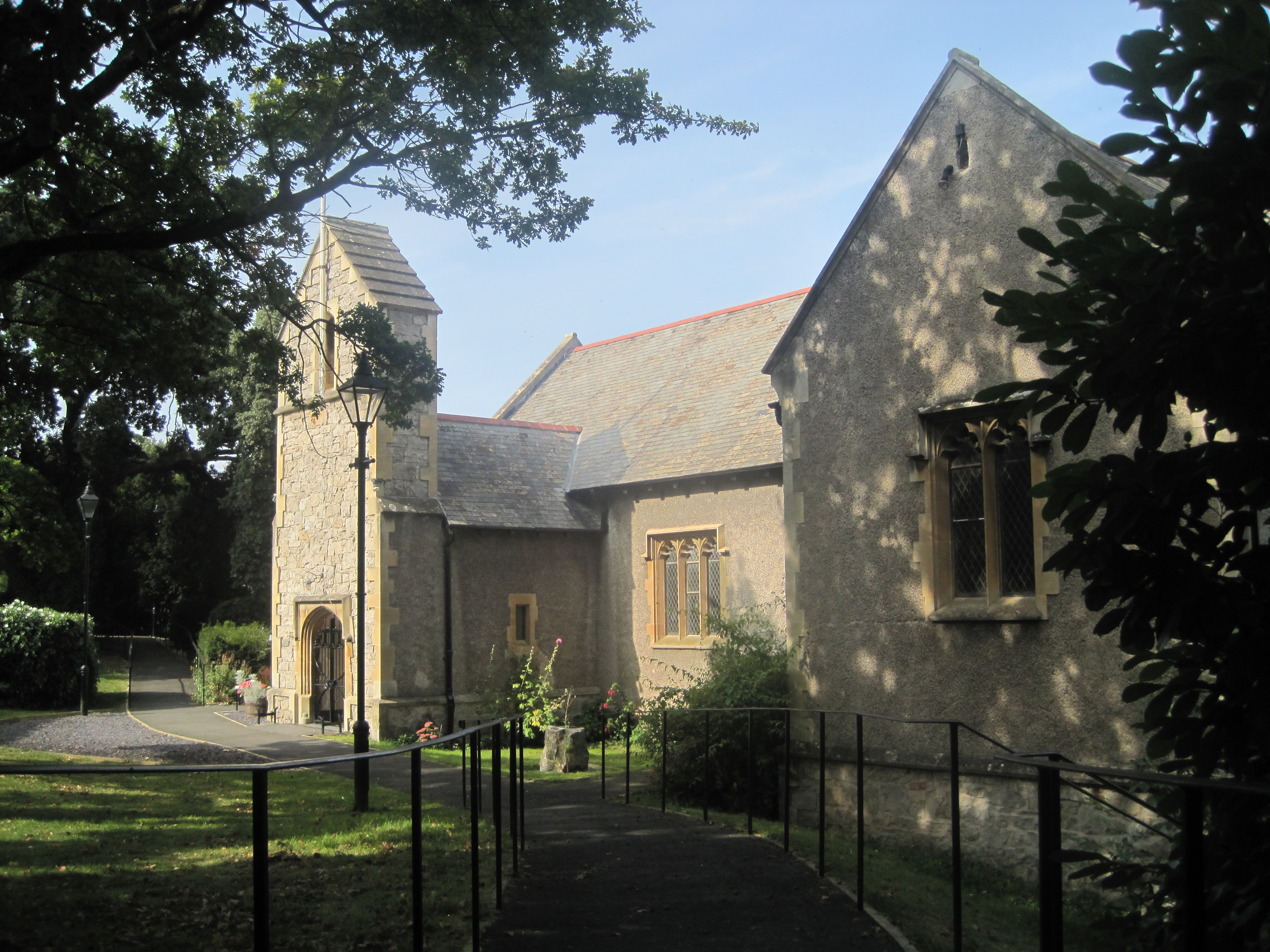

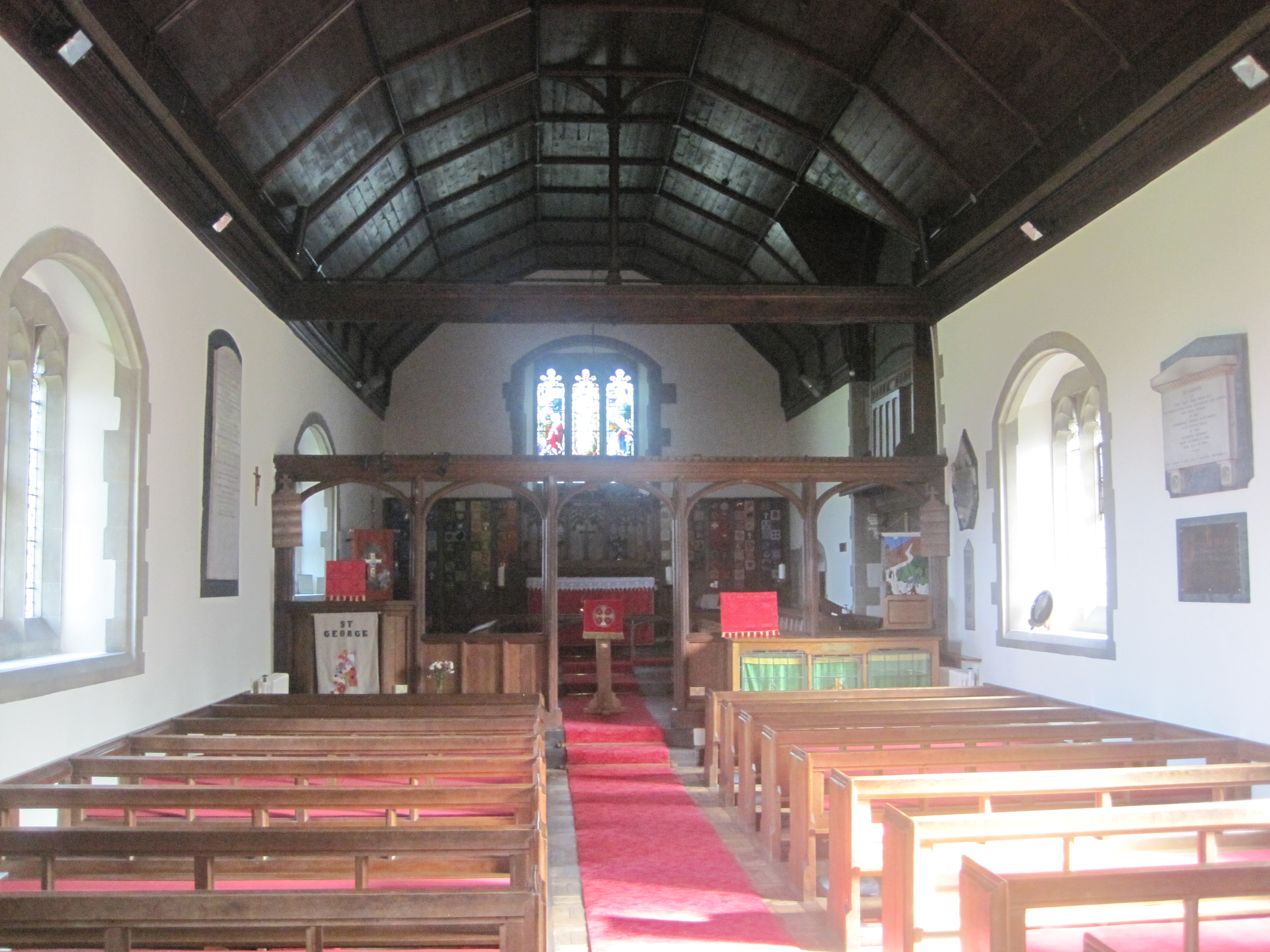

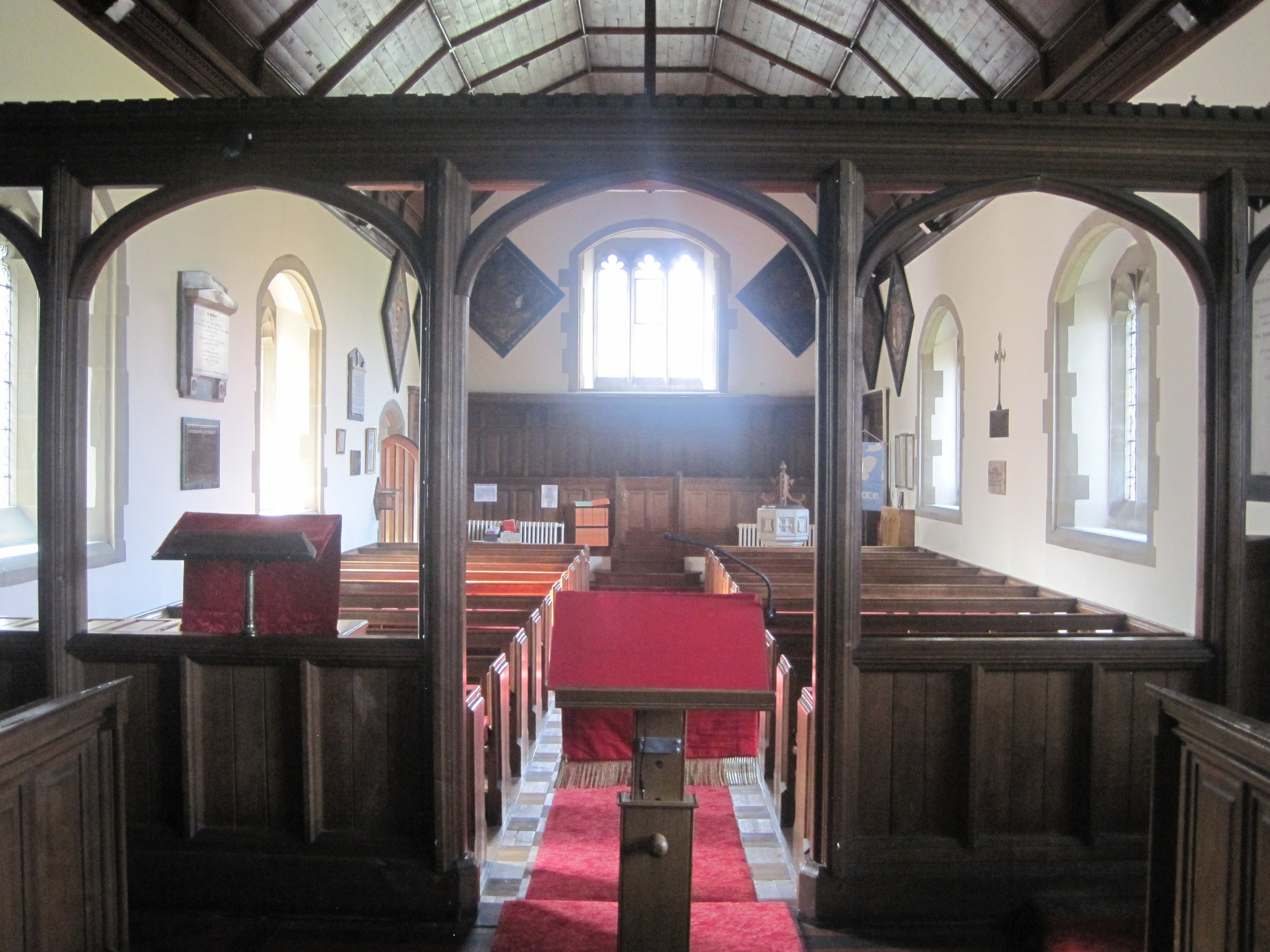

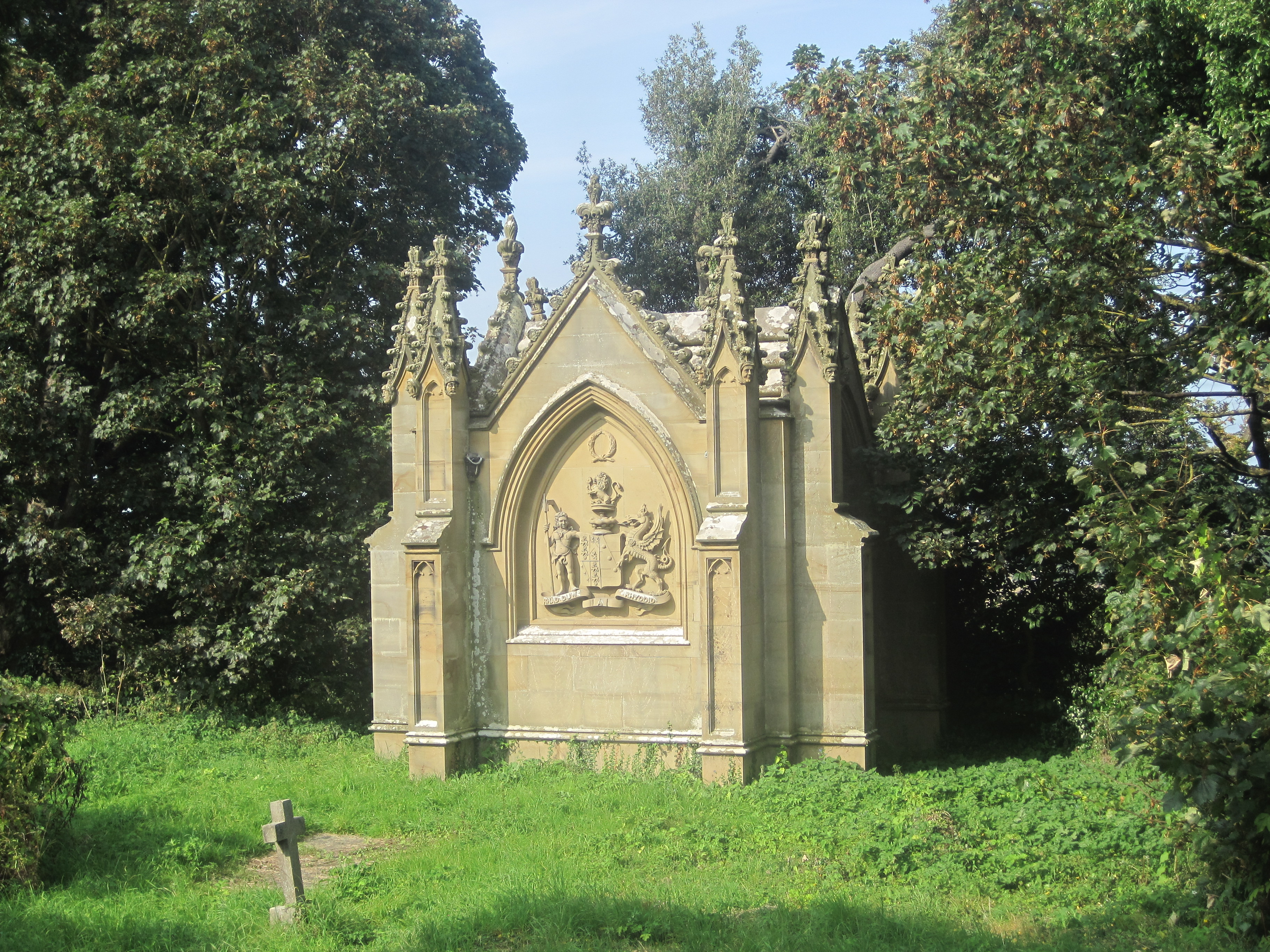

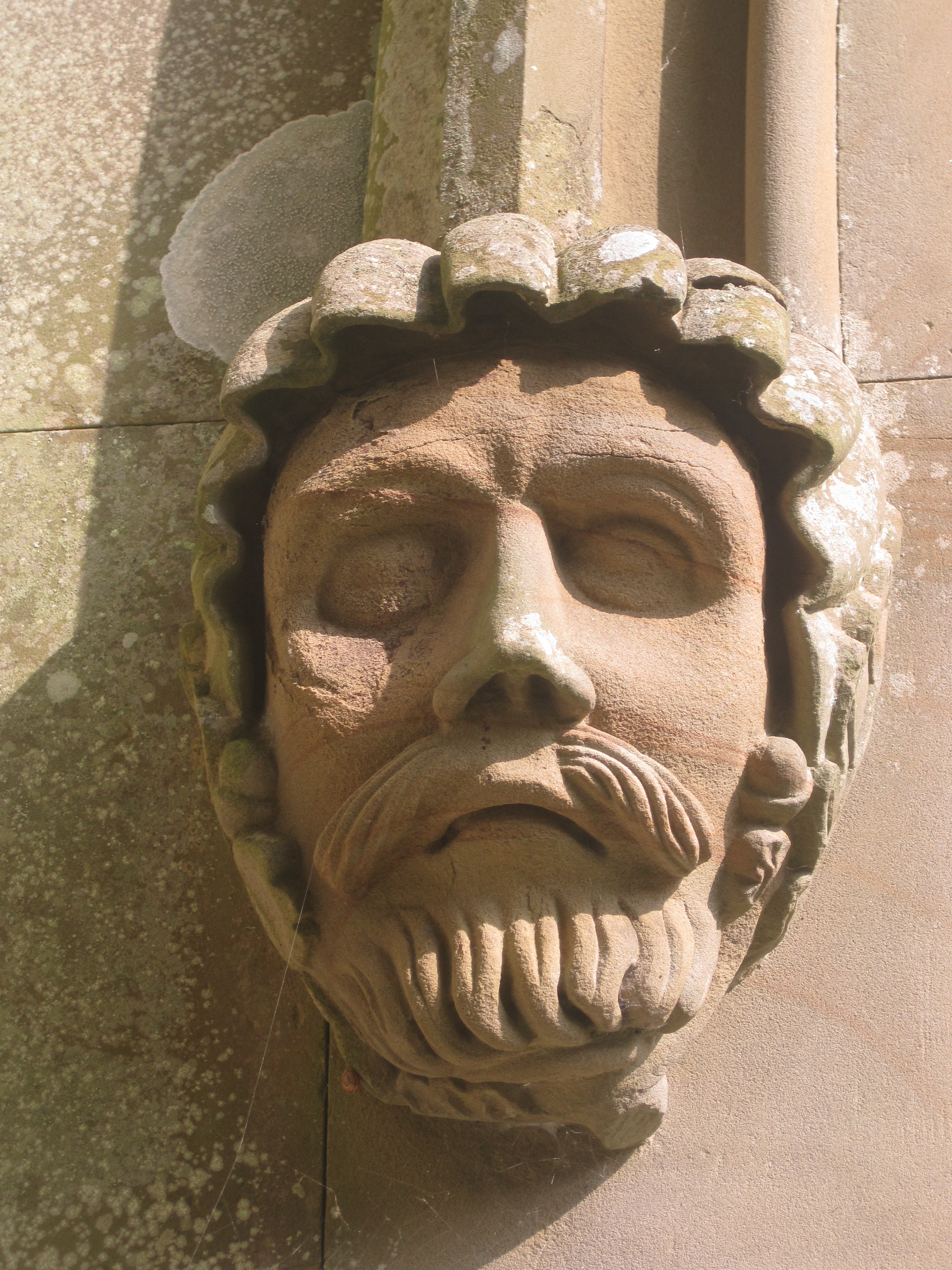

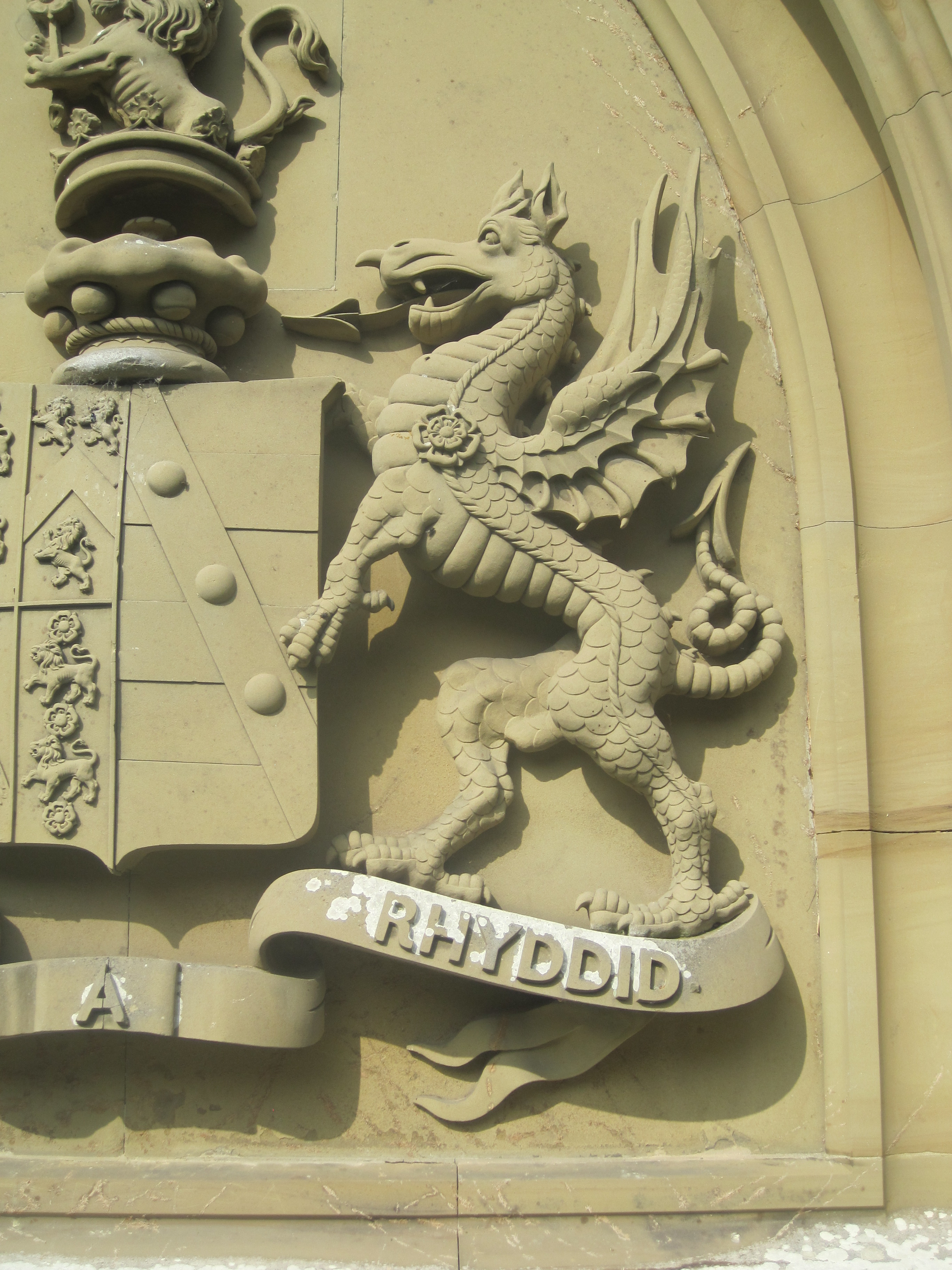

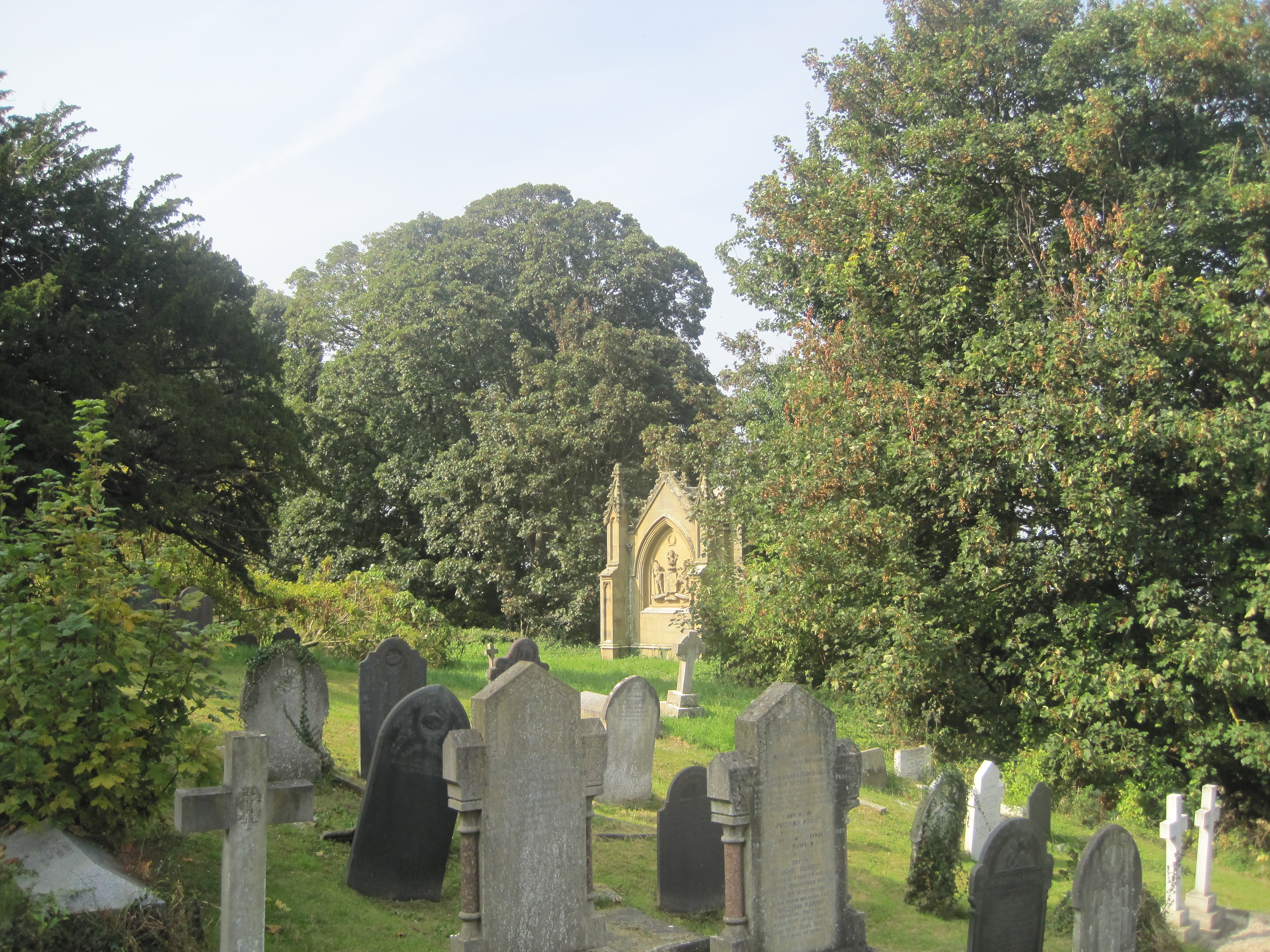

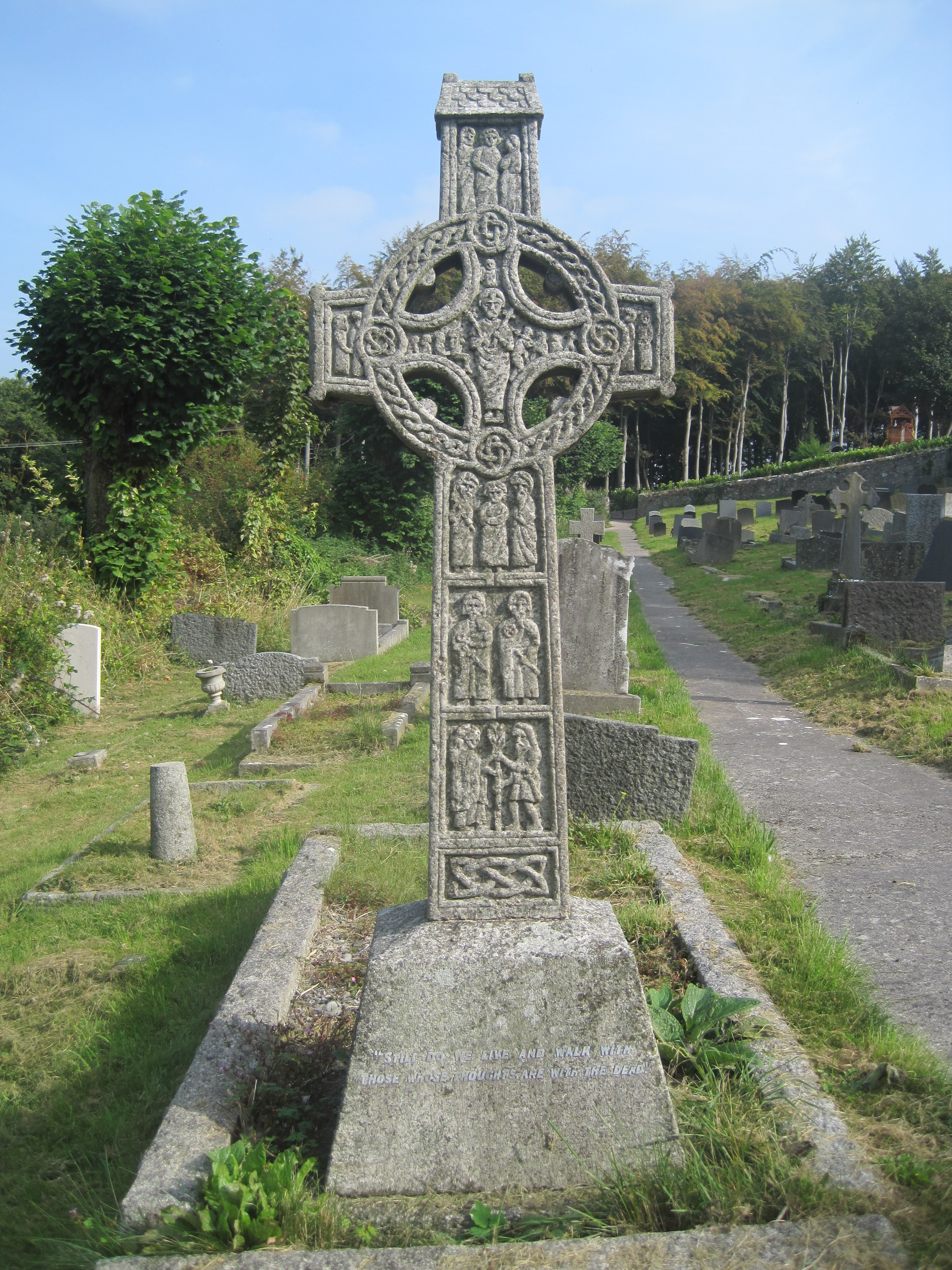
