= Rhyd y Foel =

Village in Conwy County Borough, Wales

Coordinates: 53.276°N 3.632°W

Rhyd-y-foel
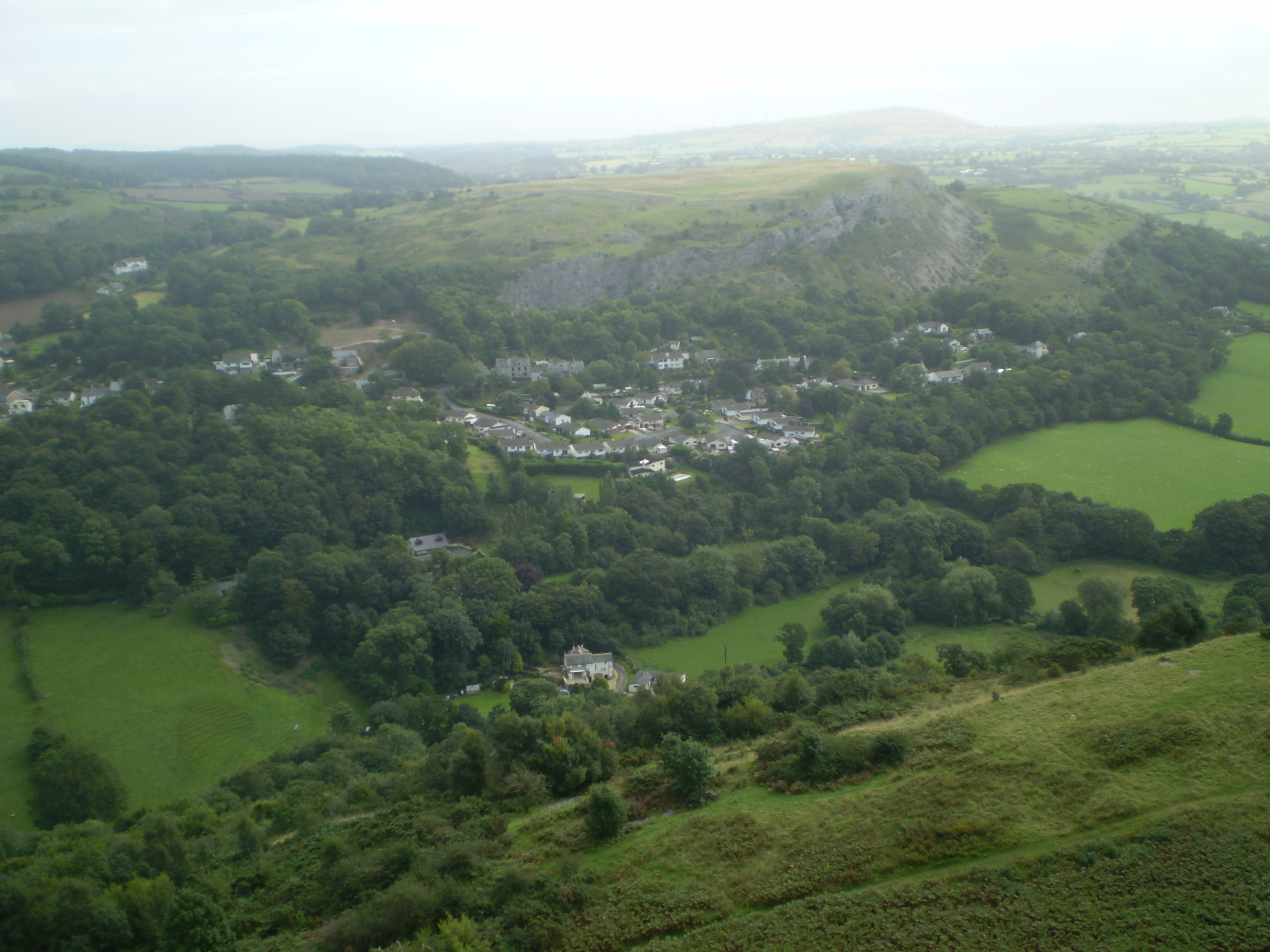
- Rhyd-y-foel from Craig y Forwyn

- Location within Conwy
- OS grid reference: SH911767
- Community: Llanddulas and Rhyd-y-foel
- Principal area: Conwy
- Country: Wales
- Sovereign state: United Kingdom
- Post town: ABERGELE
- Postcode district: LL22
- Dialling code: 01492
- Police: North Wales
- Fire: North Wales
- Ambulance: Welsh
- UK Parliament: Clwyd North
- Senedd Cymru – Welsh Parliament: Clwyd West

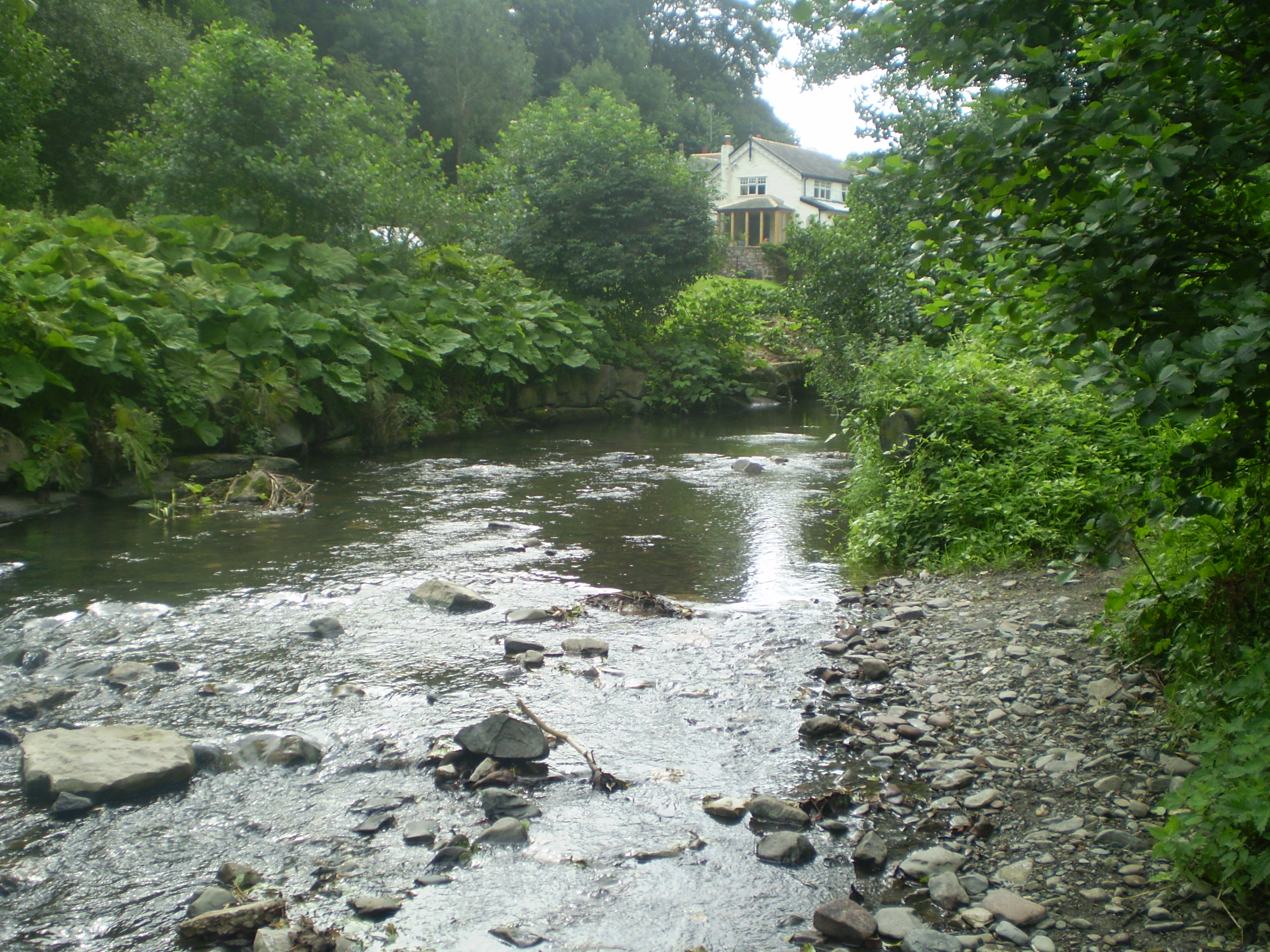
River Dulas at Rhyd y Foel

Rhyd-y-foel is a small village near the coast of north Wales in the area of Rhos in the County Borough of Conwy, Wales.

It is named after the old ford (Welsh: rhyd) over the River Dulas.

It lies at the foot of the western slopes of Pen y Corddyn Mawr, an Iron Age hillfort on the River Dulas, about a mile south of the village of Llanddulas. It is a rural area, with Abergele to the east and Betws yn Rhos to the south.
