= Plas Dulas =

Historic mansion in north Wales

- Plas Dulas in the 1930s, with owner Richard MacGillivray Dawkins and family members
- Interactive map of the Plas Dulas area

General information
- Location: Plas Dulas, Llanddulas, Conwy, Wales
- Coordinates: 53.28775°N 3.64136°W
- Year built: 1840s
- Demolished: 2024
- Owner: Elizabeth Easthope; Richard MacGillivray Dawkins

Technical details
- Material: Stone; slate roof
- Floor count: Two-storey

Plas Dulas was a historic mansion in Llanddulas, Conwy, north Wales, with literary associations.

Plas Dulas stood in the Garthewin estate, as part of a large farm, Llyndir. In the early 19th century, the Wynne family sold the land to Elizabeth Easthope, daughter of Sir John Easthope, using money from her elder brother's will, after she won a court case with her father. John Easthope was a politician and owner of The Morning Chronicle newspaper. He employed the writer Charles Dickens, who may have been a visitor to Plas Dulas. The house was built around 1840. Elizabeth Easthope also bought her sister and brother-in-law a neighbouring property, Bodhyfryd. They were art collectors, and some of their paintings are now in the collections of the Victoria and Albert Museum in London.

The house was passed on through the family, finally owned by the academic Richard MacGillivray Dawkins. He knew the author Evelyn Waugh, who was a frequent visitor to Plas Dulas and wrote the 1928 book Decline and Fall while staying there in the 1920s. In 1925, Waugh taught at Arnold House, a former nearby private school in Llanddulas, and this inspired the fictional Llanabba Castle school in the novel. Dawkins was also a friend of Noël Coward, another visitor to Plas Dulas. Dawkins was interested in Greek plants and created Mediterranean gardens at Plas Dulas.

After Dawkins's death in 1955, the house was bought by a Miss Fekete, a Hungarian and Christian missionary. She used Plas Dulas as a Christian retreat. She died without leaving a will in the late 1990s, by which time the house was in a dilapidated state. The house became derelict in November 1999 and was occupied by squatters, with the idea of creating a community centre. However, they were evicted and the house sold. Attempts to pull down the house for development failed even on appeal, but eventually the house was demolished in 2024.
