= Decline and Fall =

1928 novel by Evelyn Waugh

- First edition cover
- Author: Evelyn Waugh
- Illustrator: Evelyn Waugh
- Language: English
- Genre: Satire
- Publisher: Chapman and Hall
- Publication date: 1928
- Publication place: United Kingdom
- Dewey Decimal: 823.912
- Followed by: Vile Bodies

Decline and Fall is the first novel by the English author Evelyn Waugh, first published in 1928. It was Waugh's first published novel; an earlier attempt, titled The Temple at Thatch, was destroyed by Waugh while still in manuscript form. Partly, Decline and Fall is based on Waugh's schooldays at Lancing College, undergraduate years at Hertford College (Oxford), and his experience as a teacher at Arnold House, a former private school in north Wales. It is a social satire that employs the author's characteristic black humour in lampooning various features of British society in the 1920s.

The novel was written at Plas Dulas in north Wales, while staying with the archaeologist Richard MacGillivray Dawkins (who specialised in Greek archaeology). In 1925, he taught at Arnold House preparatory school, nearby in the village of Llanddulas, and his experience during this time influenced the fictional school Llanabba Castle in the novel.

The novel's title is a contraction of Edward Gibbon's The History of the Decline and Fall of the Roman Empire. Additionally, the title alludes also to the German philosopher Oswald Spengler's The Decline of the West (1918–1922), which first appeared in an English translation in 1926 and which argued, among other things, that the rise of nations and cultures is inevitably followed by their eclipse. Waugh read both Gibbon and Spengler while writing his first novel.

Waugh's satire is unambiguously hostile to much that was in vogue in the late 1920s, and "themes of cultural confusion, moral disorientation and social bedlam ... both drive the novel forward and fuel its humour". This "undertow of moral seriousness provides a crucial tension within [Waugh's novels], but it does not dominate them". Waugh himself stated in his author's note to the first edition "Please bear in mind throughout that IT IS MEANT TO BE FUNNY".

In the text of the 1962 Uniform Edition of the novel, Waugh restored a number of words and phrases that he had been asked to suppress for the first edition.

The novel was dedicated to Harold Acton, "in homage and affection".

== Plot summary ==
Modest and unassuming theology student Paul Pennyfeather falls victim to the drunken antics of the Bollinger Club and is subsequently expelled from Oxford for running through the grounds of Scone College without his trousers. Having thereby defaulted on the conditions of his inheritance, he is forced to take a job teaching at an obscure private school in Wales called Llanabba, run by Dr Fagan. Paul soon discovers that the other masters are all failures in life.

Attracted to the mother of one of his pupils, a wealthy widow called the Honourable Margot Beste-Chetwynde, he is delighted to be hired by her as tutor to her son during the vacation. Living in her moderne country mansion, he becomes aware of her lovers and drug use but fails to realise that her business is running a chain of high-class brothels in Latin America. She however wants to marry him. First, he has to fly to Marseille, where a consignment of her girls bound for Brazil has been held up by the police, who need bribing. Paul's activities there are shadowed by his college friend, Potts, who now works for the League of Nations investigating human trafficking.

Back in London, he is arrested on the morning of the wedding and, taking the fall to protect his fiancée's honour, is sentenced to seven years in prison for traffic in prostitution. In jail, he meets several former staff from Llanabba, which has been closed. Unable to wait seven years, Margot marries a government minister, who arranges for Paul to be rushed from prison to a private clinic for an urgent operation. The clinic is run by Dr Fagan, who certifies that Paul died under anaesthetic and puts him on a boat to Greece.

Deciding to resume his interrupted theological studies, Paul grows a heavy moustache and applies under his own name to Scone, saying he is a distant cousin of the dead criminal. The novel ends as it started, with Paul sitting in his room listening to the distant shouts of the Bollinger Club.

== Critical reception ==
The Guardian, in 1928, praised the book as "a great lark; its author has an agreeable sense of comedy and characterisation, and the gift of writing smart and telling conversation, while his drawings are quite in tune with the spirit of the tale". The newspaper also compared the superficial presentation in the novel to that employed by P. G. Wodehouse. Arnold Bennett hailed it as "an uncompromising and brilliantly malicious satire" and the writer John Mortimer called it Waugh's "most perfect novel ... a ruthlessly comic plot."

In his biography of Waugh, journalist Christopher Sykes recalled, "I was in a nursing home when Decline and Fall came out, and Tom Driberg visited me and brought a copy. He began to read out some favourite passages and was literally unable to read them to the end because he and I were so overcome by laughter."

In a 2009 episode of Desert Island Discs, the British actor and comedian David Mitchell named Decline and Fall as the book he would take to a desert island, calling it "one of the funniest books I've ever read" and "exactly the sort of novel I would like to have written."

== In other media ==
The novel was dramatised as the 1969 film Decline and Fall... of a Birdwatcher, starring Robin Phillips, and also by Jeremy Front in a 2008 BBC Radio 4 production starring Alistair McGowan as Pennyfeather, Jim Broadbent as Grimes, Andrew Sachs as Prendergast, Edward Hardwicke as Dr. Fagan, Jonathan Kidd as Philbrick, Joanna David as Margot Beste-Chetwynde, Emma Fielding as Flossie, and Richard Pearce as Peter.

It was dramatised again in 2015 by BBC Radio 4, with Kieran Hodgson as Pennyfeather, Emilia Fox as Margot, Tom Hollander as Otto, John Sessions as Grimes, Alex Lawther as Peter, James Fleet as Prendergast and Geoffrey Whitehead as Fagan.

In 2017, the BBC produced a three-part TV dramatisation starring Jack Whitehall as Paul Pennyfeather, David Suchet as Dr Fagan, Eva Longoria as Margot Beste-Chetwynde, Douglas Hodge as Captain Grimes, and Vincent Franklin as Mr Prendergast. The production was the book's first television adaptation, and received largely positive reviews. Alastair Mckay with the Evening Standard called it "delicately constructed and pitch-perfect." Ellen E. Jones remarked on the show's "many enjoyable performances," especially that of Hodge as the "drink-soaked deviant" Captain Grimes, adding, "Give him a spin-off series immediately."
