= Abergele =

Market town and community in Wales

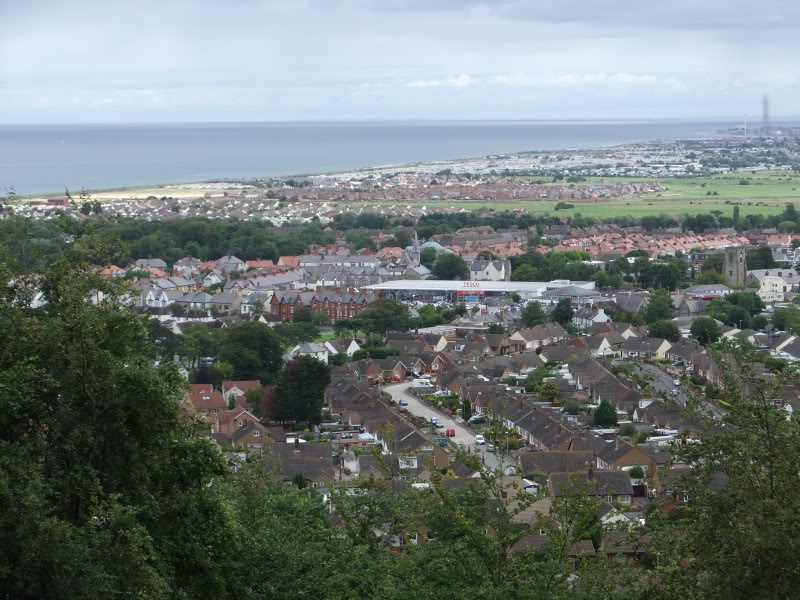
- Abergele from Tan-y-Gopa

- Location within Conwy
- Population: 11,290 (Community, 2021); 8,535 (Built up area, 2021)
- OS grid reference: SH945775
- Community: Abergele
- Principal area: Conwy
- Preserved county: Clwyd
- Country: Wales
- Sovereign state: United Kingdom
- Post town: ABERGELE
- Postcode district: LL22
- Dialling code: 01745
- Police: North Wales
- Fire: North Wales
- Ambulance: Welsh
- UK Parliament: Clwyd North
- Senedd Cymru – Welsh Parliament: Clwyd West
- List of places UK Wales Conwy 53.28°N 3.58°W Map of the community

Abergele (Welsh: [ˌabɛrˈɡɛlɛ];) is a market town and community, situated on the north coast of Wales between the holiday resorts of Colwyn Bay and Rhyl, in Conwy County Borough. It lies within the historic county boundaries of Denbighshire. Its northern suburb of Pensarn lies on the Irish Sea coast. The town is served by Abergele and Pensarn railway station, which is by the coast at Pensarn.

== Etymology ==
The meaning of the name Abergele can be deduced by aber being the Welsh word for estuary, river mouth or confluence and Gele the name of the river which flows through the town. Gele is a dialectal form of gelau, which means spear, describing the action or speed of the river cutting through the land.

== Geography ==
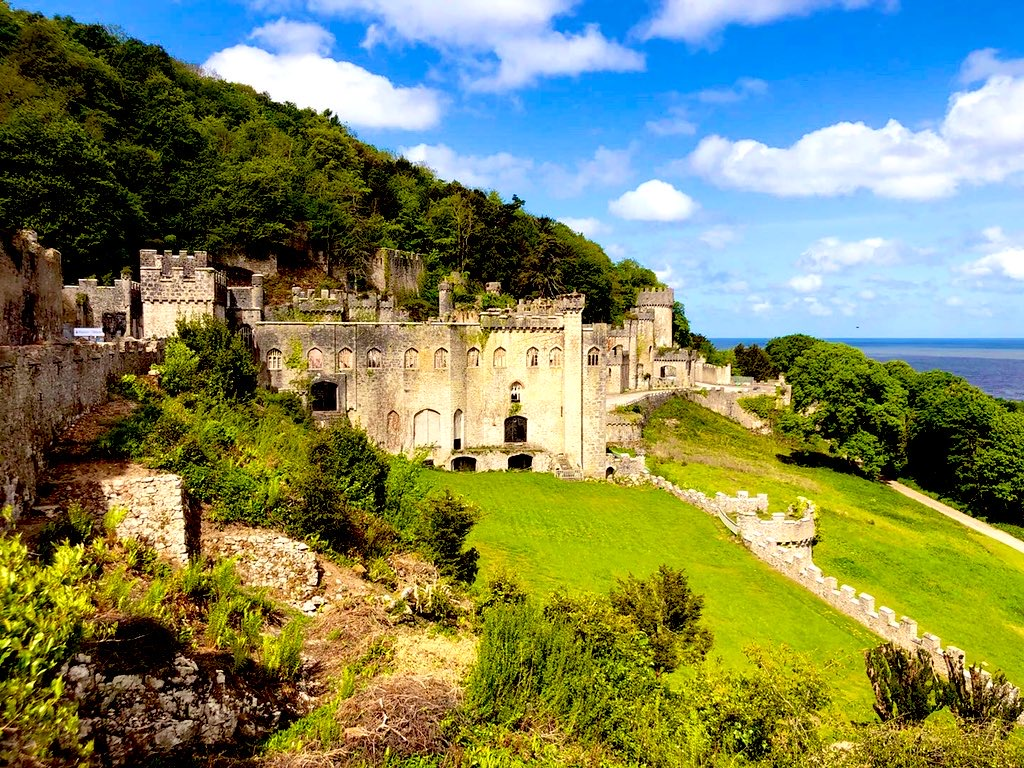
Gwrych Castle

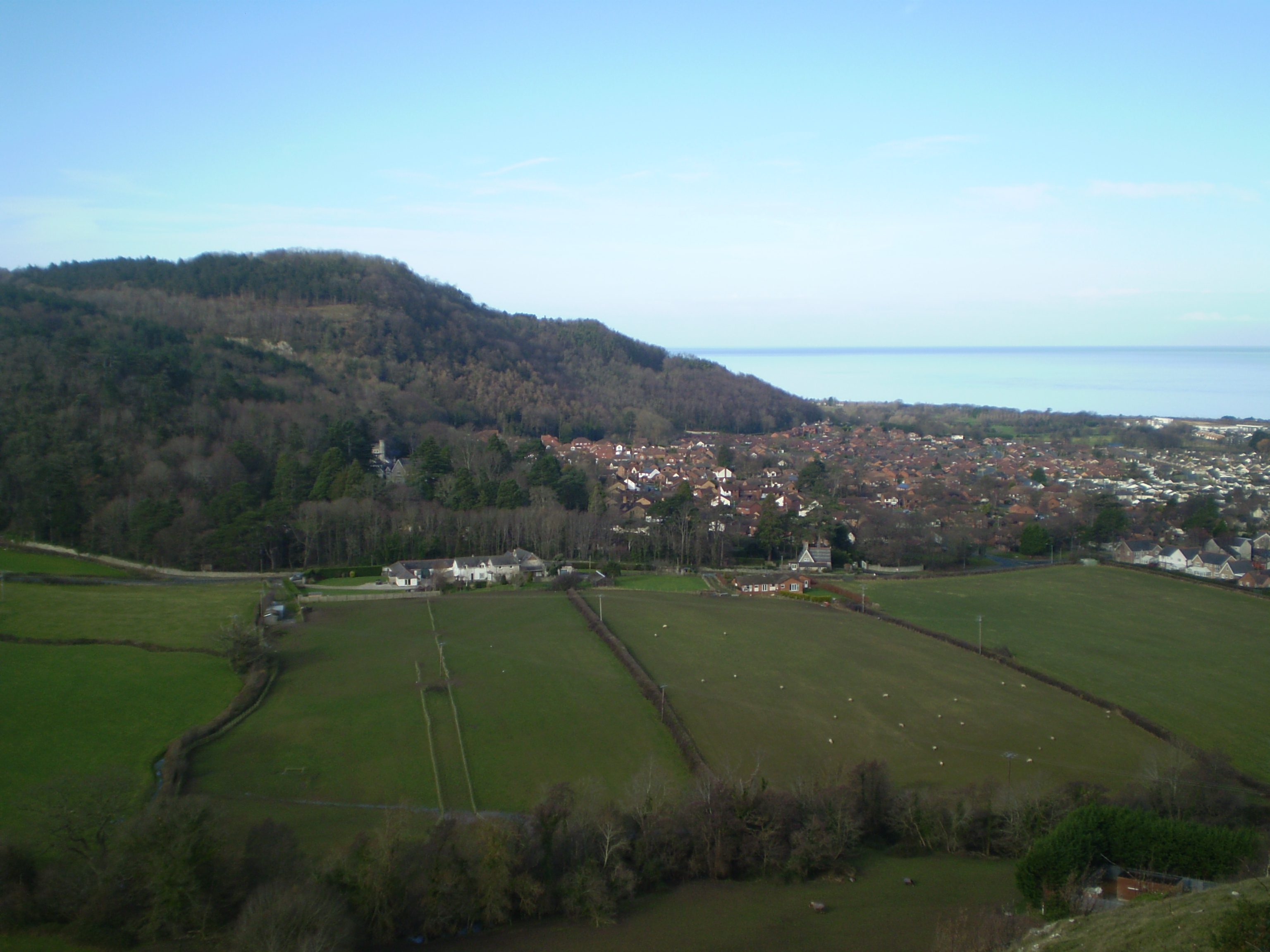
Hill which the hillfort of Castell Cawr is situated

The town itself lies on the A55 road and is known for Gwrych Castle. The highest hill is Moelfre Isaf (1040 ft) to the south of the town.

There are views from Cefn-yr-Ogof (669 ft), Gallt-y-Felin-Wynt (Tower Hill) (587 ft) and Castell Cawr (known locally as Tan y Gopa and nicknamed 'Lôn garu' (Lover's Lane)) which is 189 metres (620 feet). Castell Cawr is an Iron Age hillfort, one of several in the area. Dinorben hillfort to the east of town was destroyed in the 1980s.

At the 2021 census, the community had a population of 11,290, and the Abergele built up area as defined by the Office for National Statistics (which excludes Pensarn, of which there is virtually no gap in the built up area between them) had a population of 8,535.

Nearby villages include St George, Betws yn Rhos, Rhyd-y-foel, Belgrano, Llanddulas and Llanfair Talhaearn.

== History ==
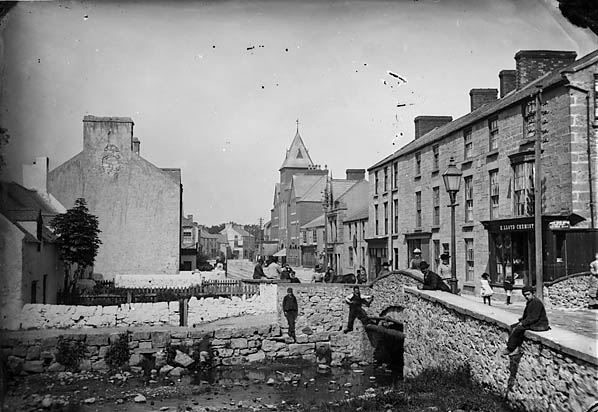
Bridge Street, Abergele circa 1875

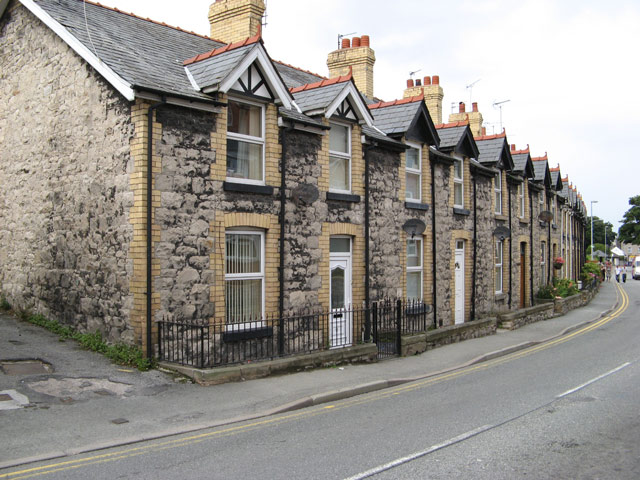
Cottages in Abergele

"I have observed, at low-water, far from the clayey banks, a long tract of hard loam, filled with the bodies of oak trees, tolerably entire; but so soft as to be cut with a knife as easily as wax. The wood is collected by the poorer people, and after being brought to dry upon the beach, is carried home and used as fuel; but, in burning, it emits a very bad smell."

— Excerpt from 'Tours in Wales with Notes' by Thomas Pennant (1726 - 1798), Edited by John Rhŷs - 1883

=== Celtic and early Welsh history ===
Abergele was the site of an important clas (Celtic monastery) and remained settled into the 13th century. A "Prince Jonathan of Abergeleu" is listed by the B text of the Annals of Wales as dying during the 9th century reign of Rhodri the Great, although Charles-Edwards has supposed him to have simply been the monastery's abbot. Edward I is known to have briefly stayed there in December 1294 during his invasion of Wales to suppress the revolt of Madog ap Llywelyn.

Sites of historical interest include two Iron Age hillforts; Castell Cawr at Tan y Gopa and Dinorben (now virtually disappeared owing to limestone quarrying) at St. George. On Gallt y Felin Wynt, a hill above the town known as Bryn Tŵr or by its English name 'Tower Hill', is a 17th-century windmill, partially restored in 1930. There is another Iron Age fort at Pen y Corddyn Mawr hill above Rhyd y Foel. There is also another watchtower, 'Tŵr Arglwyddes Emily' or 'Lady Emily's Tower', which is located near Cefn yr Ogof.

=== Gwrych Castle ===
Gwrych Castle was built between 1819 and 1825 at the behest of Lloyd Hesketh Bamford-Hesketh. From 1894 until 1946 it was the residence of the Dundonald family. Gwrych Castle's present owner, California businessman Nick Tavaglione, who bought the landmark in December 1989, put Gwrych up for auction on 2 June 2006, but it failed to sell. The condition of the property is being monitored by the Gwrych Castle Preservation Trust. It is undergoing renovation.

The boxers Bruce Woodcock (in the late 1940s) and Randolph Turpin (in 1952) trained at Gwrych Castle. The film Prince Valiant, was filmed there in 1996, starring Edward Fox and Katherine Heigl.

=== St. Michael's Parish Church ===
In a Welsh antiquarian book from 1860, it mentions that there has always been a 'local tradition or popular opinion that the original Abergele was overwhelmed by the sea' and that an inscribed stone at St Michael's parish church (built on the site of the old clas) which was once readable but had been weathered over time read;

"Yma mae'n gorwedd,
Yn mynwent Mihangel,
Gwr oedd ei annedd,
Dair milltir yn y gogledd"

Although through oral tradition, the elders believed that the weathered stone was a modern copy of the original which could be found on the other side of the wall which was far more weathered and illegible. In 1890's, a third (bilingual) copy was made and presented by Mrs Taylor of Dolhyfryd and the vicar, David Evans. The updated inscription (with slightly altered text) on the tombstone reads in order:

"YMA MAE'N GORWEDD YN MONWENT MIHANGEL WR OEDD A'I ANNEDD DAIR MILLTIR I'R GOGLEDD"

"HERE LIETH IN ST. MICHAEL's CHURCHYARD A MAN WHO HAD HIS DWELLING THREE MILES TO THE NORTH"

As the sea is little more than half a mile away at this point, this suggests that the sea has made some considerable advance over the centuries.

Outside the church is a penitential stone where sinners had to do penance by standing, dressed in white, by the stone and beseech the congregation for mercy as they entered and left the church.

=== Railway disaster ===
In 1868 the railway line through Abergele was the site of the worst railway disaster in Britain to that time. The result of a series of circumstances, errors and failures led to loose wagons containing barrels of paraffin, detached from another train at nearby Llanddulas, rolling down towards Abergele. The Irish Mail train from Euston to Holyhead ran into them. Its leading coaches were enveloped in flame which burned occupants alive. In all 33 people died.

An inquest was held a few days after and ran until early September of the same year. It concluded that it was no accident and that the two brakesmen of the goods train to which the petroleum wagons had previously been attached were to blame, and the deaths were manslaughter.

=== Other ===
Abergele Sanatorium was built just outside Abergele in 1910; it became a community hospital in the 1980s.

On 30 June 1969, the evening before the investiture of the Prince of Wales in Caernarfon, two members of Mudiad Amddiffyn Cymru (lit. 'movement for the defence of Wales'; MAC), Alwyn Jones and George Taylor, were killed when the bomb they were planting outside government offices exploded prematurely.

In 2020 Abergele hosted the 20th edition of I'm a Celebrity...Get Me Out of Here! at Gwrych Castle, and in 2021 it hosted the 21st series due to the Covid pandemic restrictions in Australia.

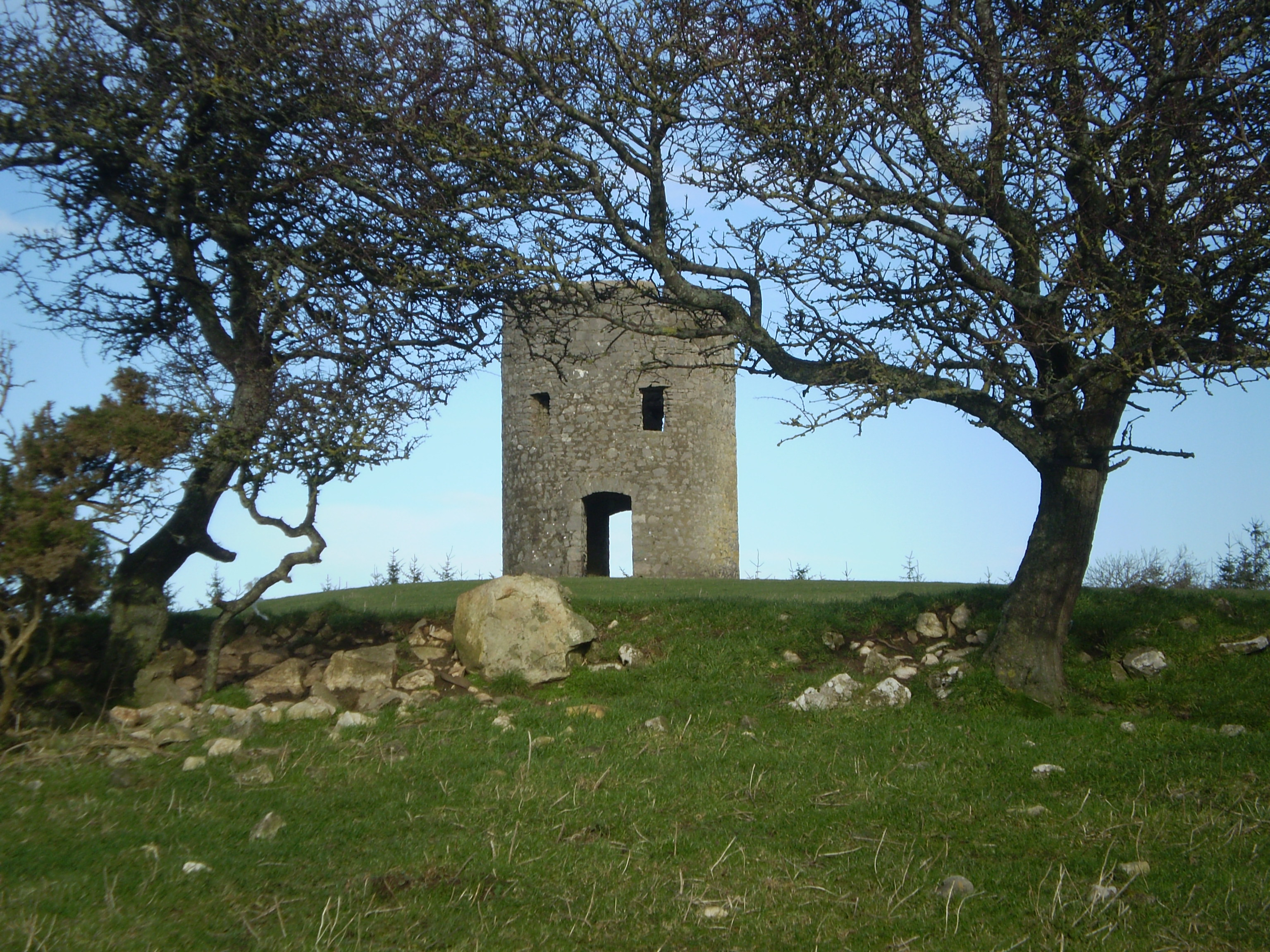
Tower on Gallt-y-Felin-Wynt, Abergele

== Governance ==
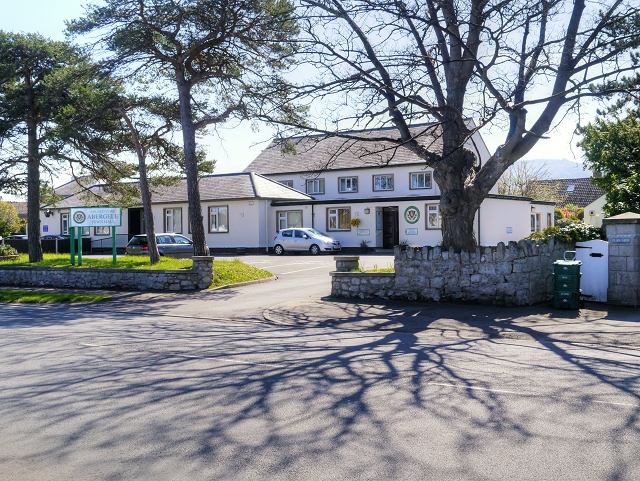
Town Hall, Llanddulas Road

There are two tiers of local government covering Abergele, at community (town) and county borough level: Abergele Town Council (Cyngor Tref Abergele) and Conwy County Borough Council (Cyngor Bwrdeistref Sirol Conwy). The town council is based at the Town Hall on Llanddulas Road.

=== Administrative history ===
Abergele was an ancient parish. It formed part of the commote of Isdulas, which became part of Denbighshire on the county's creation in 1536 under the Laws in Wales Acts. The parish covered the town itself and surrounding rural areas, including the higher ground to the south of the town and the coastal plain up to the River Clwyd to the east, including Pensarn, Towyn and Kinmel Bay.

In 1865, there was an attempt to create a local government district covering both the settlements of Abergele and Pensarn, but it was not brought into effect. Instead, a smaller district just covering Pensarn was established in 1867. The Pensarn local government district was enlarged in 1876 to also include Abergele, at which point it was renamed 'Abergele and Pensarn'.

Local government districts were reconstituted as urban districts under the Local Government Act 1894. The 1894 Act also directed that civil parishes could no longer straddle district boundaries, and so the old parish of Abergele was divided into a parish called Abergele Urban matching the Abergele and Pensarn Urban District, and a parish called Abergele Rural covering the rest of the old parish. The urban district was substantially enlarged in 1935, taking in Towyn and Kinmel Bay from the Abergele Rural parish, as well as Llanddulas and St George, which had previously both been separate parishes. As part of the 1935 expansion, the urban district was renamed from 'Abergele and Pensarn' to just 'Abergele'.

In 1938, the urban district council bought a large house called Pentre Mawr on Dundonald Avenue (built 1853) to serve as its town hall. The grounds of the house were converted into a public park.

Abergele Urban District was abolished in 1974 under the Local Government Act 1972. The area became part of the new borough of Colwyn in Clwyd. The area of the pre-1974 urban district became a community called Abergele, with its community council taking the name Abergele Town Council. The community was split into three smaller communities in 1983: Abergele, Llanddulas and Rhyd-y-foel, and Kinmel Bay and Towyn. The upper tiers of local government were reorganised again in 1996, when the modern county borough of Conwy was created. Abergele Town Council took over the former magistrates' court on Llanddulas Road to serve as its town hall following the court's closure in 2000.

== Notable people ==
- Felicia Hemans (1793–1835), English poet who grew up at Abergele and later identified herself as 'Welsh by adoption'
- Lloyd Hesketh Bamford-Hesketh (1788–1861), owner of the Gwrych Castle and High Sheriff of Denbighshire in 1828
- Emrys ap Iwan (1848–1906) a Welsh literary critic and writer on politics and religion
- Aylward M. Blackman (1883–1956 in Abergele) Egyptologist, excavated sites in Egypt and Nubia
- Mervyn Roberts (1906–1990), a Welsh composer, known for his piano music
- Ralph Steadman (born 1936), illustrator, best known for his collaboration with the writer Hunter S. Thompson
- David Vaughan (born 1983), footballer with 476 club caps and 42 for Wales
- Georgia Wilson (born 1995), paralympic equestrian
- Jesu, experimental metal band, formed in 2003
