= Cefn yr Ogof =

Hill in Conwy County Borough, Wales

Coordinates: 53.28155°N 3.62732°W

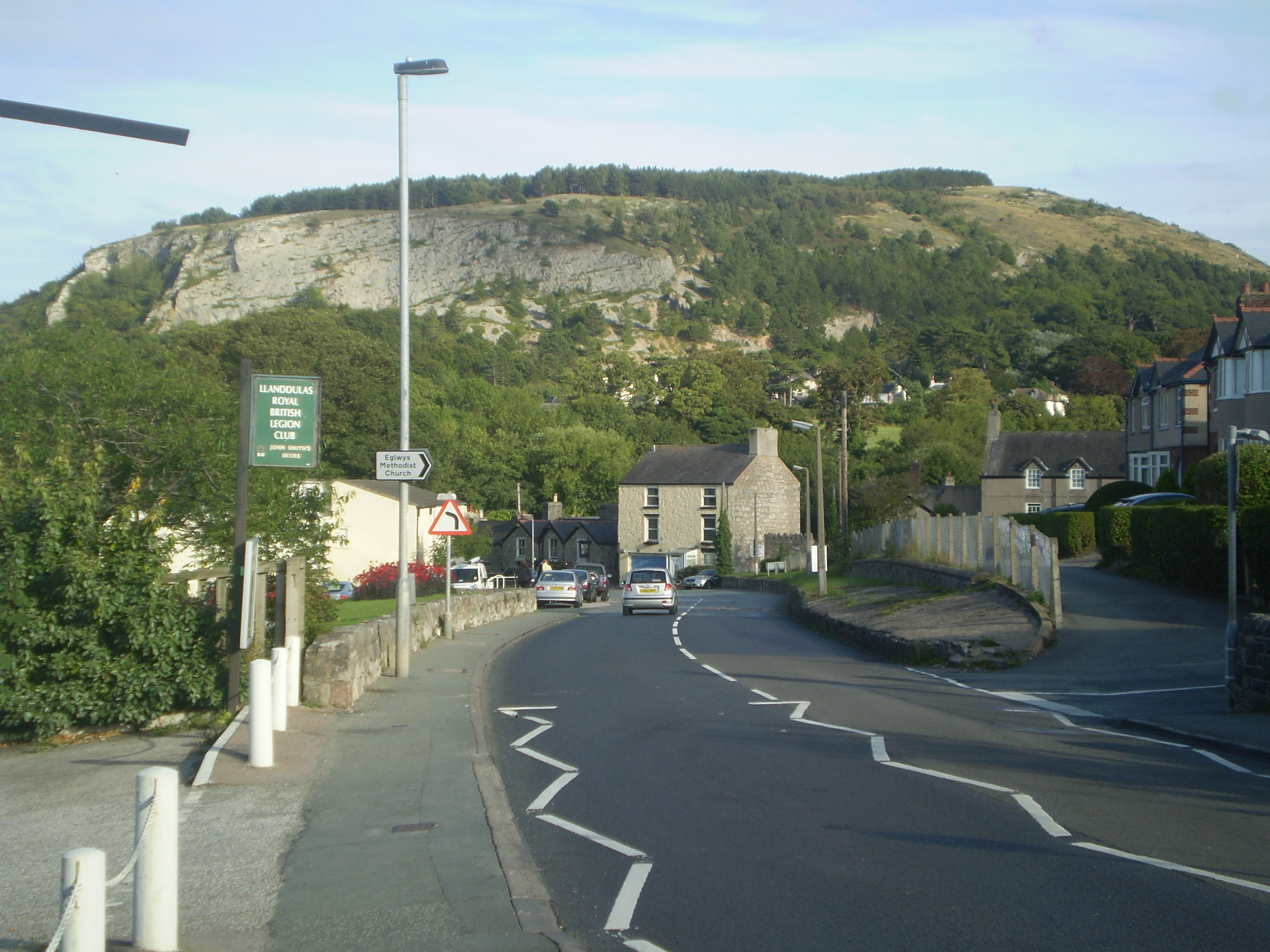
- Cefn-yr-Ogof from Llanddulas

Highest point
- Elevation: 204 m (669 ft)
- Prominence: 102 m (335 ft)
- Parent peak: Mwdwl-eithin
- Listing: HuMP

Geography
- Location: Conwy, Wales
- OS grid: SH916773
- Topo map: OS Landranger 116

Cefn yr Ogof is a hill in Conwy County Borough, Wales. Several caves are situated on the hill. It is the highest point of the hill to the west of Gwrych Castle near Abergele and Llanddulas. Ownership of the hillside is divided into three categories; an area managed by Welsh National Resources on behalf of the National Assembly of Wales, private ownership including the land immediately around Gwrych Castle and the western slopes which are predominantly common land and therefore open access. It is 204 m (669 ft) high, with views towards the Clwydian Hills, Denbigh Moors, (Mynydd Hiraethog) Snowdonia, the Great Orme, Anglesey and the Dulas valley. The name refers to the caves located on the hill. It has recently been promoted to HuMP status, having a prominence of over 100 metres. Large parts of Cefn yr Ogof are designated an SSSI.
