= Llanddulas =

Village in Conwy County Borough, Wales

Coordinates: 53.289°N 3.641°W

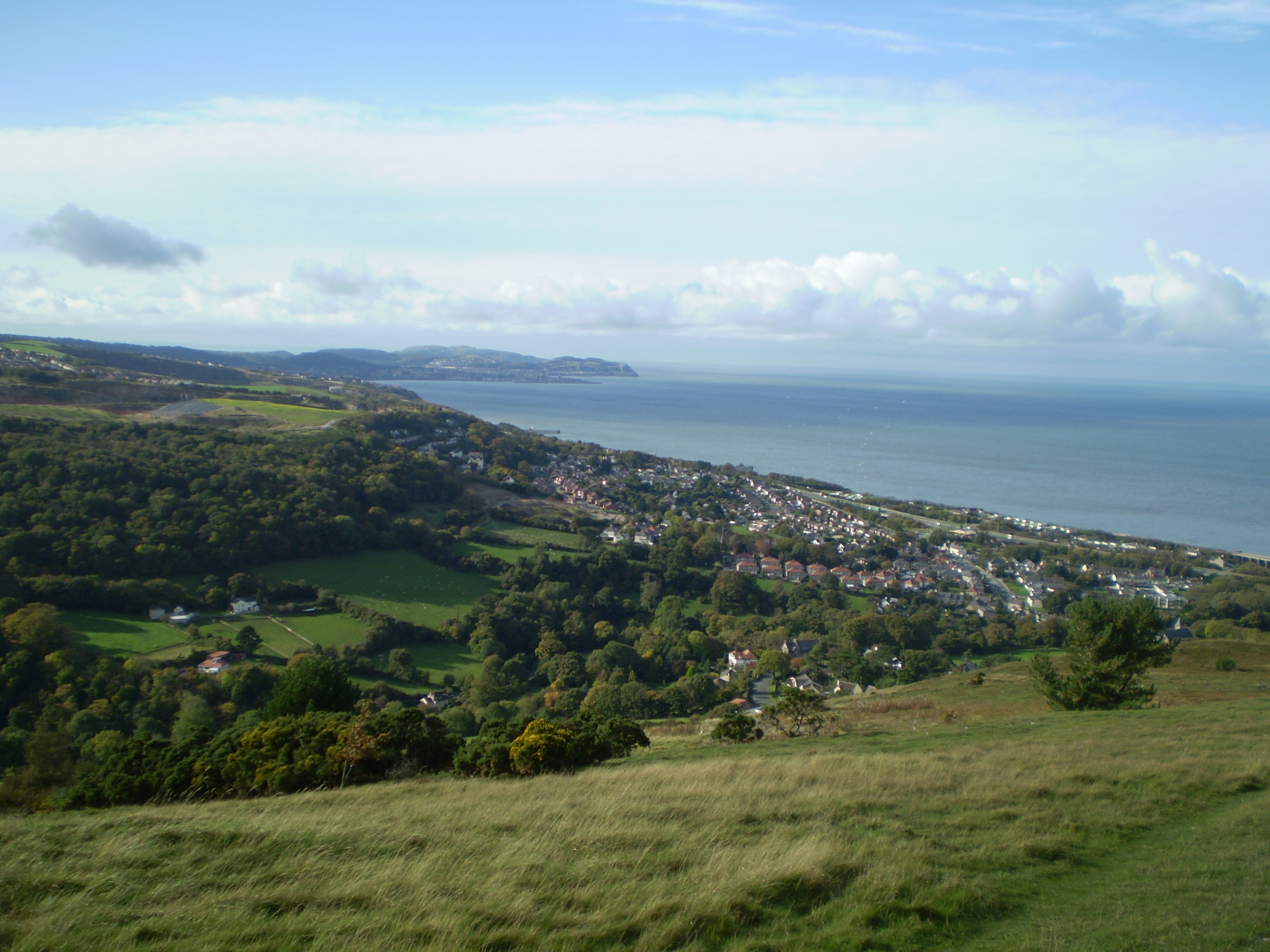
- Llanddulas from Cefn-yr-Ogof

- Location within Conwy
- Population: 1,542 (2011)
- OS grid reference: SH906781
- Community: Llanddulas and Rhyd-y-foel
- Principal area: Conwy
- Country: Wales
- Sovereign state: United Kingdom
- Post town: ABERGELE
- Postcode district: LL22
- Dialling code: 01492
- Police: North Wales
- Fire: North Wales
- Ambulance: Welsh
- UK Parliament: Clwyd North
- Senedd Cymru – Welsh Parliament: Clwyd West

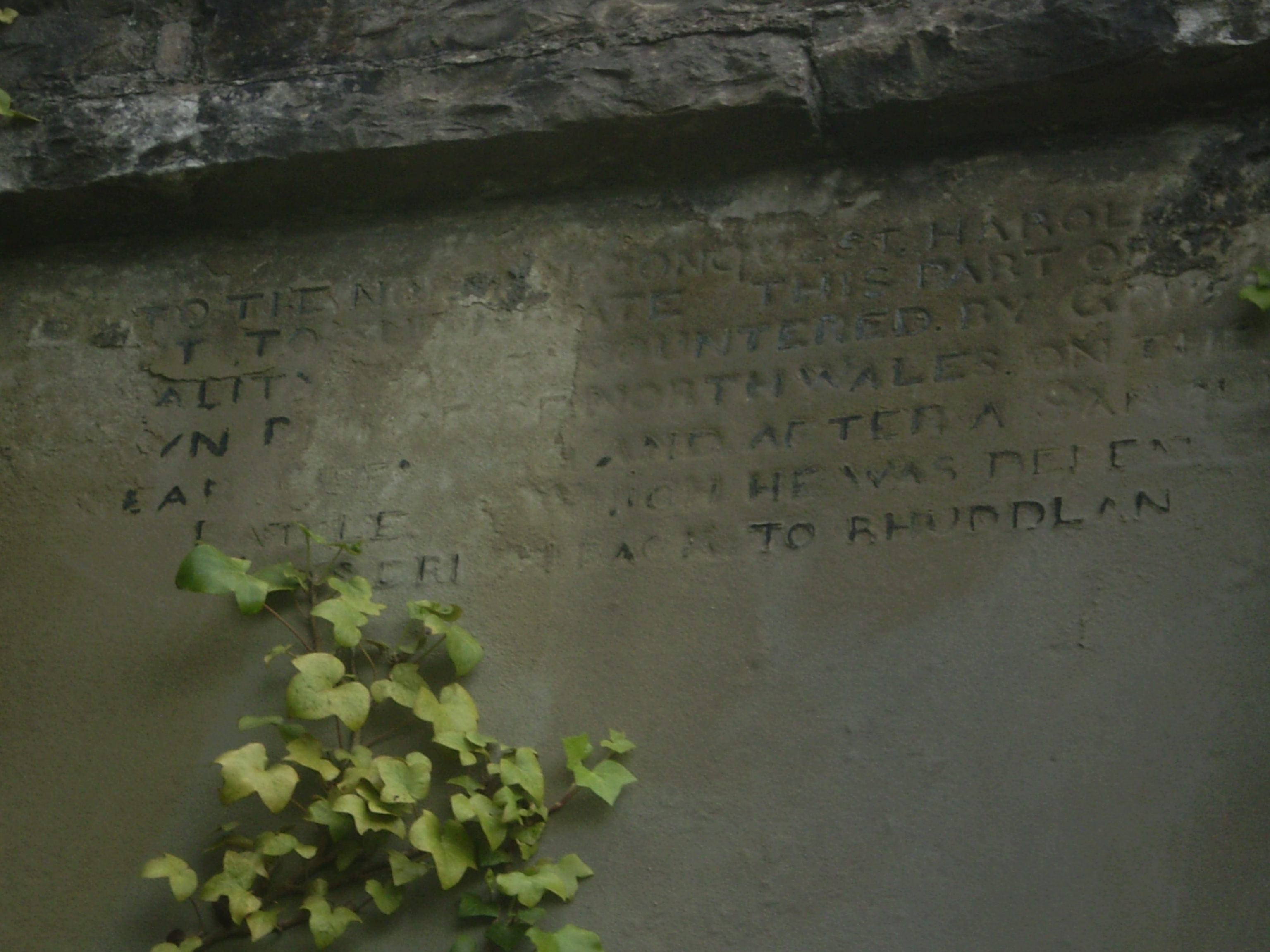
Plaque at Northern Towers

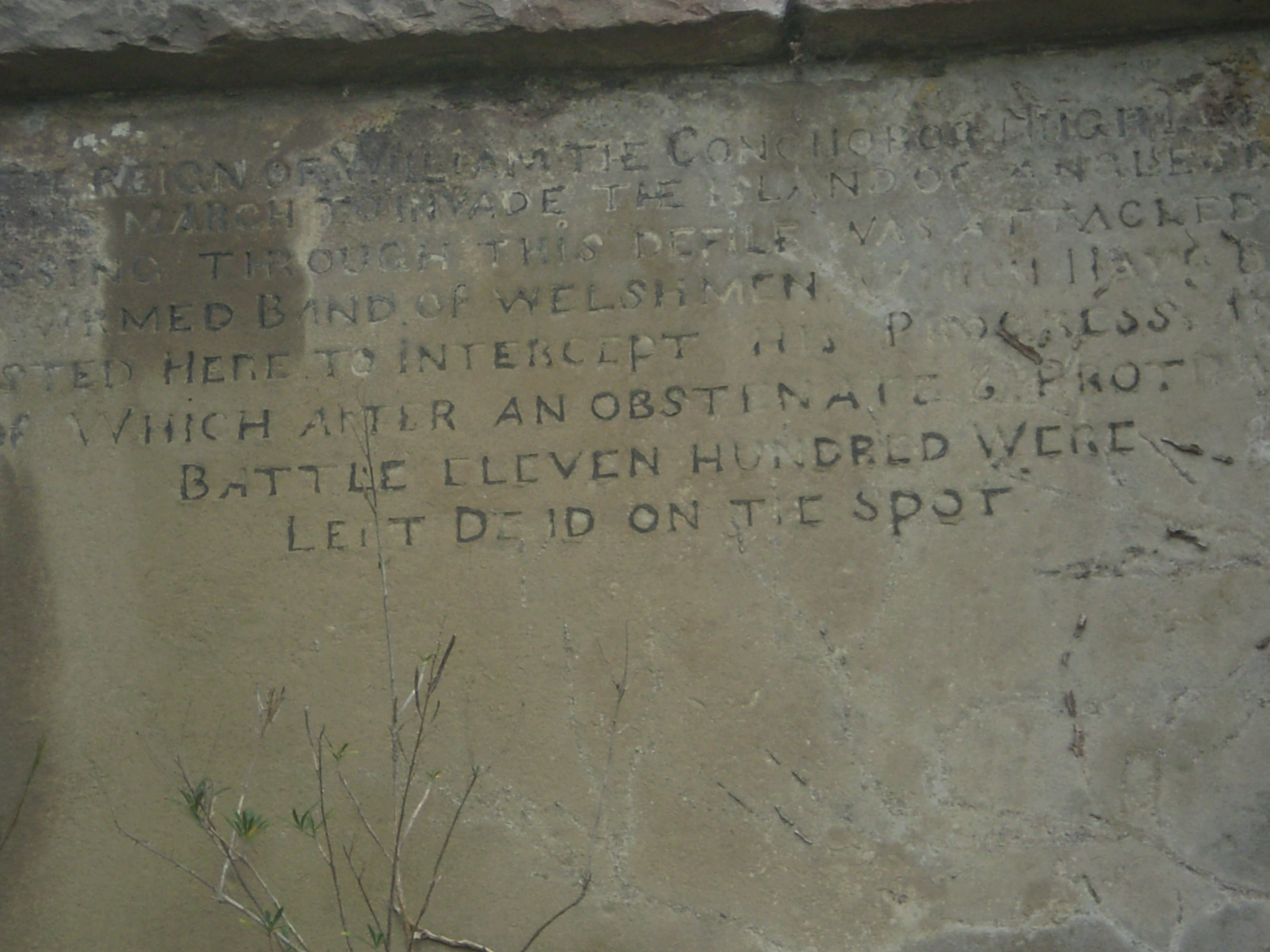
Another of the plaques

Llanddulas is a village in Conwy county borough, Wales, midway between Old Colwyn and Abergele and next to the North Wales Expressway in the community of Llanddulas and Rhyd-y-foel. The village lies beneath the limestone hill of Cefn-yr-Ogof (670 ft). This hill has large caves, and quarrying of limestone was formerly the main industry of the village, with crushed stone being exported from the 200 m long jetty.

According to figures from the 2011 census, Llanddulas, combined with nearby village Rhyd y Foel, had a population of 1,542, with around 23% of the population having some knowledge of the Welsh language.

Llanddulas is notable as being the place where Richard II was betrayed in 1399. and is also the birthplace of Lewis Valentine. Between 1889 and 1952 the village had its own railway station.

According to legend, a cave on the mountain of Pen y Cefn was once the abode of the Devil, until the people of Llanddulas performed an exorcism at the cave to drive him away. Llanddulas Limestone and Gwrych Castle Wood is a Site of Special Scientific Interest.

In February 1990 a storm and high tide caused extensive flooding to the east of here, especially at Towyn and Kinmel Bay. New coastal defence works were built along seven miles of coast from Old Colwyn to the River Clwyd. At Llanddulas these consist of Dolos concrete.

At Northern Towers, a gateway to Gwrych Castle, a battle is commemorated with four plaques.

Plas Dulas, now demolished, has literary associations with Evelyn Waugh and Noël Coward. Waugh wrote the satirical novel Decline and Fall while staying there and his experiences during his visit inspired Llanabba Castle, a fictional school, in the novel. During 1925, Waugh taught at Arnold House, a former private school in Llanddulas.

== Notable residents ==
- Richard MacGillivray Dawkins at Plas Dulas
- Billy Morris (footballer, born 1918)
- Lewis Valentine
- Evelyn Waugh
