= List of rail accidents (before 1880) =

== 17th century ==
=== 1650 ===
- England – Whickham, County Durham. Two boys died when they were run over by a wagon on a wooden coal wagonway. While such tramway accidents are not generally listed as rail accidents (note the lack of accidents listed for the next 163 years) this is sometimes cited as the earliest-known railway accident.

== 1810s ==
=== 1813 ===
- February – United Kingdom – A 13-year-old boy named Jeff Bruce was killed whilst running alongside the Middleton Railway tracks. The Leeds Mercury reported that this would "operate as a warning to others".

=== 1815 ===
- 15 July – United Kingdom – 1815 Philadelphia train accident – Thirteen or sixteen people, mainly spectators, were killed and 40 injured by the boiler explosion of the experimental locomotive Brunton's Mechanical Traveller on the Newbottle Waggonway at Philadelphia, County Durham.

=== 1818 ===
- 28 February – United Kingdom – The engine-driver was killed on the Middleton Railway in Hunslet, Leeds, West Yorkshire when Salamanca's boiler exploded. As a result of the force of the explosion, he was "carried, with great violence, into an adjoining field the distance of one hundred yards." "This was the result of the driver tampering with the safety valves."

== 1820s ==
=== 1821 ===
- 5 December – United Kingdom – David Brook, a carpenter, was walking home from Leeds, Yorkshire along the Middleton Railway in a sleet storm when he was run over and killed by the engine of a coal train.

=== 1827 ===
- United Kingdom – An unnamed woman from Eaglescliffe, County Durham, England (believed to have been a blind beggar woman) was "killed by the steam machine on the railway". This is said to be the first case of a woman being killed in a railway collision.

=== 1828 ===
- 19 March – United Kingdom – The boiler of Stockton and Darlington Railway locomotive No. 5 exploded at Simpasture Junction, County Durham. One person was killed.
- July 1 – United Kingdom – The boiler of Stockton and Darlington railway locomotive Locomotion No. 1 exploded at Aycliffe Lane station, County Durham. One person was killed.

=== 1829 ===
- 4 September – United Kingdom – "A poor fellow incautiously placed himself in the way of a locomotive engine, which was driving waggons on the Liverpool and Manchester Railway in Salford, when the wheel went over one of his legs, which was literally cut off. He was carried to a surgeon's in the neighbourhood, but no effectual aid could be given to him, nor the bleeding staunched, and he died."

== 1830s ==
=== 1830 ===
- 15 September – United Kingdom – William Huskisson becomes the first widely reported passenger train death. During the ceremonial opening of the Liverpool and Manchester Railway, while standing on the track at Parkside, he was struck and fatally injured by the locomotive Rocket. (Locomotives did not yet have whistles.)

=== 1831 ===
- 8 February – United Kingdom – William Tewburn was a guard on an overnight goods train of the Liverpool and Manchester Railway, pulled by the Twin Sisters locomotive which arrived at Liverpool Road, in Manchester at 2 am, where the unfortunate victim got aboard the tender unbeknownst to the engineer, who started moving the locomotive to take on coke and water. One of these short lurching trips caused the benumbed guard to lose his grip, and he fell under first the tender and then the locomotive, virtually cutting him in half.
- 17 June – United States – After its pressure safety valve had been tied down by the train's fireman, the locomotive Best Friend of Charleston suffered a boiler explosion at Charleston, South Carolina, killing him, scalding the engineer, and injuring three others. The locomotive was the first engine of the South Carolina Canal and Railroad Company.
- 21 October – United Kingdom – On the Warrington & Newton Railway. Mr. Kitchingman had a garden that backed onto the railway at Dallam-brook. He was on the train with a friend and decided to jump off as it passed his house, but was dragged under the wheels of the following coach which mangled his leg, requiring its amputation. He later succumbed to his injuries and expired.

=== 1832 ===
- July 25 – United States – A cable-car ascending the Granite Railway incline broke loose after the chain snapped. The runaway car crashed at the bottom of the hill. Of the four on board, one was killed and two injured.
- November 25 – United Kingdom – At Rainhill station on the Liverpool and Manchester Railway, a train moving fast in foggy conditions rear-ended an earlier one that had stopped for passengers. One person was killed and three injured.

=== 1833 ===
- 1 February – United Kingdom – At Parr Moss, west of Newton-le-Willows on the Liverpool & Manchester Railway, an eastbound train was halted by the bursting of a fire tube in the locomotive. Passengers got off to see what had happened, some of them standing on the westbound track where the engine's escaping steam prevented them from seeing (or being seen from) a westbound train approaching from Bolton. Consequently, four of them were run over by the train, three being killed instantly and the fourth reported as unlikely to survive.
- 8 November – United States – Hightstown rail accident – The carriages of a Camden & Amboy passenger train derailed in the New Jersey countryside between Spotswood and Hightstown when an axle of a car broke due to an overheated journal. One car overturned, killing two people and injuring fifteen. Among the injured was Cornelius Vanderbilt, later to head the New York Central Railroad. Uninjured in the coach ahead was former U.S. President John Quincy Adams, who continued on to the nation's capital the next day.

=== 1834 ===
- 12 February – United Kingdom – A boiler explosion on a Middleton Colliery locomotive at Hunslet, Yorkshire killed one person.

=== 1836 ===
- 2 October – United States – A broken axle of a Cincinnati-bound train threw a woman and a child onto the track where they were both dragged and run over. The woman perished, but the child managed to survive, though seriously injured.
- 11 October – France – An employee of the line from Saint-Étienne to Lyon fell on a track and was decapitated by a train. The first train accident in France.

=== 1837 ===
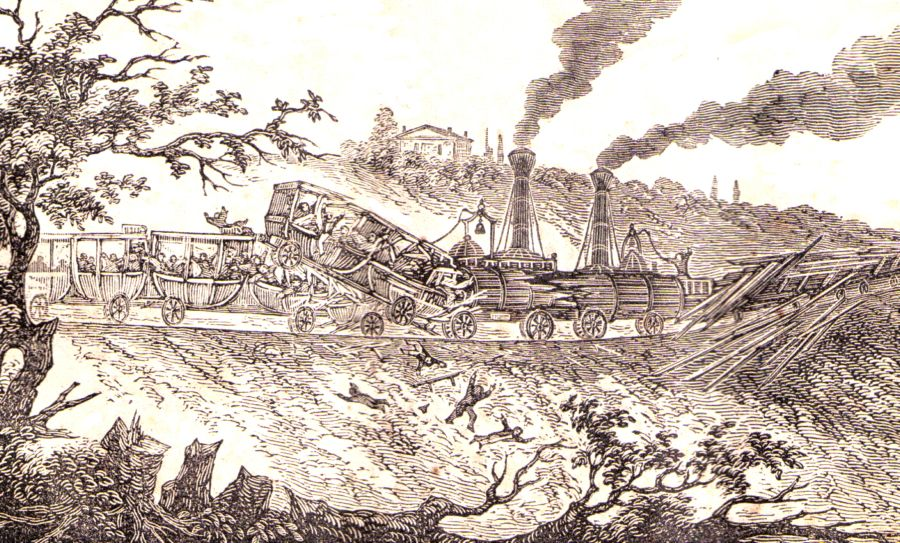
- Suffolk, Virginia collision
  11 August – United States – 1837 Suffolk head-on collision - The first head-on collision to result in passenger fatalities occurred on the Portsmouth and Roanoke Railroad near Suffolk, Virginia, when an eastbound lumber train coming down a grade at speed rounded a sharp curve and smashed into the morning passenger train from Portsmouth, Virginia. The first three of the thirteen stagecoach-style cars were smashed, killing three daughters of the prominent Ely family and injuring dozens of the 200 onboard returning from a steamboat cruise. An engraving depicting the moment of impact was published in Howland's Steamboat Disasters and Railroad Accidents in 1840.

=== 1838 ===
- 7 August – United Kingdom – A ticket inspector, Thomas Port, fell from a moving London and Birmingham Railway passenger train at Harrow, Middlesex. Both his legs had to be amputated following the accident.
- October – United Kingdom – A collision involving an experimental engine which Dionysius Lardner had been permitted to operate on the Great Western Railway killed a "pupil" of Lardner.

=== 1839 ===
- 2 February – United Kingdom – Charlotte Carrad was killed by a train heading for Slough on the Great Western Railway, eight months after this section, the first of the GWR, had opened. She was trying to cross the track at Langley to pick turnip tops in a field. She had seen the train, Hurricane, with three carriages, coming at about 18 miles per hour (29 km/h) but hurried down the public footpath to get across the track. She reached the further rail when the engine struck her on the shoulder. Her friend, who was with her, found her in the ditch on the other side of the track. There was a little sign of life, but she died a minute or two later, her neck vertebrae having been dislocated.

== 1840s ==
=== 1840 ===
- 4 May – United States – One passenger was killed and several others injured when a lattice bridge over rain-swollen Catskill Creek collapsed under the weight of a Canajoharie and Catskill Railroad train en route from Catskill, New York, to Cairo, New York.
- 7 August – United Kingdom – Howden rail crash, Five passengers were killed when a casting fell from a wagon and derailed the carriages of a Hull and Selby Railway passenger train.
- September – United Kingdom – A North Midland Railway passenger train was derailed between South Wingfield and Ambergate, Derbyshire. Two passengers were killed.
- September – United Kingdom – An Eastern Counties Railway passenger train collided with the rear end of another at Old Ford, Essex. One person was killed.
- 10 November – United Kingdom – Two employees of the Birmingham and Gloucester Railway lost their life when the boiler of the 2-2-0 steam locomotive Surprise exploded at Bromsgrove, Worcestershire.
- 11 November – United Kingdom – A York and North Midland Railway luggage train collided with the rear end of a passenger train at Taylor's Junction, Yorkshire. Two passengers were killed.

=== 1841 ===
- 5 October – United States – Two Western Railroad passenger trains collided head-on between Worcester, Massachusetts and Albany, New York. A conductor and a passenger were killed and seventeen passengers injured.
- 24 December – United Kingdom – Sonning Cutting railway accident – a Great Western Railway Paddington to Bristol train including goods-wagons and open passenger-wagons ran into a landslide in a cutting. Nine passengers were killed and sixteen injured, leading to calls for better protection for passengers.

=== 1842 ===
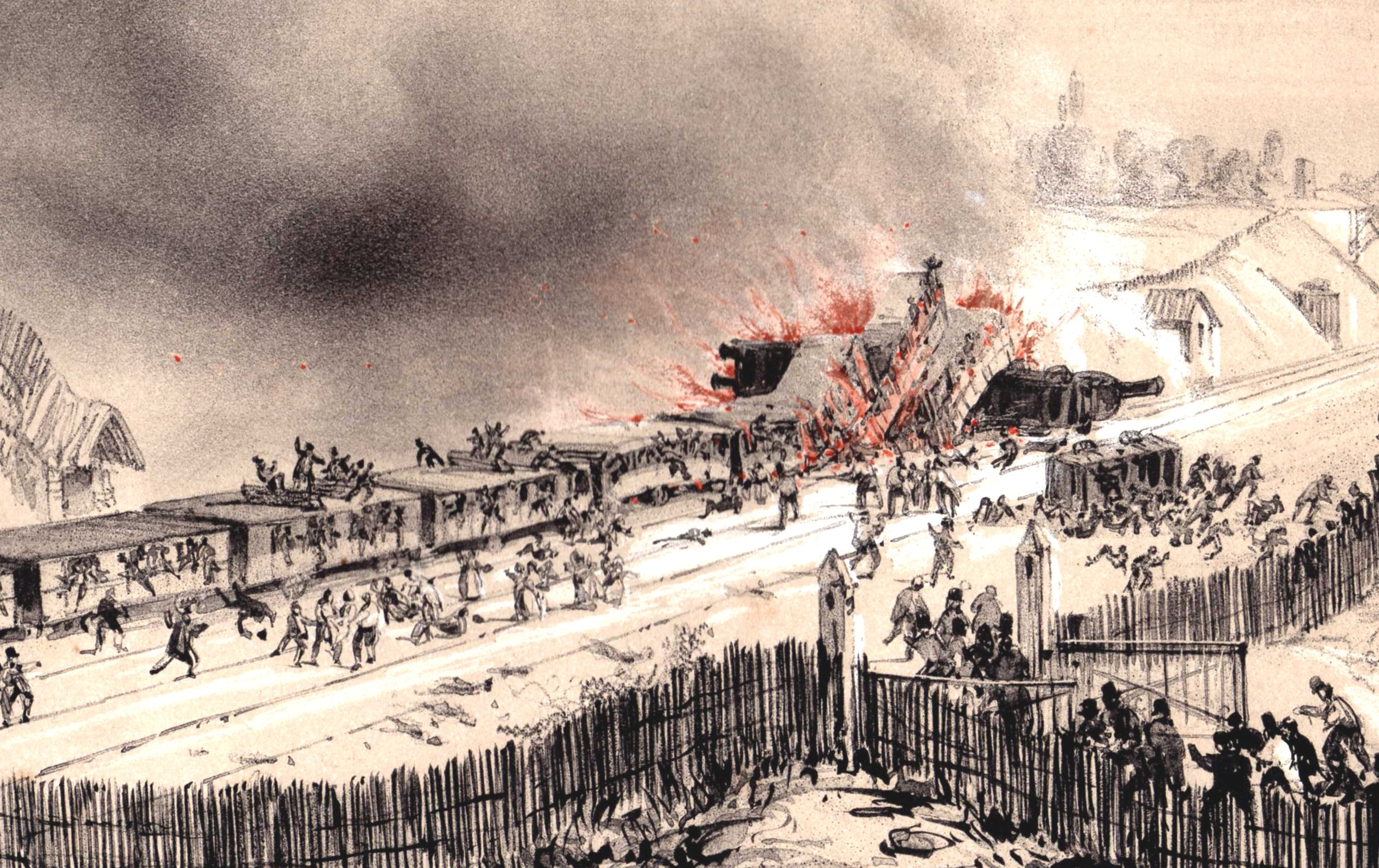
- Versailles train disaster
  8 May – France – Versailles rail accident – Following the King's fete celebrations at the Palace of Versailles, a train returning to Gare Montparnasse, Paris derailed at Meudon, Hauts-de-Seine due to a broken axle on the leading locomotive. The wreckage caught fire, killing between 52 and 200 people, including the explorer Jules Dumont d'Urville.

=== 1843 ===
- 6 January – United Kingdom – A collision between two North Midland Railway trains at Barnsley, Yorkshire killed one person. The only passenger to be killed travelling by train in the United Kingdom that year.
- 10 March – Netherlands – During a test drive a locomotive derailed on an incompletely closed railway bridge near Warmond. One person was killed. This was the first railway accident in the Netherlands.
- United Kingdom – A locomotive boiler explosion on the Hartlepool Railway killed one person - a member of the public travelling illegally on the footplate.

=== 1844 ===
- 1 May – United Kingdom – The boiler of Newcastle and Carlisle Railway locomotive Adelaide exploded at Carlisle, Cumberland. Two people were injured.
- December 11 – United Kingdom – The boiler of South Eastern Railway locomotive No. 78 Forrester exploded while hauling a freight train near Bricklayers' Arms, Surrey. Its two crewmen were killed.

=== 1845 ===
- 28 January – United Kingdom – The boiler of Newcastle and Carlisle Railway locomotive Venus exploded whilst it was hauling a freight train.
- 28 January – United Kingdom – The boiler of Manchester and Leeds Railway locomotive No. 27 Irk exploded at Miles Platting, Lancashire.
- 28 July – United Kingdom – A passenger train is run into by a steam locomotive at Penshurst, Kent, injuring about 30 people.

=== 1846 ===
- 20 January – United Kingdom – A bridge over the River Medway between Tonbridge and Penshurst, Kent, England, collapsed while a South Eastern Railway freight train was passing over it. Its driver was killed.
- 9 July – United Kingdom – A Clarence Railway engine standing in a branch line of the Stockton and Darlington Railway suddenly began to move down the incline and collided with some waggons of another Clarence engine. Four men were crushed between the carriages and were severely injured; one died at the scene.
- 20 November – United Kingdom – During the construction of the Blackburn, Darwen and Bolton Railway, the boiler of ex-Stockton and Darlington Railway locomotive No. 18 Shildon exploded at Sough, Lancashire.
- 23 November – United Kingdom – Elizabeth Coleman, aged eleven years, was killed on the Eastern Counties Railway. The deceased was, it appeared, endeavouring to cross the line at a point near the Roydon station where the Lockroad crosses the line on a level when she was struck by the buffer of a Cambridge train and killed on the spot. The jury returned a verdict of "accidental death."

=== 1847 ===
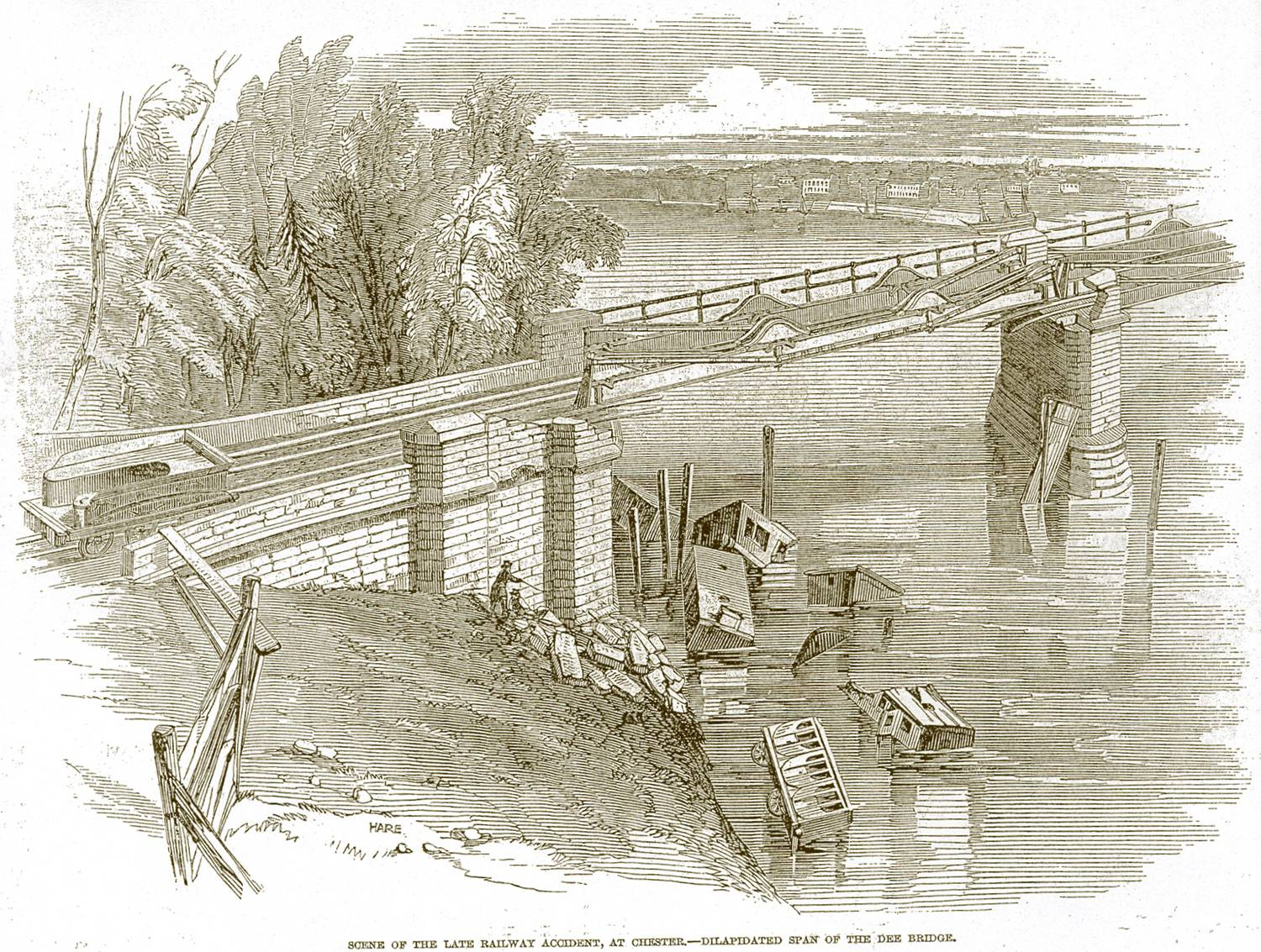
- The Dee bridge after its collapse
  24 May – United Kingdom – Dee bridge disaster – Five persons were killed and nine injured when the carriages of a Chester-to-Ruabon train fell 50 feet (15 m) into the River Dee following the collapse of a bridge. One of the supporting cast-iron girders had cracked in the centre and given way. The locomotive and tender managed to reach the other side of the bridge, which had been engineered by Robert Stephenson. The accident caused his reputation to be questioned. The collapse led to a re-evaluation of the use of cast iron in railway bridges, in the light of which many bridges had to be demolished or reinforced.
- 28 June – United Kingdom – A North Union Railway locomotive suffered a boiler explosion, injuring one person.

=== 1848 ===
- 25 April – United Kingdom – The boiler of a North Midland Railway locomotive exploded at Normanton, Derbyshire, scalding three people.
- 10 May – United Kingdom – 1848 Shrivenham rail collision – Six passengers were killed and thirteen injured at Shrivenham, Berkshire when a Great Western Railway express train ran into two wagons on the line. The horse-box and cattle van had been pushed onto the main line by two porters to free a wagon turntable. Although the locomotive was undamaged, the side of the leading carriage was torn out.

=== 1849 ===
- Whitsuntide – United Kingdom – An East Lancashire Railway passenger train collided with the rear end of an excursion train. Despite efforts to protect the passenger train's rear, another excursion train subsequently ran into it.
- 27 June – United Kingdom – The boiler of Great Western Railway locomotive Goliah exploded while it was hauling a freight train on the South Devon Railway at Plympton, Devon. One person was killed.

== 1850s ==
=== 1850 ===
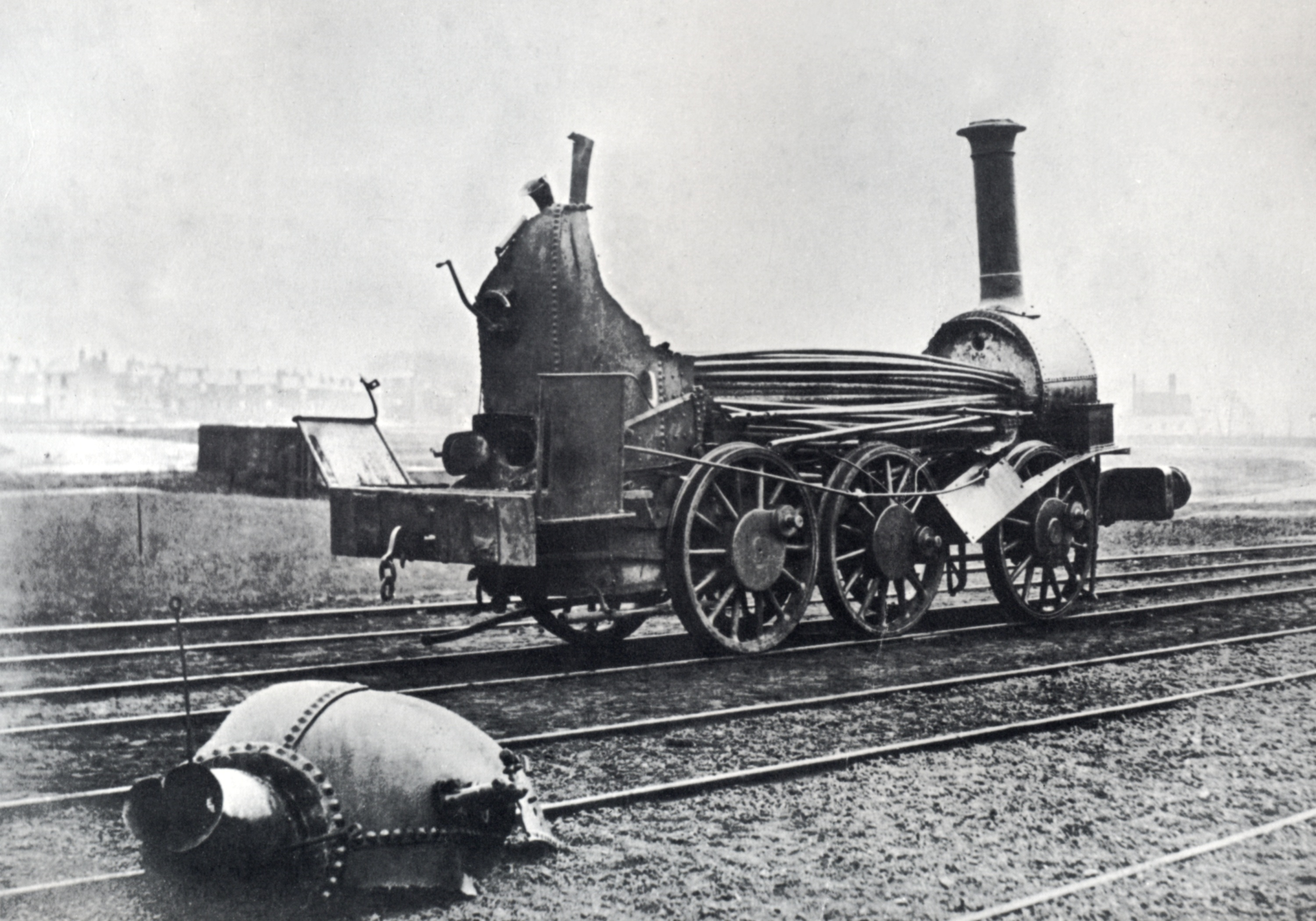
- Boiler explosion, 2 February 1850
  2 February – United Kingdom – The firebox of a York, Newcastle and Berwick Railway locomotive collapsed while the locomotive was hauling a freight train near Darlington, County Durham. Two persons were killed.
- 26 March – United Kingdom – The boiler of a London and North Western Railway locomotive exploded at Wolverton, Buckinghamshire due to tampering of the safety valves. One person was injured.
- June – United Kingdom – The boiler of a Midland Railway locomotive exploded at Kegworth, Derbyshire.
- 1 August – United Kingdom – Cowlairs train collision – When three Scottish Central Railway excursion trains were scheduled to arrive in rapid succession at Cowlairs, Lanarkshire, the second one stopped on a crossover and needed to reverse in order to clear it; but although time interval working was in use, no-one went back to protect the now late-running train and the third train crashed into it, killing five people.
- United Kingdom – A Great Western Railway excursion train collided with a horsebox that had escaped from a siding at Wootton Bassett Junction, Wiltshire. Following this accident, The Great Western Railway provides trap points and scotch blocks at all sidings exiting on to main lines.
- United Kingdom – A Midland Railway train ran into the rear end of an excursion train at Woodlesford station, Yorkshire because a signal was lit at night.
- United Kingdom – The boiler of a York and North Midland Railway locomotive explodes at Staddlethorpe, Yorkshire, derailing the locomotive. Two people are injured.

=== 1851 ===
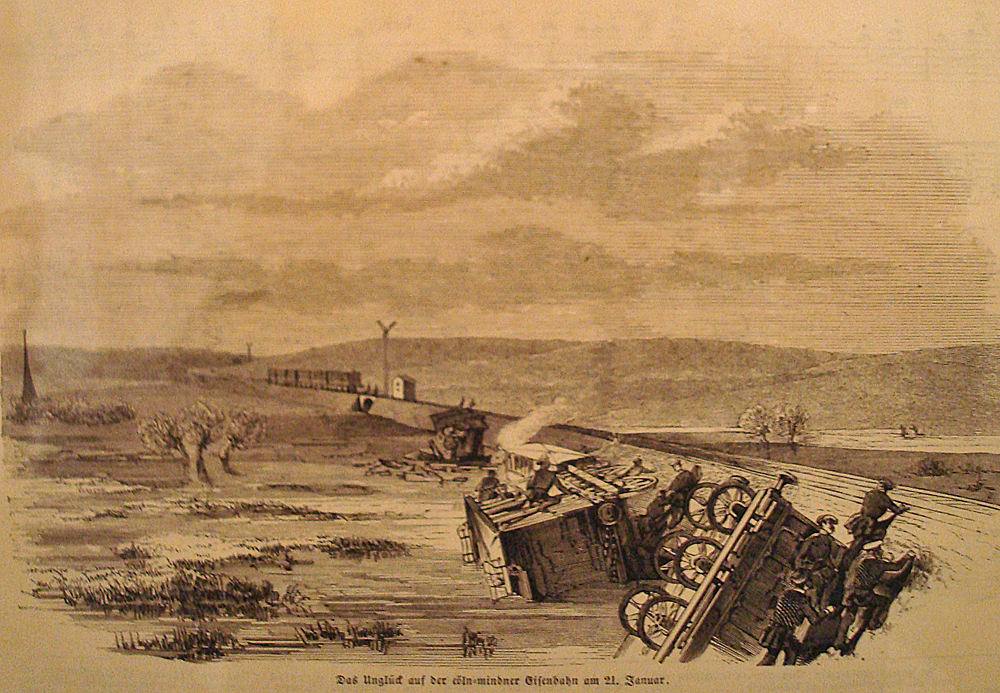
- 1851 Avenwedde rail accident, 21 January 1851
  21 January – Germany – The 1851 Avenwedde rail accident was the first German rail accident with several fatalities and the worst rail accident worldwide at that time. Three people died.
- 30 April – United Kingdom – Sutton Tunnel railway accident - A Birkenhead, Lancashire and Cheshire Junction Railway passenger train ran into the rear end of another inside Sutton Tunnel, Cheshire. The train that was run into was pushing another in front of it; both had stalled. Six people were killed and "a great number" are injured.
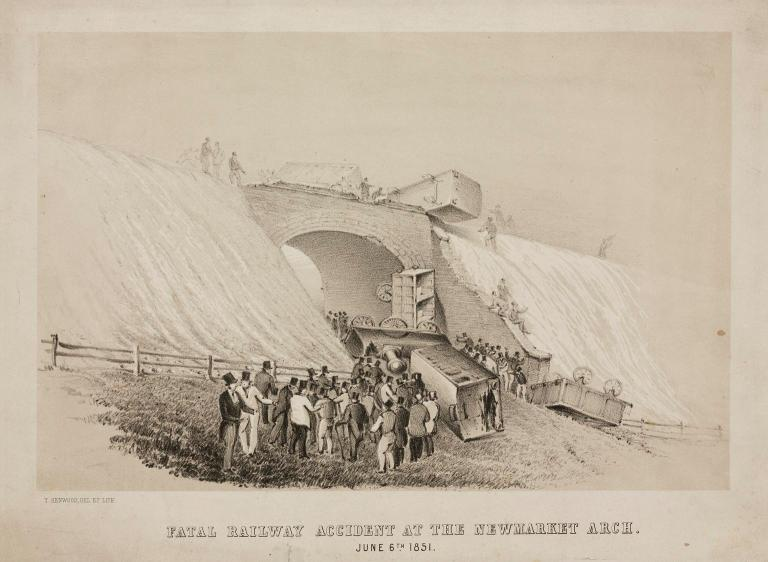
- Brighton railway disaster
  6 June – United Kingdom – Brighton railway disaster – A London, Brighton and South Coast Railway train was derailed on a bridge between Brighton and Lewes by a sleeper placed across a rail, killing five people.

=== 1852 ===
- 12 July – United Kingdom – Burnley railway accident – A 35-coach school excursion train from Goole arrived at Burnley station on the Lancashire and Yorkshire Railway, where its length far exceeded that of the platform's track. The engines were detached and the train left coasting slowly downhill into a long siding. As the station was understaffed, two friends of the staff had been asked to help out. One of them briefly let go of a set of weighted points, misrouting the train into the dead-end platform track, where it crashed into the buffers before it could be braked. Of 800 persons on board, four were killed.
- 29 July – United Kingdom – On the London and North Western Railway, a locomotive was brought into Shrewsbury shed for a minor repair, but the steam was still engaged when the fire was dropped. After the engine was repaired and fired up, it was left unattended for 20 minutes at a shift change. It ran away onto the main line and 14 miles (23 km) later collided with a standing train at Donnington, Shropshire, killing one passenger.
- 3 August – United Kingdom – The ashpan of the locomotive fell off a Rugby-to-Birmingham train at Hampton on the London and North Western Railway, derailing a van and one coach, which consequently collided with a train on the other track. Two passengers were killed and several injured.
- September 25 – United Kingdom – the boiler of an Eastern Counties Railway locomotive exploded.
- 4 October – United Kingdom – A South Eastern Railway passenger train was derailed between Ticehurst Road and Etchingham, East Sussex, England, when the formation became flooded and washed away. Both engine crewmen were injured.
- 25 November – United Kingdom – A Great Western Railway train hauled by locomotive Lynx was derailed at Gatcombe, Gloucestershire.

=== 1853 ===
- 6 January – United States – Franklin Pierce rail accident – A train carrying President-elect Franklin Pierce, his wife Jane and their son Benjamin derailed and toppled off an embankment near Andover, MA. Franklin and Jane suffered minor injuries, but their son Benjamin was killed.
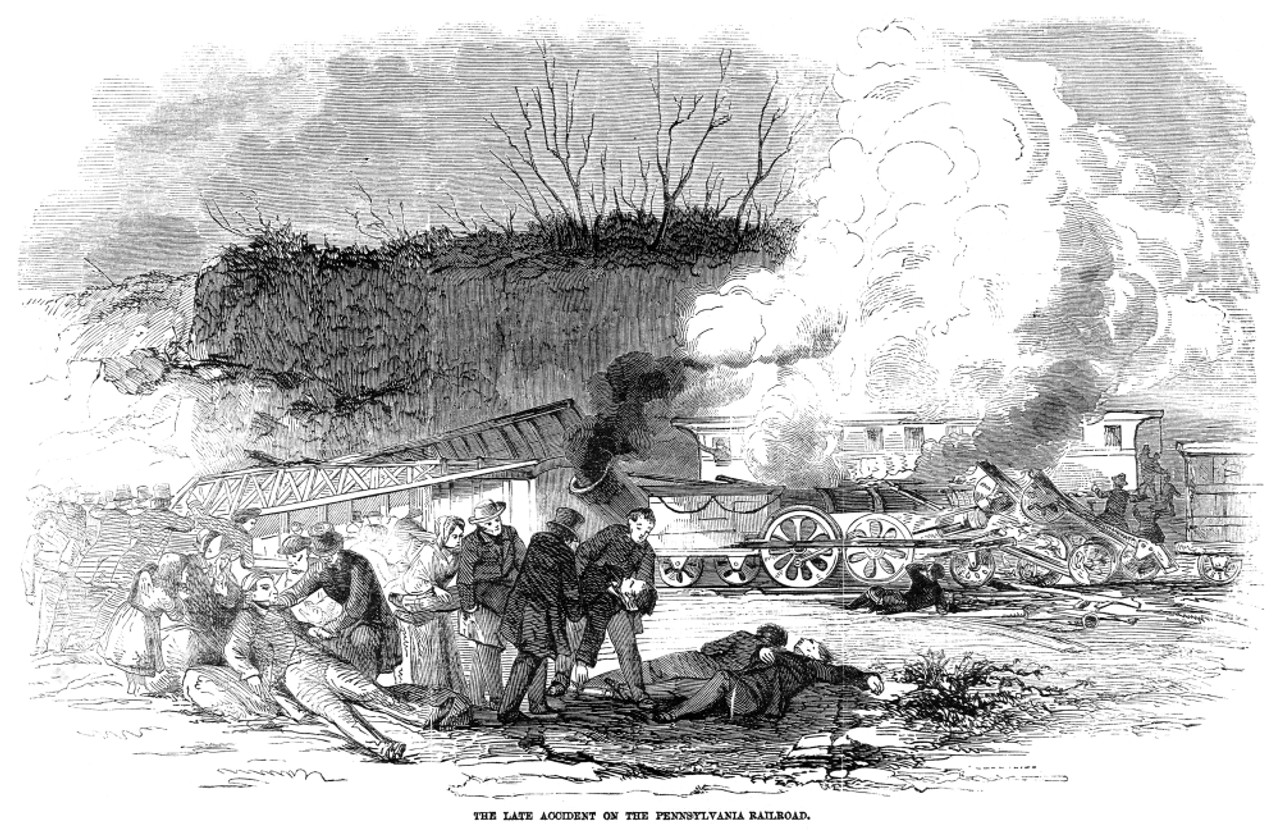
- 1853 Mount Union rail disaster
  4 March – United States – 1853 Mount Union rail disaster – A train carrying emigrants near Mount Union, Pennsylvania, was rear-ended by a mail train; its boilers ruptured as the result, scalding seven people to death and incurring the US's highest railway-related death toll at the time. The engineer of the mail train was reportedly asleep when the collision occurred.
- 4 March – United Kingdom – A Lancashire and Yorkshire Railway train derailed on a deteriorated section of track near Dixon Fold, killing the driver and five passengers.
- 6 March – United Kingdom – The boiler of a London and North Western Railway locomotive exploded at Longsight, Lancashire. Six people were killed and the engine shed was severely damaged.
- 17 March – United Kingdom – The boiler of a London, Brighton and South Coast Railway locomotive exploded at Brighton, East Sussex.
- 27 March – United States – Wheeling rail disaster – A loose rail resulted in two Baltimore and Ohio Railroad passenger cars tumbling down a cliff in West Virginia. Eight to seventeen persons died and 39 were wounded.
- 23 April – United States – A train ran through an open drawbridge over Rancocas Creek. No fatalities were reported.
- 25 April – United States – Greater Grand Crossing rail collision- A collision near Chicago resulted in the death of 18 persons.
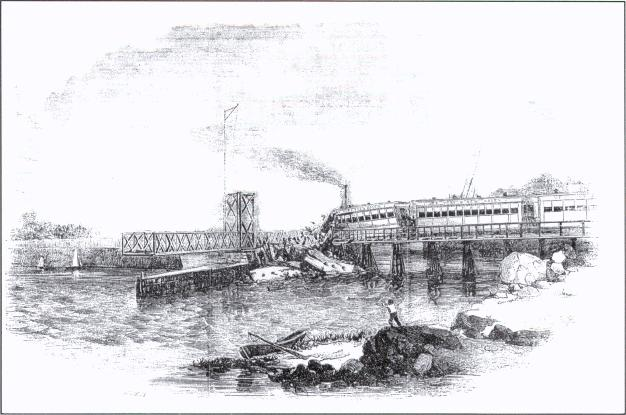
- Norwalk River, Connecticut
  6 May – United States – Norwalk rail accident – The first major American railroad bridge disaster occurred when a New Haven Railroad engineer neglected to check for an open swing bridge signal. The locomotive, four cars, and part of a fifth car ran through the open bridge and plunged into the Norwalk River, Connecticut. Forty-six passengers were crushed to death or drowned and about 30 others were severely injured.
- 9 May – United States – A cornfield meet in the New Jersey Meadowlands resulted in the death of two people. One of the engineers had not been forewarned about the change in time schedule that accounted for the accident's occurrence.
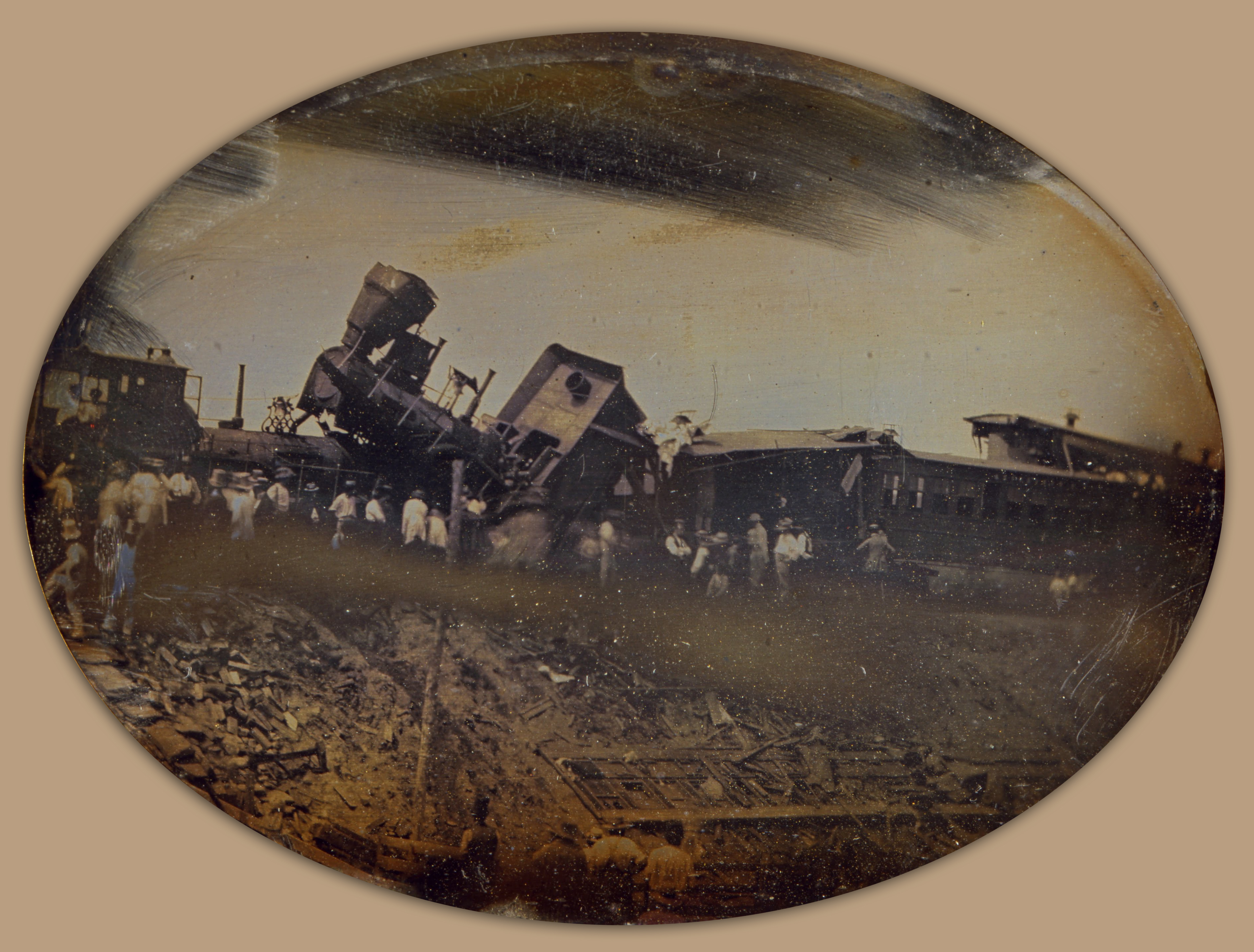
- 1853 Providence and Worcester head-on collision
  12 August – Valley Falls train collision – United States – Two Providence and Worcester Railroad passenger trains met in a head-on collision at Valley Falls, Rhode Island. Thirteen persons were killed and 50 injured. This is believed to be the earliest wreck photographed, the daguerreotype, taken by a Mr. L. Wright of Pawtucket, forming the basis for an engraving a fortnight later in The Illustrated News of New York.
- September – United Kingdom – An Eastern Counties Railway freight train came to a halt near Brandon, Suffolk due to a locomotive failure. The driver of another freight train deliberately ignored a red signal and consequently his train collided with the rear end of the first train.
- 5 October – Ireland – 1853 Straffan rail accident – A Great Southern and Western Railway express passenger train was brought to a halt south of Straffan, County Kildare due to a broken piston rod on the locomotive. It was run into by a following freight train due to the failure of the guard to act to protect the line to the rear of the halted train. Eighteen persons were killed.
- United Kingdom – The boiler of a Midland Railway locomotive exploded near Bristol, Gloucestershire while hauling a freight train.

=== 1854 ===
- 4 July - United States - Ruxton-Riderwood train collision - Two locomotives collided on the Baltimore and Susquehanna Railroad near the Riderwood and Ruxton communities in Towson, Maryland, resulting in 30 deaths and the reorganization of the railroad into the Northern Central Railroad.
- 24 August – United Kingdom – A South Eastern Railway excursion train ran into the rear of a light engine at Windmill Bridge, Croydon, Surrey. Three passengers were killed.
- 27 October – Canada – Jeannette's Creek train wreck – A Great Western Railway passenger train ran into the rear end of a gravel train at Baptiste Creek, Ontario. Fifty-two persons were killed and at least 48 injured.

=== 1855 ===
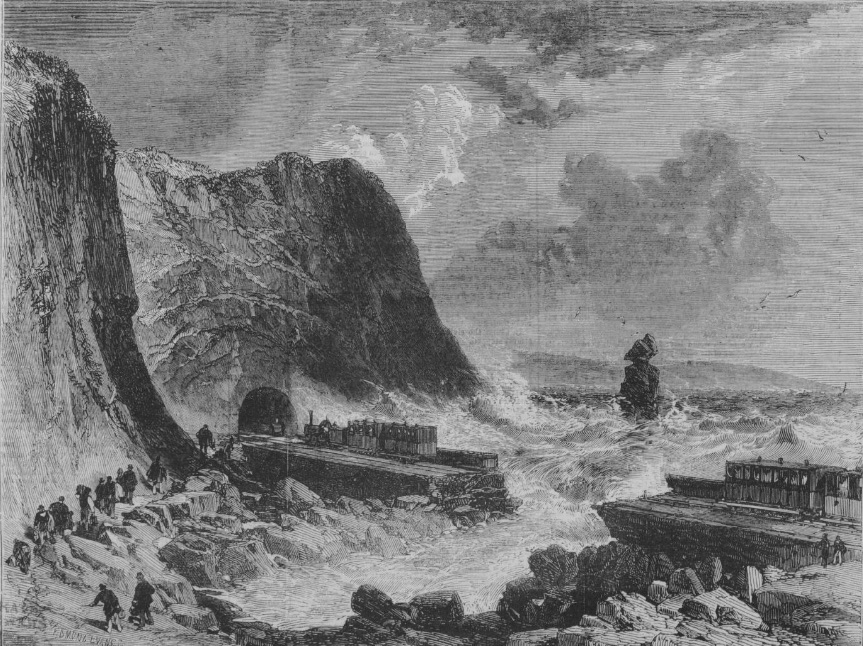
- South Devon Railway sea wall, 3 March 1855
  February–March – United Kingdom – On Monday 12 February 1855 large portions of the South Devon Railway sea wall were washed away. Despite repair work starting promptly, four days later more of the sea wall and a 70-yard (64 m)-long section of railway tracks were also washed away. Passengers were obliged to leave their trains and carry their luggage some distance in order to reach connecting rail-services. A temporary viaduct was constructed by the resident engineer, Mr. Margery, and was in operation within a couple of weeks, permitting the through passage of coaches, pulled by hand and rope, although some nervous passengers still alighted and walked.
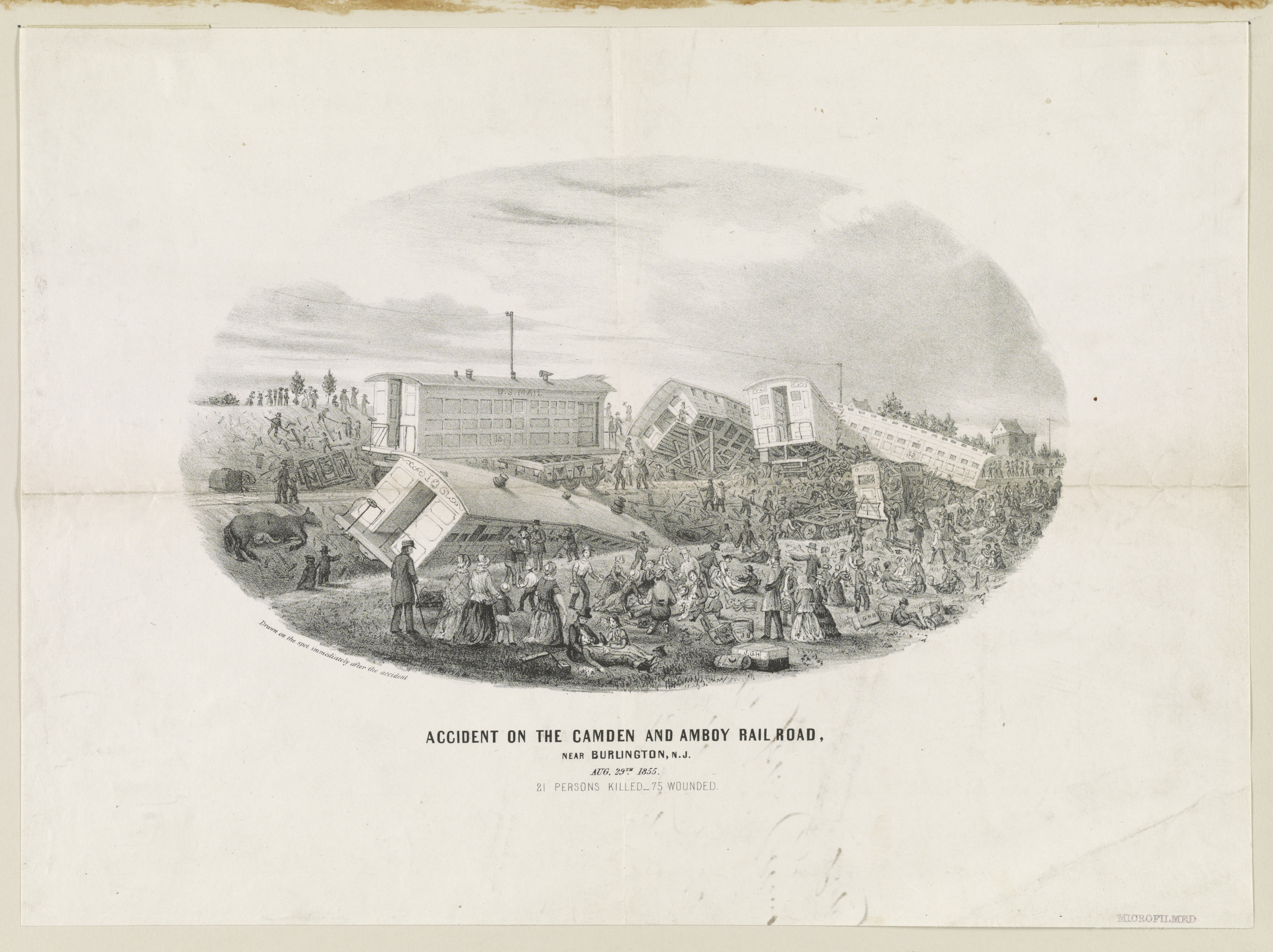
- 1855 Camden & Amboy rail accident
  29 August – United States – 1855 Camden & Amboy rail accident – A southbound Camden and Amboy Rail Road passenger train, backing up on a single track near Burlington, New Jersey, to make room for a northbound express, hit a horse-drawn carriage. The rearmost passenger car derailed, and the succeeding cars crashed into it, derailed, and plunged into a ditch. All four passenger cars were demolished. Twenty-four persons died and between 65 and 100 were injured.
- 1 November – United States – Gasconade Bridge train disaster – A bridge over the Gasconade River at Gasconade, Missouri collapsed underneath a Pacific Railroad excursion train during the line's opening celebrations. Thirty-one persons were killed, and hundreds seriously injured.
- 12 September – United Kingdom – A light engine was dispatched from Reading on the wrong line and collided head-on with a South Eastern Railway passenger train. Four persons died and many were injured.
- 15 December – United States – The boiler of the New York Central Railroad locomotive Dewitt Clinton exploded, killing the engineer and fireman.
- United Kingdom – A South Eastern Railway train was derailed at Bricklayers' Arms Junction, Surrey, when a pointsman moved a set of points underneath it.

=== 1856 ===
- 6 May – Panama – 1856 Panama Railroad accident- A train with over 500 passengers derailed near Aspinwall in Panama. Thirty to forty persons were killed and 70 to 80 injured.
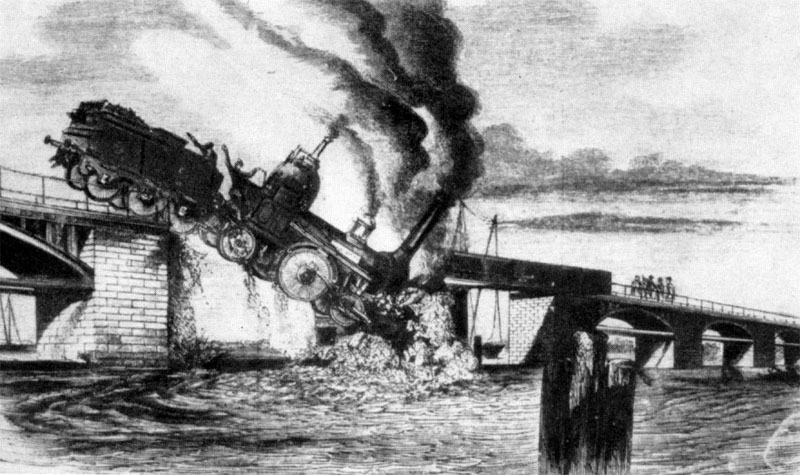
- Crash of the Jupiter, 29 May 1856
  29 May – Germany – The Jupiter locomotive crashed into the Potsdamer Havel during a test run due to a swing bridge that was not closed.
- 21 June – United Kingdom – A South Eastern Railway passenger train derailed between Tunbridge Wells and Tunbridge Junction, Kent, killing the driver and injuring the fireman and a passenger.
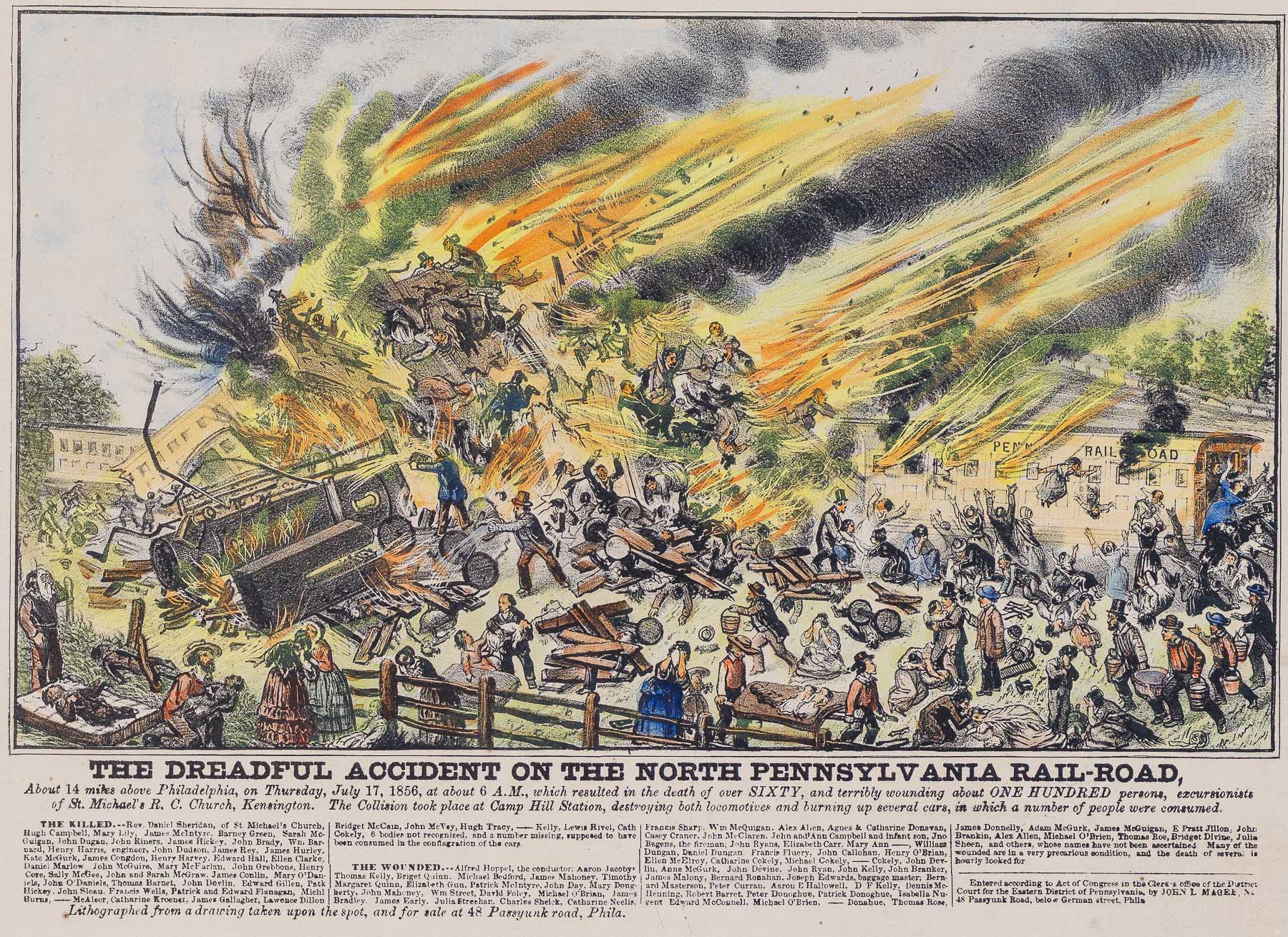
- Camp Hill, Pennsylvania
  17 July – United States – Great Train Wreck of 1856 – Two North Pennsylvania Railroad passenger trains collided head-on at Camp Hill, Pennsylvania, one of them a train carrying a Sunday school at St. Michael's Catholic Parish in Philadelphia. Fifty-nine persons were killed in the crash and subsequent fire, with over 100 injured, some of whom consequently died. One of the two trains' conductors committed suicide the same day; the other was indicted for manslaughter but acquitted.
- 10 August – Netherlands – Schiedam train accident – Two passenger trains collided resulting in three deaths.
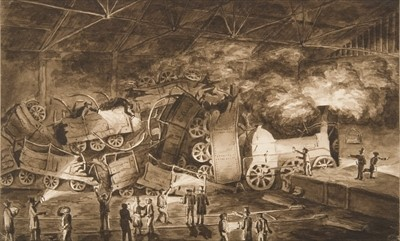
- Salisbury, 6 October 1856
  6 October – United Kingdom – Accident at Salisbury resulted in 2 fatalities and 1 injury.

=== 1857 ===
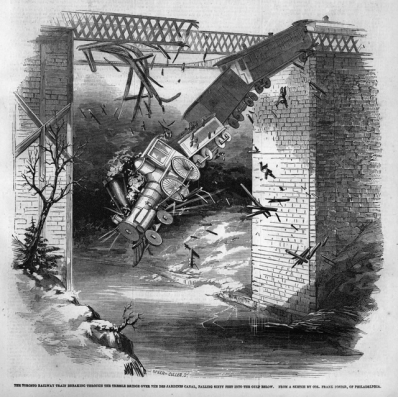
- Desjardins Canal disaster
  12 March – Canada – Desjardins Canal disaster: A bridge over the Desjardins Canal collapsed when the axle of a Great Western Railway passenger train from Toronto to Hamilton broke as the train was passing across it. Fifty-nine people were killed as the result of blunt force trauma or drowning after being thrown into the frozen canal.
- 27 June – United Kingdom – 1857 Lewisham rail crash: A South Eastern Railway passenger train ran into the rear of another at Lewisham, Kent due to an error by the signalman at Blackheath, Kent. Eleven persons were killed and 30 injured.

=== 1858 ===
- 6 May – United Kingdom – A passenger train from Plymouth on the newly opened Cornwall Railway derailed just before the Grove Viaduct near St Germans and the engine and two cars plunged toward the water. Three railwaymen were killed.
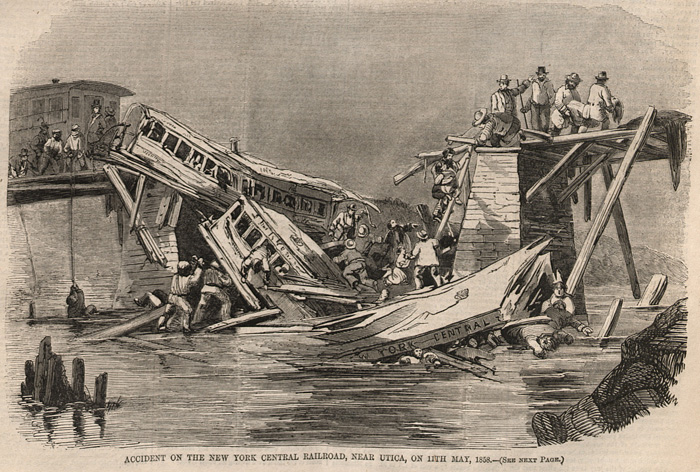
- 1858 Utica train wreck
  11 May – United States – 1858 Utica train wreck – A bridge some three miles (5 km) from Utica, New York gave way when two trains, including a New York Central, express bound for Cincinnati, passed over it. Nine passengers died, including some who drowned, and fifty were injured.
- 15 May – United States – A Lafayette & Indianapolis Railroad train accident occurred on a 120-foot (37-metre) bridge over Potato Creek, about 17 miles (27 km) south-east of Lafayette near Colfax, Indiana. The engineer, Jacob Beitinger (Beidinger), the fireman, Patrick Maloney (Moloney), and conductor James W. Irwin were killed.
- 30 June – United Kingdom – A South Eastern Railway passenger train was derailed at Chilham, Kent. Three people are killed.
- 11 August – United Kingdom – A passenger train ran into the buffers at Ramsgate Town station, Kent. Twenty persons were injured.
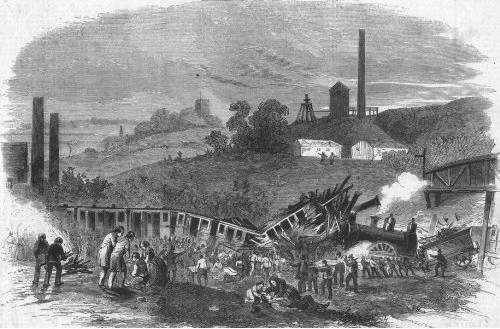
- Round Oak
  23 August – United Kingdom – Round Oak rail accident – An Oxford, Worcester and Wolverhampton Railway passenger train became divided following a coupling failure. The rear portion ran away and collided with a following passenger train at Round Oak station, Stourbridge, Worcestershire. Fourteen persons were killed; there were 50 serious and 170 minor injuries.
- 6 September – France – On the Chemin de fer de Paris à Saint-Germain, a 10-car atmospheric railway train was returning by gravity with about 300 festival-goers from Saint-Germain-en-Laye to Le Vésinet, where it was due to couple to a steam locomotive in order to continue on to Paris. Due to a combination of errors, it ran away and crashed into the locomotive's tender. A crew member and two passengers were killed, and at least 40 persons were injured.

=== 1859 ===
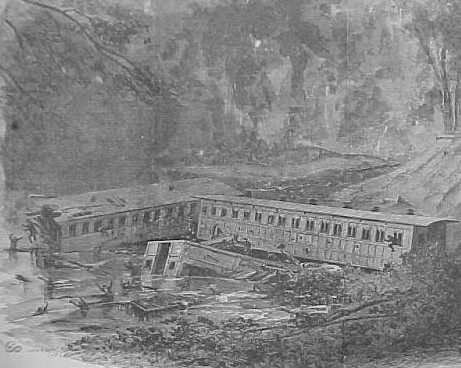
- South Bend, Indiana
  28 June – United States – South Bend train wreck – At South Bend, Indiana, the Springbrook Bridge collapsed as a Michigan Southern Railroad express passenger train passed over it. The locomotive and two carriages smashed into the mudbank 30 feet (9 m) below. Forty-two persons were killed and 50 injured.
- August – United Kingdom – An axle of the engine of the London, Tilbury and Southend Railway fractured at Stanford-le-Hope, Essex. One male passenger was killed.
- 24 December – United States – Due to a collision on the Macon and Savannah Railroad, about 170 miles from Savannah, Georgia, one person killed and several injured.

== 1860s ==
=== 1860 ===
- 20 February – United Kingdom – The tyre of an Eastern Counties Railway locomotive broke as it was hauling a passenger train through Tottenham station. The train derailed, killing seven persons.
- 16 May – United States – On the Florida, Atlantic and Gulf Central Railroad about thirteen miles (21 km) west of Jacksonville, Florida, a train encountered a drove of cattle which threw the train off track. Lumber, logs trunks and passengers were "heaped up in almost inextricable confusion." Nearly every person on board was injured to some extent, three of them fatally.
- 6 September – United Kingdom – Helmshore rail accident – A Lancashire and Yorkshire Railway excursion train became divided at Helmshore, Lancashire. Sixteen carriages ran away rearwards and crashed into the following train. Eleven persons were killed.
- 26 September – United Kingdom – Bull bridge accident – A cast iron bridge collapsed underneath a Midland Railway freight train at Bullbridge, Derbyshire.
- 16 November – United Kingdom – A London and North Western Railway mail train overran signals and crashed into the rear of a cattle train at Atherstone, Warwickshire. Ten people were killed, most of them Irish drovers asleep in the cattle trains's brake van.

=== 1861 ===
- January – United Kingdom – A London Chatham and Dover Railway passenger train was derailed at Sittingbourne, Kent. One person was killed.
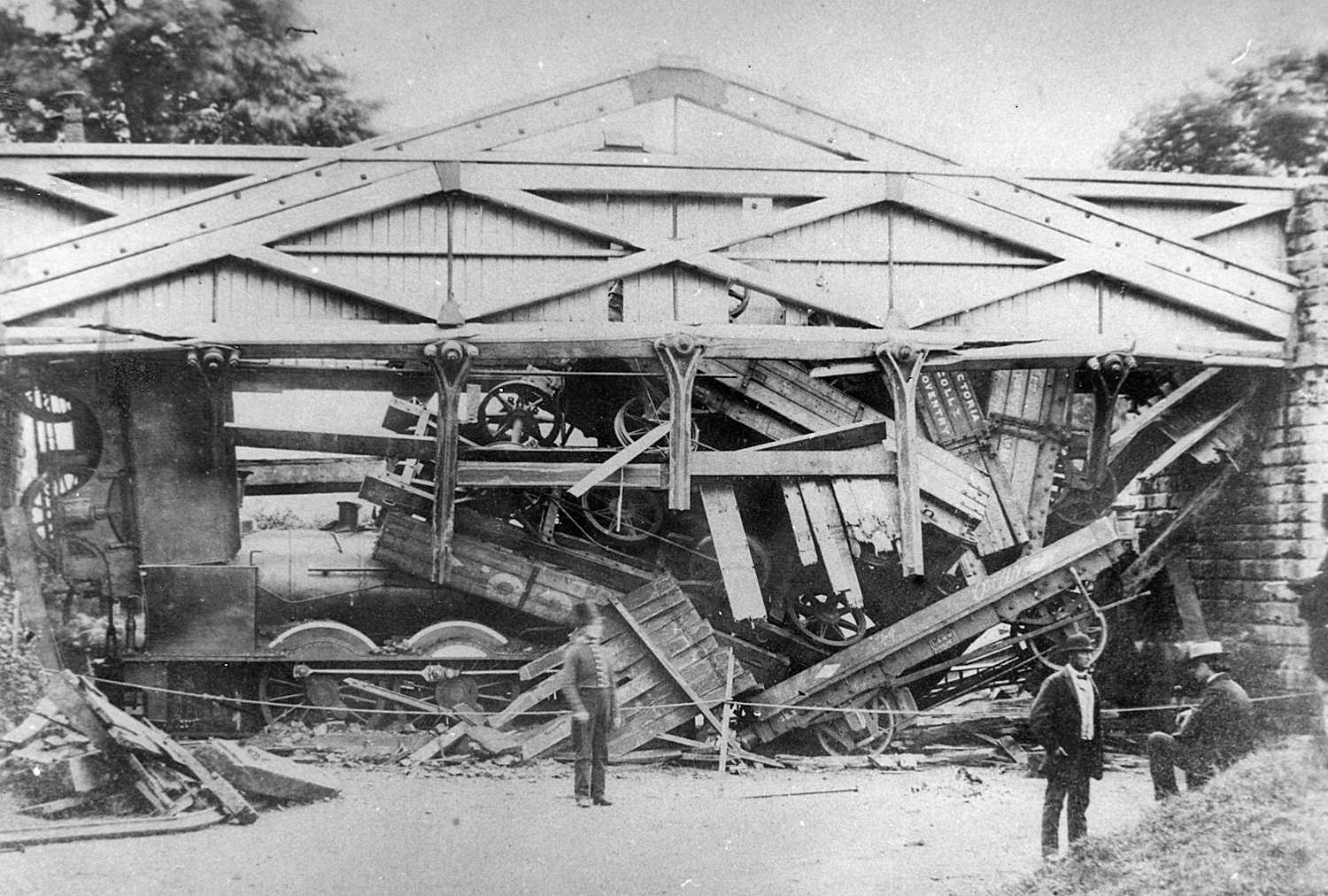
- Wootton bridge after the crash
  11 June – United Kingdom – Wootton bridge collapse: A cast iron bridge near Kenilworth, Warwickshire collapsed underneath a London and North Western Railway freight train. Both of the locomotive's crewmen were killed.
- 4 July – United Kingdom – As the westbound Irish Mail was approaching Easenhall bridge, four miles (6.4 km) past Rugby, at about 35 mph (56 km/h), its 2-2-2 LNWR Bloomer Class locomotive was completely destroyed in an explosion accountable to badly corroded boiler plates. Luckily no passengers were injured even slightly, but of the railwaymen and postal crew on board, one was killed and three were injured.
- 25 August – United Kingdom – Clayton Tunnel rail crash: A London, Brighton and South Coast Railway excursion train crashed into the rear of another inside the Clayton Tunnel, West Sussex due to a combination of driver's, signalman's and operating errors. Twenty-three people were killed and 176 injured in what was then the deadliest railway accident in the United Kingdom.
- 29 August – United Kingdom – A South Durham and Lancashire Union Railway excursion train returning from Windermere to Darlington derailed three miles (5 km) west of Bowes, injuring a number of passengers. The injured driver and fireman were trapped beneath the locomotive for several hours before being rescued. The driver died on September 8, 1861, from his injuries.
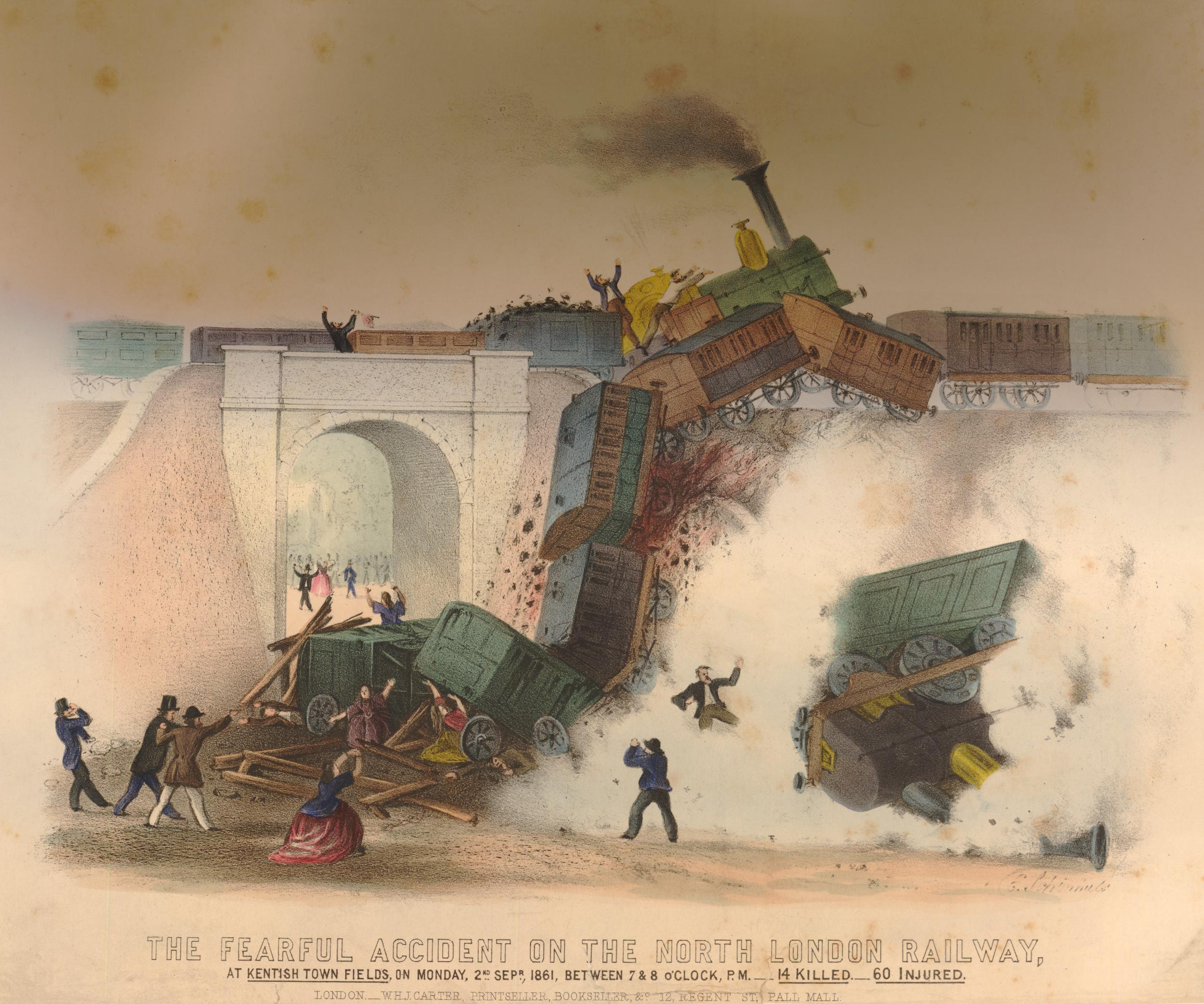
- Kentish Town rail accident
  2 September – United Kingdom – Kentish Town rail accident: A North London Railway excursion train collided with a London and North Western Railway freight train at Kentish Town, Middlesex due to a signalman's error. Sixteen persons were killed and 317 injured.
- 3 September – United States – Platte Bridge Railroad Tragedy: A Hannibal and St. Joseph Railroad train was wrecked after bushwhackers sabotaged the supports of a bridge over the Platte River in Missouri. At least 17 occupants were killed and around 100 injured.
- December – United Kingdom – A London, Chatham and Dover Railway train hauled by locomotive Eclipse was derailed at Teynham, Kent due to the elongation of the gap at a rail joint in cold weather.

=== 1862 ===
- February 27 – United States – 1862 Ponchatoula train wreck – A Confederate Army train collided with a lumber train, resulting in 28 deaths.
- May – United Kingdom – A London, Chatham and Dover Railway passenger train was derailed at Faversham, Kent owing to defective track. Three persons were killed.
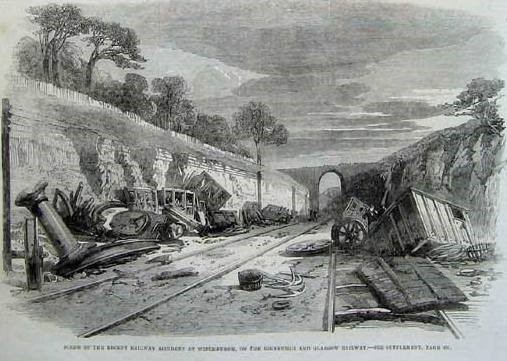
- Winchburgh rail crash
  13 October – United Kingdom – Winchburgh rail crash – Two Edinburgh and Glasgow Railway passenger trains collided head-on at Winchburgh, Linlithgowshire due to a pointsman's error. Fifteen occupants were killed and 35 injured.
- August - United States - In Manassas, Virginia, a passenger train derailed after sabotaging of the tracks during the Manassas Station Operations (Stonewall Jackson), 2 people were injured.

=== 1863 ===
- 19 February – United States – Chunky Creek train wreck: The Hercules on the Southern Rail Road crashed into the Chunky River in Newton County, Mississippi. The train was headed for Vicksburg where Confederate forces were in need of reinforcements. The Hercules derailed on a damaged bridge and fell into the cold, murky depths. At least 40 passengers were killed. Some victims were rescued by soldiers from the 1st Choctaw Battalion who were camped nearby.
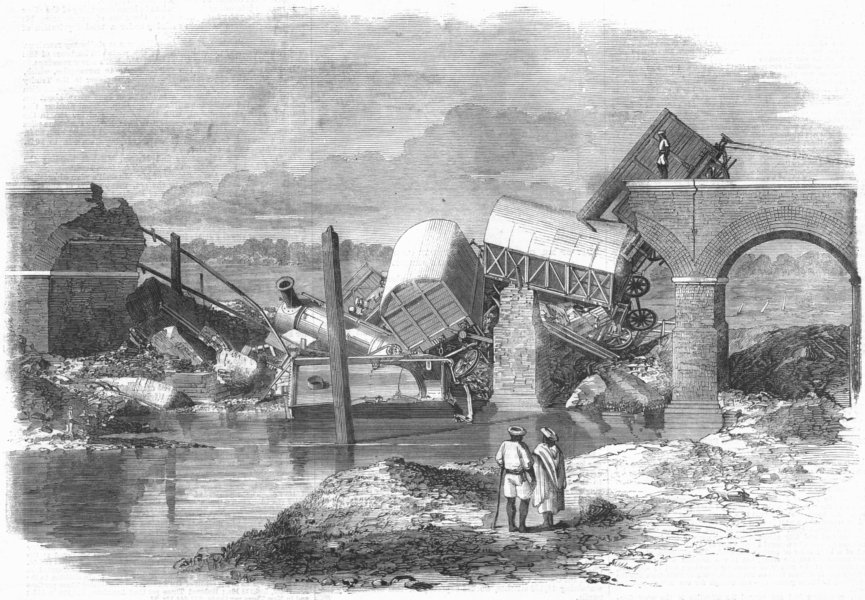
- East Indian Railway wreck
  28 February – India – An accident on the East Indian Railway resulted in a bridge collapsing somewhere on the line between Ahmoodpur and Rampur.

=== 1864 ===
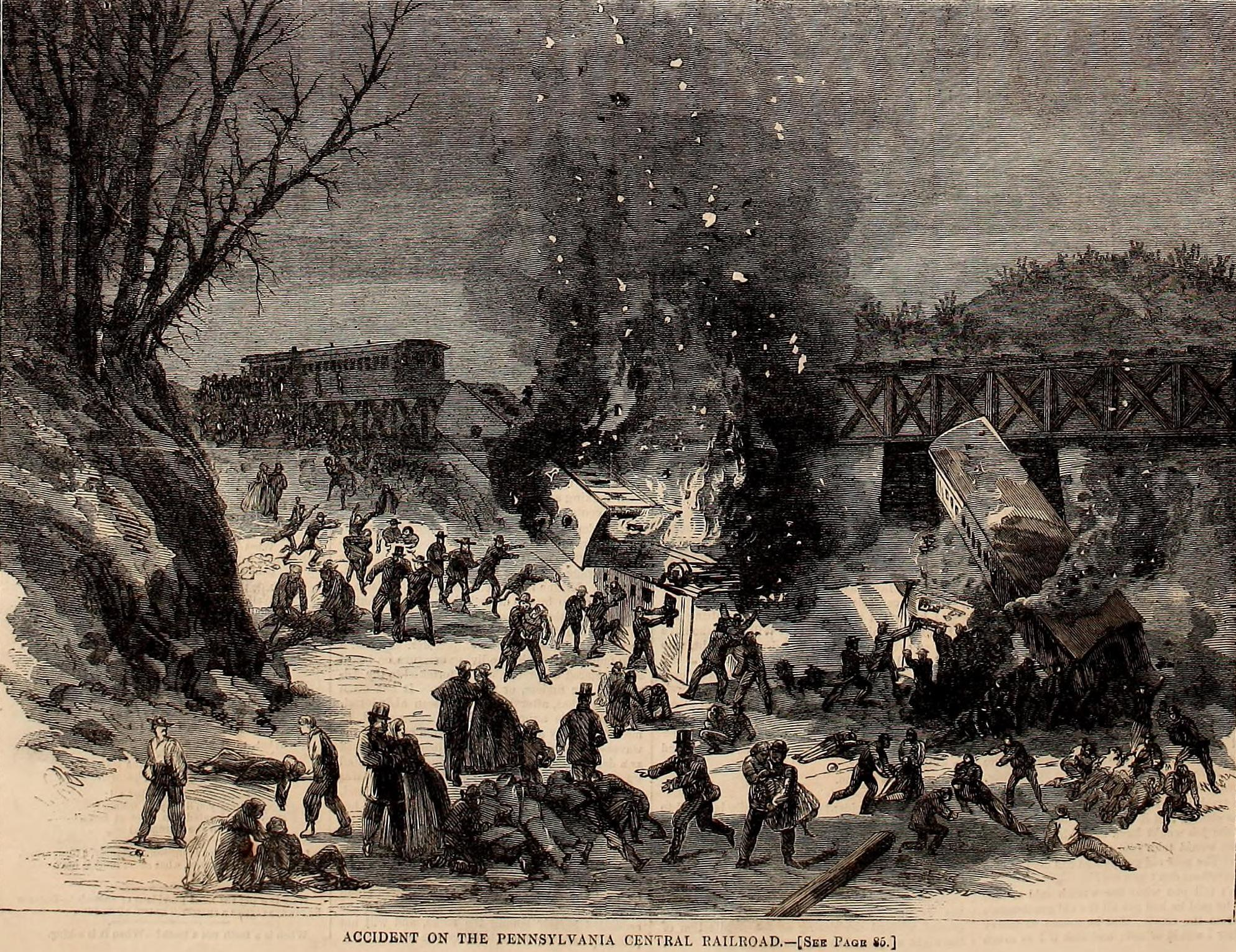
- The derailment near Birmingham
  15 January – United States – A train crossing the Little Juniata River near Birmingham, Pennsylvania derailed, its locomotive and ensuing coaches then plummeting into a ravine. Stoves in the coaches overturned and ignited a fire. While many injuries were reported, no-one was killed.
- 5 May – United Kingdom – At Colne on the Midland Railway, a 0-6-0 engine being prepared to work a goods train to Leeds suffered a boiler explosion, killing the driver and badly injuring the fireman. A woman was struck by a fragment projected into her home. 1/4 mile (400 m) away.
- 9 May – United Kingdom – At Bishop's Road station on the Metropolitan Railway — a 0-6-0 locomotive borrowed from the Great Northern Railway suffered a boiler explosion. Nobody was killed but the station was severely damaged and persons injured included a passenger in another train two tracks away.
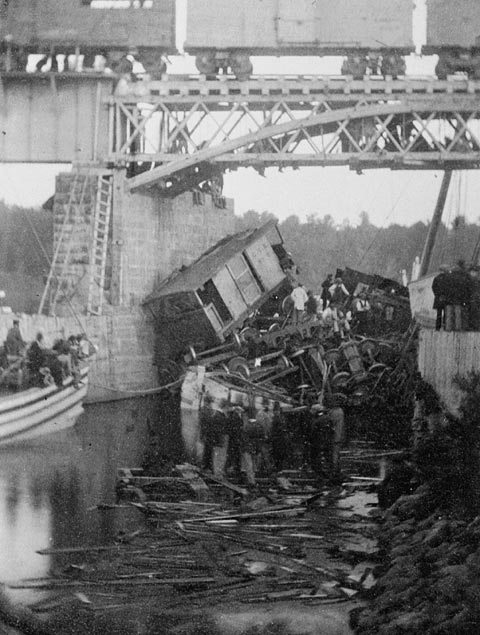
- Immigrant train runs through an open swing bridge near Beloeil, Quebec.
  29 June – Canada – St-Hilaire train disaster – At Beloeil, Quebec a passenger train transporting immigrants failed to stop at a danger signal and attempted to cross an open swing bridge, consequently falling into the Richelieu River. Ninety-nine occupants were killed and 100 injured. As of 2019, this still stands as Canada's deadliest rail accident.
- 15 July – United States – Shohola train wreck – An Erie Railroad passenger train carrying Confederate prisoners-of-war collided head-on with a coal train near Shohola Township, Pennsylvania as the result of a dispatcher's error. Between 60 and 72 people were killed (the official death toll being 65).
- 16 August – United States – An Erie Railroad freight train ran into the rear of a passenger train between Turner's Station and Sloatsburg, New York. A third train ran into the wreckage. Seven persons were killed.
- 21 September – United States – A Pennsylvania Railroad passenger train ran into the rear of a stopped freight train at Thompsontown, Pennsylvania. The wreckage then caught fire. At least six people were killed and thirteen injured.
- 16 December – United Kingdom – A South Eastern Railway ballast train became divided inside Blackheath Tunnel, Kent. An express passenger train runs into the rear portion, killing five people, with two others dying later and many injured.

=== 1865 ===
- 12 May – United Kingdom – An accident occurred on the Irish North Western railway near Enniskillen. A goods train left Derry and ran off the rails. The engine driver, J. McCabe, and the stoker, C. Craven, were killed. Some bullocks in a waggon were also killed.'
- 7 June – United Kingdom – Rednal rail crash – A Great Western Railway excursion train was derailed at Rednal, Shropshire due to excessive speed on track under maintenance. Thirteen people were killed and 30 injured.
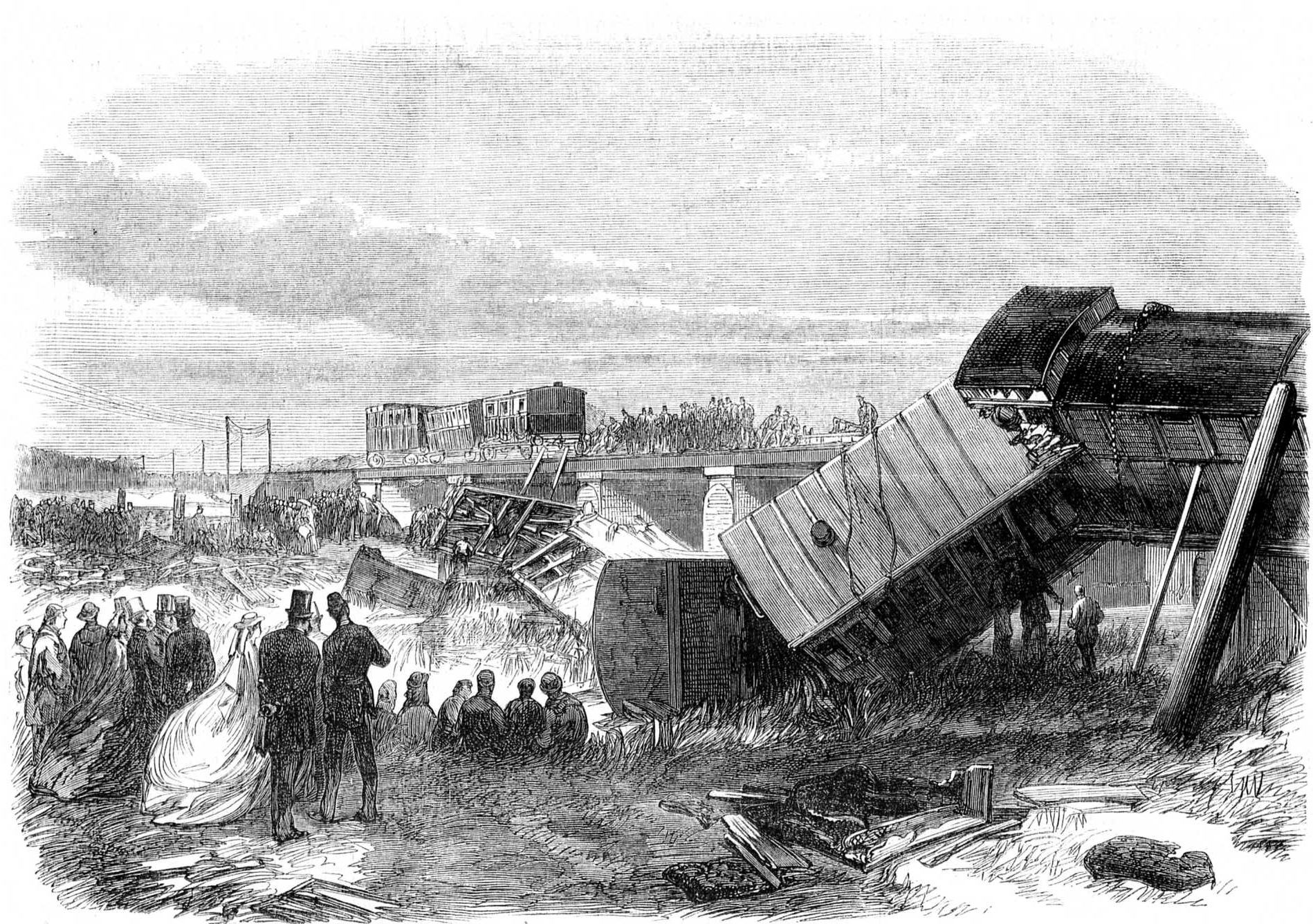
- Crash scene after the Staplehurst accident
  9 June – United Kingdom – Staplehurst rail crash – A South Eastern Railway boat train was derailed on a bridge over the River Beult at Staplehurst, Kent after track workers misread a timetable and removed a rail. Ten people were killed and 49 injured. Author Charles Dickens was amongst the survivors.

=== 1866 ===
- 30 April – United Kingdom – A South Eastern Railway passenger train collided with some goods wagons at Caterham Junction, Surrey due to a signalman's error. Four people were killed.
- 10 June – United Kingdom – Welwyn Tunnel rail crash: A Great Northern Railway freight train was halted in Welwyn North Tunnel due to a burst fire tube. A Midland Railway freight train following it in the same direction crashed into it, and a third freight train going the other way crashed into the wreckage. All three trains were totally destroyed by fire, but the only deaths were two of the crew members.
- 27 August – United States – A boiler explosion on the Petaluma and Haystack Railroad at Petaluma Station killed the engineer and three others and wrecked the railroad's only locomotive.
- 7 September – United States – A train of the New York Central Railway derailed due to a signalman error, causing death of five railway workers.
- 19 December – United Kingdom – During the construction of the new Smithfield Market building adjacent to an open-air section of the Metropolitan Railway in London, a girder fell onto a passing train and three passengers were killed. This is the first fatal accident on an underground train.

=== 1867 ===
- 29 June – United Kingdom – Warrington rail crash – A London and North Western Railway passenger train collided with a freight train at Walton Junction, Warrington, Cheshire due to a signalman's error. Eight people were killed and 70 injured. Lack of interlocking between signals and points is a major contributory factor in the accident.
- 7 August – United States – Plum Creek Railroad Attack – A band of Cheyenne warriors derailed a Union Pacific freight train on August 7, 1867, during construction of the first transcontinental railroad. Boxcars were looted and burned, and four employees were killed.
- Bray, County Wicklow
  9 August – Ireland – A bridge collapsed underneath a passenger train at Bray, County Wicklow. Four persons killed and 12 injured.
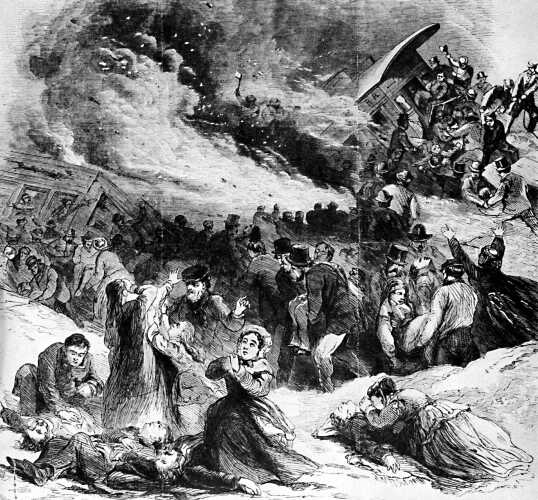
- Angola, New York
  18 December – United States – Angola Horror – The Buffalo-bound New York Express of the Lake Shore and Michigan Southern derailed its last coach and it plunged off a truss bridge into Big Sister Creek just after passing Angola, New York. The next car was also pulled from the track and rolled down the far embankment. Stoves set both coaches on fire and 49 were killed. The cars were relatively easy to derail because they were "compromise cars" designed to run on slightly different track gauges, a practice soon afterwards prohibited.

=== 1868 ===
- 1 February – United Kingdom – An embankment on the approach to the Caersws Railway Bridge on the Cambrian Railways was washed out by flooding, derailing a mail and goods train running from Shrewsbury to Aberystwyth. The two enginemen were killed.
- 4 March – Austria–Hungary (Ukraine) – 1868 Chernivtsi rail accident: collapse of a railway bridge over the Prut River near Chernivtsi, Galicia, damaged by a flood, under the weigh of crossing train caused several of its wagons to fall into the river and death of one person.
- 15 April – United States – A train on the Erie railroad derailed after going over a broken rail. Four passenger cars rolled down an embankment and were ignited by the interior stoves. 26 were killed and 63 injured.
- 20 August – United Kingdom – Abergele rail disaster: A London and North Western Railway freight train was being shunted at Llandulas, Denbighshire. During shunting operations, six wagons ran away downhill towards Abergele, where they collided with an express passenger train. Five of the wagons were carrying paraffin, which exploded and set the wreck of the passenger train on fire. Thirty-three people were killed; the driver of the express is severely burned.
- 5 November – United Kingdom – Great Western Railway locomotive Rob Roy crashed into the rear of a cattle train at Awse Junction, near Newnham, Gloucestershire and was derailed.
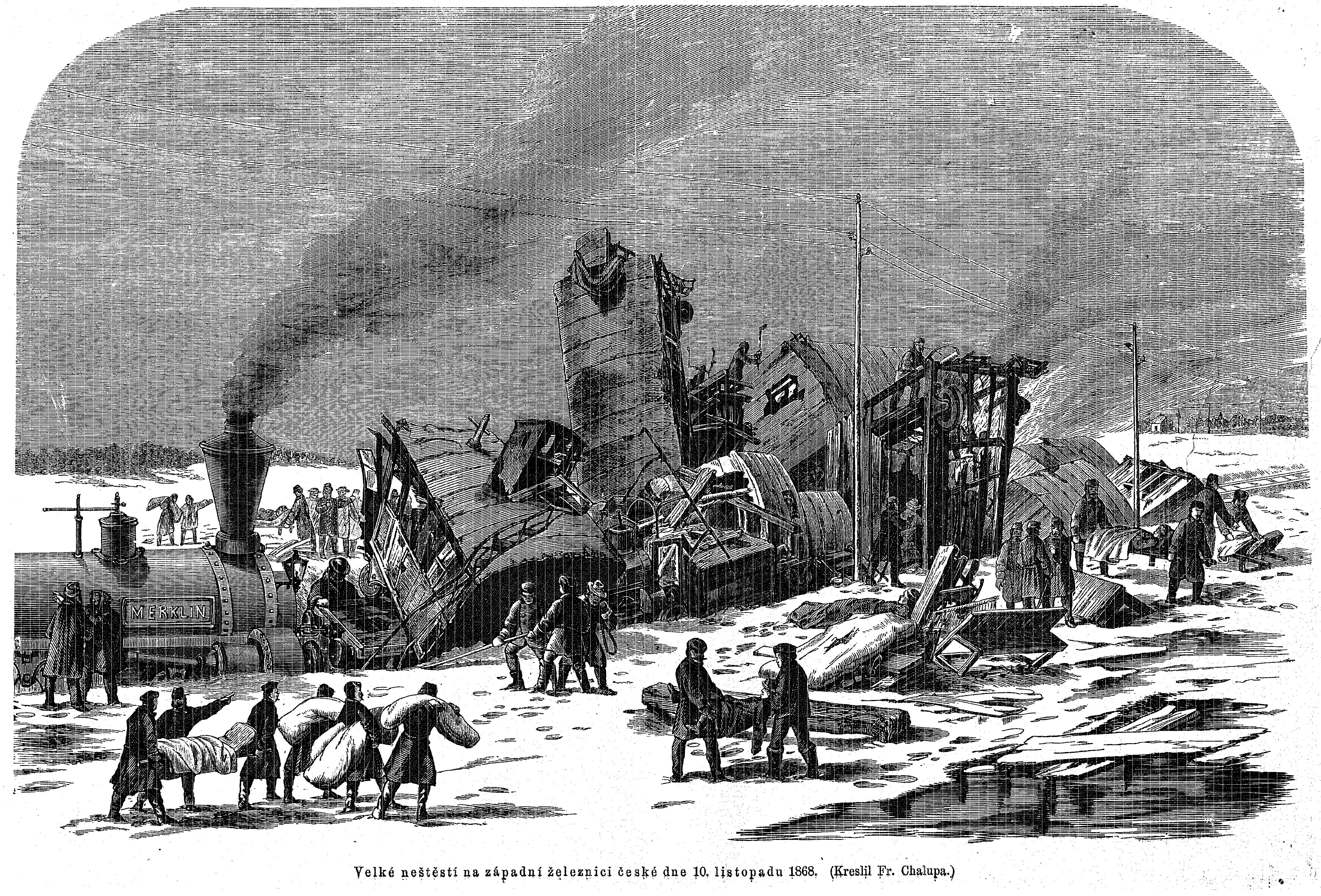
- The Cerhovice collision
  10 November - Austria–Hungary (Czechia) - Cerhovice rail accident: A collision occurs between Cerhovice and Ujezd involving a passenger train and a freight train. 35 passengers died as a result and 80 more injured.

=== 1869 ===
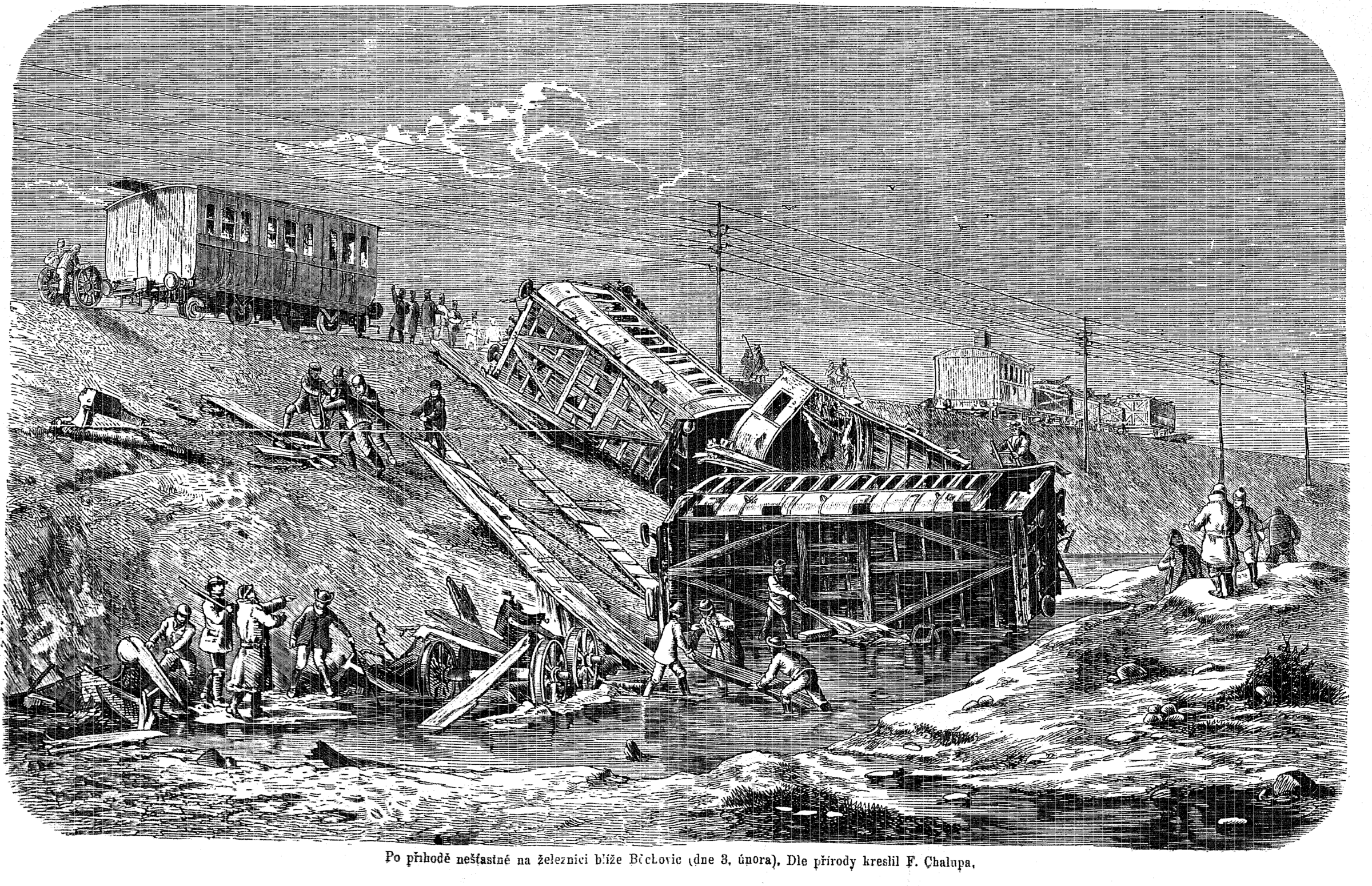
Úvaly train derailment

- 26 January – India – Bhor Ghat rail accident – Bhor Ghat, India: At least 15 people were killed and 35 injured after the Bombay-Pune Mail train substained a brake failure on incline track at the Bhor Ghat Pass, Maharashtra and crashed through a dead-end of the Bhor Ghat Reversing Station track down the railway embankment.
- 3 February – Austria–Hungary (Czechia) – Úvaly rail accident: A passenger train heading to Prague derailed near Úvaly sending several coaches down an embankment. 10 were injured in the accident and the conductor of the train was the only reported fatality.
- 23 April – United States – Hollis, New York: A Long Island Rail Road passenger train was derailed by a broken rail. The rail curls into a "snakehead" and rips out the bottom of one of the cars. Six people were killed, and fourteen injured.
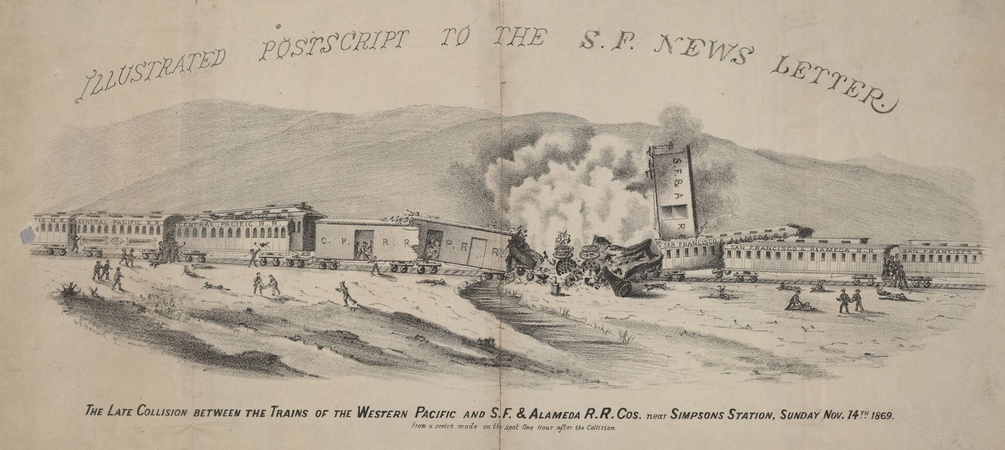
- San Leandro rail collision
  14 November – United States – San Leandro rail collision – San Leandro, California: An errant switchman and poor visibility due to fog led to a head-on collision between an eastbound passenger train from Oakland, with a sleeper car, on the Western Pacific Railroad and an Alameda-bound Alameda Railroad passenger train. Among the fourteen killed was Judge Alexander W. Baldwin of the U.S. District Court of Nevada.

== 1870s ==
=== 1870 ===
- 21 June – United Kingdom – Newark rail crash: The axle of a wagon of a Midland Railway freight train broke at Newark, Nottinghamshire, derailing the train. The derailed wagons fouled an adjacent line. An excursion train collided with the debris. Eighteen persons were killed and 40 are injured.
- 14 September – United Kingdom – Tamworth rail crash: A London and North Western Railway mail train was diverted into a siding at Tamworth station, Staffordshire due to a signalman's error. The train crashed through the buffers and ended up in the River Anker. Three persons were killed.
- 26 November – United Kingdom – An express train crashed into a stationary freight train at Harrow and Wealdstone station on the London and North Western Railway, killing eight people.
- 6 December – United Kingdom – A collision between two North Eastern Railway trains at Brockley Whins claimed five lives and injured 37 people. The cause was a pointsman's error made possible by the lack of interlocking between points and signals.
- 12 December – United Kingdom – Stairfoot rail accident: Due to errors while shunting, ten waggons from a Manchester, Sheffield and Lincolnshire Railway freight train ran away and collided with a passenger train at Stairfoot, Yorkshire. Fifteen persons were killed and 59 injured.
- United Kingdom – A North Eastern Railway freight train overran signals and collided with a London and North Western Railway mail train at St. Nicholas Crossing, Carlisle, Cumberland. Five persons were killed, many more injured. The driver of the North Eastern Railway train was intoxicated.

=== 1871 ===
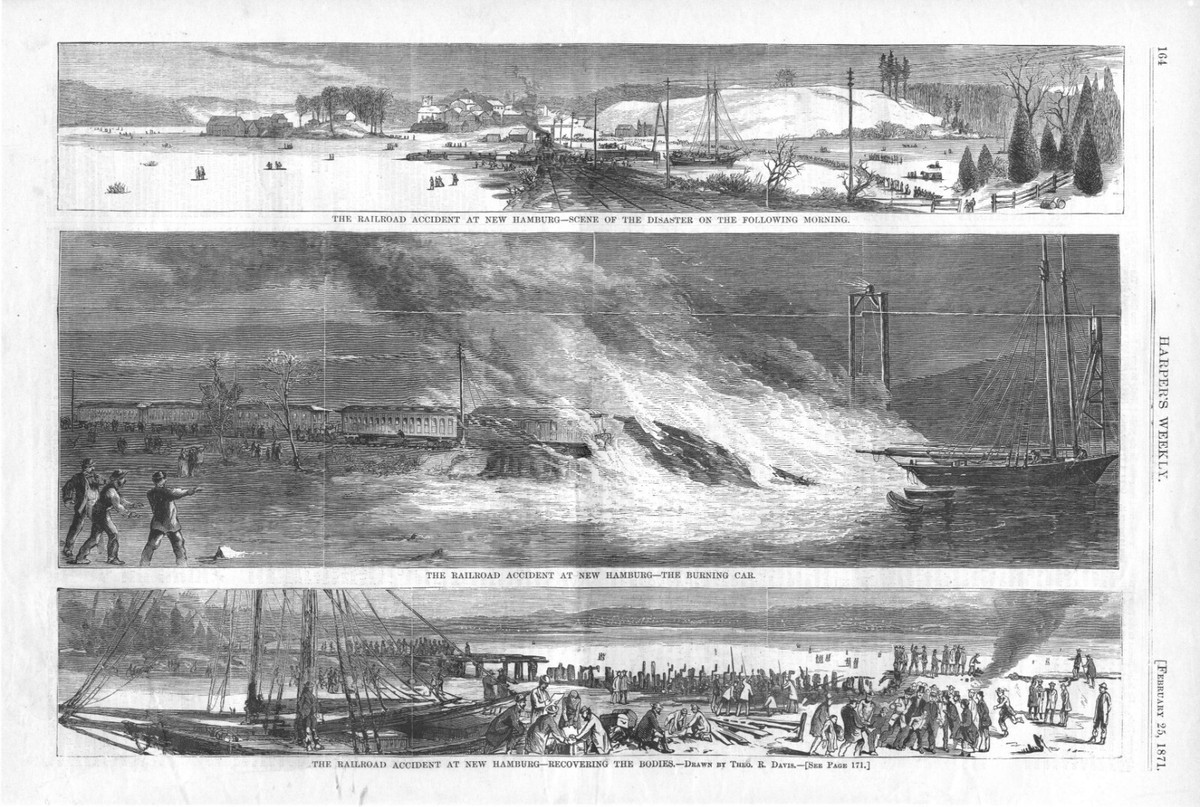
- Three contemporary sketchs of the New Hamburg Disaster
  6 February – United States – New Hamburg rail disaster – A freight train on the Hudson River Railroad, carrying both crude and refined oil, sufferered a broken axle. Because the crew had not threaded the required rope for communication from caboose to locomotive, the engineer remained unaware, and the train kept moving until it derailed at the Wappinger Creek drawbridge, New Hamburg, New York. They and the drawbridge tender tried to warn the following Pacific Express passenger train, but they were not in time, and the collision and resulting fire killed 22 persons.
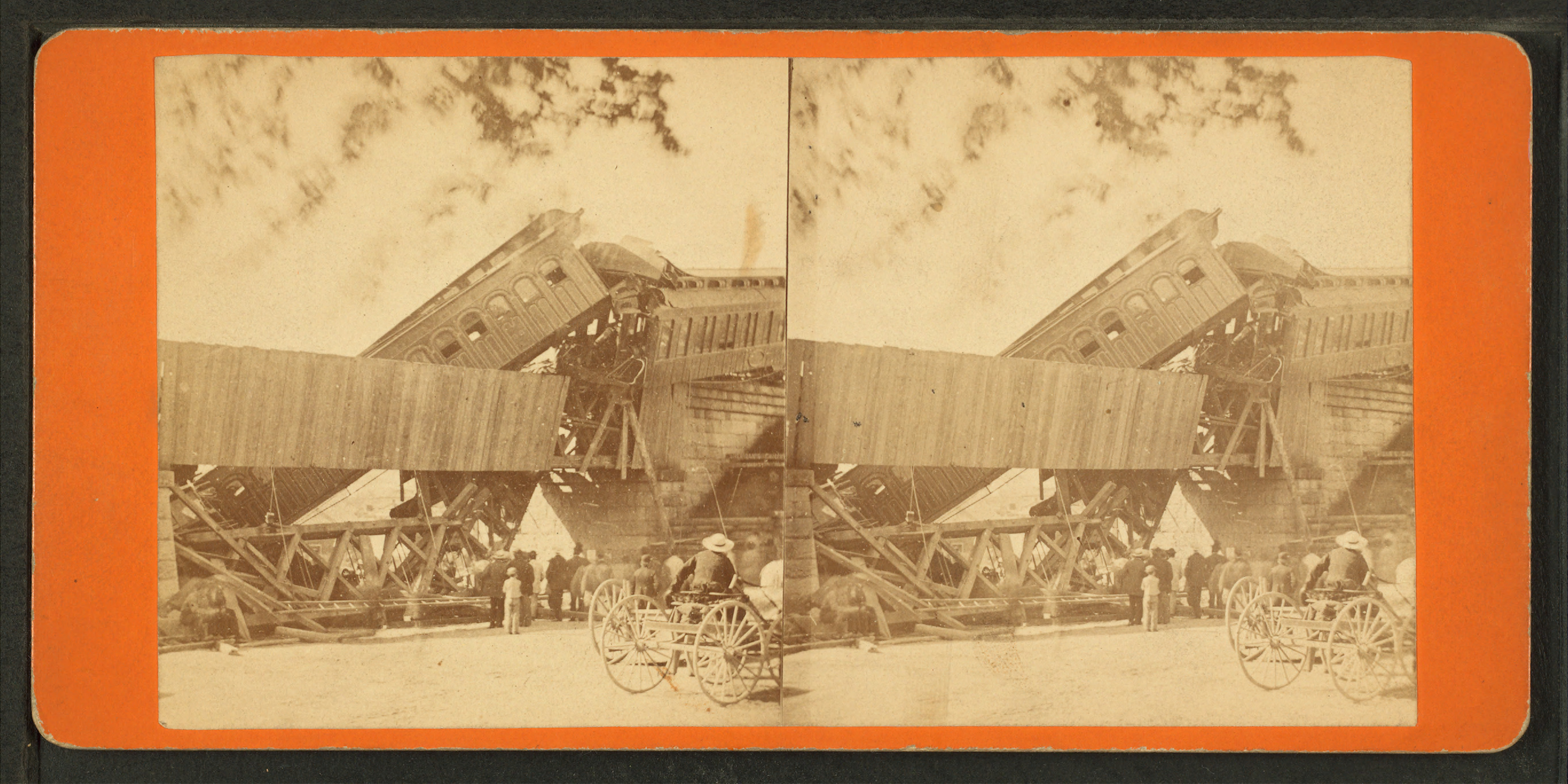
- Bangor, Maine, August 8, 1871
  9 August – United States – A bridge collapsed underneath a Maine Central Railroad Company passenger train at Bangor, Maine. One person was killed and 30 injured.
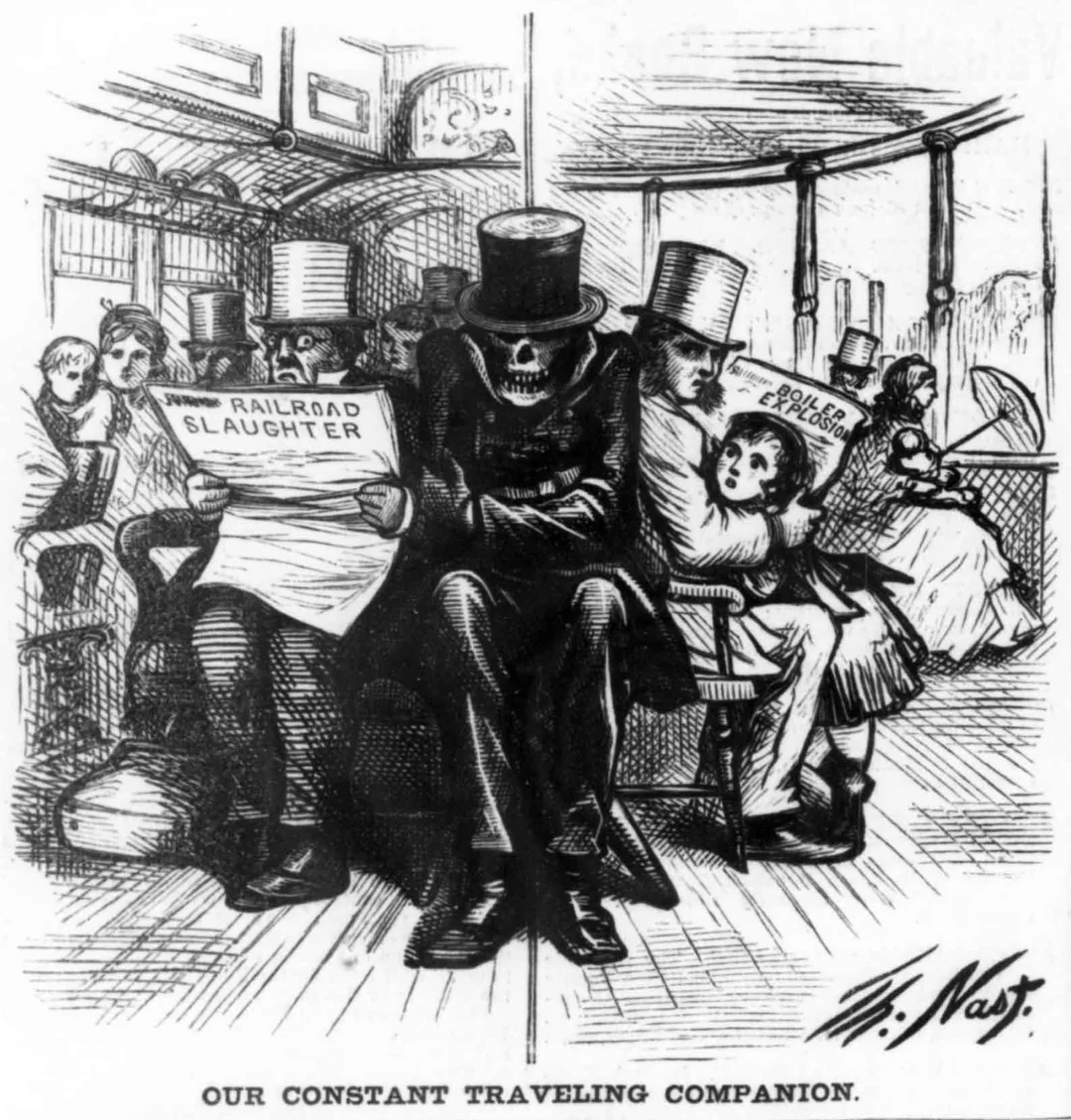
- After the train wreck at Revere Thomas Nast drew this cartoon of the Grim Reaper 16 September 1871 due to the frequent occurrence of fatal Railroad and Steamboat accidents
  26 August – United States – Great Revere train wreck of 1871: A series of dispatching errors allowed the Eastern Railroad's Portland Express to run into the rear of a stalled local train at Revere, Massachusetts. The wreckage caught fire; 29 persons were killed and 57 injured. Several prominent Boston citizens were among the fatalities, bringing much national publicity to the accident.

=== 1872 ===
- 2 October – United Kingdom – Kirtlebridge rail crash – A Caledonian Railway express passenger train collides with a freight train performing shunting operations at Kirtlebridge, Dumfriesshire. Twelve people are killed and fifteen are injured.
- 24 December – United States – Two passenger cars of a Pennsylvania Railroad passenger train fall off a bridge in Portland, New York due to a "broken flange on the tender". Thirty people are killed and at least eighteen are injured.

=== 1873 ===
- 30 March – United Kingdom – A Great Northern Railway excursion train collided with two carriages at Bourne, Lincolnshire. No-one was seriously injured, but the carriages and crossing gates were destroyed.
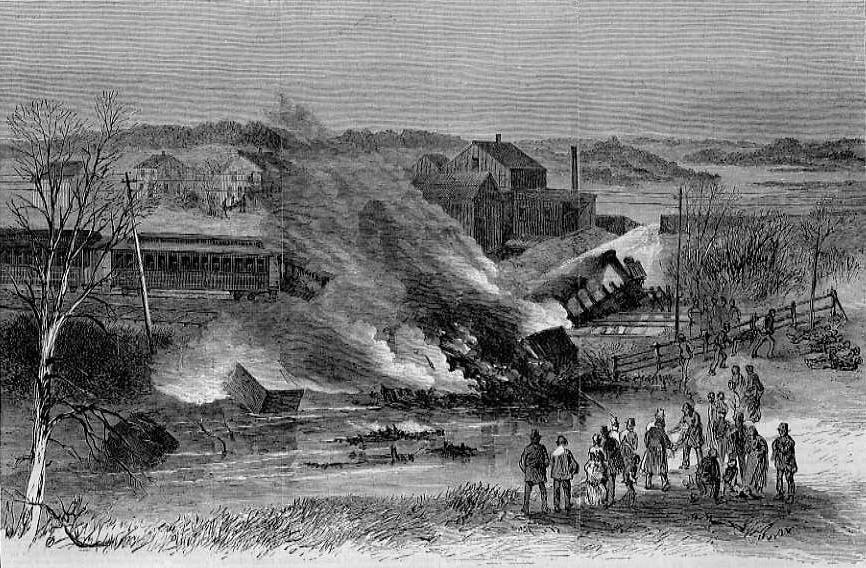
- Scene of the Railroad Disaster at Meadow Brook, Rhode Island, a wood engraving from a sketch by Theodore R. Davis, published in Harper's Weekly, 10 May 1873. The accident occurred on 19 April 1873, at Wood River Junction.
  19 April – United States – A passenger train was derailed at Meadow Brook, Rhode Island, near Wood River Junction, due to a bridge being washed away in a dam collapse. Nine passengers were killed.
- 6 May – Austria-Hungary – 1873 Pest rail accident – A freight train carrying railroad labourers was derailed at the unfinished track near future Budapest-Nyugati Railway Terminal. Twenty-six persons were killed and about 50 injured.
- 2 August – United Kingdom – Wigan rail crash – A London and North Western Railway passenger train derailed at Wigan North Western station, possibly due to excessive speed over facing points. Thirteen people were killed and 30 injured.
- 12 August – Italy – A Società per le strade ferrate romane passenger train in service between Rome and Florence derailed near the town of Orte (Lazio) after hitting two cattle standing on the tracks. Two persons were killed and more than 40 injured.
- 2 December – United Kingdom – At Menheniot on the Cornwall Railway, a porter-signalman named Pratt instructed a down goods train to proceed by calling out "Right away, Dick" to its guard, Richard Wills. Unfortunately, an up goods train was also at the station and its guard, Richard Scantlebury, thought the instruction was for him; by the time Pratt realized this, Scantlebury has already told his driver to start. Their train collided with another down goods before reaching St Germans, injuring several crewmen and killing one.

=== 1874 ===
- 27 January – United Kingdom – Bo'ness Junction rail crash – A North British Railway express passenger train collided with a freight train at Bo'ness Junction, Stirlingshire. Sixteen persons were killed and 28 injured.
- 10 September – United Kingdom – Thorpe rail accident – Two Great Eastern Railway passenger trains were in a head-on collision at Thorpe St. Andrew, Norfolk, due to irregular dispatching procedures. Twenty-five persons were killed and more than 100 injured. The accident led directly to the introduction of automatic control systems to manage traffic on single-track railways.
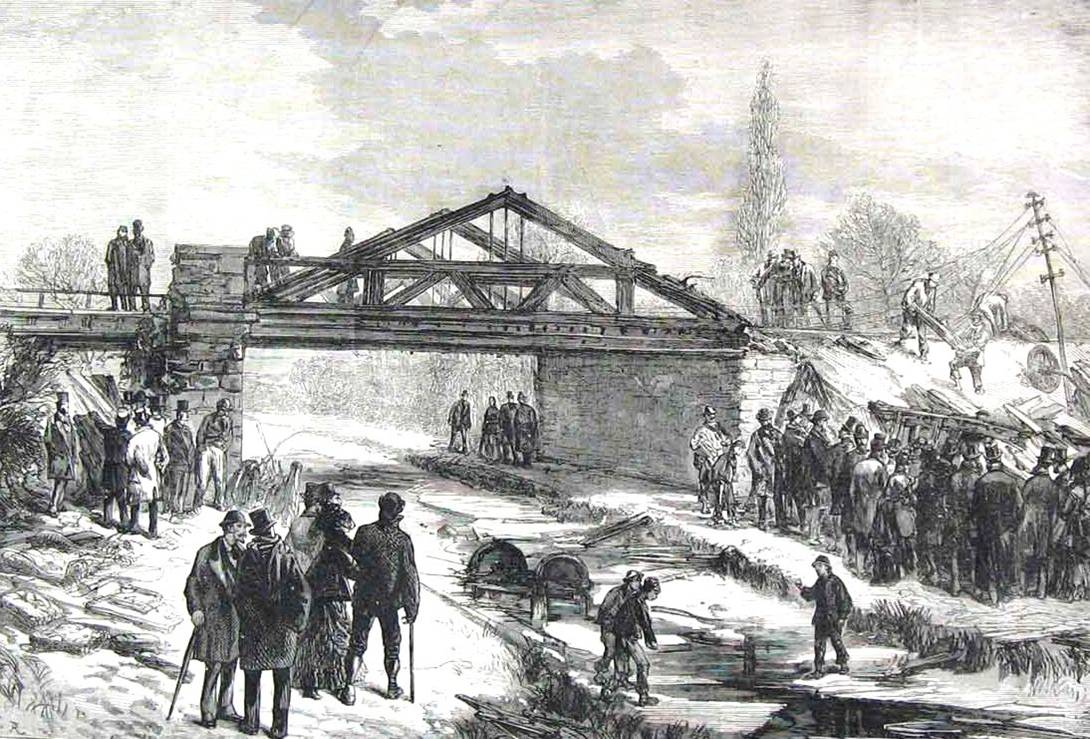
- Shipton-on-Cherwell
  24 December – United Kingdom – Shipton-on-Cherwell train crash – A Great Western Railway passenger train was derailed by a fractured wheel at Shipton-on-Cherwell, Oxfordshire. Thirty-four persons were killed and 69 injured. Poor communications and the lack of continuous brakes exacerbated the disaster.

=== 1875 ===
- 6 July – Chile – A bridge collapsed undereath the overnight train between Valparaíso and Santiago in Chile, killing nine people.
- 28 August – United Kingdom – A passenger train overran signals and collided with the rear end of an excursion train at Kildwick, Yorkshire. Seven persons were killed and 39 injured.
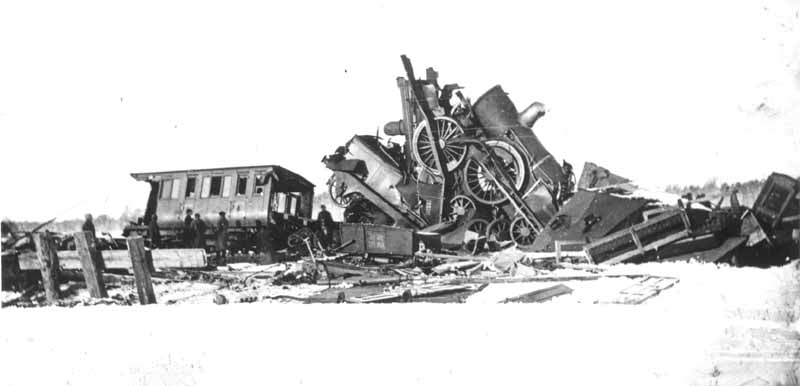
- Lagerlunda rail accident, 1875
  15 November – Sweden – Lagerlunda rail accident – Unclear signalling led to a head-on-collision of two passenger trains near Lagerlunda, Östergötland. Nine persons were killed.
- 18 November – United Kingdom – Two London, Chatham and Dover Railway trains collided at Ludgate Hill, London.

=== 1876 ===
- 21 January – United Kingdom – Abbots Ripton rail accident: A Great Northern Railway express passenger train passed a signal jammed in the clear position during a blizzard and collided with the rear end of a freight train at Abbots Ripton, Huntingdonshire, and a train in the opposite direction then collided with the wreckage. Thirteen passengers were killed and 59 people are injured.
- 14 April – United Kingdom – A Great Northern Railway express train ran into a mail train at Corby, Lincolnshire because signals were jammed in the clear position in a blizzard.
- 16 June – United States – A trestle bridge collapsed underneath a Blue Ridge Railroad train bound from Belton, South Carolina to Anderson Court House, South Carolina. All five persons on board were killed.
- 7 August – United Kingdom – Radstock rail accident – A variety of errors led to two Somerset and Dorset Joint Railway passenger trains colliding head-on at Radstock, Somerset. Fifteen passengers were killed.
- 23 December – United Kingdom – A Great Northern Railway express train overran signals and crashed into a number of wagons at Arlesley Sidings, Bedfordshire. Six persons were killed.
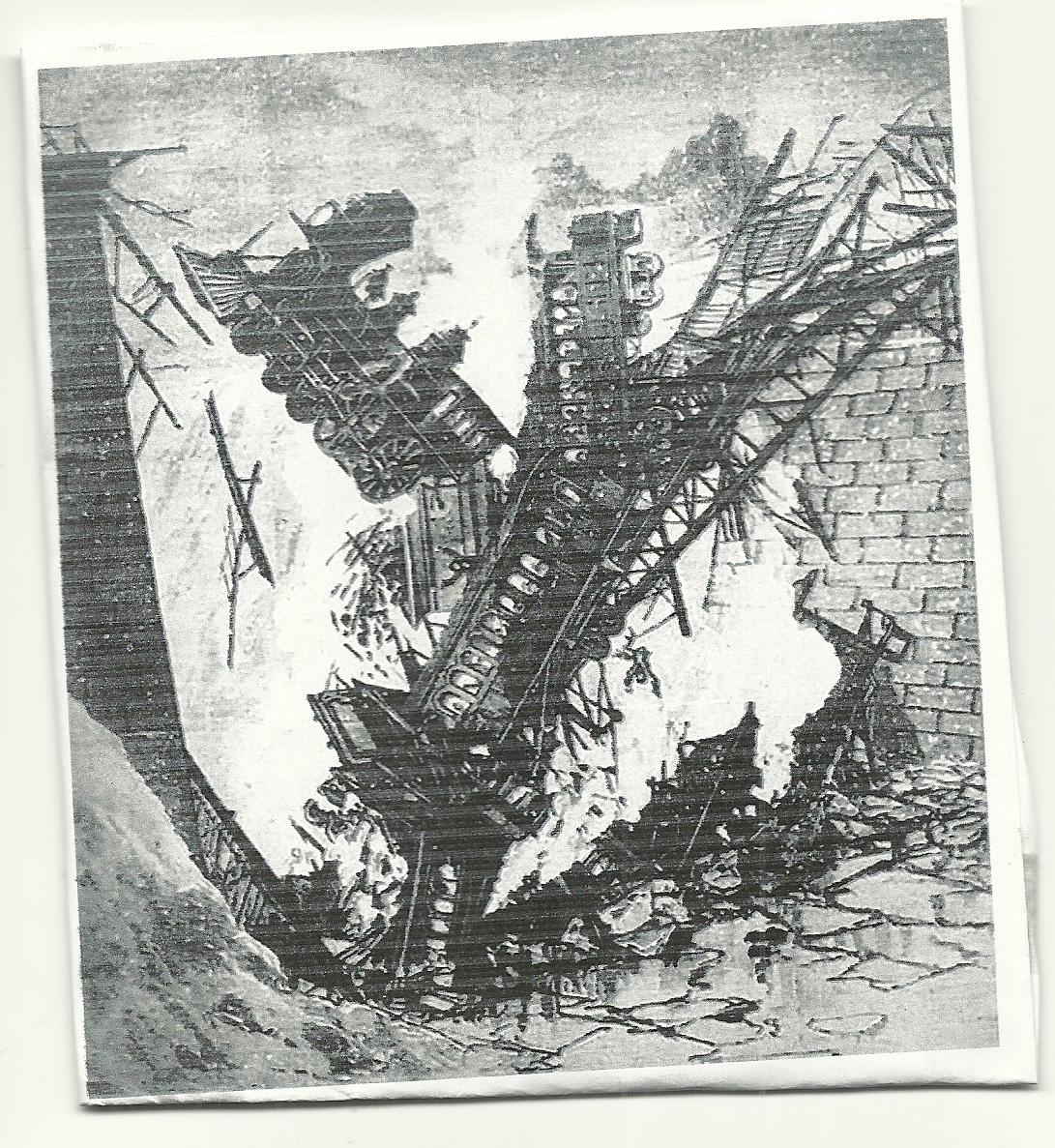
- Ashtabula Bridge collapse
  29 December – United States – Ashtabula River railroad disaster: A bridge collapsed underneath a Lake Shore and Michigan Southern Railway passenger train at Ashtabula, Ohio. The train fell into the frozen creek 70 feet (21 m) below. A fire was started by the car stoves. Dozens of people were killed, but sources disagree as to how many — perhaps as many as 92. The renowned hymn-writer Philip Bliss and his wife are believed to be among an estimated 19 to 25 unidentified victims.

=== 1877 ===
- 25 March – United Kingdom – An express passenger train was derailed at Morpeth, Northumberland due to faulty track.
- 27 March – United States – A train on the Jackson, Lansing, and Saginaw Railroad, fatally injured one.
- 4 October – United States – A mixed train of the Pickering Valley Railroad fell from a washed-out embankment near Kimberton, Pennsylvania, killing seven and injuring dozens.

=== 1878 ===
- 11 January – United Kingdom – Great Northern Railway – The Flying Scotsman collided with a freight train at Welwyn Garden City, Hertfordshire, after which a local passenger train collided with the wreckage.
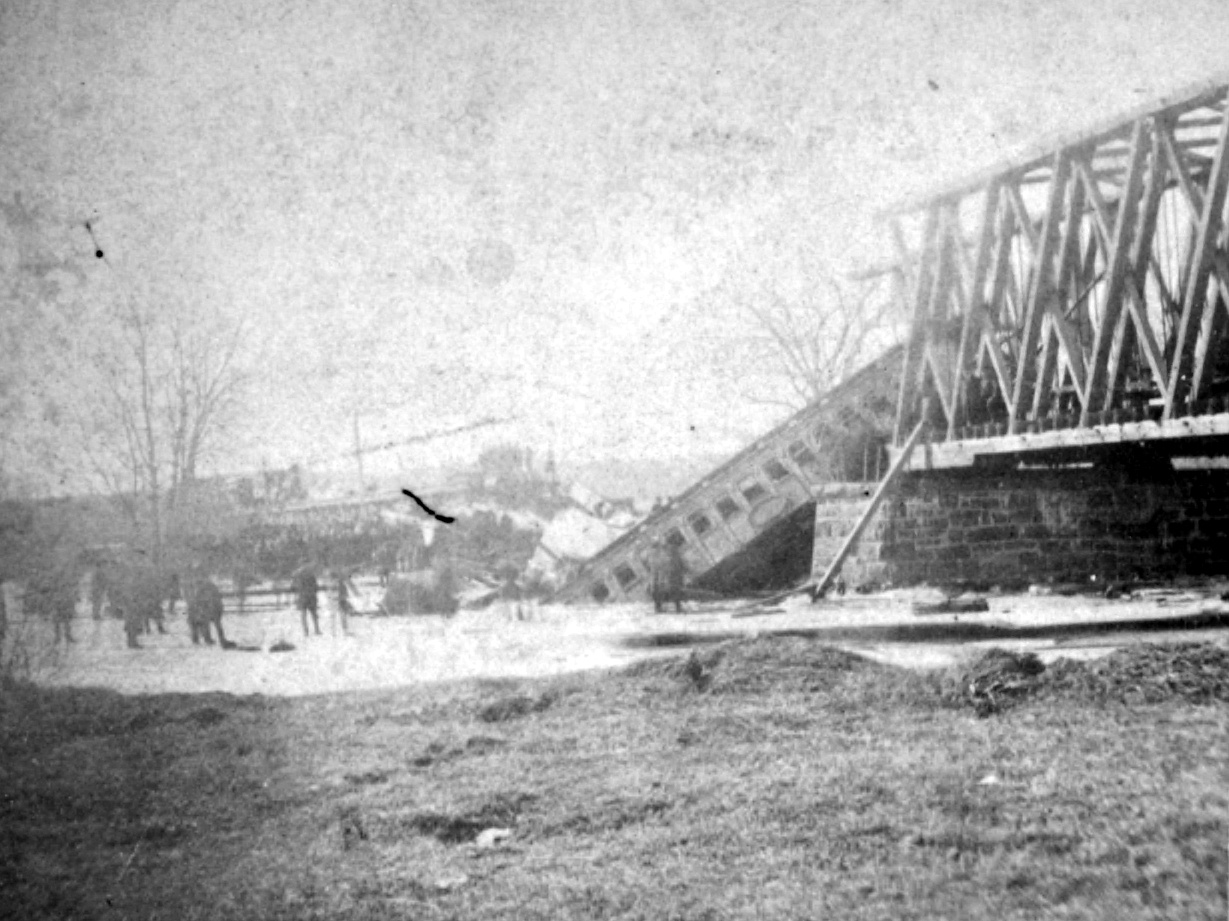
- Tariffville train accident
  15 January – United States – 1878 Tariffville train crash – A rail bridge in Tariffville, Connecticut failed, resulting in the train falling into an icy river. Thirteen were killed and 70 injured.
- 21 May – United States – A Kansas Pacific R.R. Freight train was caught in a bridge washout at Kiowa Creek, Colorado; Three persons were killed.
- 31 August – United Kingdom – A London, Chatham and Dover Railway passenger train collided with goods wagons at Sittingbourne, Kent due to errors by a shunter and the two guards of a freight train. Five persons were killed.
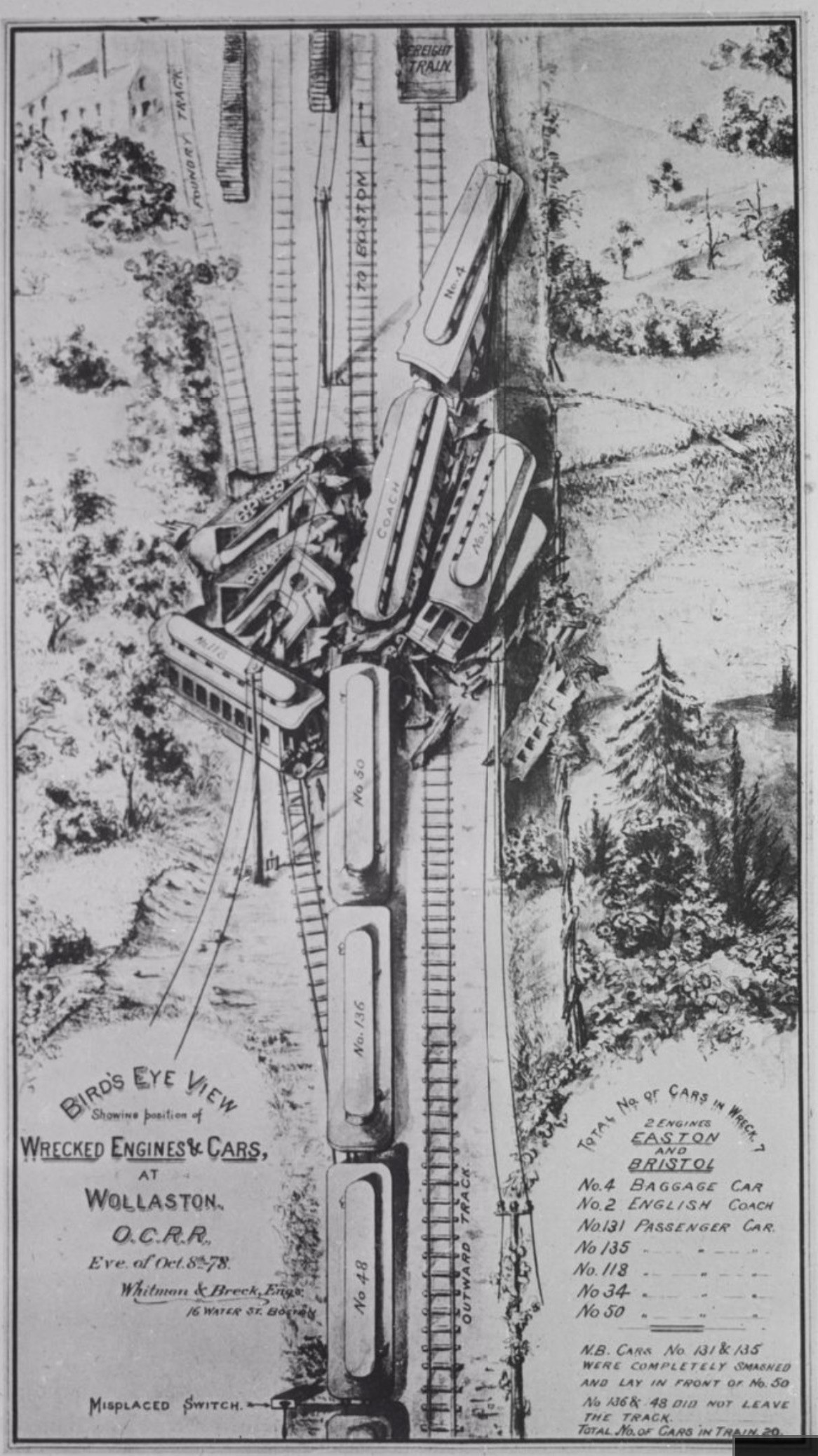
- Wollaston disaster
  8 October – United States – Wollaston disaster – A train in Quincy, Massachusetts carrying over 1,000 passengers ran over an open switch, resulting a serious derailment.

=== 1879 ===
- 15 January – United Kingdom – Two hounds from the Pytchley Hunt were killed and a number injured while chasing a fox near the Kilsby Tunnel on the London and Birmingham Railway, when a train ran through the pack.
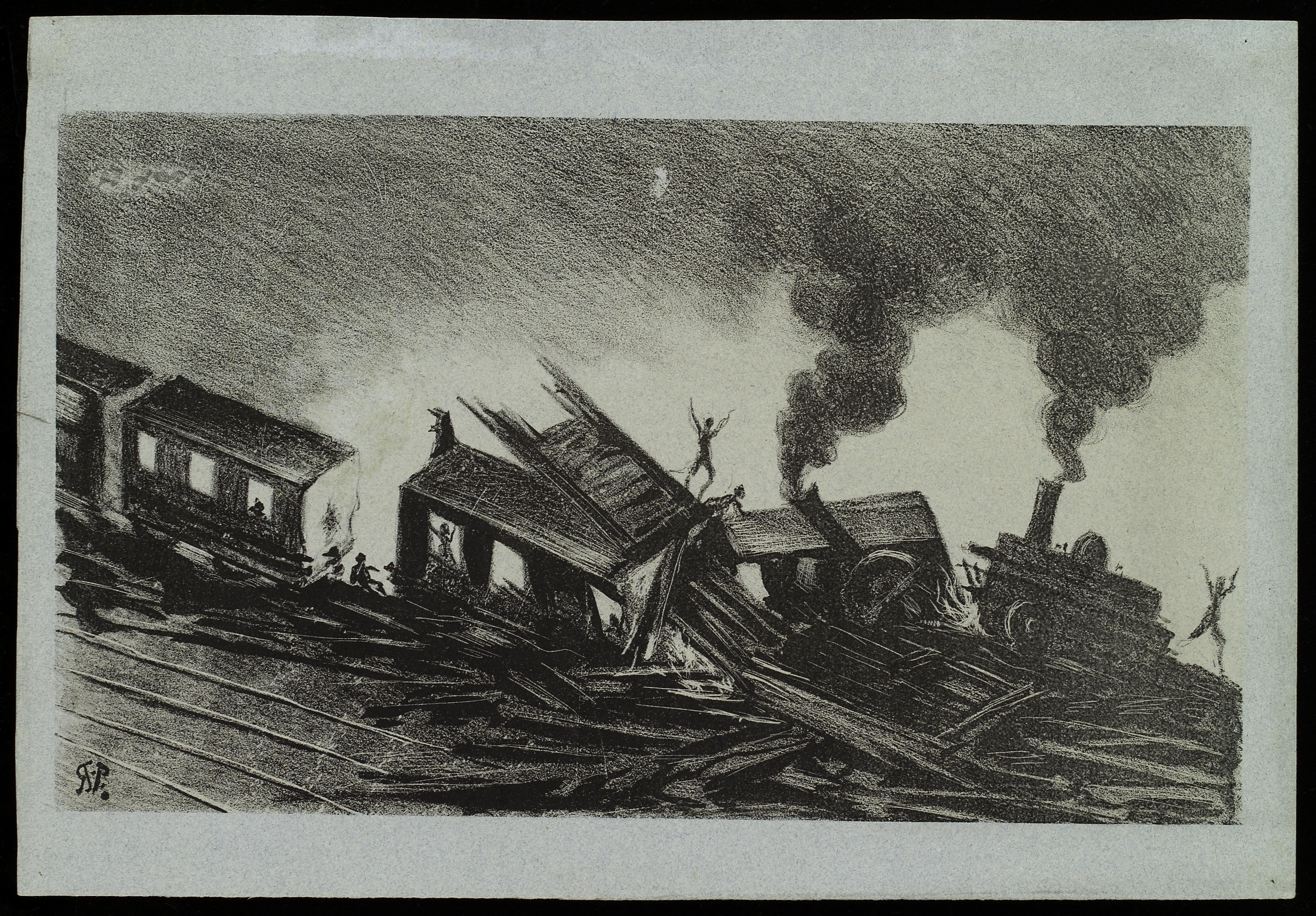
- Lithograph of the La Chapelle train collision by Paul Van Rijssel
  17 January – France – A runaway locomotive collided with a passenger train in La Chapelle. One of the passengers was Paul Gachet who survived the wreck with an injury to his liver.
- 18 (or 25) January – Belgium – Two passengers and the engine driver were killed when the express train from Brussels to Lille and Calais left the line at Bassilly.
- 22 January – United Kingdom – A heavy goods train from Glasgow was travelling too fast on the Tay Rail Bridge and a number of carriages left the track when the guard applied the brakes. The same bridge would be the scene of a much worse accident less than a year later (see below).
- 22 January – United Kingdom – Three carriages left the line after a collision between trains from Farringdon Street and Aldersgate Street at Snow-Hill, on the London, Chatham and Dover Railway.
- 5 (or 12) February – United Kingdom – A cattle train ran into a ballast train near Widnes Junction on the London and North Western Railway. The driver and stoker jumped out as the cattle train engine ran down the embankment.
- 4 April – United Kingdom – A goods train ran off the Highland Railway line, near Perth, destroying 80 yards (73 m) of track.
- 17 May – United Kingdom – An express train from Glasgow came off the line when it collided with a goods train near Dunfermline railway station on the North British Railway. The driver of the express died.
- 13 June – United Kingdom – A train carrying show cattle from the Royal Cornwall Show was hit by a Plymouth-to-Penzance goods train at Truro railway station. One van was "smashed to pieces", there was one minor injury to the goods train driver, and none to the cattle.
- 26 July – United Kingdom – Lancashire and Yorkshire Railway. The 7:30 train for Warrington failed to stop and hit a Rainford train at Wigan Station. Several third-class carriages were knocked off the rails.
- July/August – France – An accident between Nancy and Paris killed five perons and injured eleven.
- 16 August – France – A passenger train and a goods train collided near Montséret killing fifteen and injuring thirty-six.
- 29 August – United Kingdom – The Scottish mail train derailed between Hendon and Mill Hill due to the track subsiding following heavy rain. The driver and fireman were both severely injured.
- 24 September – United Kingdom – A Great Western Railway train from Plymouth to Tavistock derailed outside Marsh Mills railway station.
- 27 September – United Kingdom – London, Brighton and South Coast Railway B1 class 2-4-0 locomotive 174 Fratton suffered a boiler explosion at Lewes, East Sussex while hauling a passenger train. The accident was due to the incorrect setting of its safety valves. One person killed and two injured.
- 12 October – United Kingdom – The 10:10 am passenger train from Derby ran into seven empty carriages at Nottingham station, resulting in eight injured and considerable damage to the rolling stock.
- 1 December – United Kingdom – North Liverpool Extension Line. The train from Walton hit an engine at Brunswick Dock, Liverpool. One man was killed and four injured.
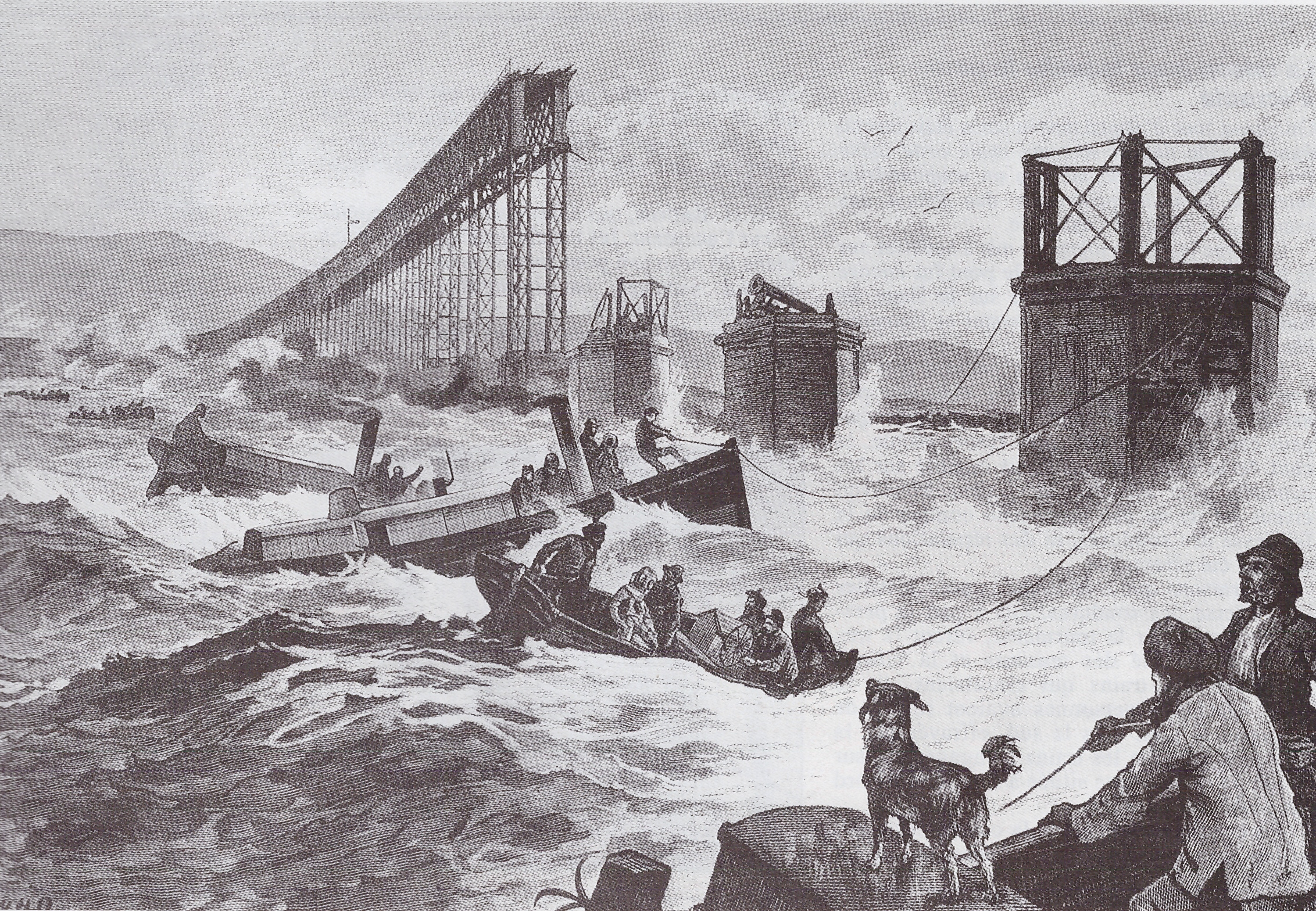
- Tay Bridge collapse
  28 December – United Kingdom – Tay Bridge disaster – The Tay Rail Bridge collapsed in a violent storm while a North British Railway passenger train was crossing it. There were no survivors, with the total estimated at seventy-five lives lost, although the actual total was fifty-nine. The subsequent investigation concludes that "the bridge was badly designed, badly constructed and badly maintained" and laid the major blame on the designer, Sir Thomas Bouch. William McGonagall produces his epic poem The Tay Bridge Disaster to commemorate the event. The disaster shocked engineers into creating an improved crossing both on the Tay, as well as the famous Forth Bridge.

== See also ==
- List of London Underground accidents
- Rail transport

== Sources ==
- Abdill, George B. (1959). Pacific Slope Railroads. Seattle: Superior Publishing.
- Balkwill, Richard; Marshall, John (1993). The Guinness Book of Railway Facts and Feats (6th ed.). Guinness Publishing. ISBN 978-0-85112-707-1.
- Beebe, Lucius & Clegg, Charles (1952). Hear the train blow; a pictorial epic of America in the railroad age. New York: Grosset & Dunlap. ASIN B000I83FTC.
- Bengtsson, Bengt-Arne (2007). Från Östra stambanan till Ostlänken/Götalandsbanan (in Swedish). Atremi: Atremi. ISBN 978-91-85487-63-9.
- Chandler, Alfred D Jr. (1977). The Visible Hand. Cambridge, Mass. and London, England: The Belknap Press of Harvard University Press. ISBN 978-0-674-94051-2.
- Derrick, Samuel Melanchthon (1930). Centennial History of South Carolina Railroad. Columbia, South Carolina: The State Company.
- Earnshaw, Alan (1990). Trains in Trouble: Vol. 6. Penryn: Atlantic Books. ISBN 0-906899-37-0.
- Earnshaw, Alan (1991). Trains in Trouble: Vol. 7. Penryn: Atlantic Books. ISBN 0-906899-50-8.
- Earnshaw, Alan (1993). Trains in Trouble: Vol. 8. Penryn: Atlantic Books. ISBN 0-906899-52-4.
- Griswold, Wesley S. (1969). Train Wreck!. Stephen Greene Press. ISBN 0-8289-0099-X.
- Haine, Edgar A. (1993). Railroad Wrecks. New York: Cornwall Books. ISBN 978-0-8453-4844-4.
- "Inquests taken before John Charsley, Esq". Bucks Herald. 9 March 1839. p. 3.
- Hall, Stanley (1990). The Railway Detectives. London: Ian Allan. ISBN 0-7110-1929-0.
- Hewison, Christian H. (1983). Locomotive Boiler Explosions. Newton Abbot: David & Charles. ISBN 0-7153-8305-1.
- Hoole, Ken (1983). Trains in Trouble: Vol. 4. Truro: Atlantic Books. ISBN 0-906899-07-9.
- Jackson, Alan A. (1986). London's Metropolitan Railway. Newton Abbot, England: David & Charles. ISBN 0-7153-8839-8.
- Karr, Ronald D. (1995). The Rail Lines of Southern New England – A Handbook of Railroad History. Branch Line Press. ISBN 978-0-942147-02-5.
- Kidner, R. W. (1977) [1963]. The South Eastern and Chatham Railway. Tarrant Hinton: The Oakwood Press.
- Leslie, Frank (1882-01-21). Illustrated Newspaper. Vol. LIII, no. 1374. New York. p. 1.
- Reed, Robert C. (1968). Train Wrecks – A Pictorial History of Accidents on the Main Line. New York: Bonanza Books. ISBN 978-0-517-32897-2.
- Rich, Peggy Burton; Whitehurst, Marion Ann (1994). The Pickens Sentinel, Pickens Court House, South Carolina, 1872–1893, Historical and Genealogical Abstracts. Vol. 1. Bowie, Maryland: Heritage Books, Inc. ISBN 978-1-55613-985-7.
- Rolt, L.T.C.; Kichenside, Geoffrey (1982) [1955]. Red for Danger (4th ed.). Newton Abbot: David & Charles. ISBN 978-0-7153-8362-9.
- Shaw, Robert B. (1978). A History of Railroad Accidents, Safety Precautions and Operating Practices. LCCN 78104064.
- Shepard, W. A. (1857). Full Details of the Railway Disaster of the 12th of March, 1857, at the Desjardin Canal on the Line of the Great Western Railway. W.A. Shepard.
- Trevena, Arthur (1980). Trains in Trouble: Vol. 1. Redruth: Atlantic Books. ISBN 0-906899-01-X.
- Trevena, Arthur (1981). Trains in Trouble: Vol. 2. Redruth: Atlantic Books. ISBN 0-906899-03-6.
- Vaughan, Adrian (2003) [2000]. Tracks to Disaster. Hersham: Ian Allan. ISBN 0-7110-2985-7.
- Wragg, David (2004). Signal Failure: Politics & Britain's Railways. Stroud: Sutton Publishing. ISBN 978-0-7509-3293-6.
