= Cobourg =

- Town (lower-tier)
- Town of Cobourg
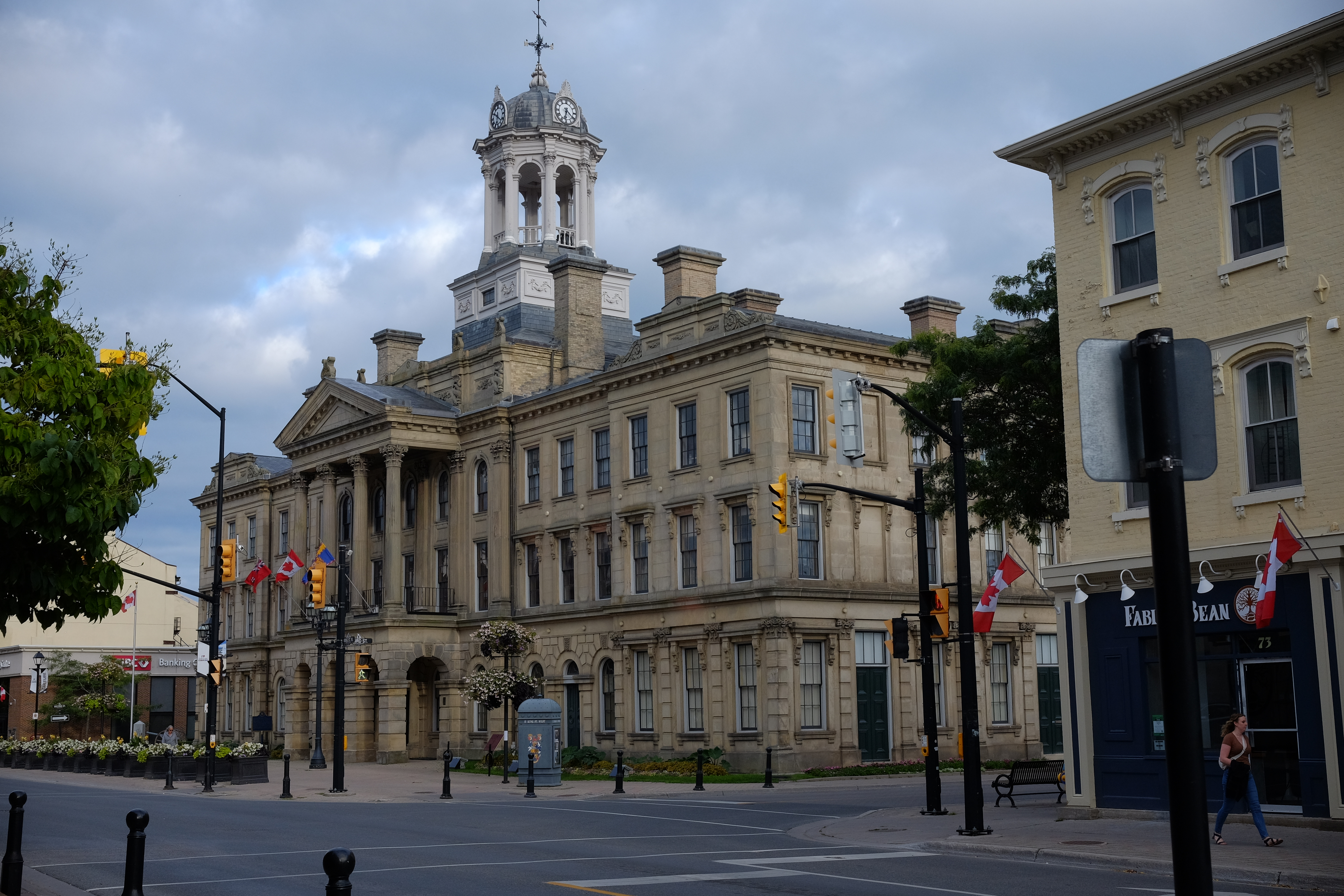
- Victoria Hall (Cobourg) by Kivas Tully
- Nicknames: Ontario's Feel Good Town
- Motto: Our Strength Is In Our Unanimity
- Interactive map of Cobourg
- Location within Northumberland County Location within Southern Ontario
- Coordinates: 43°58′N 78°10′W
- Country: Canada
- Province: Ontario
- County: Northumberland
- Settled: 1798
- Incorporated: 1837 (town)

Government
  - Mayor: Lucas Cleveland
  - Deputy Mayor: Nicole Beatty
  - Governing Body: Cobourg Town Council
  - MP: Philip Lawrence (Northumberland—Clarke, CPC)
  - MPP: David Piccini (Northumberland—Peterborough South, PC)

Area
  - Land: 22.41 km^{2} (8.65 sq mi)

Population (2021)
  - Total: 20,519 ▲
  - Density: 915.7/km^{2} (2,372/sq mi)
- Time zone: UTC−5 (EST)
  - Summer (DST): UTC−4 (EDT)
- Postal Code FSA: K9A
- Area codes: 905, 289, 365, 742
- Highways: Highway 401; Highway 2 (Formerly)
- GNBC Code: FARXE
- Website: www.cobourg.ca

Cobourg (/ˈkoʊbɜːrɡ/ KOH-burg) is a town in the Canadian province of Ontario, located in Southern Ontario 95 km (59 mi) east of Toronto and 62 km (39 mi) east of Oshawa. It is the largest town in and seat of Northumberland County. Its nearest neighbour is Port Hope, 7 km (4 mi) to the west. It is located along Highway 401 (exits 472 and 474) and the former Highway 2 (now Northumberland County Road 2). To the south, Cobourg borders Lake Ontario. To the north, east and west, it is surrounded by Hamilton Township.

== History ==
The land which present-day Cobourg occupies was previously inhabited by Mississauga (Anishinaabemowin-speaking) peoples. The settlements that make up today's Cobourg were founded by United Empire Loyalists in 1798 within Northumberland County, Home District, Province of Upper Canada. Some of the founding fathers and early settlers were Eliud Nickerson, Joseph Ash, Zacheus Burnham and Asa Allworth Burnham. The Town was originally a group of smaller villages such as Amherst and Hardscrabble, which were later named Hamilton. In 1808 it became the district town for the Newcastle District. It was renamed Cobourg in 1819, in recognition of the marriage of Princess Charlotte Augusta of Wales to Prince Leopold of Saxe-Coburg-Saalfeld (later Saxe-Coburg and Gotha, who would later become King of Belgium).

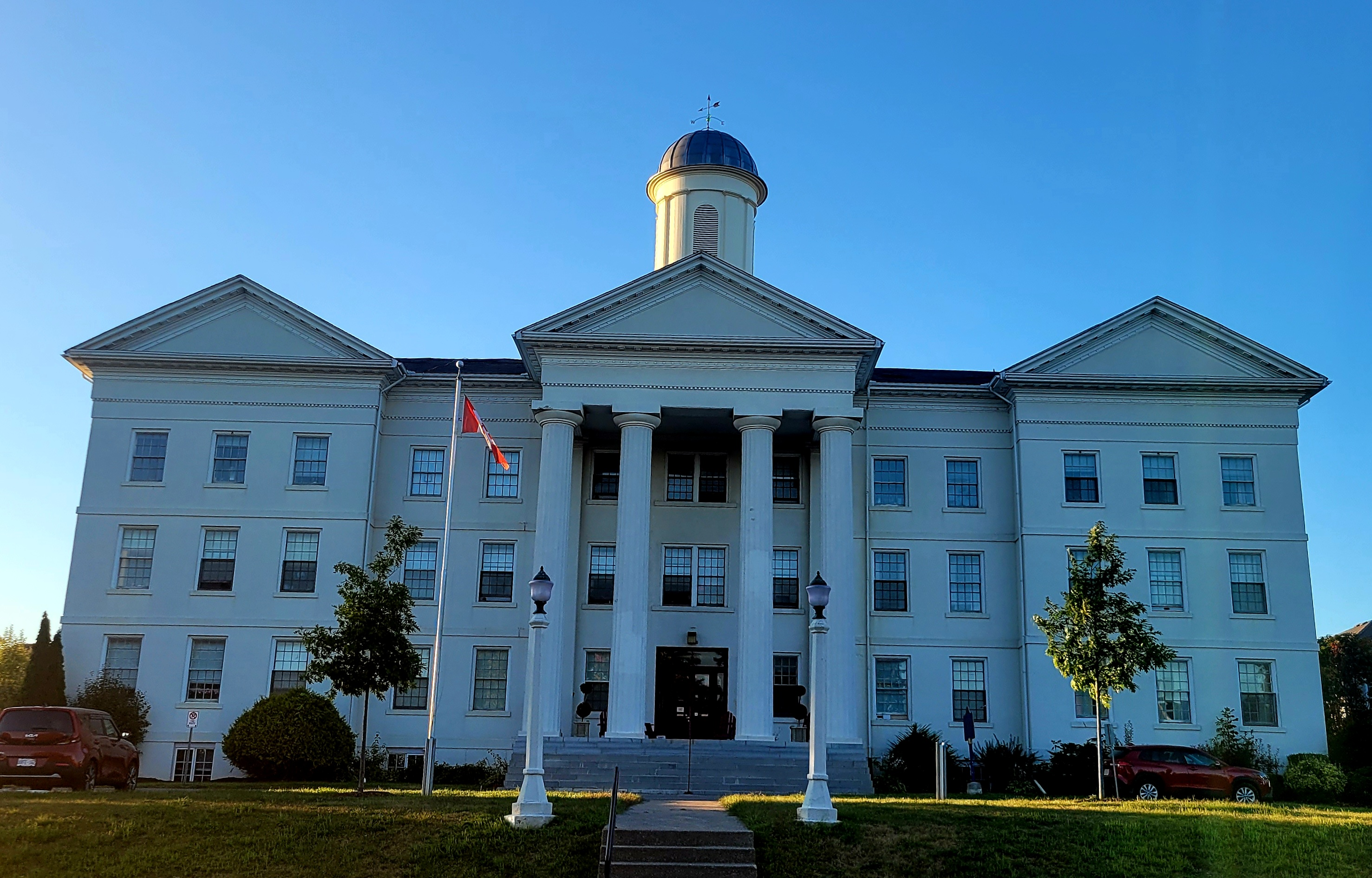
Old Victoria College, c. 1836-Cobourg-Ontario by Edward Crane

By the 1830s, Cobourg had become a regional centre, mostly due to its fine harbour on Lake Ontario. In 1835 the Upper Canada Academy was established in Cobourg by Egerton Ryerson and the Wesleyan Conference of Bishops. On 1 July 1837, Cobourg was officially incorporated as a town. In 1841 the Upper Canada Academy's name was changed to Victoria College. In 1842 Victoria College was granted powers to confer degrees. Victoria College remained in Cobourg until 1892, when it was moved to Toronto and federated with the University of Toronto. The old Victoria College building was repurposed several times (Cobourg insane Asylum 1900-1910s, Cobourg Military Convalescent Hospital to 1920, Ontario Hospital D’Arcy Place 1920-to 1970s) and now as a retirement home. In 1842 John Strachan founded the Diocesan Theological Institute in Cobourg, an Anglican seminary that became integrated into the University of Trinity College in Toronto in 1852.

=== Railway to Rice Lake ===
The timber and other resources of Cobourg's large hinterland were identified as the key to its prosperity, and if they could be brought to the harbour, Lake Ontario opened up a large and prosperous market. Peterborough to the north, founded in 1825 by Peter Robinson, had become the principal source area, and in the 1830s the waterways were still the prime method of bulk transport. Rice Lake and the Otonabee River were brought into use when James Gray Bethune established a steamer running across the lake and up the Otonabee which was navigable through to Peterborough. This meant goods and passengers could be brought at least to the south shore of Rice Lake. The remaining 8 miles of rough tracks was viable for passengers and light goods, but no use for the valuable timber and mine products. By 1835, only 10 years after the first steam railway in the world, there was active discussion about building a railway up to what later became Harwood. However, the townspeople invested instead in a plank road, using 300,000 feet of 3-inch wooden planks, allowing horse-drawn vehicles to haul heavy goods. By 1850 the plank road was breaking up, and was impassible in wet conditions, so the railway scheme was revived.

By 1852, there was considerable enthusiasm for the railway project within the town. River traffic had become seen as yesterday's solution by this time, so the plans were expanded to include a 4 kilometres (2.5 miles) long bridge across Rice Lake, to take the railway right up to Peterborough. By 1854 the rails reached the shore of the lake, and it found good work transporting passengers and nearly 2 million feet of lumber from the Rice Lake down to Cobourg that summer. However, revenue from the project had to be diverted into building an ill-fated bridge, using hundreds of wooden trestles, 31 Burr Truss spans, and a centre-pivot swing bridge to allow boats to pass. The prime mover locally for getting the Railway company off the ground was D'Arcy E. Boulton, a lawyer based in Cobourg, who enthused the town with the plan. They agreed to begin funding the scheme that was initially expected to cost £150,000, but ended leaving many people with worthless railway bonds and the town council with a debt that was only finally repaid in the 1930s. The man appointed to manage the project was Samuel Zimmerman, who had previously been instrumental in building the Great Western Railway (Ontario). The bridge was constructed over the summer of 1854 and was officially opened on 29 December that year. Three days later, it collapsed when ice movements shifted the trestles out of line, splintering the Burr Truss sections. The proposed solution was to stabilise the trestles (or 'stilts' as their critics dubbed them) by an infill of soil, which did happen on the southern side, still visible as a strip of land still remaining running into the lake near Harwood. But funds were not forthcoming for the northern side, and winter ice and shifting lake mud meant that it was frequently unusable.

A further problem emerged when Port Hope, not far along the coast, pursued its own plans for a railway to Peterborough. In 1857, the Port Hope and Lindsay line was constructed, and the following year opened a branch to Peterborough, going round the western end of the lake, in direct competition with the struggling Cobourg route. The response of the Cobourg directors was to oust D. E. Boulton, who then invested in the Port Hope line. Conflicts of interest among various personnel resulted in the deliberate removal of the bolts on sections of the bridge in early 1861, ensuring that when the ice moved again the bridge was destroyed, and this time it was left unrepaired. The railway reverted to linking Cobourg harbour with Harwood and the Rice Lake water traffic.

In 1865, the railway was bought by a consortium of Pittsburgh steel manufacturers, who had already bought the Marmora Iron quarries north-east of Rice Lake. They established an iron-ore supply route using barges up the Trent River and across Rice Lake to the railway at Harwood. From there it was brought along the Railway to Cobourg Harbour for shipment across Lake Ontario to feed the steel mills of America. This provided a steady income for the railway and the town until the ore ran out in 1878. It also had two longer term spin-offs in the form of a rail car company and the beginnings of a tourist industry.

==== Crossen Car Works ====
When the iron ore scheme was getting underway, a small iron foundry based in Cobourg, was approached to cast the wheels and frames of wagons to move the Marmora iron ore down to the harbour. James Crossen saw an opportunity to combine his cast-iron products with the abundant local timber to produce railway rolling stock. With the foundry located near both the Cobourg line and train station of the Grand Trunk Railway, which had been built along the shore of Lake Ontario in 1856, it was well placed to expand as Canada's railway network grew. It was later named the Crossen Car Manufacturing Company and went on to become the largest builder of timber-framed rail cars in Canada, making everything from coal and freight wagons through to dining cars and first-class carriages. By 1910, wood was going out of date, when all-steel cars took over, and in 1915 the company, unable to adapt, went into liquidation, and parts of the site reverted to being an iron foundry. A replica of one of the Crossen ore cars was built in 2016 and is on display near Cobourg waterfront.

==== Wealthy Americans ====
The connections and trade links which developed through the iron shipments brought many American industrialists to Cobourg, which became a popular summer destination. High class hotels were established, followed in the late 19th century and early 20th century by enormous summer homes for wealthy Americans, a few of which still stand today. One notable home, on King Street East, later became the Brookside School, a youth detention centre. (It has now closed, and the property stands idle.) A major ferry service connected Cobourg and Rochester, New York from 1907 to 1952, transporting passengers and cargo across Lake Ontario, allowing Americans to reach the town more readily.

=== Victoria Hall ===
For a brief moment in 1856, the town, with both its new railway link to the interior and an east–west rail connection along the Grand Trunk Railway, was feeling secure in its future prosperity, and thought a new Town Hall would encourage further investment and be an asset to the area. Victoria Hall stands at the heart of the downtown, a building that now serves as the town hall, as well as home of the Art Gallery of Northumberland, the Cobourg Concert Hall, and an Old Bailey-style courtroom that is now used as the Council chamber. Victoria Hall was designed by architect Kivas Tully. The landmark is known for its impressive stone work. Charles Thomas Thomas (1820-1867), an English-born master stonecarver and building contractor, executed the fine stone carvings, including the bearded faced keystone over the main entrance into the building. Victoria Hall was officially opened on September 6, 1860 by the Prince of Wales, later to become King Edward VII. At that time, Cobourg was a significant town in the Province of Canada, and some townspeople felt that Cobourg would be a suitable capital for the newly united provinces; this privilege went to Ottawa, Ontario, however.

=== Heritage Centre ===
One of the oldest buildings in the town was for many years known as The Barracks, suggesting military connections. However it is equally likely that it was built for industrial uses, either in the very early 1800s or as a malting house and brewery by James Calcutt in the early 1830s. It probably served that purpose until a larger brewery was built by the McKechnies in 1863. The old stone-built building had a variety of industrial and storage purposes, and twenty different owners. In 2000 it was acquired in a run-down state by the Cobourg Museum Foundation, who have restored it and it is now open as the Sifton-Cook Heritage Centre.

=== Cobourg Jail ===
In 1906 on 77 Albert Street the Cobourg Jail, originally referred to as The County Jail, began to house inmates. Over time the Cobourg jail continued to expand to house the increasing population of inmates. In 1998 the jail closed and the year after in 1999 was purchased by private buyers. The jail has since been converted to a tourist attraction called the King George Inn with the jail still intact to see or stay in. Additionally, a family restaurant was implemented for guests and non-guests of the hotel.

=== Crash landing ===
On 20 December 1951, Cobourg experienced media attention as a chartered Curtiss C-46 Commando airplane, bound for Newark, New Jersey, made an emergency landing in local farmer Charles Wilson's field, alongside Highway 2 and Roger's Road. The pilot had lost his way after losing radio contact, and unwittingly drifted north. The 44 passengers and three crew escaped unhurt, but extremely cold in the sub-zero temperatures. The plane, having crash landed on deep snow, was able to be repaired and the field smoothed out enough for it to get airborne again.

Cobourg was the site of No. 26 Ordnance Depot, later Canadian Forces Station Cobourg, from 1953 to 1971.

=== Regeneration ===
Throughout the late 1980s and early 1990s, the town invested heavily in purchasing property along the waterfront and beautifying the area. A boardwalk was developed to connect the harbour and large sandy beach while further pathways were created to encompass Victoria Park and the historic downtown. Because of this renewal and revitalization, many community activities now revolve in and around these spaces.

== Climate ==
Cobourg has a humid continental climate (Dfb) with warm summers and cold winters.

Climate data for Cobourg (1991−2020 normals, extremes 1955–present)
Month	Jan	Feb	Mar	Apr	May	Jun	Jul	Aug	Sep	Oct	Nov	Dec	Year
Record high °C (°F)	13.0 (55.4)	14.4 (57.9)	20.0 (68.0)	26.0 (78.8)	29.0 (84.2)	33.3 (91.9)	36.0 (96.8)	34.0 (93.2)	31.1 (88.0)	24.4 (75.9)	20.6 (69.1)	15.5 (59.9)	36.0 (96.8)
Mean daily maximum °C (°F)	−1.1 (30.0)	−0.4 (31.3)	3.4 (38.1)	9.6 (49.3)	15.4 (59.7)	20.4 (68.7)	23.6 (74.5)	23.6 (74.5)	20.4 (68.7)	13.3 (55.9)	7.2 (45.0)	1.8 (35.2)	11.4 (52.5)
Daily mean °C (°F)	−4.9 (23.2)	−4.3 (24.3)	−0.3 (31.5)	5.8 (42.4)	11.4 (52.5)	16.4 (61.5)	19.8 (67.6)	19.7 (67.5)	16.3 (61.3)	9.6 (49.3)	3.8 (38.8)	−1.5 (29.3)	7.7 (45.9)
Mean daily minimum °C (°F)	−8.7 (16.3)	−8.1 (17.4)	−3.9 (25.0)	2.0 (35.6)	7.4 (45.3)	12.4 (54.3)	15.9 (60.6)	15.8 (60.4)	12.2 (54.0)	6.0 (42.8)	0.3 (32.5)	−4.8 (23.4)	3.9 (39.0)
Record low °C (°F)	−39.0 (−38.2)	−27.8 (−18.0)	−26.0 (−14.8)	−13.9 (7.0)	−5.0 (23.0)	−1.0 (30.2)	5.0 (41.0)	1.0 (33.8)	−5.0 (23.0)	−10.0 (14.0)	−17.2 (1.0)	−29.0 (−20.2)	−39.0 (−38.2)
Average precipitation mm (inches)	66.7 (2.63)	54.1 (2.13)	56.8 (2.24)	76.2 (3.00)	81.2 (3.20)	80.5 (3.17)	64.8 (2.55)	71.7 (2.82)	93.2 (3.67)	76.3 (3.00)	93.2 (3.67)	75.8 (2.98)	890.4 (35.06)
Average rainfall mm (inches)	34.0 (1.34)	32.9 (1.30)	42.7 (1.68)	74.3 (2.93)	81.2 (3.20)	80.5 (3.17)	64.8 (2.55)	71.7 (2.82)	93.2 (3.67)	76.3 (3.00)	89.2 (3.51)	53.1 (2.09)	793.9 (31.26)
Average snowfall cm (inches)	32.7 (12.9)	21.2 (8.3)	14.2 (5.6)	1.8 (0.7)	0.0 (0.0)	0.0 (0.0)	0.0 (0.0)	0.0 (0.0)	0.0 (0.0)	0.0 (0.0)	4.0 (1.6)	22.7 (8.9)	96.5 (38.0)
Average precipitation days (≥ 0.2 mm)	11.2	8.3	9.3	11.2	10.9	9.8	8.5	10.0	10.0	11.6	12.1	10.8	123.6
Average rainy days (≥ 0.2 mm)	4.6	4.2	6.5	10.7	10.9	9.8	8.5	10.0	10.0	11.6	11.3	6.6	104.8
Average snowy days (≥ 0.2 cm)	7.0	4.6	3.4	0.65	0.0	0.0	0.0	0.0	0.0	0.0	0.92	4.6	21.2
Source: Environment Canada (precipitation/rainfall/snow 1981–2010)

== Transportation ==
Highway 401 and Northumberland County Road 2 (formerly Highway 2) pass through town. County Road 45 (formerly Highway 45) begins in Cobourg and heads north-east to Norwood.

The Canadian Pacific and Canadian National main railway lines (Toronto – Ottawa/Montreal) traverse the town. Via Rail offers passenger service to Cobourg railway station with multiple daily departures on the Toronto – Ottawa/Montreal route.

Cobourg Transit is a fully accessible community transit system that provides daily bus service to the town. The community transit system ends its runs by 7pm, which can hamper travel for those without other means of transportation. It formerly ran until 9:30pm however the hours were reduced.

The Ontario Waterfront Trail passes through Cobourg and cyclists can be found moving through daily during the warmer months.

== Demographics ==
Historical populations
Year	Pop.	±%
1841	3,347	—
1871	4,442	+32.7%
1881	4,957	+11.6%
1891	4,829	−2.6%
1901	4,239	−12.2%
1911	5,074	+19.7%
1921	5,327	+5.0%
1931	5,834	+9.5%
1941	5,907	+1.3%
1951	7,470	+26.5%
1961	10,646	+42.5%
1971	11,282	+6.0%
1981	11,385	+0.9%
1991	15,079	+32.4%
1996	16,185	+7.3%
2001	17,172	+6.1%
2006	18,210	+6.0%
2011	18,519	+1.7%
2016	19,440	+5.0%
2021	20,519	+5.6%

In the 2021 Census of Population conducted by Statistics Canada, Cobourg had a population of 20,519 living in 9,134 of its 9,520 total private dwellings, a change of 5.6% from its 2016 population of 19,440. With a land area of 22.41 km^{2} (8.65 sq mi), it had a population density of 915.6/km^{2} (2,371.4/sq mi) in 2021.

Canada census – Cobourg community profile

	2021	2016	2011
Population	20,519 (+5.6% from 2016)	19,440 (+5.0% from 2011)	18.519 (+1.7% from 2006)
Land area	22.41 km^{2} (8.65 sq mi)	22.36 km^{2} (8.63 sq mi)	22.37 km^{2} (8.64 sq mi)
Population density	915.7/km^{2} (2,372/sq mi)	869.3/km^{2} (2,251/sq mi)	827.8/km^{2} (2,144/sq mi)
Median age	54.8 (M: 51.2, F: 56.8)	53.5 (M: 51.5, F: 55.1)	49.6 (M: 47.7, F: 51.3)
Private dwellings	9,520 (total) 9,134 (occupied)	8,958 (total)	8,541 (total) 8,047 (occupied)
Median household income	$77,000	$64,328	$$57,371

References: 2021 2016 2011

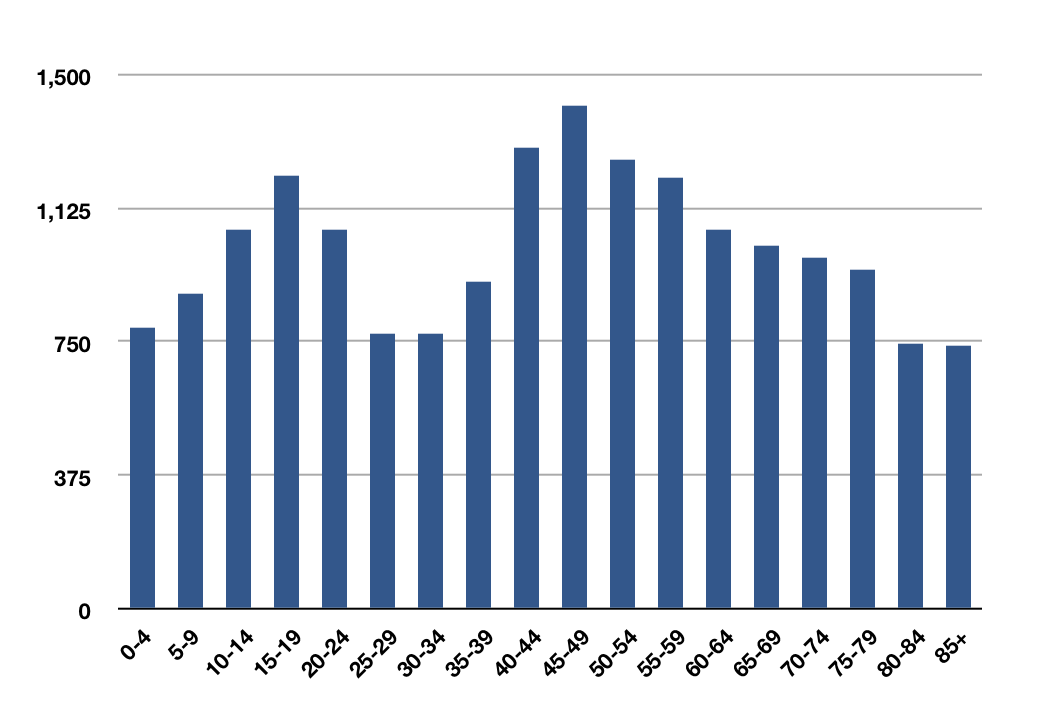
Age distribution in Cobourg according to the 2006 census.

Age Profile

- Age 0-14: 18.1%
- Age 15-24: 11.9%
- Age 25-44: 24.7%
- Age 45-64: 24.2%
- Age 65-74: 10.8%
- Age 75+: 10.3%

Religious Make Up

- 56.1% Protestant
- 23.9% Catholic
- 2.2% other Christian
- 0.7% other religions
- 17.1% non-professing

Racial Profile

- 91.4% White
- 4.4% Indigenous
- 3.8% Korean
- 0.7% Black

== Government ==
The Town of Cobourg is governed by a seven-member town council. The Town is responsible for delivering a variety of local services, including planning, transit, fire and police protection, and the maintenance of local roads and parks. Certain responsibilities, such as waste management or paramedic services, are the responsibility of Northumberland County.

There are six advisory committees appointed by the city council. These bodies are made up of city councillors.

- Accessibility Advisory Committee - effective 2023
- Civic Awards Advisory Committee - to re-convene in 2024
- Cobourg Heritage Advisory Committee - effective 2023
- Cobourg Police Service Board - effective 2023
- Cobourg Public Library Board - effective 2023
- Committee of Adjustment - effective 2023

Previous bodies include:

- Equity, Diversity and Inclusion Committee - no longer active
- Parks and Recreation Advisory Committee - no longer active
- Planning and Development Advisory Committee - no longer active
- Sustainability and Climate Change Emergency Advisory Committee - no longer active
- Transportation Advisory Committee, Zero Emission Ad Hoc Committee (on hold)

The Town maintains an independent municipal police force, the Cobourg Police Service, which provides policing services to all areas of the municipality as well as seasonal by-law enforcement services in the neighbouring Township of Hamilton.

The Town of Cobourg had an approved operating budget of CA$28.1 million in 2023 and a capital budget plan of CA$33 million. The town's revenues include subsidies from the Government of Canada and the Government of Ontario (for programs mandated by those governments). The town's largest operating expenditure is the Harbour Rehabilitation project costing nearly CA$23 million in 2023.

== Education ==
Public education in Cobourg is under the management of the Kawartha Pine Ridge District School Board, and Catholic education is by the Peterborough Victoria Northumberland and Clarington Catholic District School Board.

Cobourg also has a satellite campus of Fleming College.

In 1871, Cobourg's first Collegiate Institute was erected on King Street East. In 1899, the student population at the original Cobourg Collegiate Institute had outgrown the school. New plans for another school on the west end of King Street were put in place and the new school building on 135 King Street was built. This new building was called the West high school and the older school building was then named the East high school. The West high school had many additions in the 1920s as the school continued to grow. The two schools co-existed for 116 years until the closing of both schools in 2015. The purpose of closing the two schools was to bring them back together with the fabrication of a brand new Cobourg Collegiate Institute in 2015. The new school was built on the property of the old east high school. The old west high school was not demolished, but renamed William Academy Cobourg West and is a functioning co-ed private school for grades 7-12.

== Attractions ==
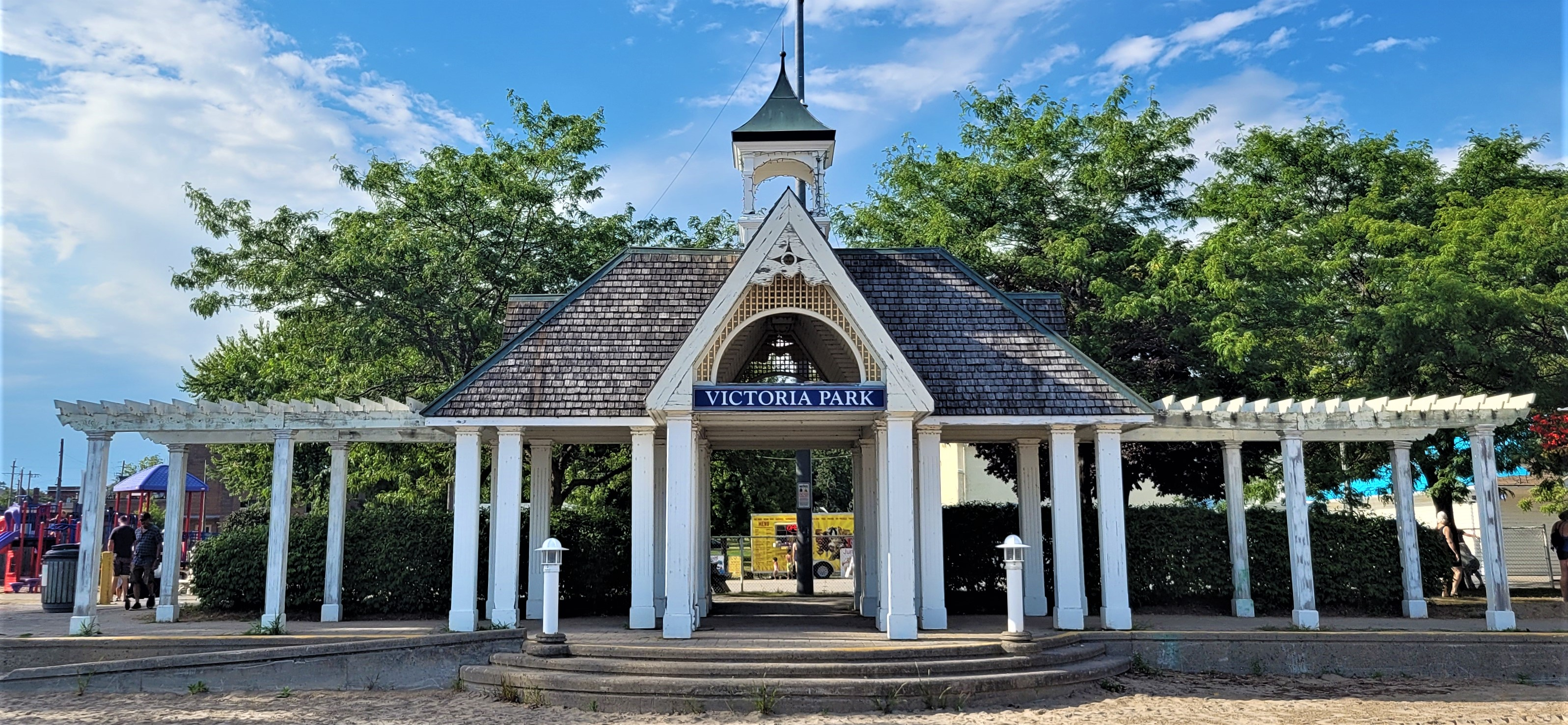
Victoria Park

Cobourg retains its small-town atmosphere, in part due to the downtown and surrounding residential area's status as a Heritage Conservation District. The downtown is a well-preserved example of a traditional small-town main street. Victoria Hall, the town hall completed in 1860, is a National Historic Site of Canada. The oldest building in the town is now open as the Sifton Cook Heritage Centre and operated by the Cobourg Museum Foundation.

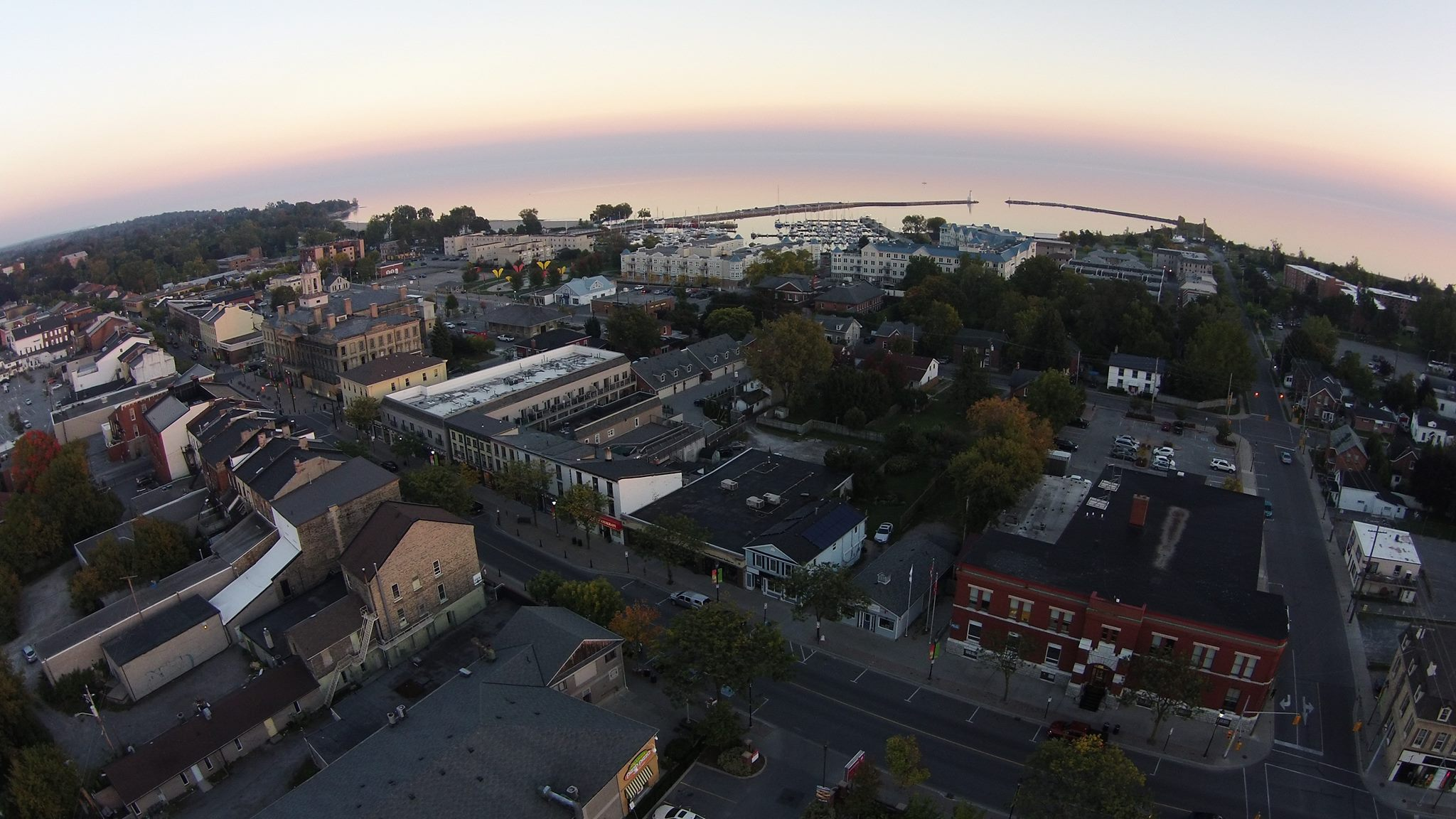
Downtown Cobourg, Ontario, Canada. Aerial View taken from a DJI Phantom Vision

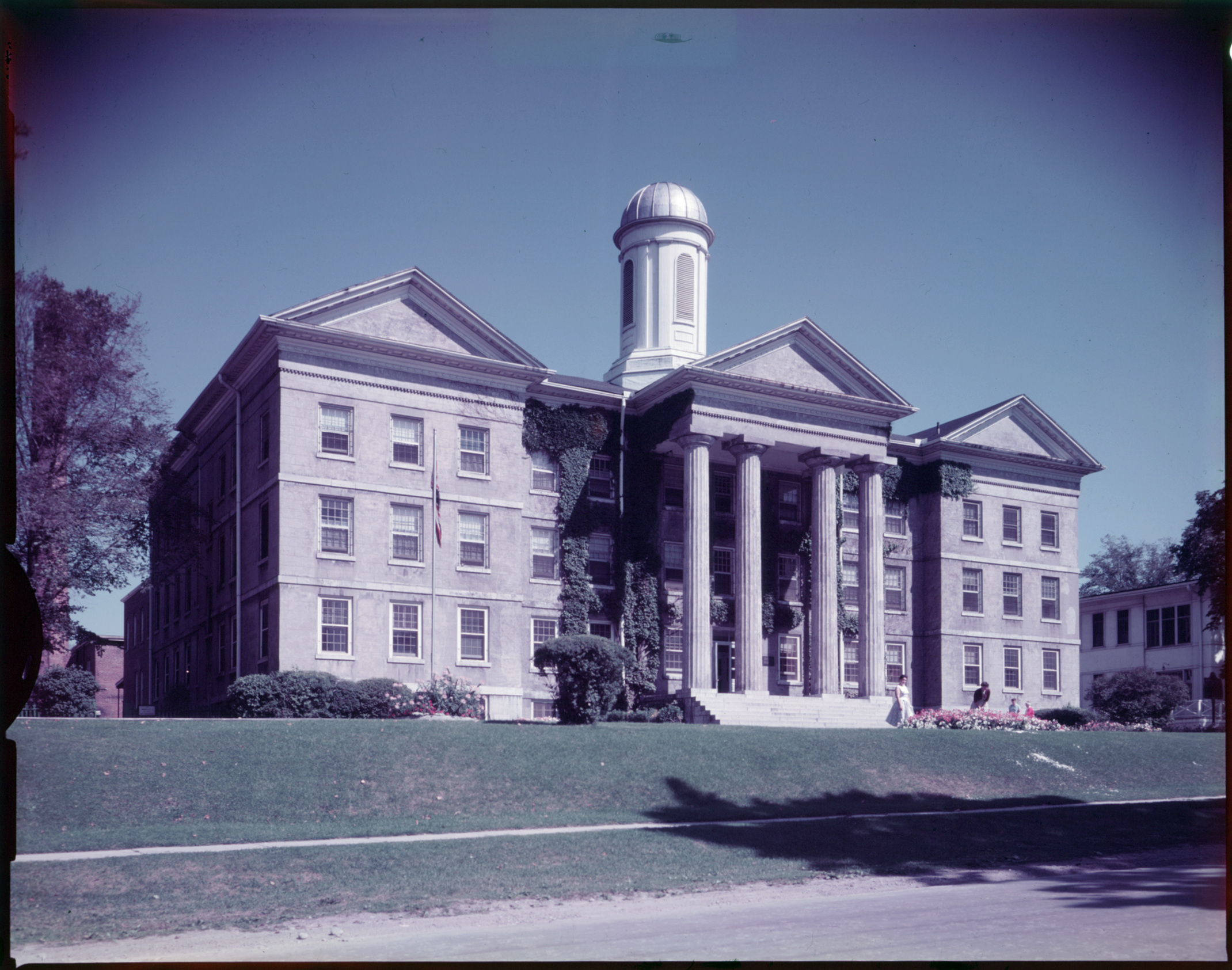
Victoria College c. 1832-1836

Cobourg has several parks. The Cobourg Waterfront Festival, held in Victoria Park and the nearby beach and harbour, is an annual arts and crafts event occurring on Canada Day. It began in 1987 as part of the town's sesquicentennial celebrations, and was conceived by the Art Gallery of Northumberland's former Director/Curator Peter Tulumello and former Concert Hall Manager Mark Finnan. Cobourg's oldest annual event, the Cobourg Highland Games, was started in 1963 in Donegan Park by Dave Carr to celebrate the Scottish culture in the area. The event is now held in Victoria Park in June.

Cobourg's beach, Victoria Park Beach, is used as a location for volleyball tournaments, events, beach days, family picnics and other events. The beach is equipped with a splash park, playground set, park area for eating, local restaurants and a pier. Additionally, there is a small trailer park located directly next to the beach. There are lifeguards on duty some days and it is safe to swim and play in. Close to the downtown, tourists can shop in local shops and eat out at many of Cobourg's restaurants.

Cobourg was home to the Port Hope Drive-In, Canada's oldest drive-in, until it closed in 2023.

== Media ==
=== Print ===
- Northumberland Today, owned by Osprey Media, is a daily newspaper with content contributed from the Cobourg Star and Port Hope Guide.

=== Radio ===
Five radio stations are licensed to Cobourg, providing music, news and local programming to Northumberland County and surrounding areas.

- FM 89.7 - CFWN, not-for-profit community-based, volunteer driven, programming focused on the community
- FM 90.7 - CHJJ, Christian music
- FM 93.3 - CKSG, adult contemporary
- FM 103.1 - CFMZ, classical
- FM 107.9 - CHUC, classic hits

=== TV ===
Cobourg uses cable 10 to broadcast local events and weather. Apart from that, Cobourg has no local terrestrial television stations; the closest is CHEX-TV in Peterborough, Ontario.

== Notable people ==
- John Douglas Armour, Puisne judge of the Supreme Court of Canada
- Ada Blenkhorn, hymn writer who wrote "Keep on the Sunny Side" and "Let the Sunshine In"
- Charles Arkoll Boulton, militia leader in the Red River Rebellion
- Fern Blodgett Sunde, first Canadian woman to serve with the merchant marines during the Second World War
- Alan Bradley, author
- Jeremiah Brown, Canadian Men's Eight Rowing Team, won silver at the 2012 London Olympic Games
- Mandy Bujold, Canadian boxer
- James Cockburn, lawyer and Father of Confederation
- cleopatrick, rock band
- Martin Dobkin, first mayor of the City of Mississauga, Ontario and served as Mayor from 1973 to 1976.
- Marie Dressler, silent film actress, Academy Award winner best actress 1931
- Francis P. Duffy, Canadian-born military chaplain of the Fighting 69th New York Regiment during WWI
- Sandford Fleming who helped create and define the idea of time zones
- Mason Flesch, rugby player
- Rev. John Weir Foote, politician, chaplain, and Victoria Cross recipient
- Ed Greenwood, author of the Forgotten Realms setting for Dungeons & Dragons
- W. A. Hewitt, sports executive and journalist, Hockey Hall of Fame inductee
- Paul Kane, Irish-born Canadian painter
- Henry Bowyer Lane, English born Toronto architect
- John Murray (1841–1914), pioneering oceanographer, marine biologist and limnologist. Considered the father of modern oceanography.
- Ebenezer Perry (1788–1876), politician and Cobourg's first police commissioner
- Josh Richards, internet personality, musician and actor
- William Renwick Riddell, judge and historian
- Dave "Goldie Rogers" Sherwin, professional wrestler
- Virna Sheard, poet and novelist
- Steve Smith, NHL hockey player
- Harvey Sproule, NHL club part owner, NHL St. Patrick’s Head Coach, OHA and NHL referee
- Justin Williams, NHL hockey player, 3-time Stanley Cup champion, winner of 2014 Conn Smythe Trophy

== Twin towns – sister cities ==
Cobourg is twinned with:

- Coburg, Germany

== See also ==
- Coburg, Indiana - named after Cobourg, Ontario
- Royal eponyms in Canada
