= Fern Blodgett Sunde =

First female wireless radio operator at sea

- Born: Fern Alberta Blodgett; July 6, 1918; Regina, Saskatchewan, Canada
- Died: September 19, 1991 (aged 73); Farsund, Norway
- Spouse: Gerner Sunde (m. 1942; died 1962)
- Military career
- Allegiance: United Kingdom
- Branch: British merchant marine
- Rank: Chief wireless operator
- Conflicts: Second World War
- Awards: Norwegian War Medal

Fern Alberta Blodgett Sunde (née Blodgett; July 6, 1918 – September 19, 1991) was a Canadian wireless radio operator who served on board the M/S Mosdale, a Norwegian merchant vessel, during the Battle of the Atlantic. She was the first Canadian woman to earn a second-class wireless operator's certificate, the first Canadian woman to serve with the merchant marine during the Second World War, and the first woman to serve as a wireless radio operator at sea. In 1943, she was awarded the Norwegian War Medal, the first woman to receive the decoration.

== Early life and education ==
Sunde was born July 6, 1918 in Regina, Saskatchewan. When she was six months old, her family moved to Cobourg, Ontario. Growing up, she would often watch the steamships navigating Lake Ontario and later described how she dreamed of becoming a sailor.

In 1936, Sunde began training as a nurse, but she abandoned it after 14 months. Instead, she moved to Toronto and enrolled in a business school. She completed her studies in 1939 and found work as a stenographer at an insurance company.

== Career ==
=== Training ===
When the Second World War broke out in September 1939, Sunde learned that there was a shortage of ocean-going wireless operators and saw an opportunity to work at sea and decided to train to be a radio operator. She was initially rejected by two schools and later recalled in an interview how "[The two schools] said they had never had a woman student and they didn't intend to start now." She was later accepted by a third school in Toronto, the Radio College of Canada, which had started a course for women in light of the shortage of wireless operators brought about by the war. The class consisted of just Sunde and another woman, who dropped out after the first week. She completed her training after 18 months of night school, three nights per week, while continuing full-time work as a stenographer during the day. She completed the course on June 13, 1941, becoming the first Canadian woman to earn a second-class wireless operator's certificate.

=== M/S Mosdale ===
On June 13, 1941, the day she completed the course, Sunde received a phone call from her principal, who knew of her desire to serve at sea, informing her that a British-controlled Norwegian merchant vessel, the M/S Mosdale, was docked in Montreal and urgently needed a radio operator. She caught a train to Montreal that evening. Women were prohibited from serving on board Canadian and British ships, but Norway had no such restrictions. The captain, Gerner Sunde (1911-1962), had not realized that Sunde, who had applied as "F. Blodgett", was a woman. However, he could not delay his departure any further and accepted her for the position, making her the first woman to serve as a seaborne wireless radio operator, or sparks (a colloquialism derived from the spark-gap transmitters used at the time). Sunde's salary was $170 per month plus board.

In 1940 Nazi Germany had invaded Norway and ordered Norway's merchant fleet – most of which had been at sea during the invasion – to return to German-controlled waters. However, the crews ignored the orders and instead joined the Allied war effort as the Norwegian Shipping and Trade Mission (Nortraship) and transported provisions across the Atlantic Ocean to the United Kingdom. Consequently, Norwegian ships were considered prize targets by the German Kriegsmarine and Norway had lost more than half its fleet by the end of the war.

The Mosdale was a 3,000-ton fruit carrier with a crew of 35 and occasionally up to 12 passengers, including correspondents, service members, rescued sailors from ships that had been torpedoed, and, on one occasion, an African explorer. Launched in 1939, just a month before the war began, the ship was relatively new. Its modern design gave it a top speed of 15 knots, and it often travelled alone since it could outrun German U-boats.

=== Early years of the war ===
Sunde's duties consisted primarily of listening for coded messages, which were received in various combinations of short, medium, and long waves and sent using encoding formats that changed with each crossing. Accuracy was essential, as the crew faced the constant threat of storms, enemy U-boats, bomber attacks, and uncharted minefields. Sunde seldom transmitted messages while at sea since the signals could be triangulated, giving away the ship's position. Instead, transmissions were reserved for emergencies, which often meant that the ship had already been located by the enemy.

Sunde faced a number of obstacles. She worked in cramped quarters and could not read the equipment instructions, which were written in Norwegian, in an environment where a single mistake could mean disaster for the ship. Sunde was also prone to extreme seasickness. Nevertheless, she continued her duties with a bucket by her side. She quickly won the respect of the rest of the crew and noted in an interview how they treated her like any other crew member. When asked by a reporter if she would consider leaving her post and settling down, she replied, "Not yet. Until Germany is licked, I belong right here."

At first Sunde was the ship's only wireless operator. By the end of 1942, however, the Battle of the Atlantic had greatly intensified. Until that point, transmissions from the Admiralty were broadcast only at certain times of day. However, regulations were changed and Allied ships were ordered to keep radio watch 24 hours a day. To accommodate the extra workload, two additional radio operators were added to the crew.

The Mosdale was never torpedoed during the war, though there were several close calls. During one crossing, a U-boat surfaced just off the ship's starboard bow, making Sunde the first woman to transmit the position of an enemy submarine. In early 1943, the Mosdale was attacked by a German plane, which fired on the ship with its machine gun. However, Sunde had decoded an earlier warning message from a nearby ship, giving the crew ample time to ready its anti-aircraft gun. The plane was forced to withdraw without damaging the ship.

In July 1942, a year after they had met, Sunde and Captain Sunde were married during a brief layover in Saint John, New Brunswick. Sunde moved into the captain's quarters, which became their first shared home.

=== Later years of the war ===
On July 15, 1943, following the Mosdale's fifty-first Atlantic Crossing, the ship's crew received a visit from Norway's King Haakon VII and his son, Crown Prince Olav, while the ship was docked at Cardiff. The king had been in exile in London and visited Norwegian ships throughout the war. He presented five members of the crew with medals, including Sunde, who received the Norwegian War Medal, making her the first woman to receive the decoration.

The Mosdale crossed the Atlantic 96 times throughout the war, more than any other Allied vessel, delivering badly needed supplies to England. Sunde handled radio communications on 78 of those voyages. Not one of the Mosdale's five sister ships survived the war. Sunde and her husband continued to serve on board the Mosdale for six months after the war ended. In March 1946, the ship returned to Norway for the first time in more than five years. It sailed into Oslo to the cheers of thousands of onlookers, who had turned up not to celebrate the ship and its legacy but rather its shipment of bananas, the first bananas to reach Norway since the beginning of the war.

Sunde continued to serve as a sparks off and on until 1952.

== Later life and death ==
Sunde retired in 1952 and settled in Farsund, Norway – her husband's hometown – to start a family. Sunde and her husband had two daughters, Fern and Solveig Ann. In 1962, while at sea, Sunde's husband died suddenly of a heart attack at the age of 50, leaving her to raise their two daughters alone. She never remarried and spent the rest of her life in Norway. She died on September 19, 1991.

== Awards and legacy ==
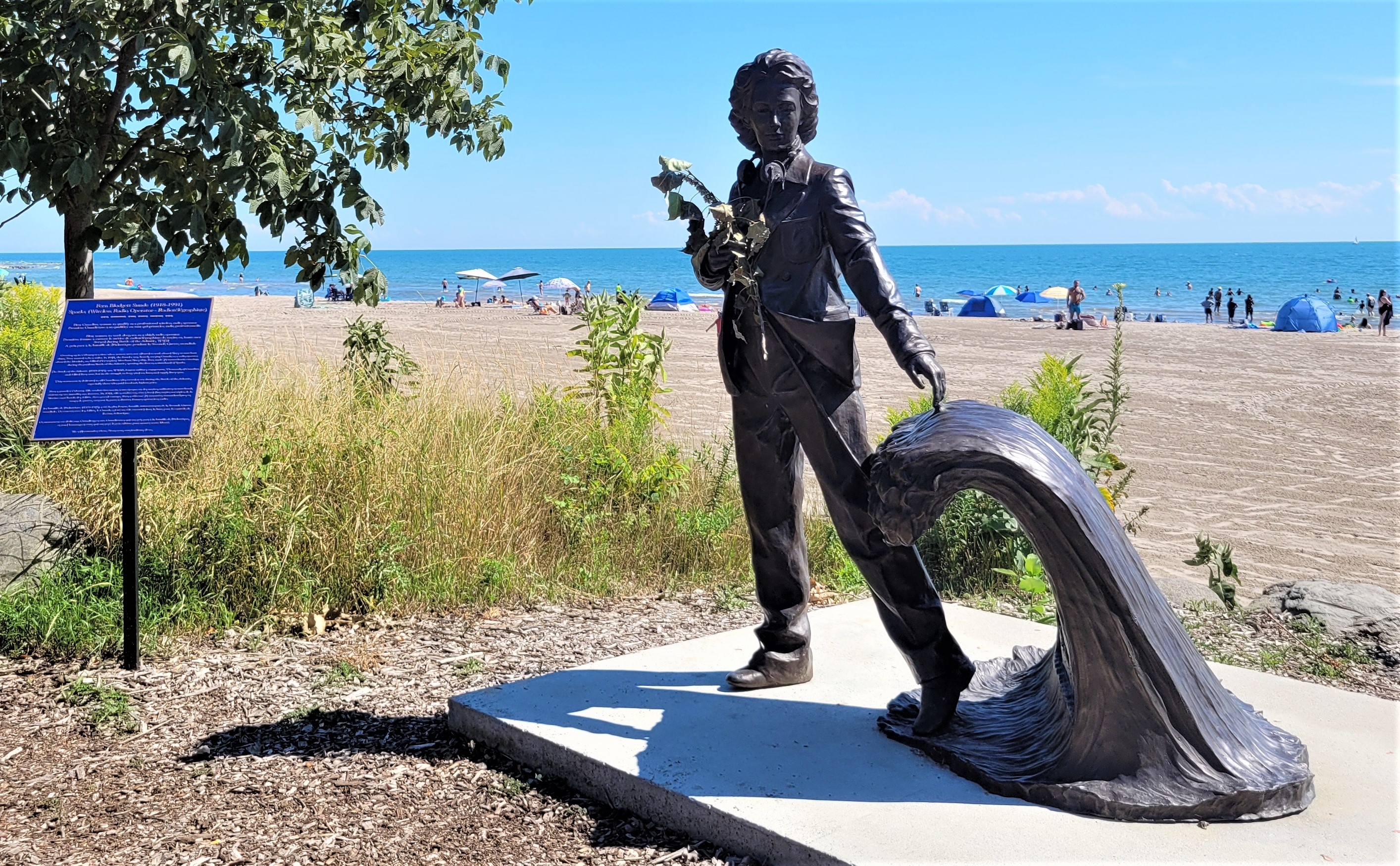
The Monument of Fern Blodgett Sunde at Victoria Park

Sunde had cleared the way for women to serve as sparks. In December 1943, four months after Sunde had been awarded the Norwegian War Medal, two more Canadian women joined the Norwegian merchant fleet as wireless operators. By the end of the war, 23 women – 21 Canadians and two Americans – had enlisted as sparks on board Norwegian ships.

In 1988, Sunde received a medal from the city of Farsund for her efforts during the war.

The Cobourg Museum Foundation commissioned a life-sized bronze statue of Sunde called Make Waves created by Tyler Fauvelle. The monument stands on a beach at Victoria Park in Cobourg overlooking Lake Ontario, the view that had inspired Sunde's fascination with ships nearly a century earlier. It was unveiled at a ceremony on October 17, 2020, while the crew of a Canadian Coast Guard vessel anchored nearby stood at attention. During the ceremony, Leona Woods, a Cobourg resident who had spearheaded the committee behind the monument, said in a speech:

Fern was a Cobourg girl whose story is of national and international importance. She connects Canada with her ally Norway. She represents the veterans who participated in the Battle of the Atlantic. She speaks to the need for us to continue working for gender equality and respect for all people in our society.

In May 2025, a duplicate of the memorial statue was unveiled in Farsund.
