= Roswell Gardinier Benedict =

- Born: December 9, 1815 possibly Saratoga Springs, New York
- Died: February 5, 1859 (aged 43); New York City
- Engineering career
- Discipline: Civil engineering
- Projects: Second Welland Canal

Roswell Gardinier Benedict (9 December 1815 – 5 February 1859) was a civil engineer. In his career in both Canada and the United States, he worked on numerous American and Canadian railway projects, as well as the construction of the Second Welland Canal. Ultimately, he came to serve as the chief engineer on the Great Western Railway of Canada. He was notable for his association with Samuel Zimmerman, construction contractor for the railway, with whom he had worked on the Welland Canal. Together and with others, they formed part of a tight-knit group of American engineers and contractors who exerted a strong degree of operational control over the Great Western after supplanting the original Hamilton-based promoter of the railway, Sir Allan MacNab, who was a rival of Zimmerman.

== Biography ==
Benedict was born on December 9, 1815, possibly in Saratoga Springs, New York, the son of Daniel Davis Benedict and Phoebe Hedges. He began his career as a civil engineer around 1833, working on railways in New York and Ohio.

Benedict's professional career was mainly spent in railway construction although his first significant project involved construction on the Welland Canal. He formed an association there with a contractor, Samuel Zimmerman, which would continue until Zimmerman's death in 1857.

Benedict had acquired extensive railway-building experience in the United States before coming to Canada. After his time on the Canal project, he became assistant to the chief engineer of the Great Western Railroad in 1847 and then chief engineer four years later.
