= Sydney Strickland Tully =

Canadian painter (1860–1911)

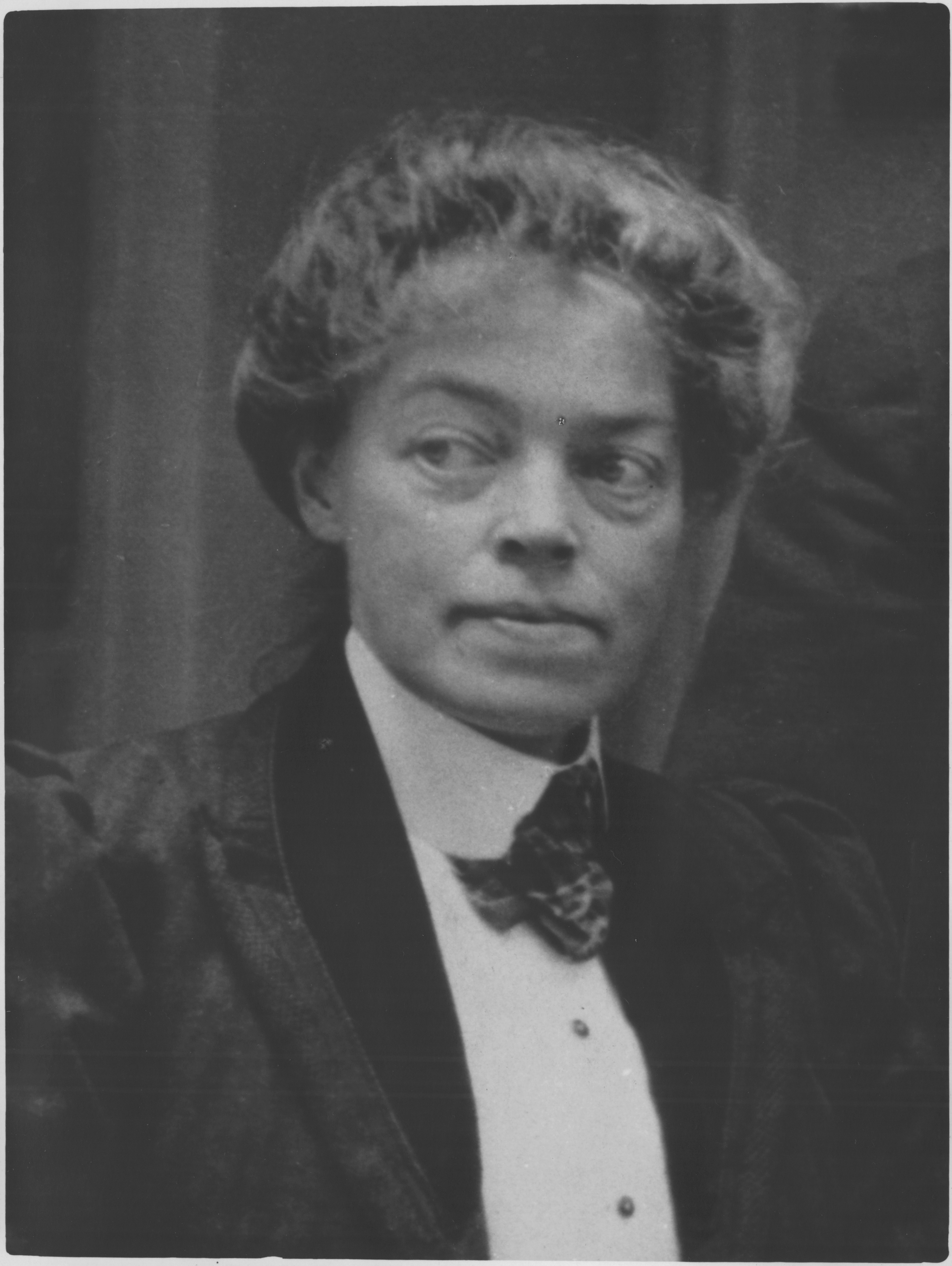
- Sydney Strickland Tully circa 1910
- Born: March 10, 1860; Toronto, Canada West
- Died: July 18, 1911 (aged 51); Toronto, Ontario, Canada
- Education: Académie Colarossi, Académie Julian, Slade School of Fine Art, Ontario School of Art
- Known for: painter
- Notable work: The Twilight of Life (1894)
- Elected: Ontario Society of Artists, Royal Canadian Academy of Arts

Sydney Strickland Tully RCA (March 10, 1860 – July 18, 1911) was a Canadian painter. She is known for her pastel and oil portraits, landscapes and genre pictures, and for her success in a number of exhibitions. Tully kept a studio in Toronto from 1888 until her death. Her major works include The Twilight of Life (1894), an oil painting in the collection of the Art Gallery of Ontario.

== Biography ==
Sydney Strickland Tully was born and raised in Toronto, the child of Maria Strickland and Kivas Tully. Maria Strickland was a niece of Susanna Moodie and Kivas Tully was a prominent architect. Tully's sister, Louise Beresford Tully, was also a Toronto-based artist who operated a Yonge Street Arcade-based teaching studio. Tully's early studies took place at the Central Ontario School of Art (later OCAD University), Toronto, with Charlotte Schreiber and William Cruikshank (amongst others). In 1884, she went to London to continue her education at the Slade School of Art, where she studied with Alphonse Legros. Further studies took place in Paris at the Académie Julian (with Jean-Joseph Benjamin-Constant and Tony Robert-Fleury) and the Académie Colarossi (with Gustave-Claude-Etienne Courtois). Later studies took place at the Long Island Art School with William Merritt Chase. Sydney Strickland Tully died on July 18, 1911, in Toronto, of pernicious anemia.

== Career ==
Tully began her career colouring photographs and designing Christmas cards, and she worked with a variety of mediums including oil and pastel. She later became well known for her landscapes, genre-scenes and portraits. Tully kept a studio in Toronto (from 1888 to 1890), where she taught regular classes, and participated steadily in the artistic life of the city. She also travelled internationally to paint and to participate in exhibitions, including sojourns in London (1895), the Netherlands (1906–1908) and the Jersey Channel Islands (1906–1908). Tully wrote articles for The Globe (now known as The Globe and Mail) on European affairs, and she illustrated a children's book which was published after her death in 1911.

== Major collections ==
Tully's work is in the collections of the Art Gallery of Ontario, National Gallery of Canada, Museum London, and Government of Ontario.

== Works ==
- The Twilight of Life, 1894
- Flower Market, Paris, 1907
- Knalhaven, Dordrecht, 1907
- Washing Day, c.1910

== Major exhibitions ==
Tully exhibited regularly with the Ontario Society of Artists and the Royal Canadian Academy of Arts. She participated in numerous other exhibitions, including the Art Association of Montreal (precursor to the Montreal Museum of Fine Arts), 1892–1909; the Toronto Industrial Exhibition (precursor to the Canadian National Exhibition, 1890–1910; the World's Columbian Exposition in Chicago; the Salon (Paris), 1888; and the Royal Academy of Arts, 1896–1897. A Memorial Exhibition of Tully's Paintings and Drawings was held in the Art Metropole Galleries in Toronto in 1911.

== Awards ==
For her painting The Twilight of Life, Tully won an honorable mention at the Pan-American Exposition in Buffalo and a bronze medal at the Canadian exhibition at the Louisiana Purchase Exposition in St. Louis, Missouri. She was elected a member of the Ontario Society of Artists in 1889, and became an Associate of the Royal Canadian Academy of Arts the same year.

== Legacy ==
Tully bequeathed her award-winning painting, The Twilight of Life, to the Art Gallery of Ontario (AGO). It became the first painting by a Canadian artist acquired by the gallery (1911). A second work, Evening on the Vaal, was acquired by the AGO by subscription in 1912. The AGO owns a third work, of a young woman painter working from a dressed female model.
