= Superior Court of Justice Building (Thunder Bay) =

Historic building in Thunder Bay, Ontario

Coordinates: 48.4379°N 89.2214°W

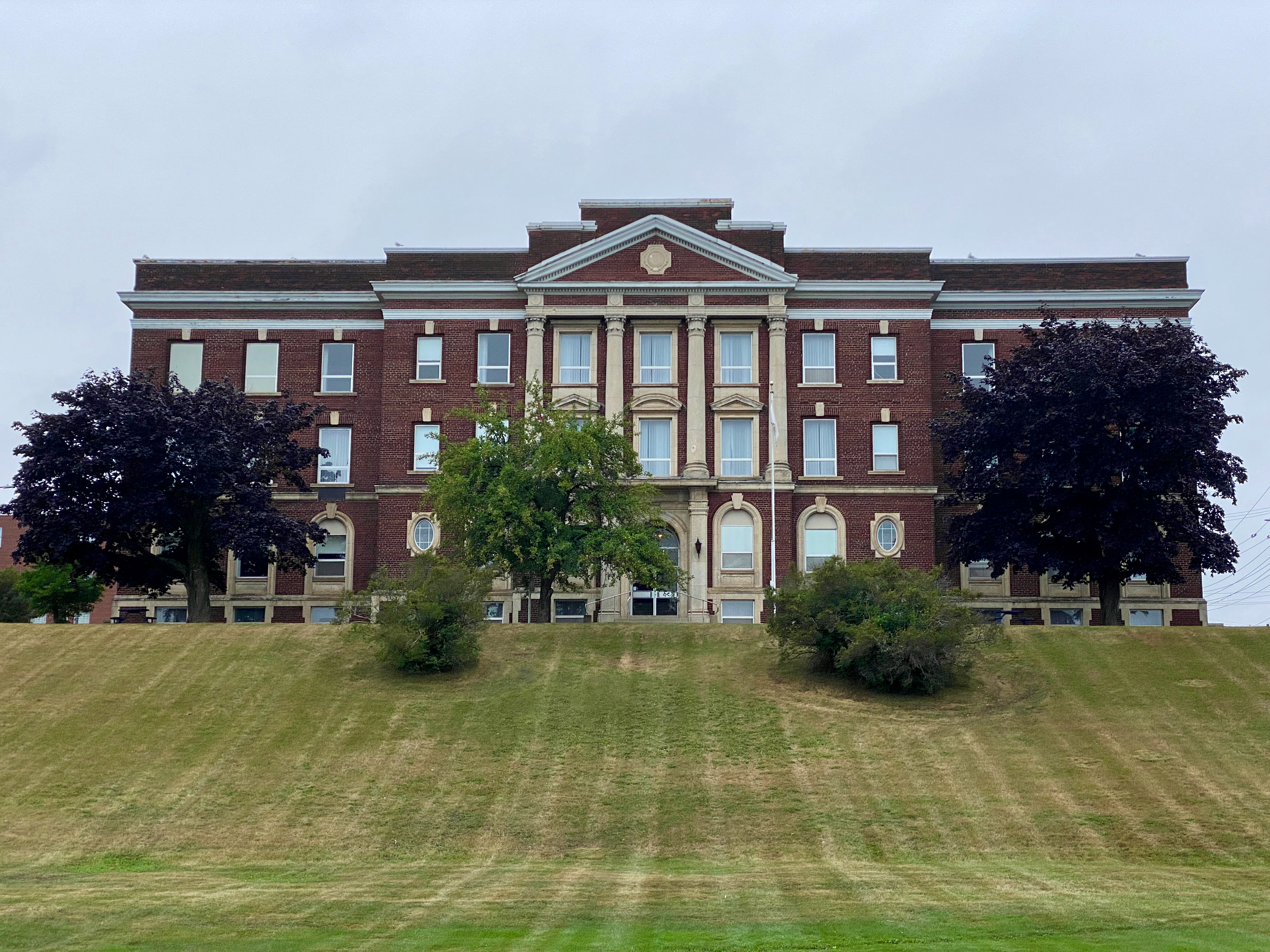
Photo of Superior Court of Justice Building which was former Thunder Bay courthouse.

Superior Court of Justice Building, Thunder Bay is a former courthouse built in 1924 by Chief Architect for Ontario Francis R. Heakes. The simple Beaux-Arts building served as a courthouse from 1924 to 2014. The Superior Court of Justice (277 Camelot Street) and Ontario Court of Justice (1805 Arthur Street East) had operated in separate buildings but relocated to the new Thunder Bay Courthouse (125 Brodie Street North) in 2014.

The old court building was sold in 2017. As of August 2021, it has been converted into a boutique hotel called The Courthouse Hotel.
