= Desjardins Canal =

Canal in Ontario, Canada

Coordinates: 43.2697°N 79.9319°W

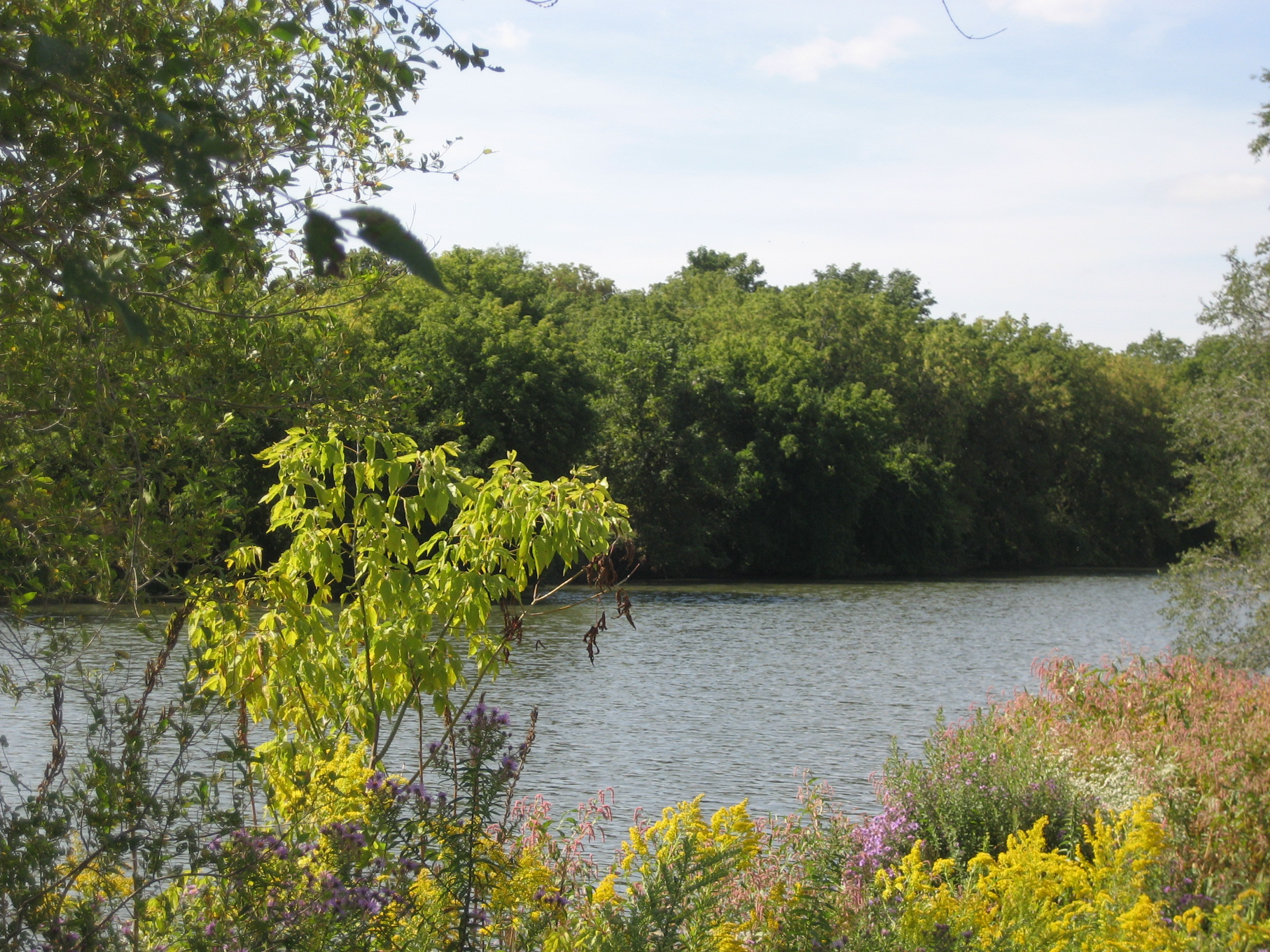
Desjardins Canal

The Desjardins Canal, named after its promoter Pierre Desjardins, is a historic canal in Ontario, Canada. It was built to give the town of Dundas easier access to Lake Ontario and the Great Lakes system of North America. Although a technological achievement and a short-term commercial success, the canal was soon eclipsed by the railway, and Dundas by neighbouring Hamilton.

== History ==
=== Context ===
Following the US Revolutionary War the British government felt an urgent need to populate the interior of the province of Upper Canada. The immediate concern was to find a refuge for Loyalists forced from their previous homes in the United States. After the early settlement of Kingston and the lower St. Lawrence River, and the establishment of Butler's Rangers and others in the Niagara peninsula, the possibility also existed for Loyalist communities at the head of Lake Ontario.

Another priority was the need to accelerate the settlement of the unoccupied areas in western Upper Canada to provide a buffer zone between that province and the United States in the event of further hostilities. Lieutenant-Governor John Graves Simcoe hoped to achieve this by offering free 200-acre (80 ha) grants of land in the interior of the province to prospective settlers regardless of nationality. It had been expected that this would entice from the United States immigrants who would become loyal citizens and add to the province's defensive capability. However land in the Ohio Territory and western New York proved more to their liking.

To make the area more attractive, Simcoe wished to open transportation arteries between the interior of the province and the shipping corridor provided by Lake Ontario and the Saint Lawrence River. Not only would these support commercial services for the expanding population and economy of the new territory, they would also serve military purposes, routing traffic away from areas controlled by the United States.

The story of the area around the head of the lake during the early 19th century is one of competition between the towns of Dundas, Ancaster and Hamilton to service this increased trade and achieve economic supremacy. Each town had its unique advantages and disadvantages which might make it more or less attractive to prospective businessmen and settlers. Ancaster had an abundance of fertile land, streams adequate to power mills, and a population of nearly two thousand people. However, for an industrial economy to develop, easy access to Lake Ontario was critical. As Ancaster did not border on the lake, in the 1820s and 1830s Dundas, with better water access, an established commercial centre, a relatively stable industrial base and available water power eclipsed it in size and importance. However Dundas in turn was challenged by Hamilton.

In 1816 the district of Gore had been created at the head of the lake amid jockeying over the selection of the district town. The previous year George Hamilton, then living in Queenston, had decided to move away from the border with the United States due to concern about further conflict. Well-connected (his father had been a member of the Legislative Council and an extensive landowner), he was aware that a new district was to be established and purchased a substantial amount of land in the area from James Durand. Within a year Hamilton had been selected as the district town. The Desjardins Canal was the centerpiece of Dundas’ efforts to adjust to this development and preserve its early status as the industrial hub of the area.

=== Early manoeuvring ===
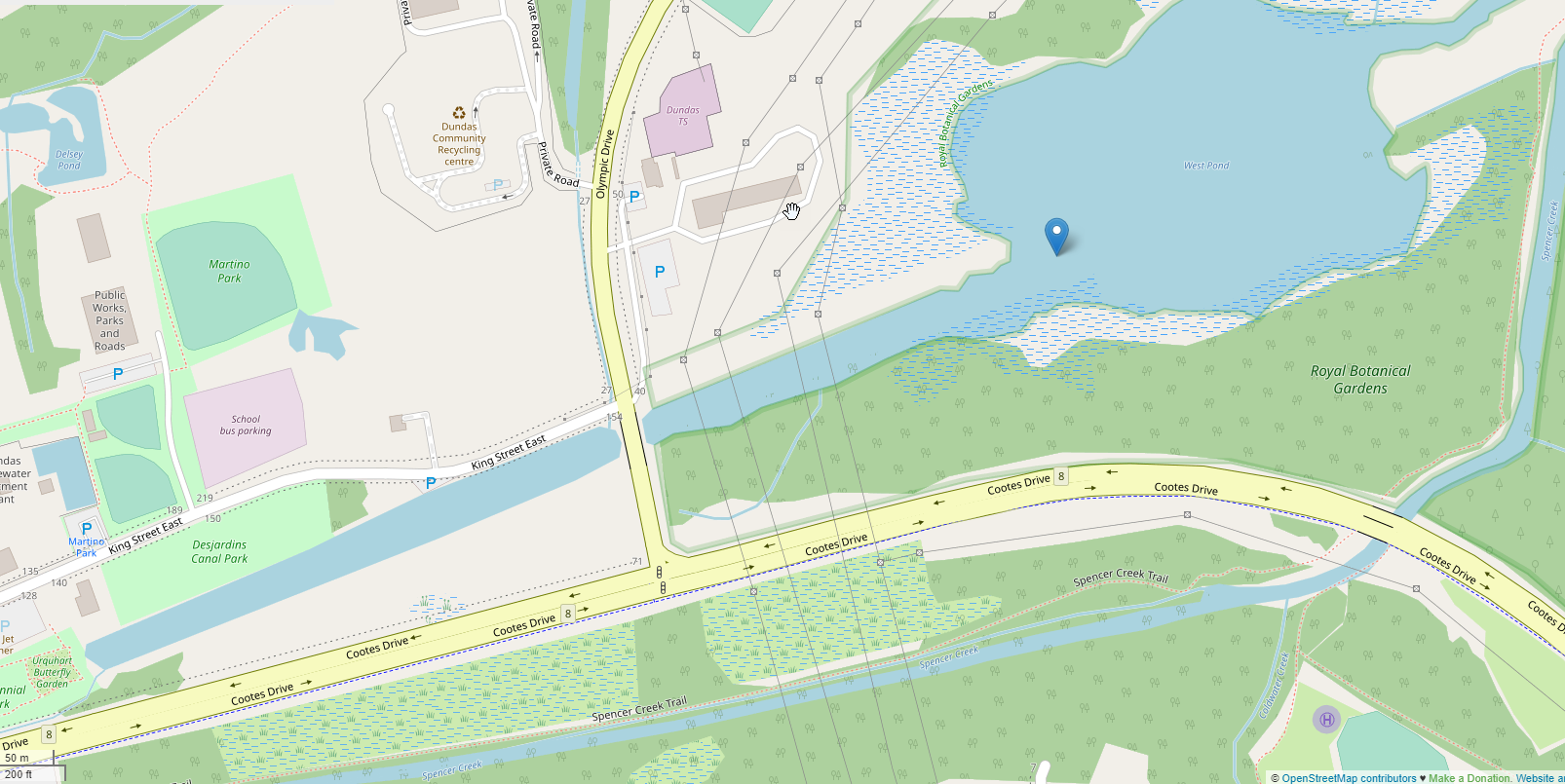
Map of the canal

Access to Lake Ontario from the mainland was made more difficult by the topography of the area, which included a large sandbar, a natural sand and gravel barrier, across Burlington Bay. A water outlet to the lake through a depression in the sandbar existed but it was intermittent and quite near the water's surface with a clearance of two to three feet, allowing only small boats and bateaux to pass through. For any other type of craft it was necessary for the cargo to be unloaded, carried across the barrier, and then reloaded on another vessel for further handling.

Because of this obstacle to any commercial shipping entering the bay from Lake Ontario all parties had an interest in seeing the barrier breached. Restricted access to Burlington Bay was a concern for reasons other than the usual commercial ones. One involved vessel safety, as access to a protected harbour had obvious advantages in the event of lake storms. There were also military considerations. Since action on the Niagara Peninsula could be expected in any future war with the United States, warships sheltering in Burlington Bay could be protected by land-based guns.

An added incentive was that the liberalization of the British Navigation Acts in the 1820s meant that certain U.S. products could be exported from Canada as though they had originated there, allowing the U.S. Midwest to share in Colonial preferences and attracting additional trade from this source. Improved access to the lake from the entrepôts at the limits of land transportation was required for the scheme to achieve its full potential. However, with the road network in the province at that time being dismal at best, improving water transportation, was seen as vital to economic growth.

It was in this context that the government of Upper Canada authorized in 1823 the construction of a canal through the sandbar. In 1826 the passage was completed, allowing schooners to sail right up to Hamilton's doorstep. Hamilton then became a major port and quickly expanded as a center of trade and commerce. Access to the hinterland through Dundas was still easier as the Dundas Valley offered a natural route up the Niagara Escarpment, yet its major problem, difficult passage of goods and produce through the marsh, still existed. The two most influential people in the effort to ensure that Dundas got its share of increased trade with the interior were Richard Hatt and Peter Desjardins.

=== Key players ===
Richard Hatt emigrated from England to Canada in 1792, settling first at Niagara and moving, possibly as early as 1796, to Ancaster. In 1798 Richard and his brother Samuel Hatt built his so-called "Red Mill" in Ancaster and cleared a road from there to Dundas to attract customers. However success in Ancaster was limited and he soon focused his attention on Spencer Creek in the Dundas area, which not only had ample water to power a mill but also potentially better access to Lake Ontario and the interior of the province.

In 1800 Richard and Samuel Hatt purchased land for a flour mill in Dundas. Recognizing the need for facilities near the inlet to the marsh, where cargoes were loaded and unloaded because of the lack of water clearance over the sandbar, Richard petitioned for land to build a storehouse and wharf. This request was granted in 1804. The brothers expanded their holdings by building warehouses on both Burlington beach and in Cootes Paradise (the early name for Dundas), and also funding the clearing of debris from Spencer Creek and the deepening of portions of the channel between Burlington beach and Dundas.

The Hatts saw the benefits of controlling not only the milling operation but also the transportation of goods to and from the area. Richard Hatt eventually purchased his brother's shares in the enterprise, and in 1809 he received approval to deepen the channel through the village of Coote's Paradise to the wharf at his mill. By 1808 he owned all the water rights and mills from Webster's Falls to Main Street in Dundas and in that year cleared a path through the marsh, which was used until the canal opened in 1837. Hatt set in place the initial plans and facilities from which the Desjardins Canal would later emerge. When he died in 1819 he was one of the wealthiest men in Upper Canada, having an interest in over 10,000 acres (40 km^{2}) of land, several farms and several industries along Spencer Creek. On his death his business was divided. His waterway, storage and bateau interests were acquired by Pierre (Peter) Desjardins while his milling interests and water rights were taken over by others.

Desjardins, who was born in France, came to Canada in 1792. Following his arrival he worked in several locations, from 1812 serving as a clerk for Richard Hatt while Hatt was away campaigning. He held this position until Hatt's death in 1819, then becoming a partner with William Lyon Mackenzie in a warehouse on the bank of Spencer Creek. Desjardins saw the considerable benefits possible if access from the lake to Dundas were improved. He was primarily interested in developing a canal between his property and Burlington Bay but also promoted related schemes, including a second canal (never built) extending from the Desjardins Canal in Dundas to Lake Huron. The proposal would have allowed the Desjardins Canal a direct water access to the western areas of both Canada and the United States and might have proved financially attractive, if technically viable. However, by this time the Erie Canal was completed and the Welland Canal was well on its way so undoubtedly the competition was seen to be too great, considering the late start.

=== Search for support ===
In 1820 Desjardins had petitioned the government for a lot on Spencer Creek as well as for a small island in front of the lot. He planned to build a storehouse beside Spencer Creek, deepen the creek to make a channel from the town to the marsh and cut a channel through the marsh to allow access of larger boats from Lake Ontario. The government was far from being solidly behind the project but was willing to let Desjardins go ahead on an experimental basis as long as in case of failure no risk would be transferred to the province. Desjardins’ proposal to provide access for "sloops and small vessels" was endorsed by local business leaders and approved by an order-in-council Nov 14, 1820, with the injunction that Desjardins could not charge tolls for access to the properties.

Unfortunately, during the 1820s there was a serious depression and a reversal in the flour trade. For three years Desjardins circulated a prospectus to draw in capital but was unsuccessful. In spite of this he persevered and made substantial progress using his own resources. In 1825 a group of local incorporators, seeing in the canal a means of directing additional business to themselves and increasing the value of their real estate holdings, applied for a charter to build the canal. A joint stock company was planned.

Royal assent to the formation of the corporation was given on January 30, 1826. Eight hundred shares of capital stock were authorized at a price of £12/10/0 for a projected capitalization of £10,000. The parliamentary approval provided for a fifty-year lease, with title to revert to the Crown after that period subject to reimbursement to the stockholders of the value of their holdings. Desjardins was granted land including a lot on North Quay Street in Coote's Paradise, a piece of land on the bank of the creek in front of the lot and a small island in the creek itself.

However Desjardins did not live to see the results of his efforts. The costs that he personally incurred to get the Desjardins Canal project under way exhausted his assets and credit. He had hoped to be reimbursed when investor capital began to flow but instead was required by the agreement with the province to accept canal stock for one half of his expenditures and security (a provincial bond) for the other half. No actual cash was forthcoming. By 1827 he was forced to offer his house and some land for sale to finance work on the canal.

Peter Desjardins died on September 7, 1827, from injuries received while collecting amounts owing for stock in the Desjardins Canal. When his horse returned without a rider a search was made and Desjardins’ body was discovered. An inquest was inconclusive and finally ruled that Desjardins had "Died by the visitation of God". There were no witnesses to the event and the cause of death was never truly known.

=== Progress ===
The project to build Desjardins Canal continued for ten years, from 1827 to 1837. It was a local operation with limited objectives and attracted financial backers and political support almost exclusively from within Upper Canada. In this it contrasted with such projects as the Welland Canal, the completion of which was of international importance, and whose individual backers were largely from outside the province.

Once work on the Desjardins Canal had begun in earnest it was necessary to recruit a supply of workers. Although canal labourers were much in demand due to the many projects previously alluded to, still wages were low, fluctuating around two to three shillings per day, an amount barely sufficient for a family's basic needs. The Desjardins Canal Company hired labourers directly for some tasks, for others dealing with contractors who would then recruit the labour force themselves.

Attracting capital was a continuing problem for the company. Available records do not indicate that at any time more than 70-80% of the authorized shares were subscribed or that more than £6000 (out of an authorized £10000) was raised in this way. A limited amount of money came from canal operations (tolls) but for the bulk of the needed capital other sources were required. Government financial support was continually necessary to prop up the company. The early 1830s were especially bleak.

However work continued in spite of all the difficulties that the project had endured, and by 1837 the company was able to put the final touches on the canal. For that year the company's financial statements recorded income of close to £6000 of which the majority, £5,000, was from a government loan. £166 was received from canal tolls in 1837, the first year for which any operating income was recorded. The canal was officially opened and dedicated on August 16, 1837, to great celebration and hoopla. Steamers brought revellers to Dundas from Hamilton for concerts and an evening dinner.

=== Mid-century ===
Dundas experienced significantly increased prosperity once the canal opened. Since flour could now be shipped more cheaply, the local mills prospered. Shipments of lumber-based products of all types increased. Once the canal had provided an outlet to the lake, local manufacturers could sell to a broader market. As money flowed into the area, the town was able to accumulate capital to finance the growth of local industries. The population, which had been 800 in 1836, had increased to 2000 by this time. Soon, sailing vessels were being built in the turning basin.

Despite the economic benefits that the canal was generating, the company continued to struggle with technical and financial problems. Repairs and improvements were necessary to make canal operations viable on an ongoing basis, but sufficient money was not available from private sources or canal operations. There were, however, some bright spots. Increased imports of coal and pig iron through the canal were indicative of the fact that an industrial economy was developing in Dundas. Imports of merchandise rapidly increased as the population grew, the economy developed, and people had more money to spend.

By the beginning of the 1850s, the citizens of Dundas had reason to feel optimistic about their town. In 1849, 14,000 tons of produce had been shipped via the Desjardins Canal, reflecting importance of the canal in the export trade of the area. The road network construction connecting Dundas with the back country was also accelerated by the Paris and Dundas Road Company. The Desjardins Canal Company was able to keep the canal operational by means of a scaled down dredging operation.

Along the canal, a warehouse 120 by 100 feet (30 m), described as one of the largest in British North America, was nearing completion and had already been rented by a Toronto firm. There were several other warehouses on the margin of the canal and it was not uncommon to ship more than 100,000 barrels of flour yearly through the port. However, the coming of railway service to Hamilton caused added complications and the competition finally doomed the canal.

=== End of the road ===
The first railway in Canada was the Champlain and St. Lawrence Railroad, built in 1836 in Lower Canada to connect ports on the St. Lawrence and Richelieu Rivers. The potential for railroad transportation in Upper Canada was quickly recognized and almost immediately the Desjardins Canal Company was forced to deal with this new source of competition. Railways came on stream rapidly during the mid-1850s but the one that had the most impact on Dundas and the Desjardins Canal was the Great Western Railway connecting Niagara Falls and Windsor through Hamilton, Dundas and London. This development was good news for the province as a whole but, as the lines serviced areas on which the Desjardins Canal depended for much of its traffic, they had a negative impact on the canal company.

While the canal continued to provide benefits to Dundas, its problems did not abate. Chief among them were financial issues as the canal continued to be unable to generate sufficient operating income to remain viable. Competition from the railroads, and from the network of roads allowing improved travel between producers and consumers, certainly contributed to this. Another factor was that, with the development of steam-based power technology, it became possible to locate industry away from sources of water power. This, along with the availability of waterfront access not dependent on the vagaries of the Desjardins Canal, accelerated the growth of industry on Hamilton's bayshore to the detriment of Dundas.

All this was exacerbated by squabbling between the railroad, road, and canal companies about bridge construction and rights-of-way. As the canal cut through the shortest route between Toronto and Hamilton for both rail and road traffic, it was necessary to bridge the gap in some way to accommodate land-based traffic. Conflict over the years centered on building a low-level bridge (cheaper but with the potential to block canal traffic, and difficult for trains to use) or a high-level one (more expensive but providing a straight and level base for train traffic). The bridges also presented safety issues, most notably in 1857 when a train wreck, killing 59 people received wide attention.

Protracted negotiations between the contending companies led nowhere. Finally, the Desjardins Canal Company was offered $10,000 if it would close the canal down. However, the town of Dundas had become the canal's principal mortgage holder, with a $52,000 stake in the canal, and as income from future tolls was the only apparent way by which this debt could be discharged, the offer was refused. To protect their interest, the town seized the canal to settle the mortgage and applied to the government for relief from canal debts. This was granted in 1873. However, the bridges were still perceived to be in an unstable condition. This, along with the rapidly dropping canal revenues, caused the town to reverse its position and agree to close the canal, subject to payments of $35,000 each from both the road company and the railway company.

For all practical purposes, the canal had ceased to have a serious commercial future once a low level road bridge was constructed in 1869, denying access to most lake schooners. Writing in 1875 a local historian commented on "The ill-fated Desjardins canal. It is now seldom used except by raftsmen to float timber into Burlington Bay, or sometimes by the people of Dundas who might use the small boat Argylle to convene pleasure parties to Rock Bay or other points along the shore."

In 1876, the canal company was liquidated. The canal was turned over to the Crown as required by the original incorporation agreement and became a public work. However, the provincial government in the past had no interest in equity ownership and the canal was placed under the control and management of the town of Dundas by an Order in Council on April 25, 1877. In October of that year, full ownership was transferred to the town by two additional Orders in Council. In 1878, a canal committee was struck by Dundas, the canal was dredged again, tolls were revised and advertisements for business were published. However, this was to little avail and in 1895 direct rail service to Dundas was inaugurated, ending commercial potential for the Desjardins Canal. Today, it can be seen north of Cootes Drive in east Dundas within Cootes Paradise. As part of the renaissance in the area, the city of Hamilton established a walking path along the canal.

== See also ==
- Desjardins Canal disaster, in the 1857 train wreck
