= Kivas Tully =

Irish-Canadian architect (1820–1905)

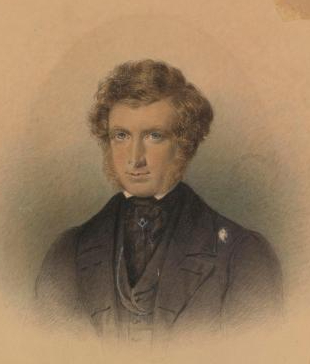
- Born: 9 March 1820; Garryvacum, Queen's County (now County Laois), Ireland, United Kingdom of Great Britain and Ireland
- Died: 24 April 1905 (aged 85); Toronto, Ontario, Canada
- Education: Royal Naval School
- Occupation: Architect
- Relatives: Sydney Strickland Tully (daughter)
- Awards: Imperial Service Order.
- Practice: John George Howard

Kivas Tully, ISO (1820 – 24 April 1905) was an Irish-Canadian architect.

== Life ==
Born in Garryvacum in County Laois, Ireland, Kivas Tully was the son of John P. Tully, a lieutenant in the Royal Navy, and Alicia Willington. He trained as an architect at the Royal Naval School in London, England, before coming to the Province of Canada in 1844, arriving in Toronto, where he began working at the firm of John George Howard, designing many important buildings throughout southern Ontario.

Following Canadian Confederation, Tully joined the Ontario Department of Public Works in 1868. He was appointed the first Ontario Provincial architect (1868–1896) and engineer. He was involved in the supervising of the competition leading to the design of the Ontario Legislative Building at Queen's Park. As the provincial department of public works' chief architect, Tully supervised a series of district courthouses built in northern Ontario. The courthouse at Parry Sound designed in 1871 still forms the core of the present courthouse complex.

The Ontario Archives hold drawings for virtually all provincial buildings including courthouses, registry offices, goals & lock-ups, schools and colleges, hospitals and other works executed under his supervision from 1896 until 1926.

In 1903, Tully was awarded the Imperial Service Order. He had retired in 1896 and died in Toronto on 24 April 1905.

== Works ==
Some of his more prominent projects include:

Project	Year Completed	Location	Notes	Image
Bank of Montreal	1846	Northwest corner of Yonge Street and Front Street, Toronto	Neoclassical in style with quarters on the second and third floors for the manager and his family, the three-story stone building was demolished in 1886 for a new Beaux-Arts Bank of Montreal office which now houses the Hockey Hall of Fame.	
St. Catharines Courthouse	1850	St. Catharines, Ontario	Neoclassical in finished and rough limestone, sympathetic limestone addition in 1865	St. Catharines Courthouse
Old Trinity College	1852	Trinity Bellwoods Park, Toronto	Gothic Revival. Demolished in 1956.	Old Trinity College, Toronto
Victoria Hall	1860	Cobourg, Ontario	Neoclassical	Victoria Hall (City Hall), Cobourg, Ontario
Welland County Courthouse	1858	Welland, Ontario	Designed in the Neoclassical style by Tully and constructed by John Hellems and William A. Bald of several courses of Queenston limestone. Addition added in 1954.	Welland County Court House in 2014.
First Trenton Town hall	1860	Trenton, Ontario	Neoclassical building was vacated by the police in the 1970s and now home to DBIA and Trent Port Historical Society Museum.	Trenton Town Hall (1860), Trenton, Ontario
London Asylum for the Insane	1870	London, Ontario	Main building demolished 1960s through to 1975 and only Infirmary or Exam Building remains. Site vacant but part of London Psychiatric Hospital (Regional Mental Health Care)	
Parry Sound District Courthouse	1871	89 James Street, Parry Sound, Ontario	Victorian court has had additions added 1920-1921 and still used as courthouse.	
School of Practical Science	1878	1 King's College Circle, Toronto, Ontario	Main building of the School of Practical Science at the University of Toronto, demolished in 1966 to make way for the Medical Sciences Building.	
Hamilton Asylum for the Insane	1879	Fennell Street West, Hamilton, Ontario	South cottage added 1885 and infirmary 1895; demolished 1990s; site now used by Centre for Mountain Health Services after transfer to St. Joseph's Healthcare-Hamilton	
Andrew Mercer Reformatory for Women	1880	King Street W., Toronto	Prison and treatment centre for women and girls. Gothic Revival style with tower. Closed and demolished in 1969.	
Orilla Asylum for the Insane	1886–1887		Memorial Road cottages; Main Building (Victorian) added 1889; renamed as Huronia Regional Centre since 1974	
Mimico Branch Asylum	1889–1895	New Toronto, Toronto	Victorian psychiatric hospital campus with Romanesque Revival and Gothic Revival influences, restored and repurposed by Humber College from 1991 to 2001.	
Brockville Asylum for the Insane	1892–1894	Prescott Road, Brockville, Ontario	Main building and cottages, 1892–94; later renamed as Brockville Psychiatric Hospital and now Brockville Mental Health Centre	

== Personal ==
Tully was married twice, first to Elizabeth Drew in 1844 (died 1847) and Maria Elizabeth Strickland in 1852 (died 1883). He had four daughters, and was survived by two, including the artist Sydney Strickland Tully (1860–1911), when he died in 1905.

== Publications ==
- Preliminary report of the engineer, on the survey of the various routes, for the proposed ship canal, to connect the waters of lakes Huron & Ontario at Toronto, presented to the president of the Board of Trade, 1857.

== See also ==
Other Ontario provincial architects include:

- Francis R. Heakes
- George A. White
- George N. Williams

Political offices
Preceded by N/A	Chief Provincial Architect, Ontario; 1868–1896	Succeeded by Francis R. Heakes
