= Francis R. Heakes =

Canadian architect (1858–1930)

- Born: July 30, 1858; Toronto, Canada West
- Died: 1930 (aged 71–72)
- Occupation: Architect
- Practice: Chief Architect of the Public Works Department of the Province of Ontario
- Buildings: Government House

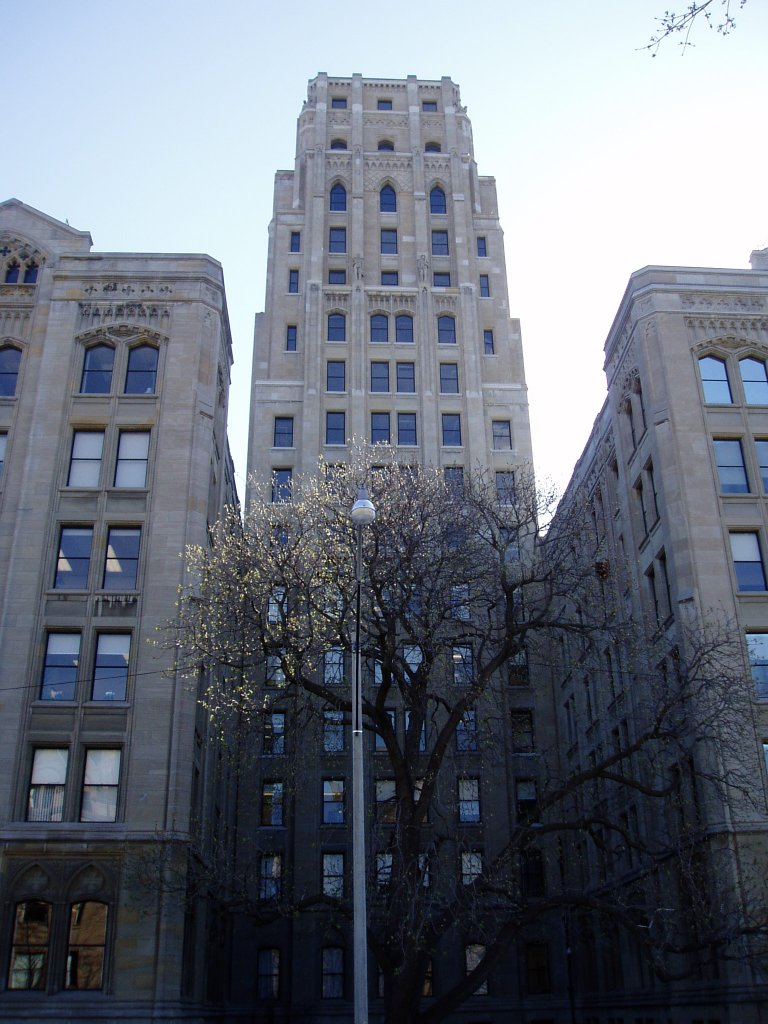
The Whitney Block (formerly the East Block of Queens Park) in downtown Toronto. It was designed by F. R. Heakes and erected in two phases between 1926 and 1932.

Francis Riley Heakes (1858 - 1930) was a Canadian architect. He studied under Kivas Tully in the mid-1880s.

Heakes was born in Toronto to British immigrants Samuel Heakes and Elizabeth Isabella Riley.

He was at one time Chief Architect of the Public Works Department of the province of Ontario. The Ontario Archives hold drawings for virtually all provincial buildings including courthouses, registry offices, gaols & lockups, schools and colleges, hospitals and other works executed under his supervision from 1896 until 1926.

Among his important commissions were the Whitney Block in downtown Toronto, the Mining Building at the University of Toronto (1905), and the Superior Court of Justice in Thunder Bay (1924). Perhaps his most famous commission was Government House in Toronto (Chorley Park), designed in a style reminiscent of French châteaux. It was one of the most expensive residences ever constructed in Canada at the time (1915), and was more impressive than even Rideau Hall in size and grandeur. The building was demolished in 1961.

Other notable projects involving Heakes:

- Osgoode Hall West Wing addition 1908 and North Wing 1910-1912
- Lakeshore Psychiatric Hospital Chapel and Assembly Hall 1896 and Fire Hall 1919
- Ontario Agricultural College, Guelph, Ontario various buildings from 1896 to 1929

== See also ==
Other Ontario provincial architects included:

- Kivas Tully
- George A. White
- George N. Williams

Political offices
Preceded by Kivas Tully	Chief Provincial Architect, Ontario; 1896 – 1926	Succeeded by George A White
