= Victoria Hall (Cobourg) =

Town hall in Ontario, Canada

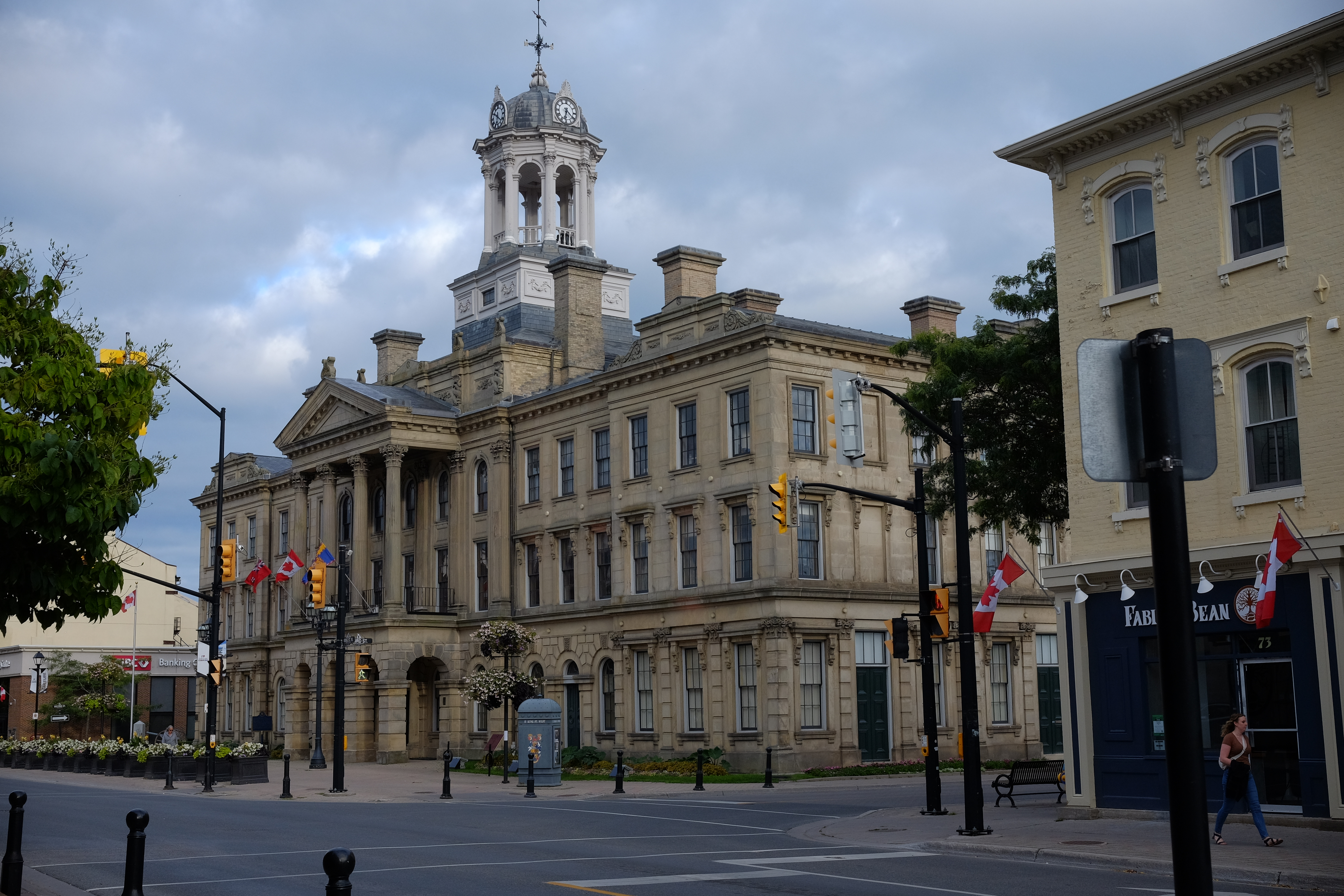
- Interactive map of the Victoria Hall area

General information
- Location: Cobourg, Ontario, Canada
- Coordinates: 43°57′34″N 78°10′04″W

Design and construction
- Architect: Kivas Tully

Victoria Hall is a 19th-century building that serves as the Town Hall and multi-functional space in downtown Cobourg, Ontario, Canada. It was built during a time when Cobourg was prospering financially and was believed to be named the capital of Upper Canada. Victoria Hall opened in 1860 and was declared a national historic site in 1959 due to it being a good example of the public edifice of mid-19th century Canada.

== Architecture ==
Victoria Hall is a neoclassical style building faced with imported Cleveland sandstone and topped with a prominent clock tower. In the 1850s, a design competition was held to determine who would construct the town hall and architect Kivas Tully won. The building's front entrance features a portico with Corinthian columns, a Greco-Roman roofed porch, and a speaker's balcony. The building is an ‘E’ shape and is completely symmetrical.

== Restoration ==
In 1970–1971, Victoria Hall was declared structurally unsafe and was vacated. The initial cost to create this building was estimated to be much lower than the actual price, resulting in little building maintenance over the years. A group of dedicated citizens banded together and created the Society for the Restoration of Victoria Hall in order to save the historic building. Lenah Field Fisher was one of the people responsible for the restoration of the building; she donated her estate and money to the cause and the foyer is named in memory of her. The building was officially reopened in 1983.

== Courtroom ==
The courtroom in Victoria Hall was modelled after the Old Bailey Courtroom in London, England. This was used as an active courtroom until late 2008 and was one of the very few remaining deep well courtrooms in Canada that were still in use. The mural on the back wall of the courtroom was original to the building and was preserved during the restoration. The mural is a trompe-l’oeil wall painting of the Royal Coat of Arms painted by Moser, a German artist.

== The Grand Concert Hall ==
The Concert Hall is a large open space that is hand painted in the same trompe-l’oeil style as the courtroom. The restoration process tried to replicate the patterns on the walls and ceilings to match the original building design. The Hall has been restored to retain its acoustical quality and can accommodate various types of performances and events.

== The Honourable James Cockburn Room ==
James Cockburn was Cobourg's Father of Confederation. He became a prominent lawyer in Cobourg and had an office inside Victoria Hall. The room dedicated to him is designed to represent how it may have looked in the 1860s and 1870s and features his actual ledger. The furniture decorating this room was not original to the building; it was donated from Lenah Field Fisher's estate.

== Filming ==
Many television shows and movies have used the interior and exterior of Victoria Hall for filming. Murdoch Mysteries have used the town hall on various occasions for filming their period piece television show. Victoria Hall was also used for filming the movie Butterbox Babies.

== See also ==
- Royal eponyms in Canada
