= Desjardins Canal disaster =

1857 rail transport disaster

Coordinates: 43.279611°N 79.890904°W

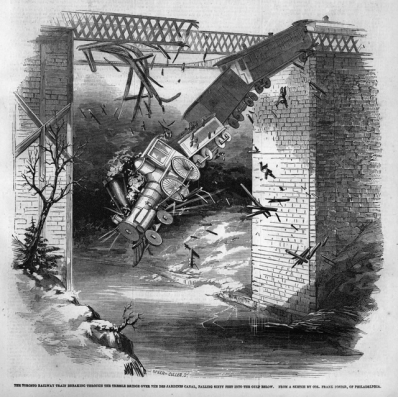
- A sketch of the Desjardins Canal disaster.

Details
- Date: March 12, 1857
- Location: Hamilton, Canada West, British North America
- Incident type: Train wreck
- Cause: Bridge collapse

Statistics
- Trains: 1
- Passengers: 90
- Deaths: 59
- Injured: 18

The Desjardins Canal disaster was a train wreck that occurred near Hamilton, Canada West, at 6:15 p.m. on March 12, 1857, when a train on the Great Western Railway crashed through a bridge over the Desjardins Canal, causing the train and its passengers to fall 18 metres (60 ft) into the ice below. With 59 deaths, it is considered one of the worst rail disasters in Canadian history.

== Recovery and rescue ==
The train had ninety passengers. Most in the last train car survived but others on the train either drowned or succumbed to injury. Locomotive lamps and fires were built to illuminate the scene to aid in rescue efforts. Ropes and ladders were lowered to bring the dead and wounded out of the train cars. One car, partially submerged, was accessed with axes by rescuers.

== See also ==
- List of rail accidents in Canada
- List of rail accidents (before 1880)
