= Great Western Railway (Ontario) =

Historic railway in Ontario, Canada

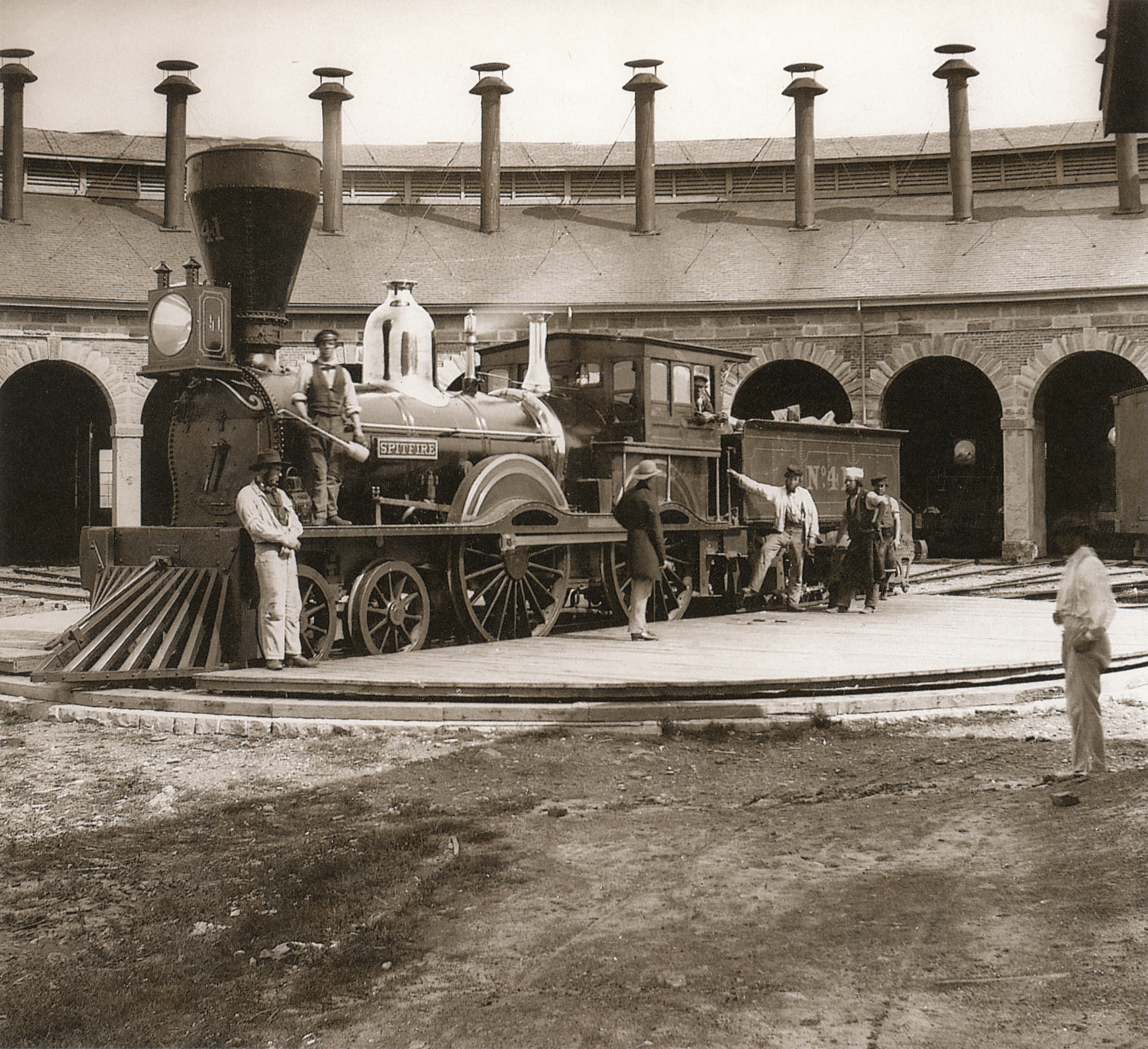
- The Great Western Railway's Spitfire locomotive.

Overview
- Headquarters: Hamilton, Ontario
- Locale: Southwestern Ontario, Niagara Peninsula
- Dates of operation: 1853–1882

Technical
- Track gauge: 4 ft 8 1/2 in (1,435 mm) standard gauge
- Previous gauge: Built to 5 ft 6 in (1,676 mm) but converted by the 1870s

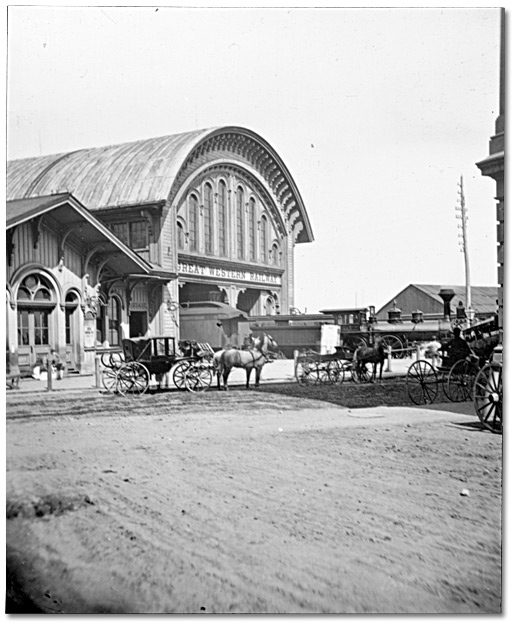
Great Western Railway station in Toronto in 1867 (later as Toronto Wholesale Fruit Market and now the site of Meridian Hall)

The Great Western Railway was a railway that operated in Canada West, today's province of Ontario, Canada. It was the first railway chartered in the province, receiving its original charter as the London and Gore Railroad on March 6, 1834, before receiving its final name when it was rechartered in 1845.

At its peak, the Great Western system stretched 1,371 kilometres (852 mi) with its main operating base in Hamilton. The city at the head of Lake Ontario was pivotal in opening up the unpopulated and heavily wooded interior of what was then known as Canada West. A substantial part of its revenue was from serving as a bridge line between the New York Central and Michigan Central Railroads, making it significant in North American history. Its lines remain in use, part of Canadian National Railway's network.

== History ==
Sir Allan MacNab was the driving force behind the financing of the railway in Canada (and less so in the United States and England), although he was pushed out of the company in 1854. Entrepreneur Samuel Zimmerman was instrumental in promoting its construction and Roswell Gardinier Benedict, a friend of Zimmerman's, was the assistant chief engineer and later the chief engineer.

Although it received the first charter to operate in Canada West, it was the second to begin operation. Due to the length of time to construct its lines, it was beaten into service by six months by the Ontario, Simcoe and Huron Railway. The original line completed in 1853–54 connected Niagara Falls to Windsor, running by way of Hamilton and London. In 1855 two important additions were made: the opening of the branch to Toronto and rail connections over the newly opened Niagara Falls Suspension Bridge. Further branches were opened to Sarnia and communities in the Bruce Peninsula.

MacNab's dismissal was directly related to a proposal from Zimmerman to purchase assets in the Niagara area, the Erie and Ontario Railway, a shortline around Niagara Falls; and the Niagara Harbour and Docks Company. In 1853, threatening to use these assets to start a competing railway with a shorter line between Niagara and Detroit, Zimmerman presented to the GWR board a proposal to instead sell them to the GWR. MacNab was against the proposal; it failed. As a consequence, GWR managing director Charles John Brydges, who had negotiated a purchase agreement with Zimmerman would engineer MacNab's dismissal from the board.

In 1855, traffic has risen to the level that GWR made plans to double-track its lines. As this required Legislature approval, Zimmerman was retained to secure its approval through his influence. In turn, Zimmerman would receive the contract to double-track the line. A clause of the approval granted an exemption for the GWR from the regulation for all trains to stop at all drawbridges.

The GWR used multiple stations in Toronto. Its first was a depot at the Queen's Wharf, then it secured the use of the Canadian Northern station at York Street. It built its own station at Yonge Street and the Esplanade in 1866. The GWR also used the Union Stations built in 1858 and 1873, built by the Grand Trunk Railway.

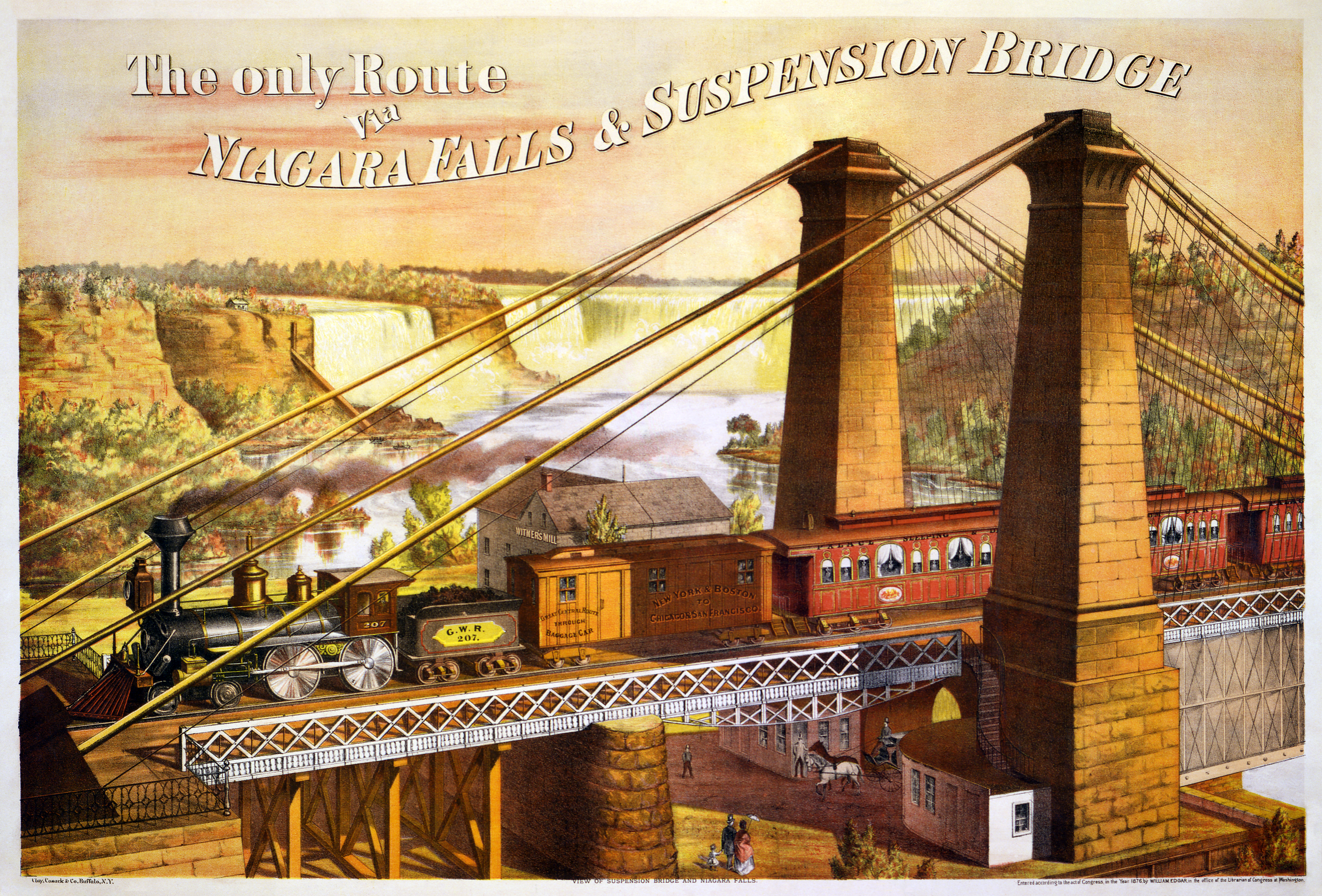
Advertisement for Great Western Railway travel via the Niagara Falls Suspension Bridge, c. 1876.

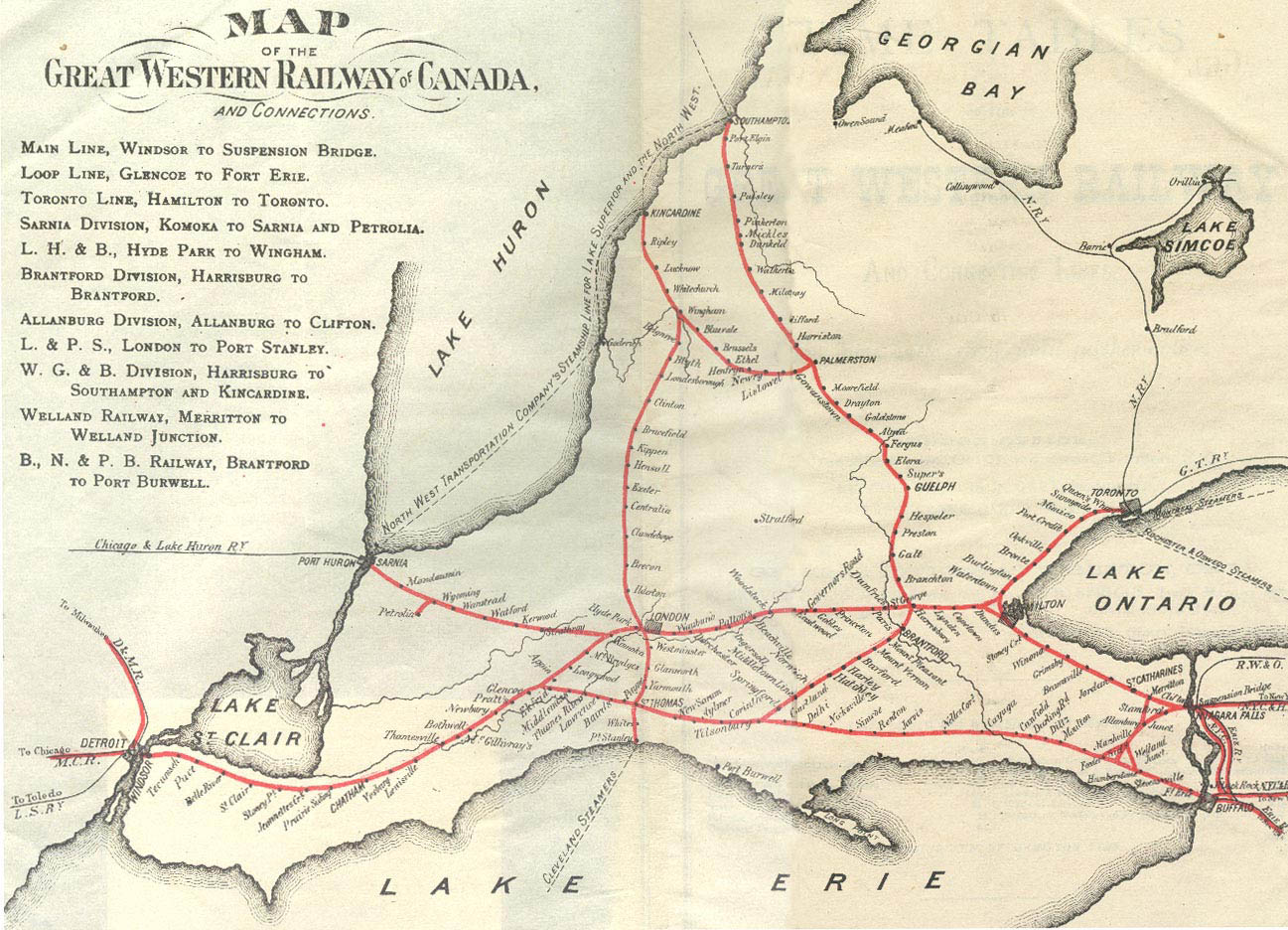
A map of the Great Western Railway in Ontario, Canada, as it was at its height in 1879.

The railway merged with the Grand Trunk Railway in August 1882, and ultimately became a major part of Canadian National Railway's southern Ontario routes. The majority of the mainlines remain in use. The main Niagara Falls–Windsor line is now the Canadian National Railway's Grimsby Subdivision, Dundas Subdivision, Chatham Subdivision, and CASO Subdivision. The Toronto branch is the Oakville Subdivision, and the Sarnia branch is the Strathroy Subdivision (which also includes a short piece of the mainline, from London to Komoka).

=== Timeline ===
- 1834: London and Gore Railroad incorporated.
- 1845: Reincorporated as the Great Western Rail Road Company.
- 1847: Groundbreaking ceremony at London.
- 1850: Branch line from Harrisburg to Galt is authorized.
- 1852: Galt and Guelph Railway is authorized.
- 1853:
  - Renamed the Great Western Railway.
  - November: Hamilton–Niagara Falls section of the mainline opens.
- 1854
  - January: Mainline opens.
  - August: Galt branch opens.
  - October: Jeannette's Creek train wreck.
- 1855
  - Contracting-out of rolling stock manufacturing is cancelled and rolling stock begins being manufactured in-house.
  - Toronto branch opens.
  - March: Niagara Falls Suspension Bridge opens.
  - November: first 6.4 kilometres (4 mi) of the Galt and Guelph Railway, from Galt to Preston, opens.
- 1857
  - Sarnia branch opens.
  - March: Desjardins Canal disaster.
  - June: Preston and Berlin Railway is incorporated by petition of the Galt and Guelph Railway Company.
  - September: Galt and Guelph Railway extension to Guelph opens.
- 1858: The first three sleeping cars are manufactured in-house.
- 1860
  - Locomotive manufacturing at the Great Western Hamilton shops begins.
  - The Great Western forecloses on the Galt and Guelph Railway's mortgages and takes it over directly.
- 1861: Scotia, built at the Great Western Hamilton shops, is the first locomotive in Canada built with a steel boiler.
- 1863: The Great Western has 83 first-class cars, including six sleeping cars.
- 1866: A dedicated Great Western station is constructed in Toronto at Yonge Street and the Esplanade.
- 1867: The Great Western mainline from Windsor to Niagara Falls is dual gauged.
- 1870: Legislation mandating use of provincial gauge is repealed, and the Great Western is the first railway in Canada to begin track gauge conversion to standard gauge.
- 1871: Eleven almost-new broad-gauge locomotives are sold by the Great Western to the Grand Trunk.
- 1872
  - Acquisition of the London and Port Stanley Railway.
  - Acquisition of the Wellington, Grey and Bruce Railway.
- 1873
  - The Long Depression begins, negatively impacting the Great Western's finances.
  - The last broad-gauge track is removed from the Great Western system, completing the process of gauge conversion.
  - New line is constructed from London to connect with the Kincardine branch at Wingham.
- 1874: 82 kilometres (51 mi) of the mainline is double-tracked; this is the first double-track mainline in Canada.
- 1882: Amalgamated with the Grand Trunk Railway.

== Accidents and incidents ==
=== Jeannette's Creek crash ===
Early in the morning of October 27, 1854, a Windsor-bound passenger train collided with a gravel train backing eastward, about 24 kilometres (15 mi) west of Chatham by Baptiste Creek. According to passenger W. O. Ruggles, there was dense fog and the gravel train's light could not be seen in time. The passenger train's locomotive collided at about 32 km/h (20 mph), derailing to the right. The four first-class cars were crushed into splinters. Thirty-five passengers were killed at the time of impact, and many remained in the ruins of the train for several hours before being extricated. Two second-class cars at the rear of the train landed on top of the first-class cars.

A grand jury found that Twitchell, conductor of the gravel train and Kettlewell, engineer of the train were criminally responsible for the death of 52 persons and they were charged with manslaughter. According to the jury, the gravel train had entered onto the track in contravention of the rules of the Great Western, and in any case, should not have proceeded onto the track in the dense fog.

=== Desjardins Canal disaster ===
On March 12, 1857, a train crashed into the Desjardins Canal railway swing bridge in Hamilton, causing its collapse and the train to plunge into the icy waters of the canal. The accident, known as the "Great Western Railway disaster", claimed 59 lives and injured 18 of the approximately 100 people aboard. One of the dead was Samuel Zimmerman, who had himself arranged the exemption clause to allow GWR trains to not stop at drawbridges. Had the train stopped, the loss of life might have been avoided. It was determined that an axle broke on the engine, causing the derailment.

As the train from Toronto approached the bridge, it derailed, crashing into the bridge. The bridge collapsed and the engine, the tender, a baggage car and two passenger cars crashed down to the thick ice of the canal below. The engine and tender fell through the ice. The baggage car bounced off the tender and fell to one side. The first passenger car landed upside-down on its roof, breaking into pieces and sinking through the ice. The second fell and rested vertically on one end. Several persons escaped from the second car as it started to sink; a conductor asleep in the baggage car was thrown from the wreck and woke up lying on the ice.

A coroner's inquest into the disaster began immediately. The switch tender on duty testified that a switch from the mainline to the bridge was broken by the train as it passed through the switch; the rail ties were damaged from before the switch to the bridge; the rails were bent to the east of the switch. He attributed it to a broken truck-wheel on the engine. Andrew Talcott the chief engineer of the Ohio and Mississippi Railroad, examined the engine and the bridge. He testified that an axle had broken on the engine, causing the cowcatcher on the front of the train to dip and rip up the timbers of the bridge, leading to its collapse.

== See also ==
- History of rail transport in Canada
- List of defunct Canadian railways
- List of Ontario railways
- Rail transport in Ontario
