= Samuel Zimmerman =

Canadian businessman

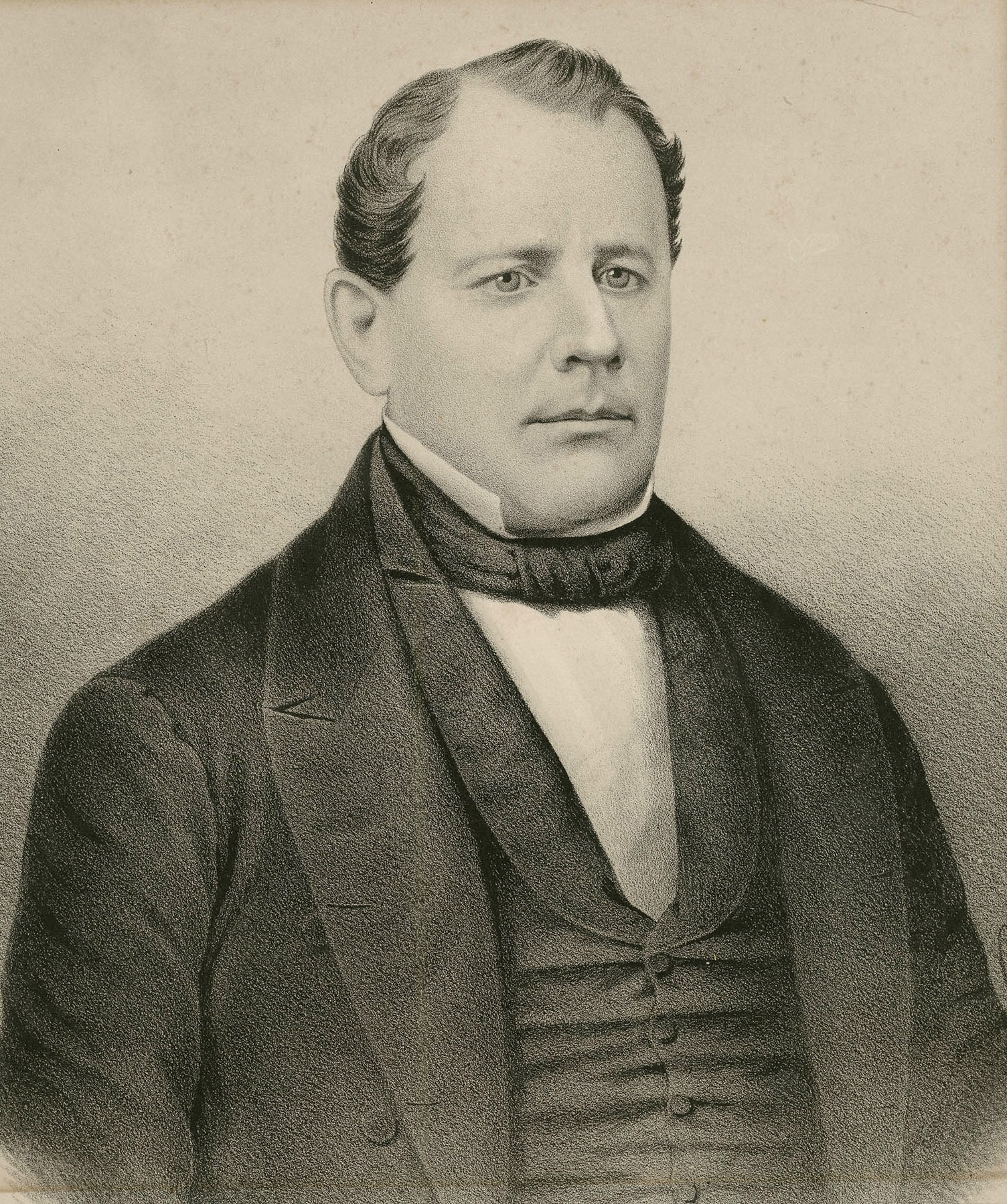
- Born: 7 March 1815; Huntingdon, Pennsylvania
- Died: 12 March 1857 (aged 42); Hamilton, Canada West

Samuel Zimmerman (7 March 1815 – 12 March 1857) was a Canadian railway promoter and entrepreneur instrumental in the construction of the Great Western Railway of Upper Canada.

== Biography ==
Zimmerman was born in 1815 in Huntingdon, Pennsylvania and worked as a general labourer on various public works projects in Pennsylvania and moved to Thorold, Ontario to help build the Second Welland Canal around 1842 to 1843 and settle in the Village Clifton on the Canadian side in the 1850s. He would help in the development of Clifton by opening Zimmerman Bank in 1855, built Clifton Gate House.

The Zimmerman Bank issued its own chartered banknotes, which are on display in the Bank of Canada Museum.

Zimmerman died on March 12, 1857, en route from Toronto to Niagara in Hamilton, Ontario, one of the victims of the Desjardins Canal disaster. He was buried at his estate and later moved to St. David's Methodist Church to be buried with his wife Margaret Ann Woodruff (b.1828, m. 1848 and d. 1851). He was survived by his second wife Emmeline Dunn (m. 1856) and sons (John and Richard) from his first marriage.

His son Richard Zimmerman later became a doctor and returned with his Toronto born wife Emma Jane Rogers to Niagara Falls.
