= Cobourg Museum Foundation =

Canadian foundation

The Cobourg Museum Foundation was incorporated under the laws of the province of Ontario on November 22, 1999. Letters Patent of Incorporation were issued on November 22, 1999, with Douglas Sifton, Muriel Edwards and Joan Chalovich as the first directors. The Foundation's creation grew out of the gradual deterioration of a limestone building believed to be the oldest building in the Town of Cobourg, Ontario, Canada.

== Purpose ==
The first of the objects of incorporation was "to acquire, restore and preserve the ancient limestone building known as 'The Barracks', located in the Town of Cobourg in the County of Northumberland, and to dedicate it to public use." In 2000 the old building was purchased and restoration work begun. On June 9, 2012, the building was opened to the public as the Exhibition Hall of the Sifton-Cook Heritage Centre, named after two of the founding members.

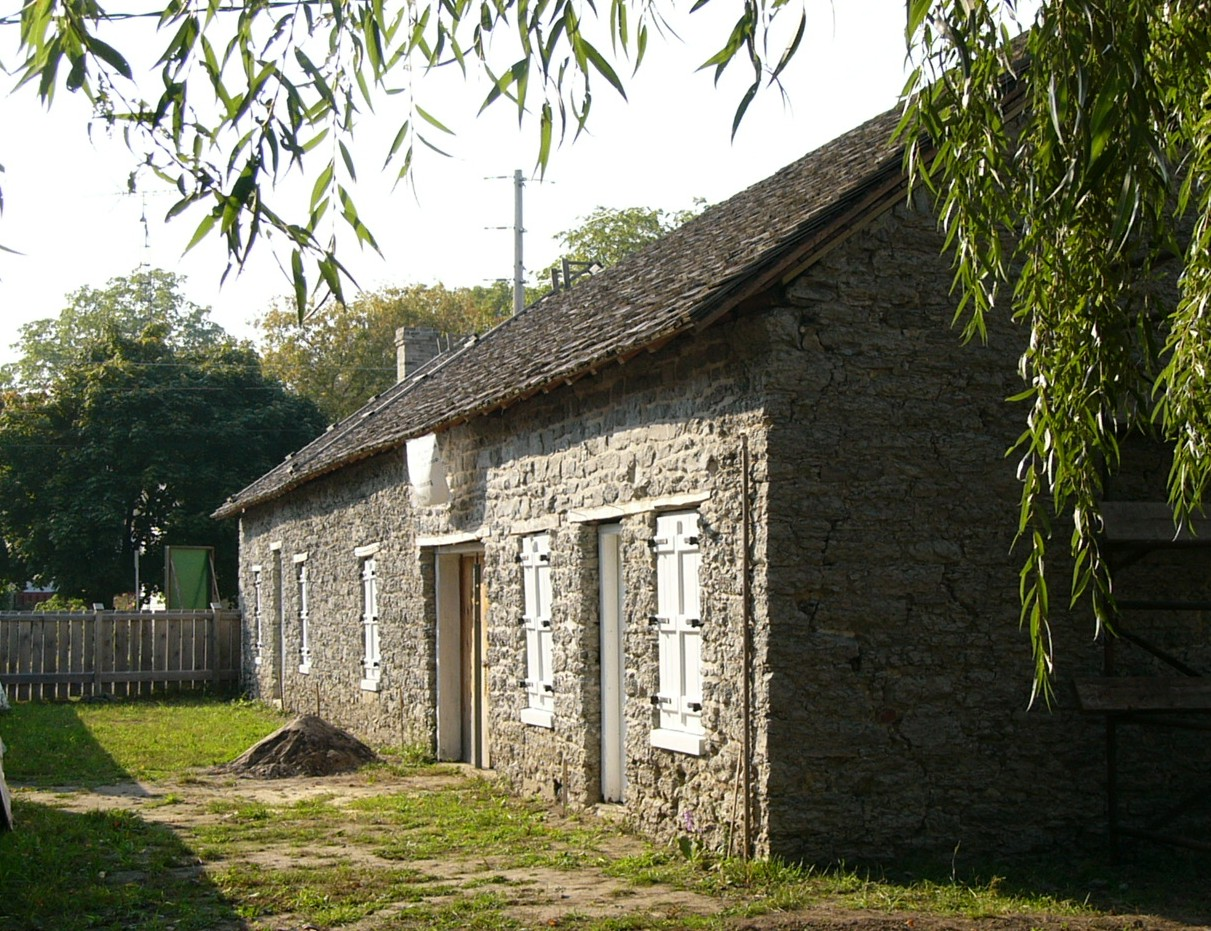
Cobourg "Barracks" - east view

== Charitable Status ==
On February 4, 2000, Cobourg Museum Foundation Inc. was designated as a Charitable Organization by the Canada Customs and Revenue Agency. It has received some funding from federal and provincial programs and has membership in the vicinity of 100 individuals and families.

== Further development ==
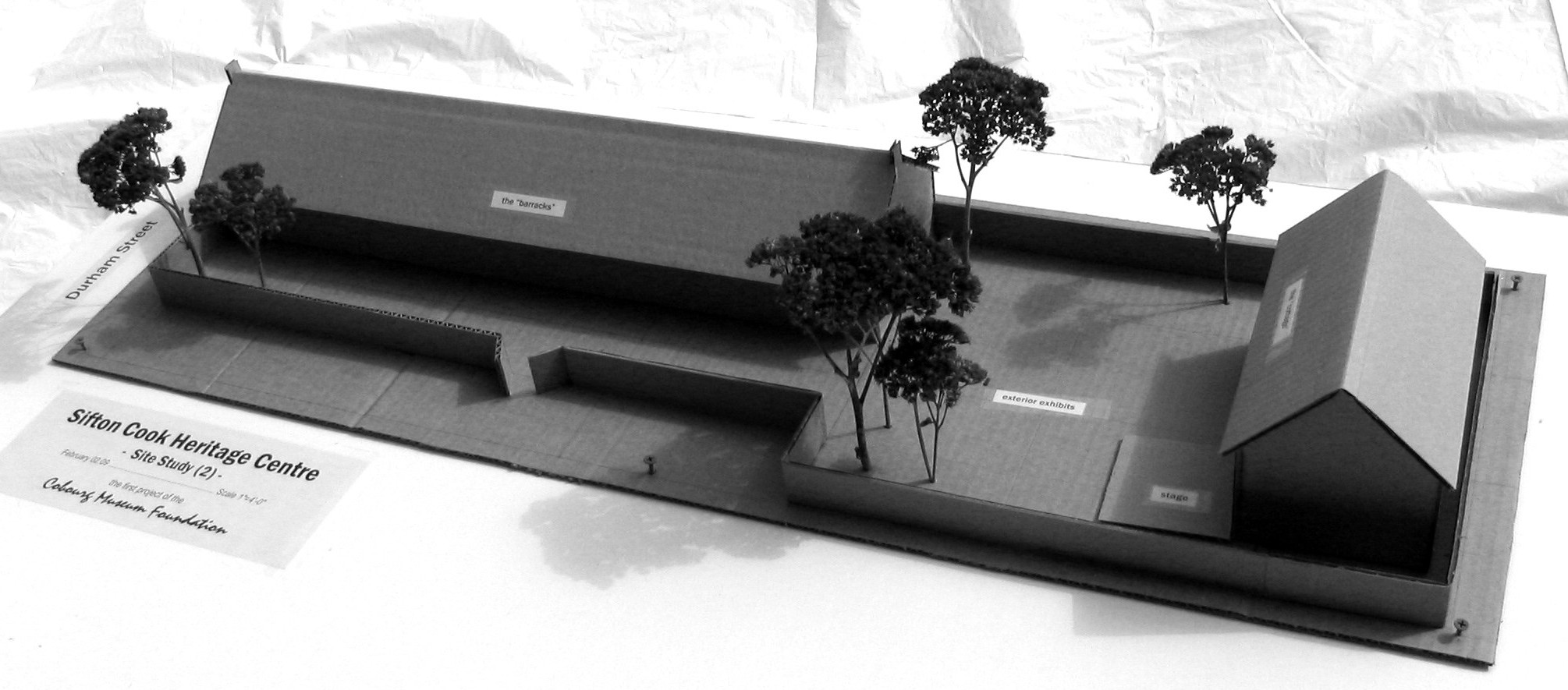
Site Plan showing Administrative Cottage and Exhibition Hall

In 2008, an 1860s workman's cottage, located on a nearby site slated for redevelopment, was donated to the Foundation and moved on site. Now fully restored, it houses a Visitors' Centre including a gift shop and research centre.

== Ongoing Projects ==
While the first project of the CMF was the restoration of its two buildings and their development into a local heritage centre, other small projects were undertaken concurrently. In 2002 the CMF began its Outreach Program by putting on the first of its annual February Ontario Heritage Day displays at a local mall. In 2003 it continued its Outreach Program by putting on an exhibit about the War of 1812 at the local library and staging a re-enactment event. Since then exhibits have been created on the subject of "The Role of the Blacksmith in the Early Economy of Upper Canada" and "The History of the Mississauga First Nation at Alderville". On two occasions the "barracks" has been included in the Doors Open Ontario event in Cobourg. The CMF has participated in Cobourg's popular July 1 Waterfront Festival a number of times with the purpose of informing visitors about the unique history of the area.

In its opening season, as Cobourg celebrated the 175th anniversary of its incorporation, the Heritage Centre concentrated on 1837 the year of incorporation. Many of the exhibits were in the form of panels with text and graphics. These are available for viewing on the CMF website. It is envisioned that much of what the Sifton-Cook Heritage Centre will display in the future will be of a digital nature using modern technology. Recent projects of this nature include an interactive timeline of Cobourg's history, which resides on the website and the ongoing cataloguing of books which relate to local history and are owned by members. A picture gallery of local mills is being gathered and posted on Flickr.

== Opportunities ==
The CMF has a strong and active volunteer board of directors, but there are always opportunities for other interested people to take an active part in the guiding of visitors, the development of exhibits, membership development and other areas.
