= Colwyn Bay Deanery =

Roman Catholic deanery in north Wales

The Colwyn Bay Deanery is a Roman Catholic deanery in the Diocese of Wrexham that covers several churches in Conwy.

The dean is centred at Our Lady Star of the Sea Church in Llandudno.

== Churches ==
- St Joseph, Colwyn Bay
- St Michael and All Angels, Conwy
- Our Lady Star of the Sea, Llandudno
- The Most Holy Family, Llandudno Junction
- St Mary of the Angels, Llanfairfechan – served from Llandudno Junction
- The Good Shepherd (Y Bugail Da), Llanrwst
- Sacred Heart, Old Colwyn

== Gallery ==
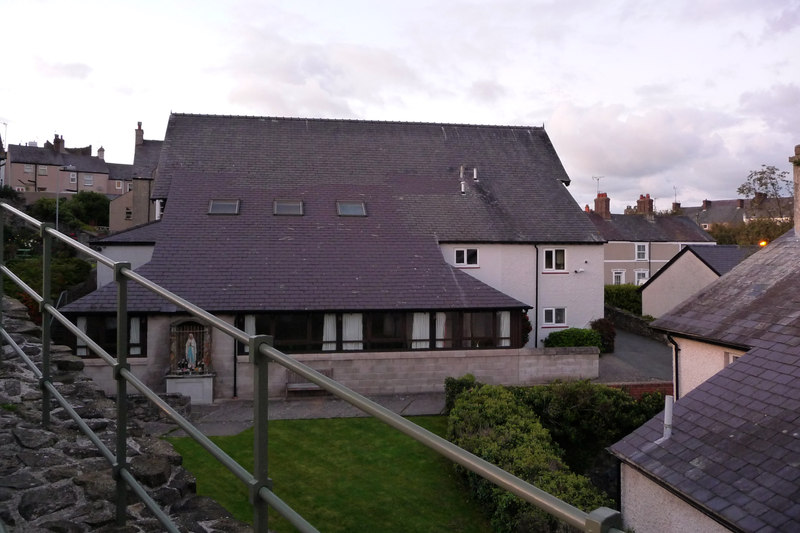
St Michael and All Angels, Conwy

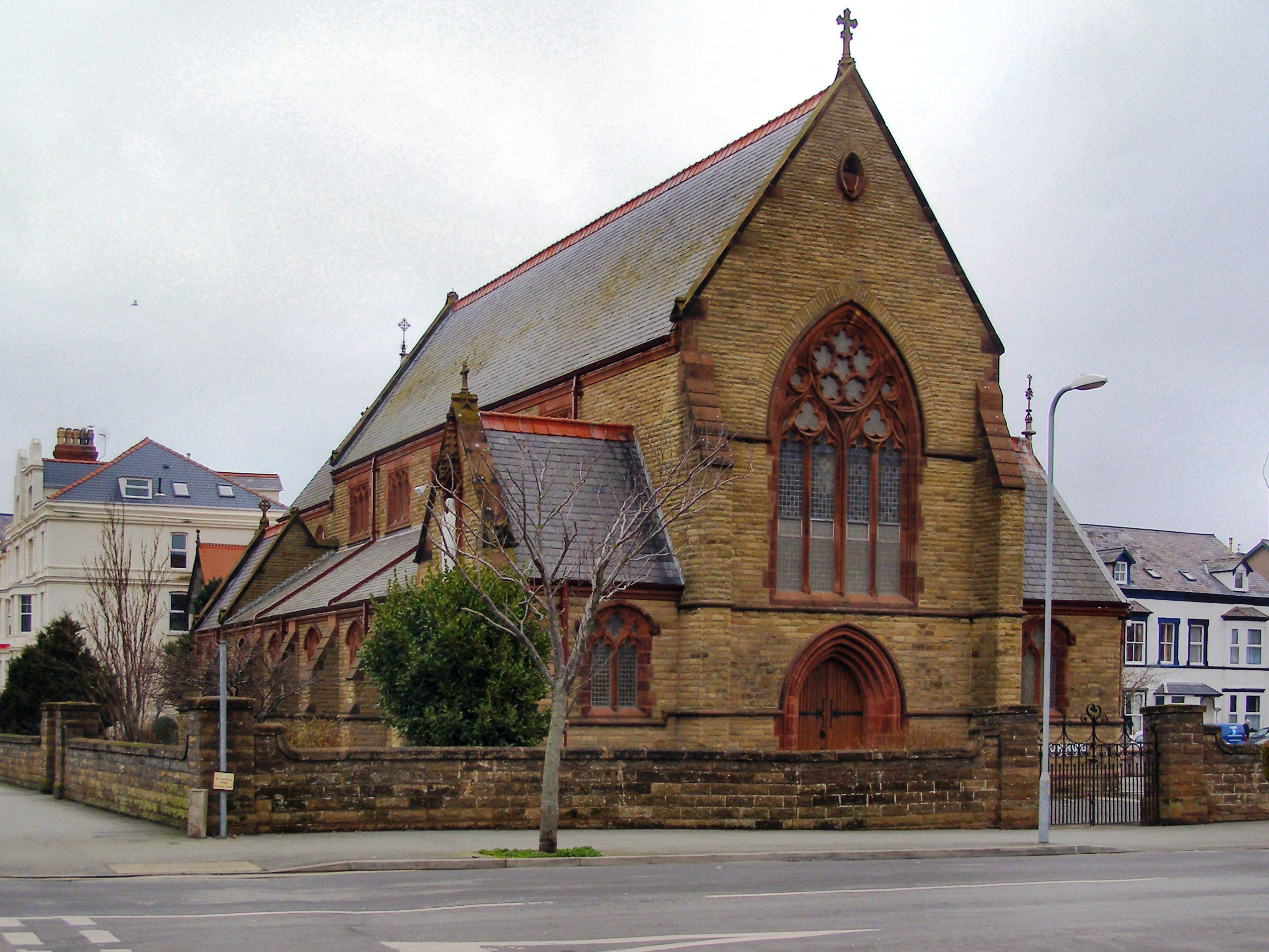
Our Lady Star of the Sea, Llandudno

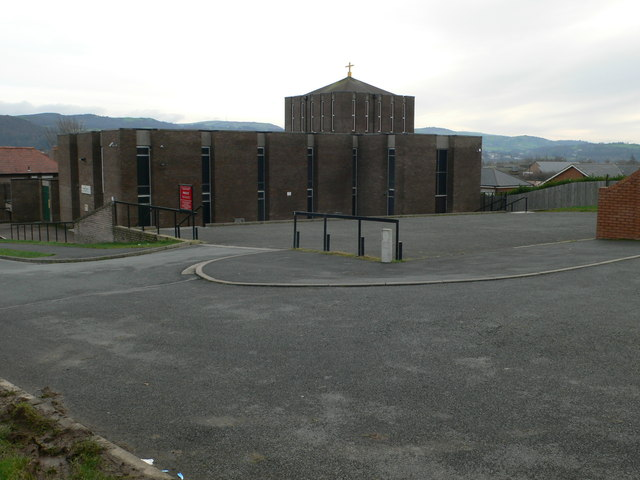
The Most Holy Family, Llandudno Junction

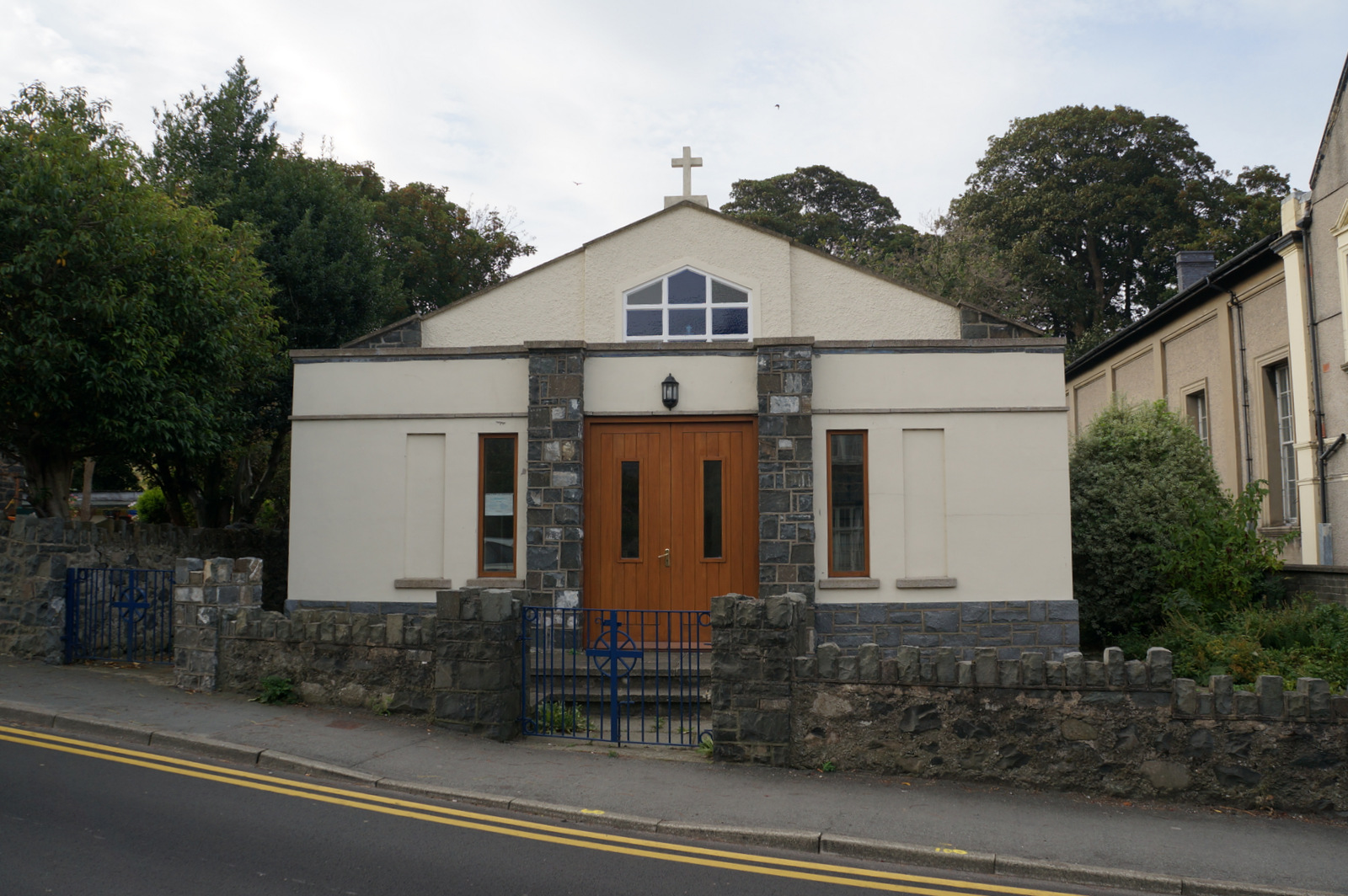
St Mary of the Angels, Llanfairfechan

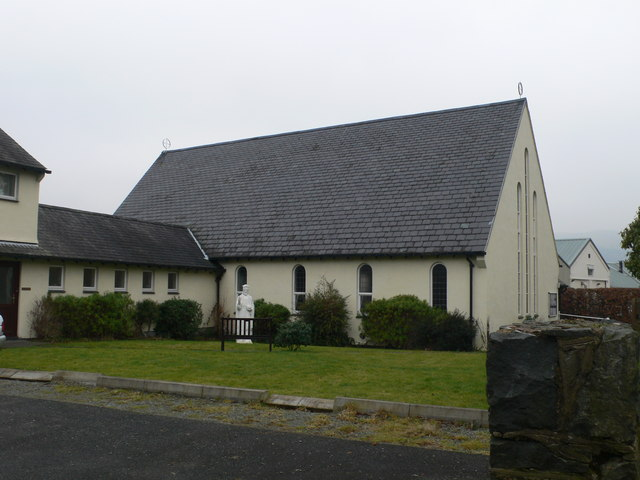
The Good Shepherd (Y Bugail Da), Llanrwst

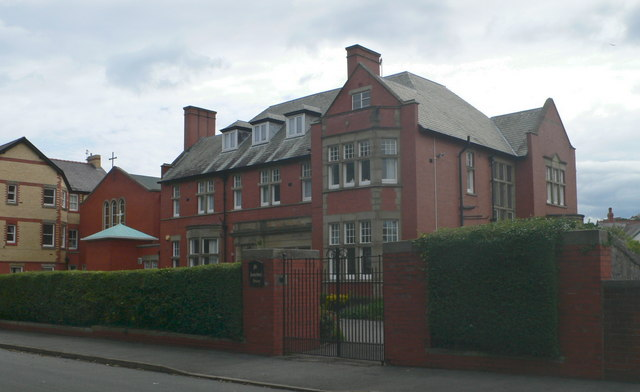
St Augustine's Priory, Old Colwyn, with Sacred Heart Church on the left
