= Llanelian Road =

Sport stadium in Conwy County Borough, Wales

Blue Turtle Arena
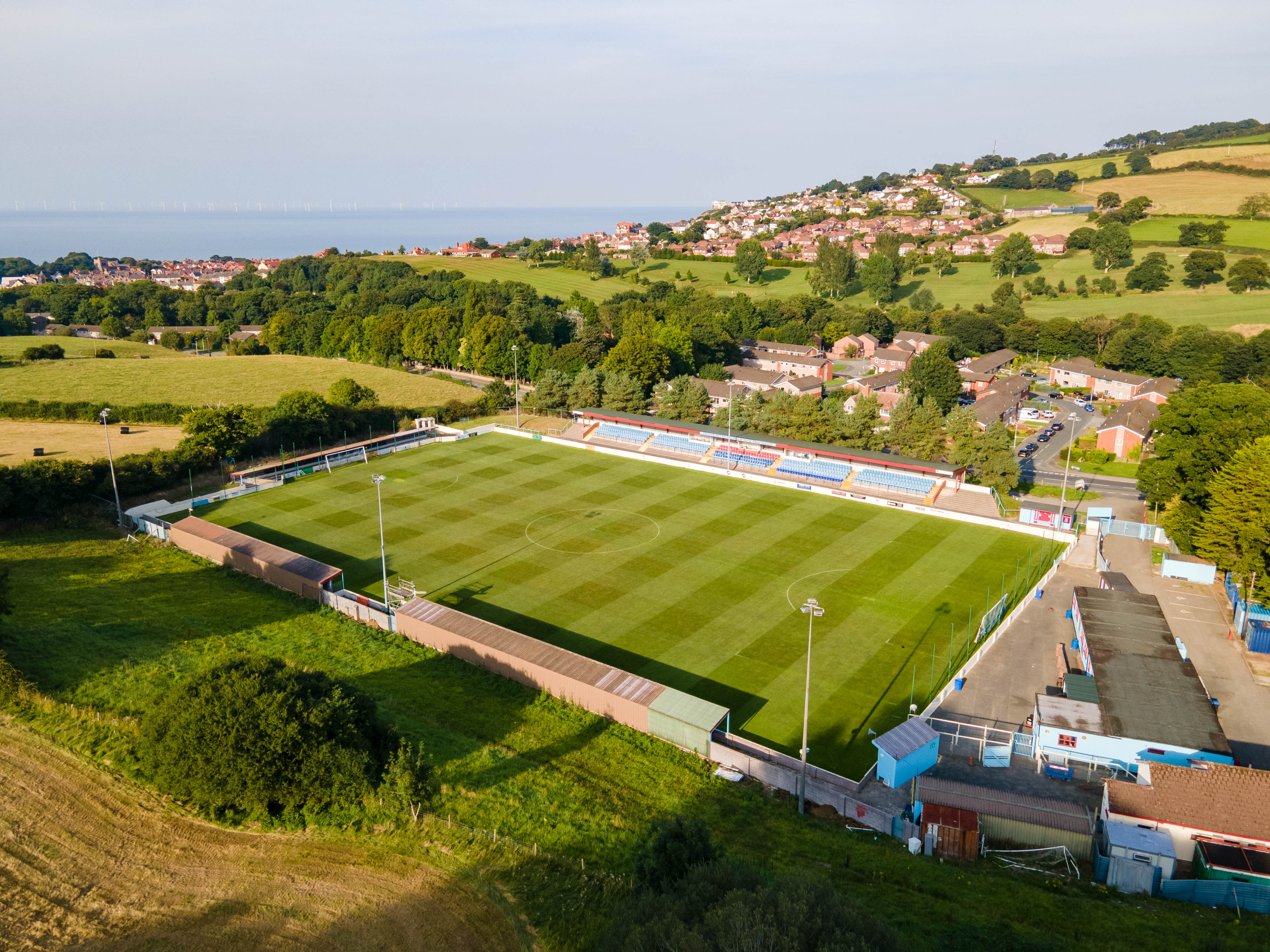
- The Llanelian Road stadium in 2021
- Interactive map of Blue Turtle Arena
- Former names: The Red Lion Foods Stadium (2011–2015)
- Location: Old Colwyn, Wales
- Coordinates: 53.2822°N 3.6997°W
- Operator: Colwyn Bay F.C.
- Surface: Grass

Construction
- Groundbreaking: 1983
- Opened: 1 September 1984

Tenant
- Colwyn Bay F.C. (1984-1992) (1994-present) Colwyn Bay YMCA (1992-2000)

Llanelian Road (Welsh: Ffordd Llanelian), also known as the Blue Turtle Arena for sponsorship purposes, is a multi-use stadium in Old Colwyn, North Wales. It is currently used mostly for football matches and is the home ground of Colwyn Bay F.C. of the Cymru Premier.

The stadium was built in 1984 on part of the Parciau farm estate after the club moved from their former home in Eirias Park due to the building of the A55 dual carriageway through Colwyn Bay. Colwyn Bay won their first game at Llanelian Road, beating Lytham 1–0 in an FA Cup preliminary round tie in September 1984.

A shelter was erected at the town end of the ground in 1985 and is more commonly known as the Shed End. Two further covered stands were erected by the end of the decade. Floodlights were first installed at the ground in 1990 and were first switched on for a friendly match against Liverpool. The grass bank on the Llanelian Road side of the ground was terraced during the summer of 1998 following a successful fundraising appeal by the club's Supporters Club.

Colwyn Bay were forced to play away from Llanelian Road for two seasons after the club refused to join the newly formed League of Wales in 1992. The club played for a season in Northwich and a further season at Ellesmere Port Stadium in Ellesmere Port. Colwyn Bay YMCA were formed in 1992 and played at Llanelian Road during the club's time in exile. The club returned to Llanelian Road when they and fellow exiles Newport County and Caernarfon Town secured a High Court injunction in the summer of 1994. A crowd of over 1,600 saw Bay's first competitive match in two years at Llanelian Road, a 1–0 defeat to Marine in the Northern Premier League Premier Division.

During Colwyn Bay's period in exile Colwyn Bay YMCA was formed and played at Llanelian Road between 1992 and 2000.

Llanelian Road hosted two games in the 2008 semi-professional Four Nations Tournament with England facing Gibraltar and Scotland Semi-Pro during May of that year.

Over 2,000 fans were in attendance when Colwyn Bay F.C. beat FC United 1–0 in the 2010–11 season Northern Premier League Premier Division final to earn promotion to the Conference North.

The club's promotion to the Conference North in 2011 also resulted in the club having to make improvements or face relegation. The club were linked with a return to Eirias Stadium because of Conference ground regulations and then manager Dave Challinor was impressed with the facilities but the club remained at Llanelian Road. Major changes saw a new covered stand built over the Llanelian Road terrace, seating 500 and including press facilities and hospitality boxes with new floodlights erected.

In September 2022 the club submitted plans for a new 1.000 seater stand to replace two covered terraced stands on the west side of the ground as well as additional parking. Permission was granted by Conwy County Borough Council in October 2022. Work on the new stand commenced in January 2023.

Colwyn Bay F.C. previously played on three different grounds at Eirias Park during their history. The first pitch in the park was located on land that his now occupied by Eirias High School and later they moved to a pitch where they remained until the early 1980s, when the land was required to dump soil following construction of the A55. The Arena was a temporary home during the early 1980s prior to the club's move to Llanelian Road in 1984.

Under a current sponsorship deal the commenced on 1 June 2025 the ground is also known as the Blue Turtle Arena, and was also previously known as the 4 Crosses Arena and before that the Red Lion Foods Stadium.
