= List of new churches by John Douglas =

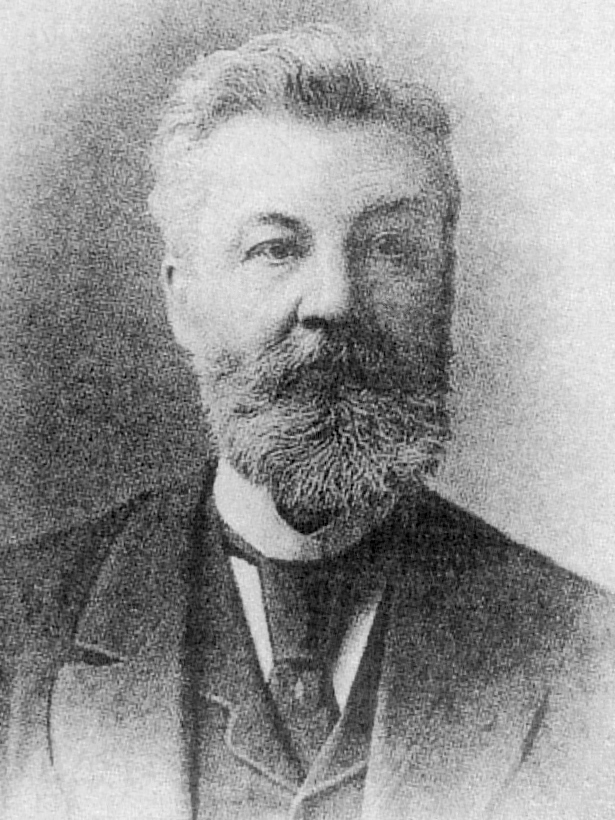
John Douglas in late middle age

John Douglas (1830–1911) was an English architect based in Chester, Cheshire. His output included new churches, alterations to and restoration of existing churches, church furnishings, new houses and alterations to existing houses, and a variety of other buildings, including shops, banks, offices, schools, memorials and public buildings. Perhaps his best-known design is that for the Eastgate Clock in Chester. His architectural styles were eclectic, but as he worked during the period of the Gothic Revival much of his output incorporates elements of the English Gothic style. He was also influenced by architectural styles from the mainland of Europe, and frequently included elements of French, German, and Netherlandish architecture. Douglas is probably best remembered for his incorporation of vernacular elements in his buildings, in particular half-timbering, in which he was influenced by the black-and-white revival in Chester. Other vernacular elements he employed included tile-hanging, pargeting, and the use of decorative brick in diapering and the design of tall chimney stacks. Of particular importance is Douglas' use of joinery and highly detailed wood carving.

John Douglas was born in the Cheshire village of Sandiway and was articled to the Lancaster architect E. G. Paley, later becoming his chief assistant. He established an office in Chester in either 1855 or 1860, from where he practised throughout his career. Initially he ran the office himself but in 1884 he appointed his assistant, Daniel Porter Fordham, as a partner. When Fordham retired in 1897, he was succeeded by Charles Howard Minshull. In 1909 this partnership was dissolved and Douglas ran the office alone until his death in 1911. As his office was in Chester, most of his works were in Cheshire and North Wales, although some were further afield, in Lancashire, Staffordshire, Warwickshire, and Scotland.

From an early stage in his career, Douglas attracted commissions from wealthy and powerful patrons, the first of which came from Hugh Cholmondeley, 2nd Baron Delamere. His most important patrons were the Grosvenor family of Eaton Hall, namely Richard Grosvenor, 2nd Marquess of Westminster, Hugh Grosvenor, 1st Duke of Westminster, and Hugh Grosvenor, 2nd Duke of Westminster. Douglas designed a large number and variety of buildings in the family's Eaton Hall estate and the surrounding villages. Other important patrons were William Molyneux, 4th Earl of Sefton, Rowland Egerton-Warburton of Arley Hall, George Cholmondeley, 5th Marquess of Cholmondeley, and Francis Egerton, 3rd Earl of Ellesmere. Later in his career Douglas carried out commissions for W. E. Gladstone and his family, and for W. H.Lever.

Most of Douglas' new churches have been recognised as listed buildings. In England and Wales a Grade I listed building is one "of exceptional interest, sometimes considered to be internationally important", Grade II* consists of "particularly important buildings of more than special interest", and in Grade II are buildings which "are nationally important and of special interest". In Scotland, Category A contains "buildings of national or international importance, either architectural or historic, or fine little-altered examples of some particular period, style or building type", Category B consists of "buildings of regional or more than local importance, or major examples of some particular period, style or building type which may have been altered", and in Category C are "buildings of local importance, lesser examples of any period, style, or building type, as originally constructed or moderately altered; and simple traditional buildings which group well with others in categories A and B".

This list includes the 40 new churches designed by Douglas that were built. The details are taken from the Catalogue of Works in the biography by Edward Hubbard. Churches attributed to Douglas by Hubbard on stylistic grounds together with evidence of a local association are included, even though they are not confirmed by other reliable evidence. Where this is the case, it is stated in the Notes column. Unexecuted schemes are not included.

== Key ==
Grade	Criteria
Grade I	Buildings of exceptional interest, sometimes considered to be internationally important.
Grade II*	Particularly important buildings of more than special interest.
Grade II	Buildings of national importance and special interest.
Category (Scotland)	Criteria
B	Buildings of special architectural or historic interest which are major examples of a particular period, style or building type.
"—" denotes a work that is not graded.

== New churches ==
Name	Location	Photograph	Date	Notes	Grade
St John the Evangelist's Church	Over, Winsford, Cheshire; 53.1922°N 2.5481°W	The west end, with a rose window, and the steeple of a Gothic style church, with a clock face; gravestones in the foreground and a leafless tree to the left	1860–63	This was Douglas' first church and was designed as a memorial to the first wife of the 2nd Baron Delamere. It is in Gothic Revival style.	II
Congregational Chapel	Over, Winsford, Cheshire; 53.1883°N 2.5399°W	A chapel with rows of red and white bricks; the entrance porch has three arches and there are three windows above	1865	This church is built in polychromatic brick with some red sandstone dressings. Pevsner describes it as being "very ugly" while Hubbard describes it as being "experimental" and presenting "an astonishing sight". It is now a United Reformed church.	II
St John the Baptist's Church	Aldford, Cheshire; 53.1290°N 2.8698°W	A sandstone church with, on the left a tower with a spire and a stair turret, and on the right the body of the church with a clerestory	1. 1865–66; 2. c.1872–76 3. 1902	St John's was the first church commissioned by the Grosvenor family 1. A new church was built on the site of an earlier church.: 2. Additions were made including a spire and a reredos.; 3. A vestry was converted into a chapel and another vestry was added.	II
St Bartholomew's Church	Sealand, Flintshire; 53.2128°N 2.9709°W	A photograph of a grey-bricked, many-windowed church with a slanted roof in a grassy field surrounded by green trees all under a bright sky	1865–67	This is a small church designed for the River Dee Company in Early Decorated style. Douglas paid for the stained glass by Hardman & Co. in the east window.	II
St Ann's Church	Warrington, Cheshire; 53.3967°N 2.5947°W	A church tower topped with a pyramidal spire and a round stair turret behind; to the right is an apse with buttresses; a car and a white van pass in front	1868–69	The church is in bold High Victorian style with a broad aisleless nave. It is closed for worship and has been used as an indoor climbing centre since 1996.	II*
St Paul's Church	Helsby, Cheshire; 53.2775°N 2.7612°W	Three-quarter view of a church with a gabled porch to the left and a small spire above it	1. 1868–70; 2. 1909	1. This is a small church with a western bell-turret in the form of a flèche.; 2. A south aisle was added.	II
St John the Baptist's Church	Hartford, Cheshire; 53.2458°N 2.5441°W	A substantial church from the northwest with a clerestory, chancel to the left, protruding vestry and aisle, and a castellated tower to the right	1. 1873–75; 2. 1885–87	1. A new church was built on the site of an older church.; 2. A tower was added at the west end.	II
St Paul's Church	Marston, Cheshire; 53.275°N 2.496°W	—	1874	This was a small church with much moulded brick, lancet windows, a small west tower and spire. It has been demolished.	—
Presbyterian Chapel	Rossett, Wrexham County Borough; 53.1076°N 2.9524°W		1875	This is a church with lancet windows, a timber porch and a flèche.	—
Christ Church	Gloucester Street, Chester, Cheshire; 53.1969°N 2.8885°W	A church without tower or steeple seen from the side with clerestory; a porch and the aisle protrude; in front is a road with parked vehicles	1. 1876; 2. 1893; 3. 1897; 4. 1898; 5. 1900	1. A new church was built to replace a previous one on the site.; 2–5. During these years a new sanctuary was added, then the porch, the pulpit and the southeast chapel. Later the vestry and organ chamber were added, work was done on the chancel, and the nave was completed.	II
St Stephen's Church	Moulton, Cheshire; 53.2227°N 2.5168°W	The west end of the church showing the porch and small tower; part of a gatepost intrudes on the right	1876–77	The exterior of this church is built in stone while the interior is in two kinds of brick. It has a green slate roof and a lead spire.	II
St Barnabas' Mission Church and Curate's House	Sibell Street, Chester, Cheshire; 53.1967°N 2.8828°W		1877	The church was built a mission church with an adjacent house for the curate, It is now used as offices.	II
Church of St Mary the Virgin	Halkyn, Flintshire; 53.2316°N 3.1862°W	A large broad church seen from the northwest showing a large chancel, the nave, a porch and a broad castellated tower beyond the chancel; a wall in the foreground	1877–88	The church was built for the 1st Duke of Westminster. Hubbard considers it to be "one of the best Victorian churches in Clwyd" which "sets the tone for virtually all his [Douglas'] subsequent churches".	I
St Michael's Church	Altcar, Lancashire; 53.5509°N 3.0283°W	A small black and white half-timbered church showing the nave with a porch, a small chancel beyond and a small spire on the nearside of the roof; some gravestones visible in the churchyard.	1878–79	This church was designed for the 4th Earl of Sefton and is unique in Douglas' output in being entirely half-timbered. In the Buildings of England series it is described as "an utterly charming church".	II*
Welsh Church of St John the Evangelist	Mold, Flintshire; 53.1686°N 3.1410°W		1878–79	This church is broad without aisles but is now redundant. It has been divided and is used as a church hall.	II
Grosvenor Park Baptist Chapel	Grosvenor Road, Chester, Cheshire; 53.19169°N 2.88192°W	A red brick chapel with stone dressings with a small spire in the foreground and three small noticeboards	1879–80	This was built in association with a terrace of houses in the same road. It was originally a Baptist chapel but is now known as Zion Tabernacle.	II
St Chad's Church	Hopwas, Staffordshire; 52.6433°N 1.7418°W		1881	The church was built for Rev W. MacGregor. It is in brick and half-timber with a timber-framed porch and has an octagonal flèche.	II
St Mary's Church	Pulford, Cheshire; 53.1224°N 2.9348°W	A church with a red roof, and red body with yellow bands, the tower is to the right with a spire, four pinnacles and a clock face; in front is a wall and a surfaced car park	1881–84	The church was built for the 1st Duke of Westminster in red sandstone with bands of lighter stone. It is cruciform in plan with a northwest tower which incorporates the porch.	II*
St Werburgh's New Church	Warburton, Greater Manchester; 53.3984°N 2.4454°W	A castellated tower with the nave of the church to the right; a tree is to the left and the churchyard is grassed	1. 1882–85; 2. 1899	1. This was a new church built for Rowland Egerton-Warburton in sandstone to replace St Werburgh's Old Church but on a different site.; 2. The chancel stalls were replaced.	II
Holywell Workhouse Chapel	Holywell, Flintshire; 53.2663°N 3.2168°W	The end of a chapel with five windows and a small spire; in front is a bush and a wall	1883–84	A chapel with a shingled flèche for the workhouse which later became Lluesty Hospital.	II
Chapel of the Good Shepherd	Carlett Park, Eastham, Merseyside; 53.3230°N 2.9593°W	A photograph of a brown building with a sloped roof and a tower protruding from the right portion of the roof all surrounded by green grass	1884–85	This was a family chapel for Rev W. E. Torr who lived at the manor house. It is a simple building in stone with lancet windows and a northwest turret.	II
St Deiniol's Church	Criccieth, Gwynedd; 52.9202°N 4.2310°W		1884–87	This was a cruciform church with a short spire. It closed in 1988 and has been converted into residential flats.	—
Christ Church	Rossett, Wrexham County Borough; 53.1078°N 2.9490°W	A cruciform church with a broad central tower; this is crenellated and has prominent buttresses; in front is a lych gate and a white railing; in the foreground is a lamppost and a road with traffic islands	1886–92	This is a church built to replace an earlier church in the site. It is cruciform in plan and built in stone with a green slate roof. It was planned in 1886 but not built until 1891–92.	II
St Paul's Church	Colwyn Bay, Conwy County Borough; 53.2939°N 3.7265°W	A church seen from the southeast, in light stone with darker bands; the tower is just visible; in front of the church are two parked cars	1. 1887–88; 2. 1894–95; 3. 1910–11	The church was built in three stages.: 1. In the first stage the nave was built.; 2. The chancel was built.; 3. The tower was added.	II*
St Andrew's Church	West Kirby, Merseyside; 53.3761°N 3.1858°W		1. 1889–91; 2. 1907	The church was built in two stages: 1. The nave was built.; 2. The church was completed.	II
St John's Church	Barmouth, Gwynedd; 52.7233°N 4.0548°W	A church seen from the south at a distance with a tree-covered rocky hillside beyond; the church is large with a clerestory, a castellated tower with a small pyramidal spire and clock faces on the two visible sides	1889–95	This church was built for Mrs. F. S. Perrins and is set on a hillside overlooking the town. During its construction the tower collapsed and had to be rebuilt.	II*
St James' Church	Haydock, Merseyside; 53.4678°N 2.6595°W		c. 1891–92	The church incorporated part of the previous church as a Lady chapel. It was built with timber framing to give protection against possible mining subsidence.	—
St Wenefrede's Church	Bickley, Cheshire; 53.0364°N 2.6922°W	A tower with a broach spire partly obscured by bushes with a lych gate to the right and a wall and road in the foreground	1892	The church was built for the 4th Marquess of Cholmondeley in sandstone with a roof of green slates and terracotta ridge tiles. Inside the church is a hammerbeam roof.	II
St David's Welsh Church	Rhosllannerchrugog, Wrexham County Borough; 53.0115°N 3.0569°W		1892–93	Douglas & Fordham designed a church with a nave and a north aisle. The chancel was added later. It was intended to have a northeast steeple, but this was never built.	—
All Saints Church	Higher Kinnerton, Flintshire; 53.1439°N 3.0044°W	A lych gate with a hedge on each side; behind is the end of a polygonal apse with a pointed roof and beyond that a tower with a broach spire	1893	The church has a central spire, and another smaller spire above the chancel.	—
Christ Church	Bryn-y-Maen, Colwyn Bay, Conwy County Borough; 53.2695°N 3.7465°W	A low cruciform pale-coloured church seen from the southeast with the chancel prominent, beyond which is a broad castellated tower; in the foreground is the trunk of a tree standing in a grassed area	1896–99	The church was built in memory of Eleanor Frost's husband, Charles, in a small village to the south of Colwyn Bay. It is known locally as the "Cathedral of the Hills".	II*
Congregational Church	Great Crosby, Merseyside; 53.4914°N 3.0250°W		1897–98	The church is built in sandstone with green slate roofs. Originally a Congregational church, it is now a United Reformed Church.	II
St John the Evangelist's Church	Weston, Runcorn, Cheshire; 53.3190°N 2.73885°W	A church seen from the southwest with a low broach spire, the chancel higher than the nave and the porch protruding from the south; in front is a wall, a notice board and a flagpole; to the left a house	1. 1897–98; 2. 1900	It is known as the "choirboys' church", because the choirboys wrote thousands of letters to raise money for it.: 1. The church was built.; 2. The tower was added.	II*
All Saints Church	Deganwy, Conwy County Borough; 53.2941°N 3.8270°W	A church seen from the south with the edge of a hillside beyond; it has a clerestory and, to the left a tower with a short spire; in front is a wall with two gates and the whole is framed by trees on each side	1897–99	This is a memorial church built for Lady Augusta Mostyn on a site overlooking the Conwy estuary. It has a clerestory, a chancel higher than the nave and a west tower.	II*
St Ethelwold's Church	Shotton, Flintshire; 53.2096°N 3.0346°W		1898–1902	Although the church was partly financed by W. E. Gladstone, its building did not start until after his death.	II
St John the Baptist's Church	Old Colwyn, Conwy County Borough; 53.2906°N 3.6974°W		1. 1899–1903; 2. 1912	The church was built for the English-speaking community of Colwyn Bay.: 1. The church was built.; 2. The tower was added (after Douglas' death).	II*
St David's Welsh Church	Colwyn Bay, Conwy County Borough; 53.2937°N 3.7268°W		1902–03	The church was built close to St Paul's Church to serve the Welsh-speaking community.	II
St John the Evangelist's Church	Sandiway, Cheshire; 53.2359°N 2.5921°W	A church see from the south with a castellated tower at the left, roses and a grassed area in the foreground and trees to the left and beyond	1. 1902–03; 2. Undated	1. The church was built on land owned by Douglas who also paid for the chancel and lych gate.; 2. The tower was added after Douglas' death.	II
All Saints Church	Lockerbie, Dumfries and Galloway; 55.124°N 3.361°W	A small church with a tower and broach spire to the left, trees are to the left and overlapping to the front and autumn leaves lie on the grassed area in the foreground	1903	This is Douglas' only Scottish Episcopal Church. It is built in ashlar stone with a red tile roof and has a west tower with a broach spire.	B
Congregational Church	Hoylake, Merseyside; 53.3900°N 3.1805°W		1905–06	Built in brick with sandstone dressings, it is in Perpendicular style. It originally had a spire, but this sustained war damage, and has not been replaced.	II
St Matthew's Church	Saltney, Flintshire; 53.183°N 2.947°W	A small church in red brick with a grey roof seen from the side; protruding is a gabled wing with a chimney; the glass in the lancet windows is broken; bushes are in the foreground and leafless trees to the sides	1910–11	This was a mission church to St Mark's Church, Saltney. It was closed in 2000 and destroyed by fire in 2008.	—

== See also ==
- List of church restorations, amendments and furniture by John Douglas
- List of houses and associated buildings by John Douglas
- List of non-ecclesiastical and non-residential works by John Douglas
