= Colwyn Bay Town Hall =

Municipal Building in Colwyn Bay, Wales

- Neuadd y Dref Bae Colwyn (Welsh)
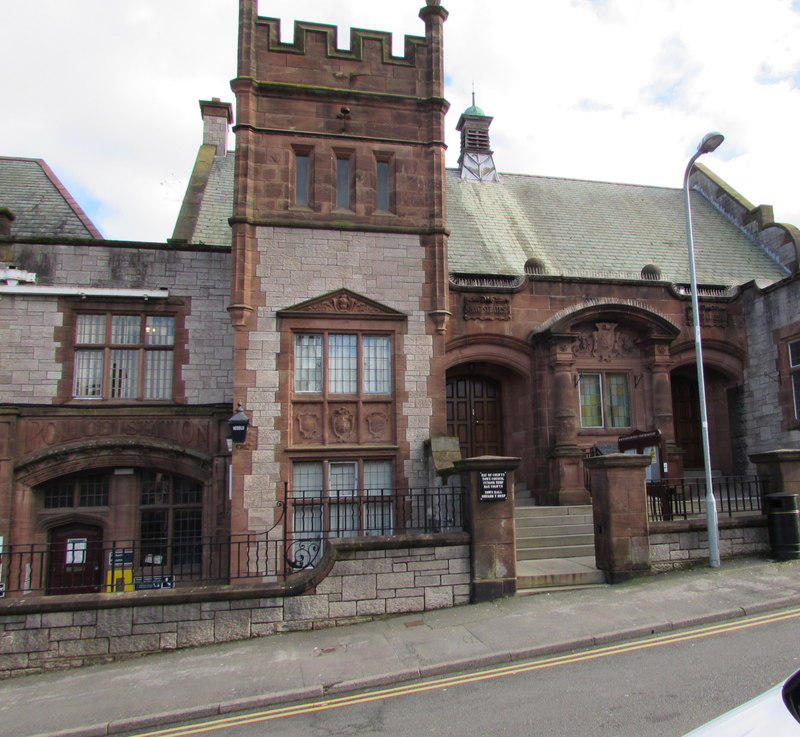
- The building in February 2016

- Shown in Conwy
- 53.2934°N 3.7261°W
- Location: Rhiw Road, Colwyn Bay

History
- Built: 1907

Site notes
- Architect: Walter Wiles
- Architectural style: Edwardian style

Listed Building – Grade II
- Official name: Police Station and Magistrates Court
- Designated: 25 July 1994
- Reference no.: 14707

Colwyn Bay Town Hall (Welsh: Neuadd y Dref Bae Colwyn) is a municipal building located on Rhiw Road in Colwyn Bay in Conwy County Borough in Wales. The structure was completed in 1907 as a magistrates' court. Since the 1990s it has served as the headquarters of Bay of Colwyn Town Council. It is a Grade II listed building.

== History ==
In the 19th century, local court hearings took place in Conwy, 6 miles (9.7 km) away. Much of the early town of Colwyn Bay was developed from 1875 onwards on plots sold by the Pwllycrochan Estate, which retained some control over the developing town. In 1892, a Municipal Building was completed on Station Road, forming the end of a row of shops. It acted as the estate office for the Pwllycrochan Estate and also included as a small police station and magistrates' court. The Colwyn Bay and Colwyn Urban District Council also had its offices in the building in 1901.

The town's politicians were keen to encourage Denbighshire County Council to hold some of its meetings in Colwyn Bay, but the Municipal Building did not have a suitable council chamber. From 1900, the County Council agreed to hold one of its quarterly meetings each year in Colwyn Bay, but had to use the Public Hall on Abergele Road (now Theatr Colwyn) for such meetings for the first few years.

In 1904, the urban district council converted a pair of houses at the corner of Conway Road and Coed Pella Road to become its offices, renaming the building Town Hall. The continuing limitations of the Municipal Building led to the magistrates and the county council also seeking new premises. They decided to build a new dedicated police station and magistrates' court, with a room large enough to accommodate county council meetings. The site they selected was open ground opposite St Paul's Church on Rhiw Road.

Construction of the building started on 1905. It was designed by Walter Wiles, the Denbighshire county architect, in the Edwardian style and completed in 1907. It originally housed the police station on the left, with a house for the Chief Superintendent of Police, and the magistrates' court on the right. The building was initially called the County Buildings, and the county council held its first meeting there in August 1908.

The old Town Hall at the corner of Coed Pella Road and Conway Road was demolished shortly after the Colwyn Bay Borough Council (successor to the urban district council) moved its headquarters to the Civic Centre (formerly Glan-y-Don Hall) in 1964. (Co-incidentally, a new municipal building, Coed Pella, was built in 2018 on the site of the pre-1964 Town Hall, as offices for the modern Conwy County Borough Council.)

Following local government re-organisation in 1996, a new community council, Bay of Colwyn Town Council, was established. The magistrates' court closed on 31 December 1996, and the new town council moved into the vacant building, renaming it Town Hall.

The name plate from the LMS Rebuilt Patriot Class steam locomotive, Colwyn Bay, which was built in 1933 and withdrawn from service in 1963, has since been installed on the wall inside the building.

== Architecture ==
The building is constructed of white stone, with dressings in red sandstone, and green slate roofs. The building is two storeys high, and the police station is five bays wide. There is a porch with an arched canopy, and windows with mullions and transoms. To its right is a tower, set slightly further forward, and the single-storey former magistrates' court to its right. It is three bays wide, with arched doorways in the end bays, and a mullioned window below a pediment with a coat of arms supported by pilasters. To its right is a flat-roofed anteroom with lancet windows. It was grade II listed in 1994.
