= Bay of Colwyn Town Council =

Community council in Conwy, Wales

Bay of Colwyn Town Council Cyngor Tref Bae Colwyn

Type
- Type: Town council

Leadership
- Mayor: Jeff Pearson (2017/18)
- Seats: 24

Meeting place
- Colwyn Bay Town Hall, Rhiw Road, Colwyn Bay

Website
- www.colwyn-tc.gov.uk

Bay of Colwyn Town Council is an elected community council serving the town of Colwyn Bay in North Wales, and neighbouring communities of Rhos-on-Sea and Old Colwyn.

== Background ==
Bay of Colwyn Town Council was formed in 1996 following the dissolution of Colwyn Borough Council. The Council covers the communities of Colwyn Bay (Glyn and Rhiw electoral wards), Old Colwyn (Colwyn and Eirias wards) and Rhos-on-Sea (Dinarth and Rhos wards). Each ward elects four town councillors, making a total of 24 councillors. The Council elects a Chairman every year in May, the Chairman also holds the post of Town Mayor.

The town council has been involved since 2014 in a battle with the county council to save and restore the Grade II-listed Colwyn Bay pier. Although the town council had pledged £25,000 in 2013 to redevelop the pier (which had been closed since 2008), Conwy County Borough Council voted to de-list and demolish the structure. The town council expressed their anger that they had not been consulted about this.

In January 2018 the council made the UK news when Conservative Town Mayor, Jeff Pearson, called for residents to stop recycling their rubbish, in protest at Conwy County Borough Council's plans to reduce the number of refuse collections to 12 per year.
