= Ysgol Bryn Elian =

Secondary comprehensive school in Conwy County Borough, Wales

Location
- Windsor Drive; Old Colwyn, Conwy, LL29 8HU Conwy; Wales; 53°17′08″N 3°42′17″W

Information
- Motto: Llwyddiant i Bawb (Success for all)
- Established: 1974; 52 years ago
- Department for Education URN: 401690 Tables
- Headteacher: Lindsey Hastings
- Staff: 51
- Gender: Boys and Girls
- Age: 11 to 18/19
- Enrolment: 993 (2023)
- Houses: Glaslyn (Blue) Llydaw (Red) Idwal (Yellow) Dulyn (Green) Cwellyn (Purple)
- Colours: (School Uniform) Blue; Light and Dark
- Website: www.brynelian.conwy.sch.uk

Ysgol Bryn Elian is an 11–18 English-medium co-educational comprehensive school on Windsor Drive in Old Colwyn. Along with Eirias High School and Coleg Llandrillo (which is sixth-form-level only) it serves the state secondary education sector in the Colwyn Bay area. The school has been in existence since the 1970s, when it was initially created as a secondary modern school to accept those unable to get into the town's grammar school, Eirias High School. In the mid-seventies, the Secretary of State for Education ordered both schools to become comprehensives.

== History ==
Ysgol Bryn Elian's history prior to 1988 was largely uneventful, in that its performance was considered satisfactory to good in the inspections by Estyn. In 1988, following the retirement of the incumbent headteacher and the secondment of a Deputy, the school underwent significant change, however, occasioned, in large part, by the appointment of a new head teacher (James Whippe) with significant inner-city education experience, gained in both London and Liverpool, and a temporary, later to be made permanent, deputy.

== Today ==
The School recently won the Wales Quality Award "Prize for Learning". To date they are the only school in Wales to do so. The school has played host to the band the Ordinary Boys on the first day of BBC Radio 1's Star Pupil competition in early 2007 and has also seen the likes of Lil' Chris and European Gold and Olympic Silver Medallist, Campbell Walsh making appearances.

The school also embarks on a great deal of charity work. They notably raised money in 2010 to develop a school in Madagascar. Though they had an eventual target of £11,000, they raised over £14,000.

They recently received 85% passed A Level results. This led to a place alongside Ysgol Y Creuddyn, Ysgol Dyffryn Conwy and Ysgol Aberconwy in Band 2, in the Conwy Round of best schools in North Wales.

In the 2012 A-Level Results 93% passed In the 2013 A-Level results, all first choice universities were gained. The 2013 GCSE results were 97% 5 A*-C.

Its feeder schools are: Ysgol Cynfran (Llysfaen) Ysgol Hen Golwyn (Old Colwyn) Ysgol Llanddulas (Llanddulas) Ysgol Tan Y Marian (Peulwys) Ysgol Y Plas (Llanelian)
