= St David's Welsh Church, Colwyn Bay =

Coordinates: 53.2937°N 3.7268°W

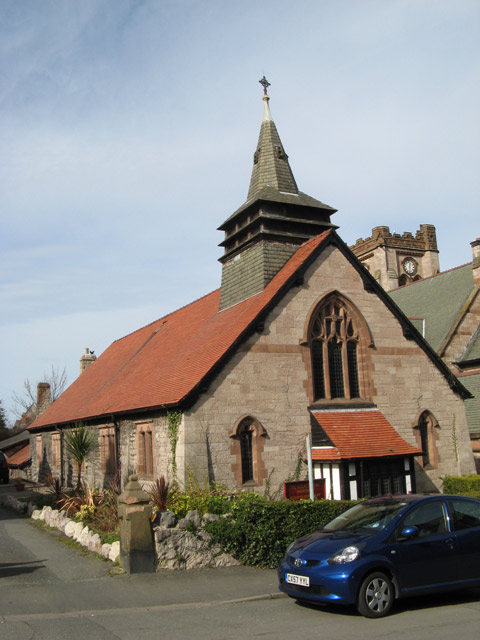
- St David's Welsh Church, Colwyn Bay
- OS grid reference: SH 850 788
- Location: Rhiw Road, Colwyn Bay, Conwy County Borough
- Country: Wales
- Denomination: Anglican
- Website: Colwyn Bay Parish

History
- Dedication: Saint David

Architecture
- Functional status: Active
- Heritage designation: Grade II
- Designated: 25 July 1994
- Architect: Douglas and Minshull
- Architectural type: Church
- Style: Gothic Revival
- Groundbreaking: 1902
- Completed: 1903

Administration
- Province: Wales
- Diocese: St Asaph
- Archdeaconry: St Asaph
- Deanery: Rhos
- Parish: Colwyn Bay with Bryn-Y-Maen

Clergy
- Vicar: Rev'd Christine Owen

St David's Welsh Church, Colwyn Bay (Eglwys Dewi Sant) is in Rhiw Road, Colwyn Bay, Conwy County Borough, Wales. It is an Anglican church in the parish of Colwyn Bay with Bryn-Y-Maen, the deanery of Rhos, the archdeaconry of St Asaph, and the diocese of St Asaph. The church is situated behind St Paul's Church and is a Grade II listed building.

St David's Church was built in 1902–03 and designed by the Chester firm of architects Douglas and Minshull. It is a small church with an apsidal sanctuary. The west window is Perpendicular in style. Rising from the roof is a square bellcote with a pyramidal roof on which is an octagonal spirelet. Internally, the screen was made by a local blacksmith, David Jones.

As its name suggests, the services held in the church are in Welsh.

== See also ==
- List of new churches by John Douglas
