= St Paul's Church, Marston =

Church in Cheshire, England

Coordinates: 53°16′N 2°30′W

St Paul's Church was in the village of Marston, Cheshire, England.

The church was built in 1874 and designed by the Chester architect John Douglas. It was a small church with lancet windows and a "miniature" spire at the west end with a spire. The church has also been demolished.

It is the only new church designed by John Douglas to have been demolished, other than St Matthew's Church, Saltney which was destroyed by fire in 2008.

== See also ==
- List of new churches by John Douglas

== Bibliography ==
- Hubbard, Edward (1991). The Work of John Douglas. London: The Victorian Society. ISBN 0-901657-16-6.
