= Colwyn Bay =

Town in Conwy County Borough, Wales

Colwyn Bay: Welsh: Bae Colwyn
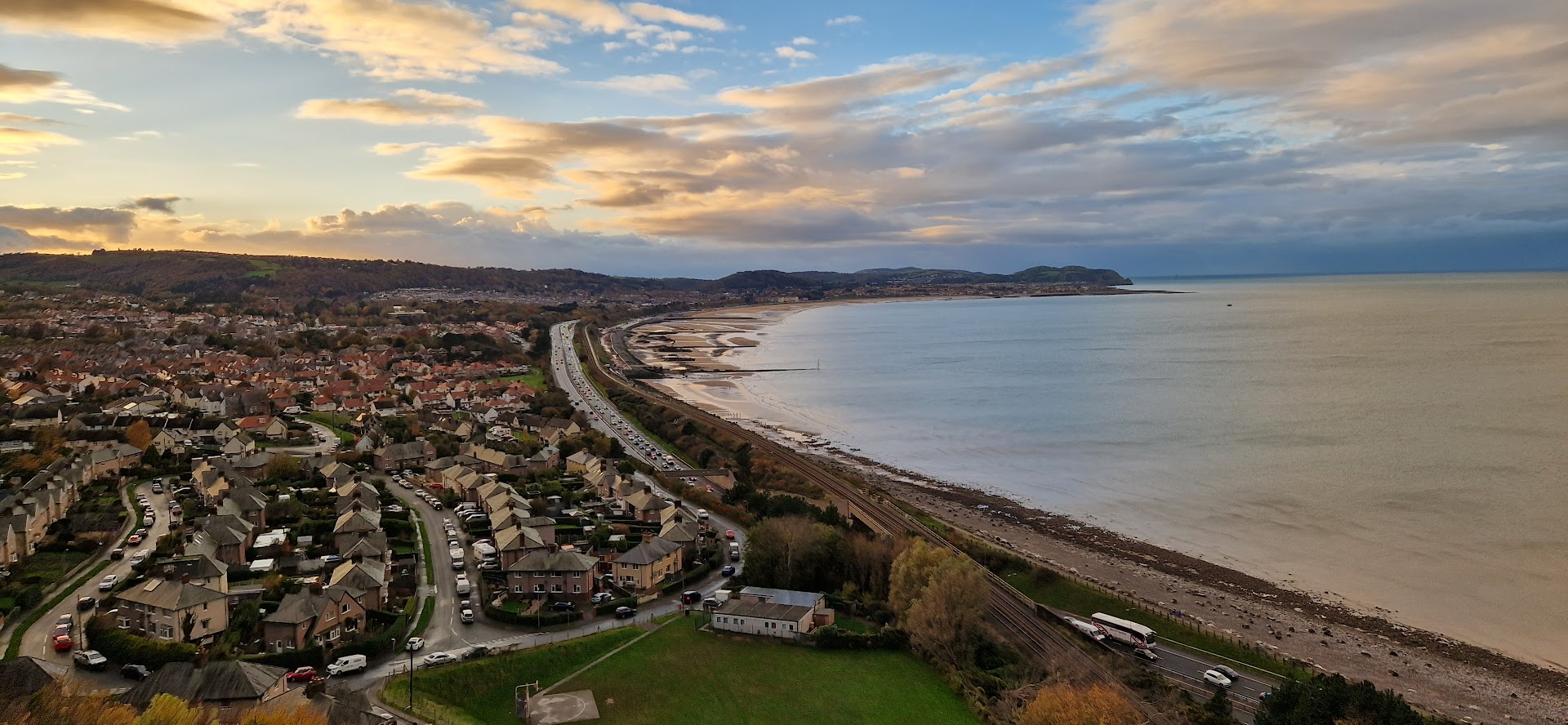
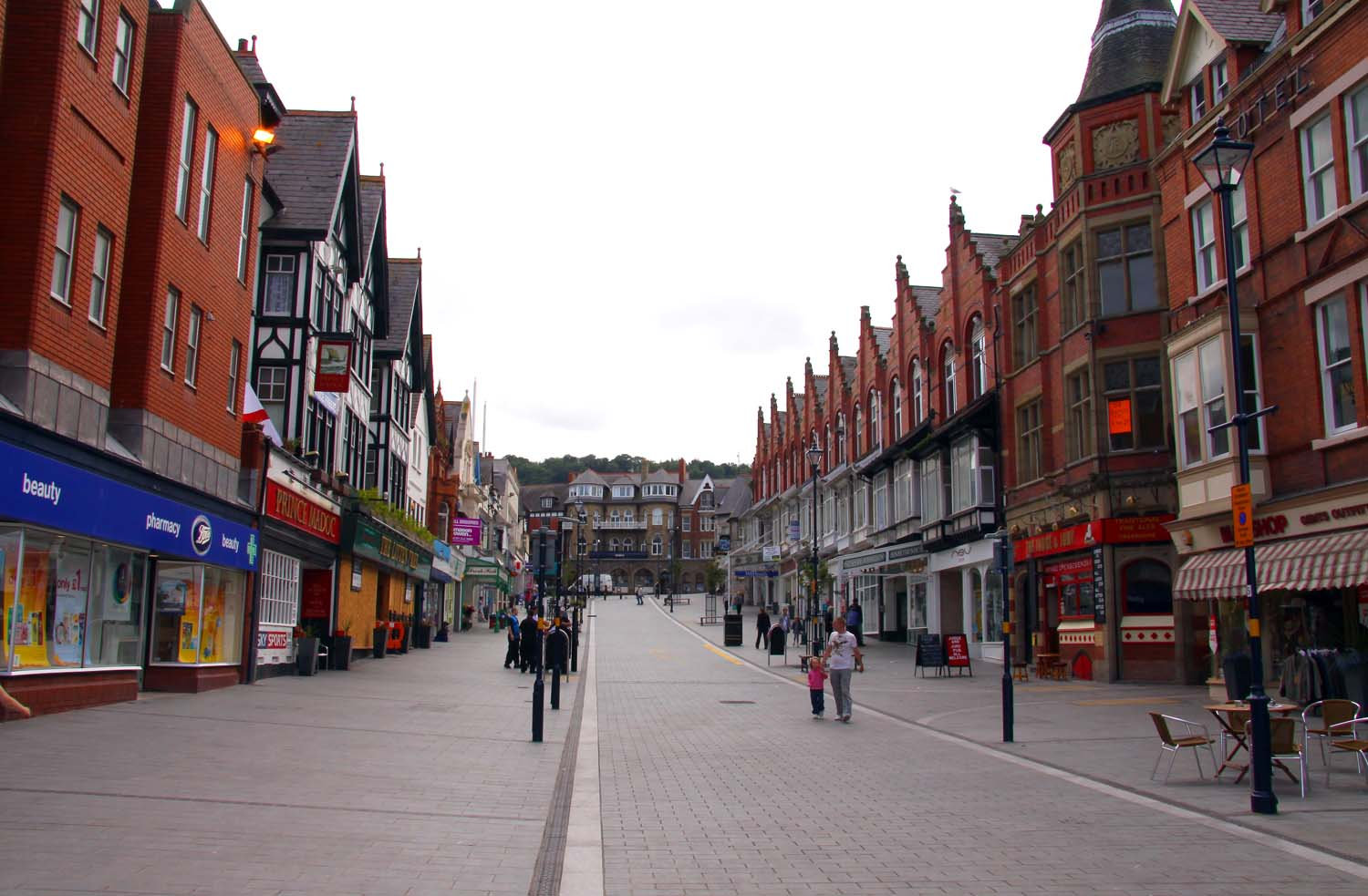
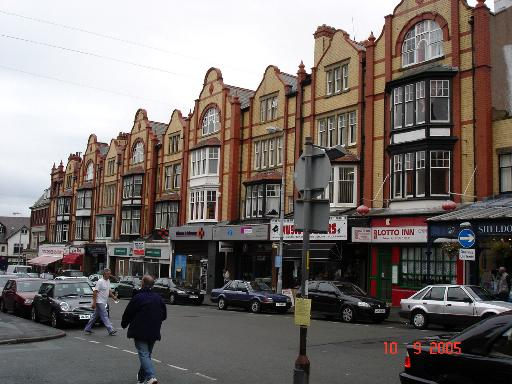
- From the top, View over Colwyn Bay, Station Road, Penrhyn Road

- Location within Conwy
- Population: 10,576 (Community, 2021); 29,275 (Built up area, 2021)
- OS grid reference: SH865785
- Community: Colwyn Bay
- Principal area: Conwy
- Preserved county: Clwyd
- Country: Wales
- Sovereign state: United Kingdom
- Post town: COLWYN BAY
- Postcode district: LL28, LL29
- Dialling code: 01492
- Police: North Wales
- Fire: North Wales
- Ambulance: Welsh
- UK Parliament: Clwyd North
- Senedd Cymru – Welsh Parliament: Clwyd West
- List of places UK Wales Conwy 53.29°N 3.70°W Map of the community

Colwyn Bay (/ˈkɒlwɪn/; Welsh: Bae Colwyn [ˈbai ˈkɔlʊɨn]) is a town, community and seaside resort in Conwy County Borough on the north coast of Wales overlooking the Irish Sea. It lies within the historic county boundaries of Denbighshire. At the 2021 census, the community had a population of 10,576, and the built up area had a population of 29,275. According to the tourist board, it is renowned for its 4.8 kilometre long sandy beach which has been enhanced with millions of tonnes of sand, so therefore 'man-made' and its permanently available irrespective of the tides.

== History ==
The western side of Colwyn Bay, Rhos-on-Sea, includes a number of historic sites associated with St Trillo and Ednyfed Fychan, the 13th century general and councillor to Llywelyn the Great.

The name 'Colwyn' may be named after Collwyn ap Tangno, an 11th century nobleman who was Lord of Eifionnydd, Ardudwy and part of the Llŷn peninsula, or after the River Colwyn in Old Colwyn. (In Welsh the word Colwyn means "puppy" (with the 'w' being a vowel), but Collwyn (with an alveolar lateral fricative) is a more plausible toponym, meaning "hazel grove" (llwyn cyll).)

King Richard II (1367–1400) was ambushed in Old Colwyn in 1399 by supporters of Henry Bolingbroke as he returned to England from Ireland.

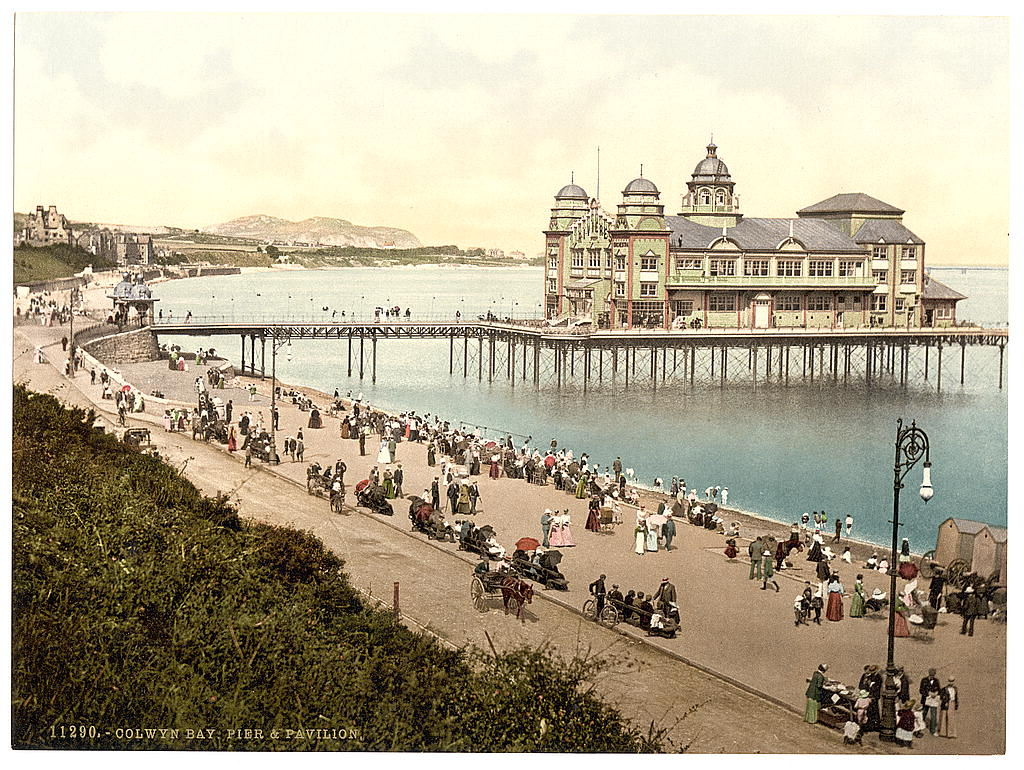
"Pier and Pavilion, Colwyn Bay, Wales", ca. 1890 - 1900.

Colwyn Bay railway station opened in 1849 on the Chester and Holyhead Railway. The station was initially just called Colwyn, but was renamed Colwyn Bay in 1876. As with nearby Llandudno and Rhyl, Colwyn Bay grew rapidly following the arrival of the railway, becoming a seaside holiday town, conveniently accessible for the large towns in north-west England. Much of the area around Colwyn Bay station was owned by the Pwllycrochan Estate. From 1875 onwards, the estate actively sought to develop its land, selling building plots for development whilst retaining some control over the nascent town.

In 1890, the British and African Incorporated Association (African Training Institute) was established in the town by Reverend William Hughes, a missionary pastor, and friend of Henry Morton Stanley, who had spent the early 1880s in 'Congoland' (Congo Free State). Hughes brought back two Congolese children to Colwyn Bay in 1885 to train with the intention that they would then return and be missionaries in Africa. Over its 23 years, the institute trained 87 students.

Britain's first milk bar branch of the National Milk Bar company of Robert William Griffiths was opened in Colwyn Bay in 1933.

During World War II the Colwyn Bay Hotel, Marine Road (now demolished) was the headquarters of the Ministry of Food. This also housed the Cocoa & Chocolate division and was the communications hub for the ministry. They continued to use the hotel until 1953. Colwyn also supported the war effort by becoming a significant location for the diamond cutting and polishing industry, which was used to help fund the war effort.

== Government ==
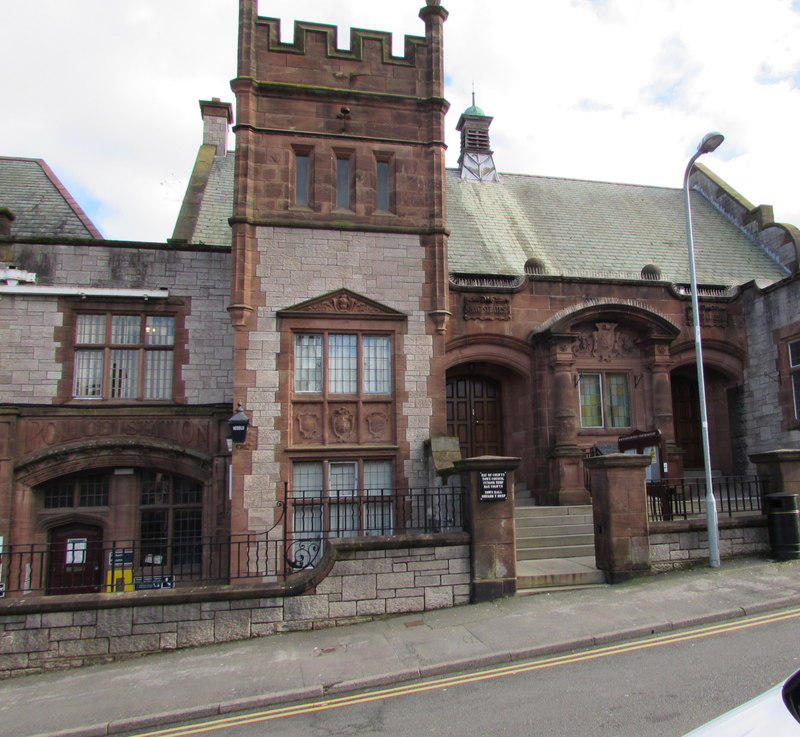
Colwyn Bay Town Hall

There are two tiers of local government covering Colwyn Bay, at community (town) and county borough level: Bay of Colwyn Town Council (Cyngor Tref Bae Colwyn) and Conwy County Borough Council (Cyngor Bwrdeistref Sirol Conwy). The town council is a grouped community council, covering the three communities of Colwyn Bay, Old Colwyn and Rhos-on-Sea. The town council is based at Colwyn Bay Town Hall on Rhiw Road, which was built as a magistrates' court. The county borough council also has its main offices in the town, at Coed Pella on Conway Road.

=== Administrative history ===
The Colwyn Bay area was historically part of the ancient parish of Llandrillo-yn-Rhôs, which straddled the boundary between Denbighshire and Caernarfonshire. The part of the parish in Caernarfonshire was known as the township of Eirias, which contained Old Colwyn. The Eirias township and the neighbouring parish of Llysfaen to the east together formed an exclave of Caernarfonshire. From the 17th century onwards, parishes were gradually given various civil functions under the poor laws, in addition to their original ecclesiastical functions. In some cases, the civil functions were exercised by subdivisions of the parish rather than the parish as a whole. In the case of Llandrillo-yn-Rhôs, the parish was split into two parts for administering the poor laws: the Caernarfonshire township of Eirias, and the rest of the parish in Denbighshire. In 1866, the legal definition of 'parish' was changed to be the areas used for administering the poor laws, and so Eirias and Llandrillo-yn-Rhôs became separate civil parishes.

In 1887, a local government district called 'Colwyn Bay and Colwyn' was created, covering the combined area of the civil parishes of Llandrillo-yn-Rhôs and Eirias. (Note: With the exception of 18 acres of Eirias south-east of Old Colwyn that was almost detached from the rest of the township; that area was transferred to Llysfaen parish in 1896.) The district was then administered by an elected local board. When elected county councils were established in 1889 under the Local Government Act 1888, districts such as Colwyn Bay and Colwyn were no longer allowed to straddle county boundaries; the county boundary was therefore adjusted to place the whole district in Denbighshire. Such districts were reconstituted as urban districts under the Local Government Act 1894.

The Colwyn Bay and Colwyn Urban District was enlarged in 1923 to take in the neighbouring parish of Llysfaen, which was consequently also transferred from Caernarfonshire to Denbighshire. The urban district was renamed from 'Colwyn Bay and Colwyn' to just 'Colwyn Bay' in 1926. The three civil parishes within the urban district were then Llandrillo-yn-Rhôs, Eirias and Llysfaen; they were merged into a single parish called Llandrillo-yn-Rhôs matching the urban district in 1927. The urban district was incorporated to become a municipal borough in 1934.

The borough of Colwyn Bay was abolished in 1974 under the Local Government Act 1972. The area became part of the new borough of Colwyn in Clwyd. The area of the pre-1974 borough of Colwyn Bay became a community. It was later subdivided into five smaller communities in 1983: Colwyn Bay, Llysfaen, Mochdre, Old Colwyn, and Rhos-on-Sea.

Local government was reorganised again in 1996, when the modern county borough of Conwy was created. Alongside the 1996 reforms, a grouped community council was created covering the three communities of Colwyn Bay, Old Colwyn and Rhos-on-Sea, with its community council taking the name Bay of Colwyn Town Council.

== Geography ==
The town is situated about halfway along the north coast of Wales, between the sea and the Pwllycrochan Woods on the towering hillside. Groes yn Eirias (Welsh:Cross in Torch) was once a separate hamlet centred on the Glyn farmhouse (c1640) but the area is now occupied by the Glyn estate and Eirias Park.

== Climate ==
Like the rest of the British Isles, Colwyn Bay experiences a maritime climate with cool summers and mild winters, and often high winds. The local climate is well known for the prevalence of Foehn winds: winds from the south which pass over the nearby mountains and warm and dry on their descent, leading to far higher temperatures than might otherwise be expected; the area held the Welsh high temperature record for February at 18.7 °C from 23 February 2012 to 24 February 2019.

Climate data for Colwyn Bay 36m asl, 1981-2010
Month	Jan	Feb	Mar	Apr	May	Jun	Jul	Aug	Sep	Oct	Nov	Dec	Year
Record high °C (°F)	16.1 (61.0)	18.7 (65.7)	21.4 (70.5)	24.8 (76.6)	28.1 (82.6)	30.3 (86.5)	33.0 (91.4)	32.4 (90.3)	28.3 (82.9)	27.2 (81.0)	18.3 (64.9)	16.4 (61.5)	33.0 (91.4)
Mean daily maximum °C (°F)	8.5 (47.3)	8.4 (47.1)	10.3 (50.5)	12.1 (53.8)	15.2 (59.4)	17.6 (63.7)	19.6 (67.3)	19.4 (66.9)	17.4 (63.3)	14.3 (57.7)	11.1 (52.0)	8.9 (48.0)	13.6 (56.5)
Mean daily minimum °C (°F)	2.8 (37.0)	2.7 (36.9)	4.1 (39.4)	5.3 (41.5)	7.7 (45.9)	10.4 (50.7)	12.5 (54.5)	12.5 (54.5)	10.7 (51.3)	8.1 (46.6)	5.7 (42.3)	3.2 (37.8)	7.2 (45.0)
Record low °C (°F)	−9.9 (14.2)	−7.2 (19.0)	−9.3 (15.3)	−4.2 (24.4)	−1.7 (28.9)	2.4 (36.3)	5.7 (42.3)	4.0 (39.2)	0.6 (33.1)	−3.8 (25.2)	−7.3 (18.9)	−10.4 (13.3)	−10.4 (13.3)
Average precipitation mm (inches)	74.7 (2.94)	53.0 (2.09)	57.5 (2.26)	50.7 (2.00)	52.9 (2.08)	56.1 (2.21)	52.1 (2.05)	64.6 (2.54)	70.2 (2.76)	96.8 (3.81)	89.8 (3.54)	90.2 (3.55)	808.7 (31.84)
Mean monthly sunshine hours	56.2	81.8	115.0	162.8	209.0	185.6	189.6	174.7	135.2	108.2	59.9	44.1	1,522
Source: Met Office

== Demography ==
At the 2021 census, the community of Colwyn Bay had a population of 10,576, and the built up area as defined by the Office for National Statistics had a population of 29,275. Bay of Colwyn Town Council serves the combined area of the three communities of Colwyn Bay, Old Colwyn (8,125) and Rhos-on-Sea (7,766), which therefore had a combined population of 26,467 in 2021.

At the 2011 census, 17.9% of the Colwyn Bay community's population aged three and above reported that they could speak Welsh. The 2011 census also noted that 29.9% of the population who were born in Wales could speak Welsh.

== Economy ==
The town is dominated by the tourist trade, because of its famous beaches. Colwyn Bay is a Fairtrade Town as certified by the Fairtrade Foundation as part of the Fairtrade Towns scheme.

== Culture ==
Colwyn Bay hosted the National Eisteddfod in 1910 and 1947. Also the Victoria Pier hosted many dances and shows during the 20th century and became popular with touring bands and artistes through the 1960s until the final gig there in August 2008.

== Community facilities ==
The town has parks and gardens and a number of natural amenities such as Eirias Park. Colwyn Bay has received a gold award 8 times in the Wales in Bloom competition. In 2009 and 2010 the town has been invited to enter Britain in Bloom and has been awarded silver gilt in both years. The Welsh Mountain Zoo is nearby.

The Porth Eirias Watersports Centre offers tuition in sailing, windsurfing and power boating as well as kayak and canoe hire. In 2013 it was nominated for Building Design's Carbuncle Cup. It was described by the Building Design magazine as “oppressively bland, shaped like a dumpster, and totally insensitive to the beautiful surrounding coast".

== Landmarks ==
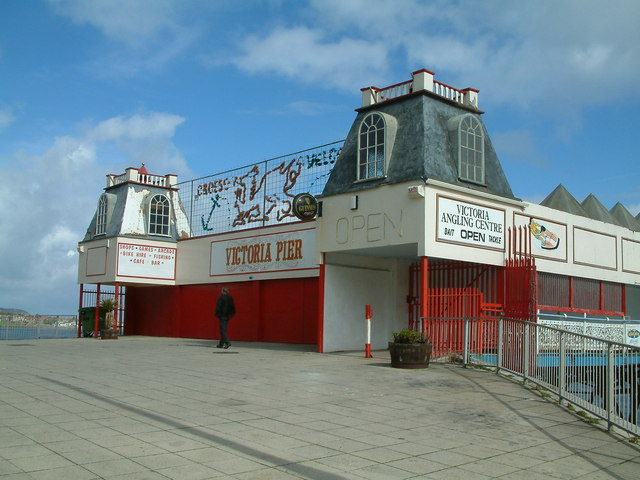
Victoria pier

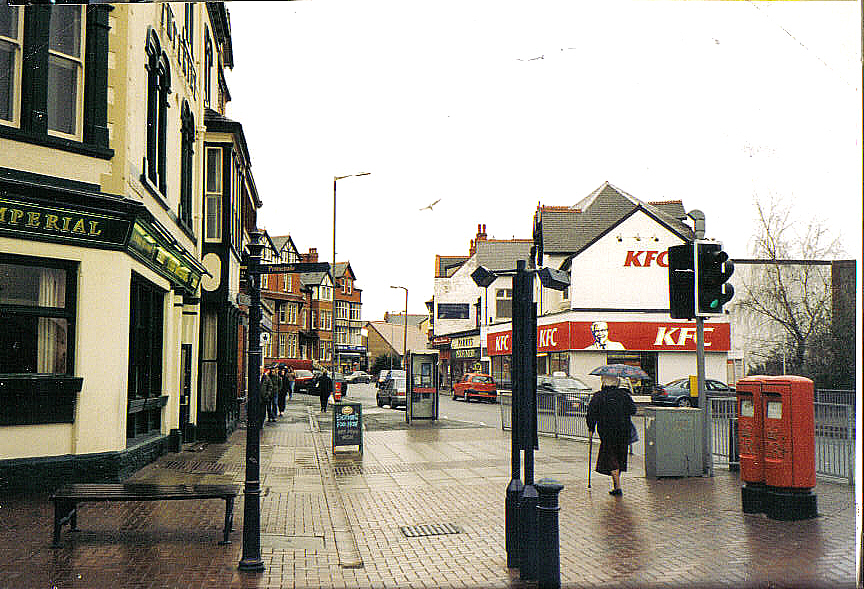
Colwyn Bay in the early 2000s.The buildings to the right have since been demolished.

The Victoria Pier was closed to the public in 2009, when a dispute between Conwy County Borough Council and the pier's owner led to him being declared bankrupt. The fate of the pier was initially uncertain; the council hoped it would be "substantially" demolished for "health and safety and visual reasons to be able to re-open that section of the beach”. In January 2017, the lower end of the pier partially collapsed into the sea and Conwy Council subsequently announced plans to dismantle and store the pier, with a view of restoring it at a later date. The pier was finally demolished in May 2018.

Llety'r Dryw is a Grade II listed house in Abergele Road, built for the uncle of Anthony Eden and now used as the training centre for North Wales Police. Llys Euryn is a medieval manor house on Bryn Euryn, now in ruins. There are a number of buildings by notable local architect Sidney Colwyn Foulkes. These include Williams Deacon's Bank 1925 and Colwyn House 1933-7 originally occupied by the W.S.Wood department store. Colwyn Bay Community Hospital was completed in 1925.

Cotswold, on Brackley Avenue, is a notable town villa by Alfred Steinthal. Built for a Manchester businesswoman, the house was subsequently the home of Sidney Colwyn Foulkes. It is a Grade II listed building. Its Japanese and Arts and Crafts style gardens are listed, also at Grade II on the Cadw/ICOMOS Register of Parks and Gardens of Special Historic Interest in Wales. Another notable garden is The Flagstaff, overlooking the bay. It was designed by Thomas Hayton Mawson for a house that was not ultimately built, and is listed at Grade II on the Cadw/ICOMOS register.

== Transport ==
The town is served by Colwyn Bay railway station located in the town centre on the North Wales Coast Line with trains run by Transport for Wales and Avanti West Coast. The A55 road passes through the town, running parallel to the North Wales Coast Line.

=== Tramline ===
The Llandudno and Colwyn Bay Electric Railway operated an electric tramway service between Llandudno and Rhos-on-Sea from 1907 and extended to Colwyn Bay in 1908. The service closed in 1956.

== Education ==
Colwyn Bay has three secondary schools - one private and two state. Eirias High School is in Eirias Park and Ysgol Bryn Elian is in Old Colwyn. Ysgol Bryn Elian mainly serves Old Colwyn and Eirias High School mainly serves Colwyn Bay, Rhos on Sea and Penrhyn Bay.

Rydal Penrhos School is a Methodist public school, which is on multiple sites in the town. Fees at this elite public school exceeded more than £34,000 per year for boarding in 2021 and boasts the only Eton Fives courts in Wales. Former alumni include Princess Maria of Romania, a cousin of King Charles III.

The town's primary schools are Ysgol Nant y Groes, Ysgol Pen-y-Bryn, Ysgol T Gwynn Jones, Ysgol Hen Golwyn, and Saint Joseph's R.C. Primary and the Welsh-language Ysgol Bod Alaw.

== Religious sites ==
Churches in and around the town include the parish church St Paul's Church, St David's Welsh Church, St John the Baptist's Church, St Joseph's Roman Catholic Church and Christ Church, Bryn-y-Maen to the south of the town.

== Sport ==
The local football team is Colwyn Bay F.C. who play in the Cymru Premier, the top tier of Welsh football after securing promotion in the 2022–23 season. The local cricket team is Colwyn Bay Cricket Club who play at Penrhyn Avenue and the rugby union team is Colwyn Bay RFC. As of 2012, the RGC 1404 rugby team play at Eirias Stadium in Colwyn Bay as part of a development venture by the WRU.

Colwyn Bay Golf Club (now defunct) was founded in 1893. The club and course closed in 1959 and the land was used for a housing development.

The Black Cat Cycling Club, founded in 2014, is based in Colwyn Bay with members made up of cyclists from the town and the surrounding area.

Glamorgan County Cricket Club traditionally play one first-class game a year at Colwyn Bay.

North Wales Crusaders are a rugby league club that play in the RFL Championship at the Eirias Stadium in Colwyn Bay.

== Notable people ==
See Category:People from Colwyn Bay

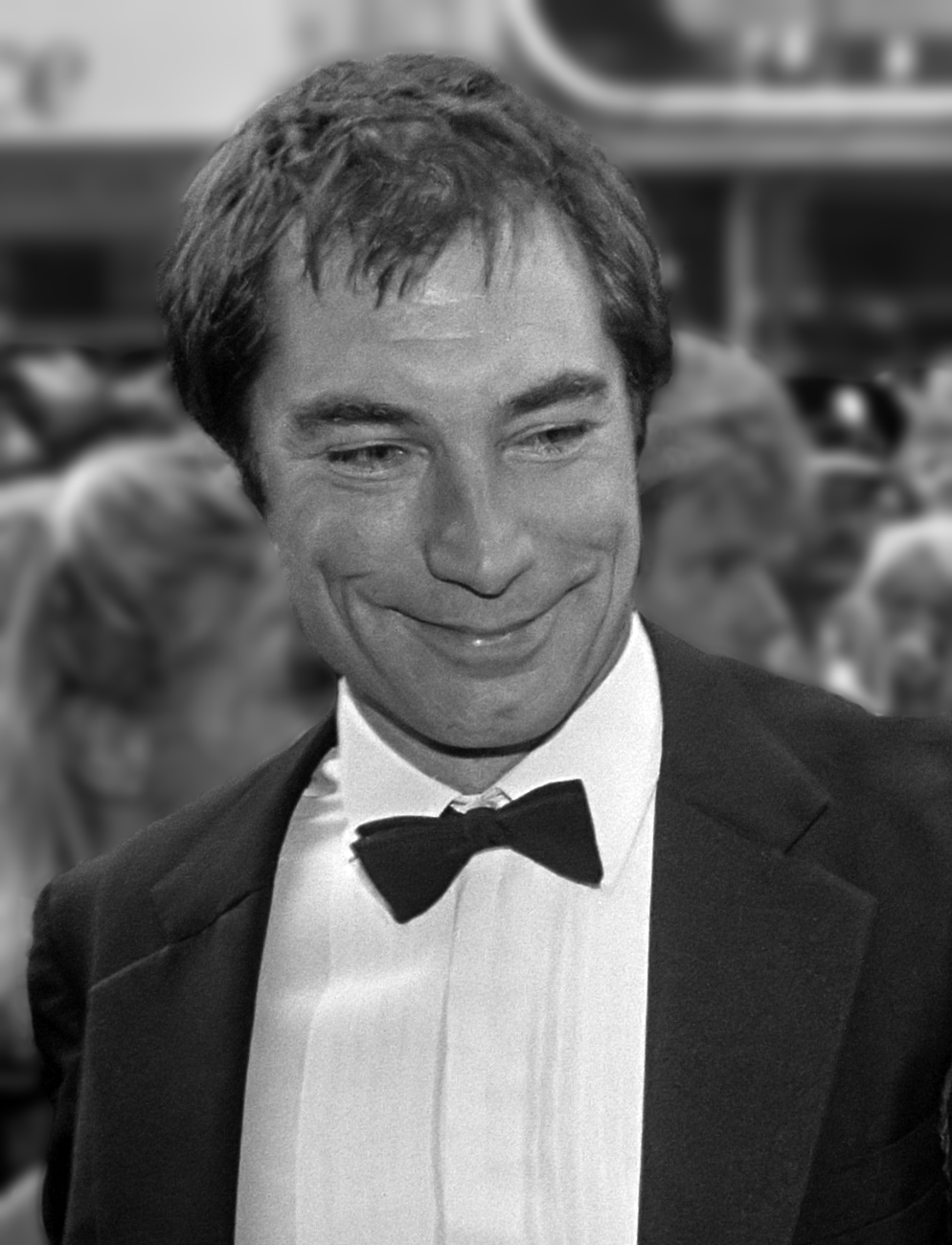
Timothy Dalton, 1987

- William Davies (born at Groes yn Eirias in 1555), a Welsh Roman Catholic priest and martyr, beatified in 1987
- William Roache (born 1932), actor, plays Ken Barlow in Coronation Street; attended Rydal Penrhos independent day school
- Terry Jones (1942–2020) actor and comedian with the Monty Python comedy team
- Alun Michael (born 1943) South Wales Police and Crime Commissioner and former MP
- Timothy Dalton (born 1946) actor, played James Bond, 1986–1994
- Richard Ellis (born 1950), California-based astronomer; born and went to school in Old Colwyn
- Paula Yates (1959–2000), British television presenter and writer
- Helen Willetts (born 1972), BBC weather reporter
- The Vivienne (1992–2025), drag queen who won season 1 of RuPaul's Drag Race UK; born in the Bay and attended Rydal Penrhos until age 16
- Isabelle Jane Foulkes (1970–2001), Anglo-Welsh artist, textile designer and disability campaigner
- Harold Lowe (1882–1944), Fifth officer of RMS Titanic, lived here from 1913 to 1931.

=== Sport ===
- Nancie Colling (1919–2020) an international lawn bowls competitor
- Tony Lewis (born 1938), cricketer who captained Glamorgan
- Mike Walker (born 1945), footballer with 656 club caps and former manager of Everton FC and Norwich City FC
- Peter O'Sullivan (born 1951) a former footballer with 530 club caps, mainly with Brighton
- Mickey Thomas (born 1954) footballer, played for Manchester United, Chelsea, Shrewsbury Town and Wrexham with 603 club caps and 51 for Wales; lives in Mochdre
- Carl Dale (born 1966), footballer for Chester City and Cardiff City with over 430 club caps
- Rachel Taylor (born 1983), Welsh women's rugby international player
- Marc Williams (born 1988), footballer with over 400 club caps
- Ash Dykes (born ca.1990) adventurer and extreme athlete; grew up in Old Colwyn
- Rosie Hughes (born 1995), footballer for Wrexham Women

== See also ==
- Mochdre, a village to the west that was originally part of the Borough.
