= Christ Church, Bryn-y-Maen =

Coordinates: 53.2695°N 3.7465°W

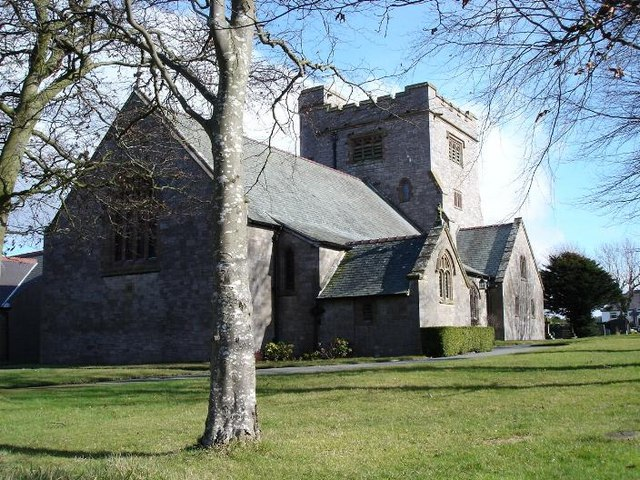
- Christ Church, Bryn-y-Maen, from the southwest
- Christ Church, Bryn-y-Maen
- OS grid reference: SH836761
- Location: Bryn-y-Maen, Colwyn Bay, Conwy County Borough
- Country: Wales
- Denomination: Anglican
- Website: Colwyn Bay Parish

History
- Status: Parish church
- Founder: Mrs Eleanor Frost
- Dedication: Christ
- Consecrated: 28 September 1899

Architecture
- Functional status: Active
- Architect: Douglas & Fordham
- Architectural type: Church
- Style: Gothic Revival
- Groundbreaking: 4 May 1897
- Completed: 1899

Specifications
- Materials: Limestone with external dressings and ashlar interior of Helsby sandstone

Administration
- Province: Wales
- Diocese: St Asaph
- Archdeaconry: St Asaph
- Deanery: Rhos

Clergy
- Vicar: Rev'd Christine Owen
- Priest: Rev'd Ginny Burton

Christ Church, Bryn-y-Maen is in the small village of Bryn-y-Maen on the B5113 road some 3 km to the south of Colwyn Bay in Conwy County Borough, Wales. It is an active Anglican church in the deanery of Rhos, the archdeaconry of St Asaph and the diocese of St Asaph. The church is known locally as "The Cathedral of the Hills". It is designated by Cadw as a Grade II* listed building.

== History ==
Christ Church was built between 1879 and 1899 at the expense of Mrs Eleanor Frost in memory of her late husband Charles Frost. The architects were Douglas and Fordham of Chester in Neo-Perpendicular style. Mrs Frost's commission also included the vicarage and a house for herself.

== Architecture ==
The church is built in local limestone with dressings and ashlar interior in Helsby sandstone. Its plan is cruciform with a squat tower at the crossing over the choir. There is a broad nave and a south aisle. The transepts contain the vestry and the organ chamber. The top of the tower is crenellated and the bell openings have straight heads.

Internally the arcade has octagonal piers. The transverse tower arches are almost circular and have continuous chamfering. The furnishings are in "characteristic Douglas" style and include not only the reredos, organ case, stalls, pulpit, lectern, font cover and pews, but also the hymn board, the alms box and an umbrella stand.

== See also ==
- List of new churches by John Douglas
