= Ash Dykes =

Welsh adventurer

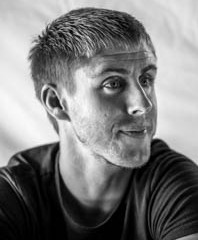
- Dykes in 2016
- Born: Ashley Philip Dykes
- Known for: Trekking
- Website: www.ashdykes.com

Ash Dykes is a Welsh adventurer and extreme athlete. His world records include trekking solo and unsupported across Mongolia, hiking the length of Madagascar, and being the first known person to walk along the full 4,000-mile (6,400-kilometre) course of the Yangtze.

== Personal life ==
Dykes grew up in Old Colwyn, Wales.

== Career ==
He worked as a lifeguard to finance his first trip to China. He walked solo and unsupported across Mongolia in 2014, aged 23. The 1,500 mi (2,400 km) journey over the Altai Mountains and across the Gobi Desert took 78 days. He became known to locals as the "lonely snow leopard".

In 2015 he completed the 1,600 mi (2,600 km) trek across Madagascar via its eight highest peaks, another world first. Along the way, he contracted the deadliest strain of malaria and was close to death. As a result of the experience, he is now a special ambassador for the charity Malaria No More UK.

He recounted his adventures in Mongolia and Madagascar in Mission Possible: A Decade of Living Dangerously, published by Eye Books in 2017.

In August 2018, he embarked on another world-first record attempt, to walk the 4,000 mi (6,400 km) course of the Yangtze river. The successful completion of his year-long mission earned him celebrity status in China.

In 2024, Dykes was part of a 4-person team that rowed the length of the Coppename River by kayak and then hiked Julianatop. They were listed by Guinness World Records as the "first team to row the length of the Coppename River by canoe/kayak" and to have "fastest time to climb Julianatop (team) with a time of 5 days, 8 hours and 35 minutes".

== Awards ==
He won the 2016 Welsh Adventurer of the Year Award. He has been named the seventh-coolest person in Wales and was described as "one of the world’s most fearless outdoor men" by FHM magazine.
