= St David's Welsh Church, Rhosllanerchrugog =

St David's Welsh Church
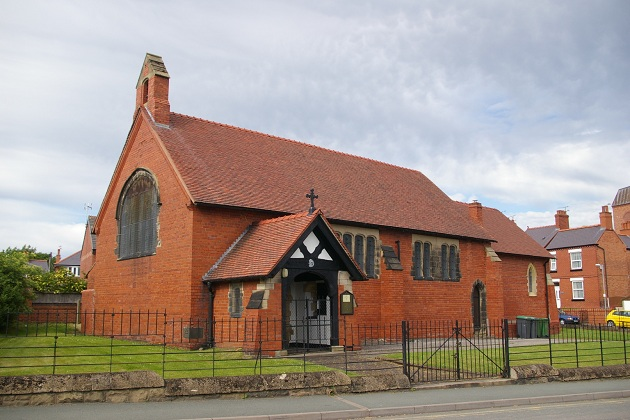
- St David's Welsh Church
- 53.0115°N 3.0569°W
- OS grid reference: SJ 291 465
- Location: Broad Street, Rhosllanerchrugog, Wrexham County Borough
- Country: Wales
- Denomination: Church in Wales

Architecture
- Architect(s): Douglas and Fordham; J. H. Swainson
- Architectural type: Church
- Style: Gothic Revival
- Completed: 1936

Specifications
- Materials: Ruabon brick with sandstone dressings

Clergy
- Vicar: Rev'd Phil Bettinson

St David's Welsh Church is located on Broad Street, in Rhosllanerchrugog, Wrexham County Borough, Wales.

The church was built in 1892 to a design by Douglas and Fordham of Chester. It consists of a nave and a north aisle. It was intended to have a chancel and a steeple at the northeast, but these were not built at the time. The church is constructed in Ruabon brick with some sandstone dressings. The west window is in Perpendicular style and the south porch has timberwork in its gable. A chancel was added in 1935–36 to a design by J. H. Swainson.

St. David's has become part of the Offa Mission Area in the Church In Wales restructuring of Parishes for Vision 2020

In June 2024, a planning application was submitted, proposing to demolish it and replace it with a graveled car lot and cabin.

== See also ==
- List of new churches by John Douglas
