= Holywell Workhouse Chapel =

Chapel in Flintshire, Wales

Coordinates: 53.2663°N 3.2168°W

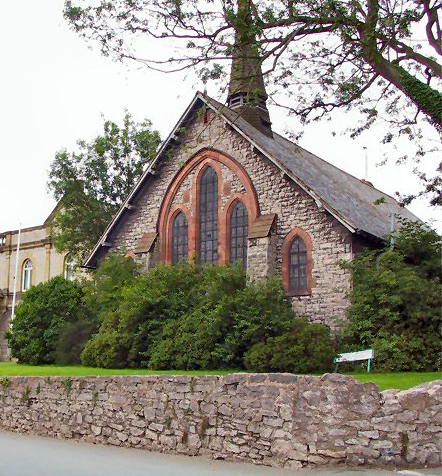
The former chapel to Holywell Workhouse

Holywell Workhouse Chapel was built in association with Holywell Workhouse in Old Chester Road, Holywell, Flintshire, Wales (grid reference SJ189750). It was built, together with some "vagrants' wards" for the workhouse, in 1883–84 to a design by the Chester architect John Douglas.

The chapel is built in stone with a slate roof and has a shingled flèche. The workhouse later became Lluesty Hospital. The chapel is designated by Cadw as Grade II listed building.

== See also ==
- List of new churches by John Douglas
