= Colwyn Bay F.C. =

Association football club in Wales

Colwyn Bay
- Full name: Colwyn Bay Football Club
- Nickname: 'Seagulls' or 'The Bay'
- Founded: 1881
- Ground: Llanelian Road, Old Colwyn
- Capacity: 3,000
- Owner: Carly and Jody Johnson
- Chairman: Brian Madden
- Manager: Michael Wilde
- League: Cymru Premier
- 2025–26: Cymru Premier, 5th of 12
- Website: colwynbayfc.co.uk
Home colours	Away colours

Colwyn Bay Football Club (Welsh: Clwb Pêl-Droed Bae Colwyn) is a football club based in Old Colwyn in North Wales. They are currently members of the Cymru Premier. Nicknamed the Seagulls, but also known as 'The Bay', their home ground is Llanelian Road in Old Colwyn.

== History ==
The club played its first match in January 1881 and joined the North Wales Coast League in 1898. The club were forced to resign from the league during the 1900–01 when they could not find a home ground to play at, with their fixtures taken over by Penmaenmawr Royal Welch Fusiliers. However, they returned to the league the following season. From 1907, the club became known as Colwyn Bay United. After the league folded in 1921, they joined the Welsh National League. In 1927–28 the club finished as runners-up in the league and won the League Cup. They won the cup for a second time in 1929–30, also reaching the semi-finals of the Welsh Cup, in which they lost 3–1 to Rhyl Athletic. The league folded at the end of the season and the club were subsequently founder members of the North Wales Football Combination, which they went on to win in its first season. Following their title, the club joined the Birmingham & District League. However, the team struggled in the new league, and after finishing bottom in 1935–36 and 1936–37, they switched to the Welsh National League (North).

Colwyn Bay finished as Welsh League (North) runners-up in 1945–46, the first season after World War II. They were runners-up again in 1963–64, and were champions the following season. The early 1980s saw the club enter a period of success, as they were champions for a second time in 1980–81. In 1982–83 the club won the league and reached the Welsh Cup semi-finals, losing 4–0 on aggregate to Swansea City.

After retaining the league title in 1983–84, the club returned to the English football league system, joining Division Three of the North West Counties League. They finished as runners-up in their first season in the league and were promoted to Division Two. A fourth-place finish in Division Two 1986–87 saw the club promoted to Division One. In 1987–88 the club reached the first round of the FA Cup for the first time, losing 1–0 at Northwich Victoria. The following season saw the club win the League Cup, beating Warrington Town 3–0 in the final at Gigg Lane. After finishing as Premier Division runners-up in 1990–91, they were promoted to Division One of the Northern Premier League, filling the vacancy created by South Liverpool folding. They won the division at the first attempt and were promoted to the Premier Division. The season also saw them win the North Wales Coast Challenge Cup and reach the Welsh Cup semi-finals for a third time, losing 4–2 to Hednesford Town.

However, at the end of the 1991–92 season, a dispute with the Football Association of Wales led to Colwyn Bay being ordered to join the newly-formed League of Wales or cease playing in Wales. As a result, the club started the new season playing at the Drill Field in Northwich, before moving to Ellesmere Port Stadium in Ellesmere Port. A court injunction allowed the club to return to playing home matches in Colwyn Bay in 1994 before the case was won in the High Court of Justice in April 1995. In 1995–96 they reached the first round of the FA Cup again; after beating Spennymoor United 1–0 in the first round, they lost 2–0 at Blackpool in the second round. They qualified for the first round again the following season, eventually losing 2–0 to fellow north Wales club Wrexham in a replay. Another first round appearance in 1997–98 resulted in a 2–0 defeat at Notts County.

The club remained in the Northern Premier League's Premier Division until the end of the 2002–03 season, when they were relegated to Division One. In 2006–07 a fifth-place finish saw the club qualify for the promotion play-offs, in which they lost 3–2 to Cammell Laird in the semi-finals. League restructuring led to the club being placed in Division One South for the 2007–08 season, before being switched to the North division the following season. Their first season in Division One North resulted in a fourth-place finish and another play-off campaign, in which they lost their semi-final match 4–2 on penalties to Newcastle Blue Star after a 2–2 draw. However, after finishing fourth again in 2009–10, the club were promoted back to the Premier Division via the play-offs, beating Curzon Ashton 2–1 in the semi-finals and then winning 1–0 against Lancaster City in the final.

The 2010–11 season saw Colwyn Bay finish as Premier Division runners-up. In the subsequent play-offs they beat North Ferriby United 2–1 in the semi-finals and then defeated FC United 1–0 in the final to earn promotion to the Conference North. After four seasons in the Conference North, the club were relegated back to the Northern Premier League's Premier Division at the end of the 2014–15 season. They were relegated again in 2015–16, returning to Division One North. In March 2019 the club opted to rejoin the Welsh football system for the 2019–20 season, and joined the newly formed second-tier Cymru North. The 2022–23 season saw the club win the League Cup North and the Cymru North title, losing only once during the season after winning 25 consecutive games, earning promotion to the Cymru Premier. However, they finished second-from-bottom of the Cymru Premier the following season and were relegated back to the Cymru North.

After being relegated, the club changed manager, appointing Mike Wilde. The drop back to the Cymru North was short lived, with a successful campaign in the 2024-25 season, beating Airbus UK into 1st place, taking the title and automatic promotion back to the Cymru Premier.

== Ground ==
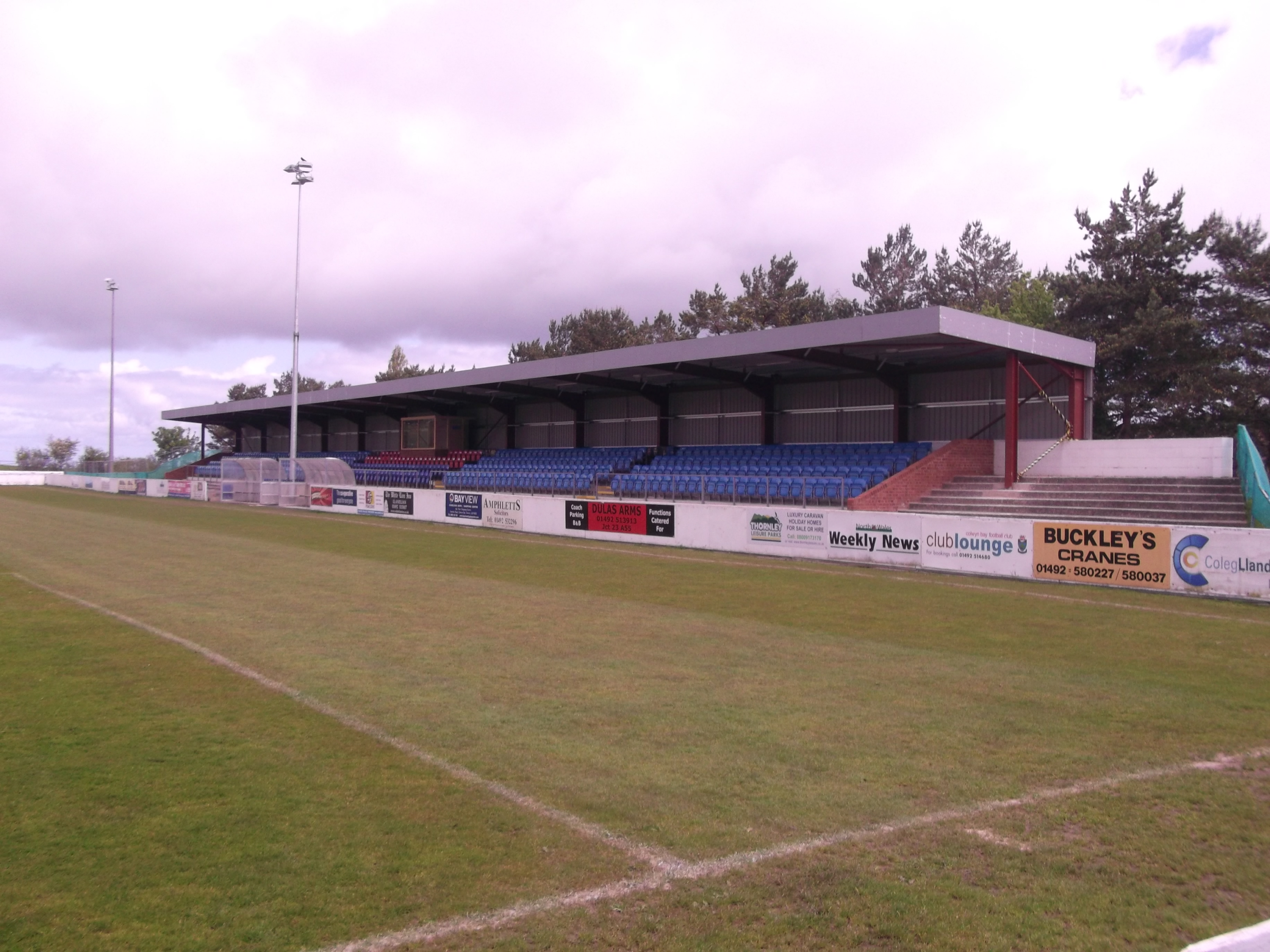
Llanelian Road stand

The club had a nomadic existence during their early years, often having to move as builders acquired land as the town rapidly expanded during the late 19th and early 20th century. They played on land owned by Penrhos School, at the Board School field, at Marine Hotel field and then Eirias Park. After the adjacent school expanded onto the land, they played on a pitch in Mochdre before relocating to another ground at Eirias Park towards the end of the 1940s. This remained home until 1983, when the land was required to dump soil following construction of the A55. Eirias Arena was a temporary home for a season and a half until the club moved to their current Llanelian Road ground in 1984. The Shed End stand was erected in 1985 and two more stands built by 1990, when floodlights were installed and inaugurated with a friendly match against Liverpool. When the club was forced to play outside Wales in 1992, they initially played at Northwich Victoria's Drill Field, before moving to Ellesmere Port.

After returning to Llanelian Road in 1994, terracing was installed on the Llanelian Road side of the ground in 1998. Following promotion to the Conference North, a new covered 500-seat stand was built during the 2011–12 season. In 2023 a new 1,000-seat stand was built to replace two covered terraced stands on the west side of the ground.

== Current squad ==
As of 5 September 2026

Note: Flags indicate national team as defined under FIFA eligibility rules; some limited exceptions apply. Players may hold more than one non-FIFA nationality.

No.	Pos.	Nation	Player
1	GK	ENG	Mark Halstead
2	DF	WAL	Dan Roberts
3	DF	ENG	Sam Hart (captain)
4	DF	WAL	Nathan Peate
5	DF	ENG	Lewis Sirrell (vice-captain)
6	DF	WAL	Sol Forde
7	FW	ENG	Jack Kenny
8	MF	ENG	Callum Bratley
9	FW	WAL	Adam Davies
10	FW	ENG	Louis Robles
11	FW	WAL	Jordan Davies
13	GK	ENG	Seb Osment

No.	Pos.	Nation	Player
16	MF	WAL	Josh Williams (on loan from Tranmere Rovers)
17	FW	WAL	Ethan Roberts
18	MF	ENG	Alex Moore (on loan from Wrexham)
19	FW	ENG	Matty Hill
21	DF	ENG	Ryan Astles
22	MF	ENG	Declan Poole
23	MF	WAL	Aeron Edwards
24	MF	WAL	George Hughes
25	MF	WAL	Luca Moran
31	GK	WAL	Charlie Bubb
45	GK	WAL	Luke Murphy

== Out on loan ==
Note: Flags indicate national team as defined under FIFA eligibility rules; some limited exceptions apply. Players may hold more than one non-FIFA nationality.

No.	Pos.	Nation	Player
12	DF	IRL	Issa Kargbo (at Newtown until January 2027)
14	DF	IRL	Uniss Kargbo (at Newtown until January 2027)
15	FW	WAL	Max McGoona (at Mold Alexandra until January 2027)

No.	Pos.	Nation	Player
20	FW	WAL	Aron Williams (at Bala Town until January 2027)
—	GK	WAL	Ryley Berry (at Gresford Athletic until 1 June 2027)

== Management team ==
Position	Name
Manager	(England) Michael Wilde
Assistant manager	(England) Danny Harrison
Coach	(England) Jason Allcroft
Goalkeeping Coach	(England) Neil Ebbrell
Goalkeeping Coach	(Wales) Rob Rimmington
Head of Sport Science	(England) Dan Skillen
Physiotherapist	(Wales) Seb Richardson
Kit Manager	(Northern Ireland) John Ashley

== Honours ==
- Cymru North
  - Champions 2022–23, 2024–25
  - League Cup North winners 2022–23
- Northern Premier League
  - Division One champions 1991–92
  - Division One League Cup winners 1991–92
- North West Counties League
  - League Cup winners 1988–89
  - Floodlit Trophy winners 1990–91
- Welsh League (North)
  - Champions 1964–65, 1980–81, 1982–83, 1983–84
- North Wales Football Combination
  - Champions 1930–31
- Welsh National League
  - League Cup winners 1927–28
- North Wales Coast Challenge Cup
  - Winners 1930–31, 1960–61 (shared), 1981–82, 1982–83, 1983–84, 1991–92, 1995–96, 1997–98, 1999–2000, 2010–11
- Alves Cup
  - Winners 1963–64
- Cookson Cup
  - Winners 1973–74, 1979–80, 1980–81, 1981–82, 1983–84
- Barrit Cup
  - Winners 1979–80, 1983–84

== Records ==
- Best FA Cup performance: Second round, 1995–96
- Best Welsh Cup performance: Semi-finals: 1929–30, 1982–83, 1991–92, 2021–22
- Best FA Trophy performance: Quarter-finals, 1996–97
- Record attendance: 5,000 vs Borough United, 1964 (at Eirias Park)
- Most appearances: Bryn Jones
- Most goals: Peter Donnelly

== See also ==
- Colwyn Bay F.C. players
- Colwyn Bay F.C. managers

== Sources ==
- Owens, A. (2005). Come On The Bay - Colwyn Bay Football Club 125th Anniversary. Design2Print.
