= Ysgol Eirias =

Location
- Ffordd Eirias; Colwyn Bay, Conwy, LL29 7SP; Wales; 53°17′27″N 3°43′03″W

Information
- Motto: Inspiring Learning
- Founder: P Dodd
- Local authority: Conwy
- Department for Education URN: 401689 Tables
- Chair of Governors: Kerry Jones
- Head: Zoe Evans
- Staff: 115
- Age: 11 to 18
- Enrolment: 1254 (2023)
- Houses: Llywelyn Hawks, Gwynedd Falcons, Glyndwr Eagles & Madog Kites
- Colour: Maroon
- Website: www.eirias.co.uk

Ysgol Eirias, (English: Eirias School) is a secondary school situated in Colwyn Bay, in Conwy county borough, North Wales. The school has approximately 1600 pupils and over 120 teachers and staff. The school’s name is derived from its location, the grounds of Eirias Park. The current headteacher is Zoe Evans, taking over from Sarah Sutton, who took over from Phil McTague in 2017.

== School life ==
=== Houses ===
Ysgol Eirias has four houses. The houses are each named after a Prince of Wales adjoined to the name of a bird. Glyndwr Eagles, Llewelyn Hawks, Madog Kites and Gwynedd Falcons. Students are assigned to a house when joining the school based on their form group, and stay in that house throughout their school career.

Each house is assigned a colour, yellow, blue, red and green for Eagles, Hawks, Kites and Falcons, respectively. There are many Inter-house competitions for sports and art.

=== Uniform ===
At Ysgol Eirias, all students are required to wear complete and correct uniform. There are two separate designated uniforms, one for years 7-11 and one for the sixth form, as well as regulations on PE kits.

In years 7-11 students must wear black trousers or a black skirt, a white shirt or blouse, a maroon jumper bearing the school crest, black school shoes, and black or white socks. A wide variety of ties are worn by students.

- Most commonly, the standard year 7-11 tie, which is black with silver and maroon stripes, and a thinner stripe in the student's respective house colour.
- The Sports Colour, which is a black tie with a thick diagonal stripe in the students' house colour with a circular dragon and the initials EHS in black in the middle
- The Music Tie, which is awarded by the music department to students who have shown commitment to extra-curricular music in school and represented the County. The tie includes a large, diagonal stripe with the dragon and initials, as shown on the sports tie, and a staff pattern bearing a treble clef underneath.

One of the school rules that prohibits the wearing of outdoor clothes attracted press attention during the local cold spell in December 2010.

The PE kit bears the school crest, and must be bought through the school, and consists of a while polo short bearing the crest and black shorts for indoor activities, a red/black rugby shirt, long black socks and black shorts for boys and black jogging bottoms or games skirt and a red sweatshirt for girls for outdoor activities.

Sixth form uniform is identical to the uniform worn by students in year 7-11, except with a black jumper and sixth form tie. The sixth form tie is similar to the sports tie, except the diagonal stripe bearing the dragon emblem is an outline and is not filled solidly.

After long discussion, the senior members of the school's staff introduced a ban on all outdoor jackets, although a ban on indoor jackets is vague. This has been responded with high praise within the school from inspectors.

Eirias is known famously in the area for being a "No Hat School", this rule being enforced by many respected members of the school's faculty.

== Controversies ==
=== YouTube data protection breach ===
In December 2010, a teacher at the school uploaded a video onto a school-owned account on the video-sharing website YouTube. The video was a screen recording of him demonstrating using the school's management system to record a behaviour incident, and included the name, home address, parents' contact details, photograph and confidential records of attendance and behaviour for a year 11 boy at the school.

The video went unnoticed until 31 January 2011, when complaints were submitted by an anonymous individual simultaneously to the school's governors, Conwy County Borough Council education authority, General Teaching Council for Wales, Department for Education and the Information Commissioner's Office; the video was removed. Local television covered the story heavily and the boy's family received an apology and the investigation by the ICO resulted in a formal warning on the condition the school improved its data security arrangements.

=== School report hacking incident ===
A sixth form and 5th year pupil, Matthew Higgins & Michael Rowlands were accused of hacking into their school computer system in 2012 and Higgins, attempting to do it again two months later, had been found guilty. Higgins always denied securing unauthorised access to computer data at the school while Rowlands openly admitted it, despite never being charged.
