= St John the Baptist's Church, Old Colwyn =

Church in Conwy County Borough, Wales

Coordinates: 53.2906°N 3.6974°W

St John's Church, Old Colwyn
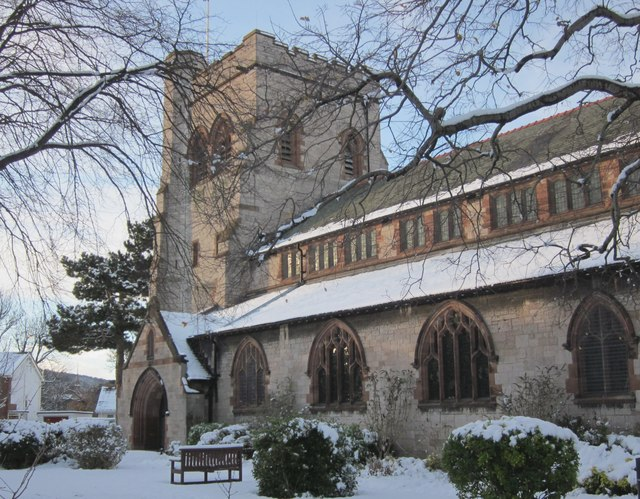
- St John's Church, Old Colwyn
- OS grid reference: SH 869 784
- Location: Station Road, Old Colwyn, Conwy County Borough
- Country: Wales
- Denomination: Anglican

History
- Status: Anglican Church in Wales
- Dedication: St John the Baptist
- Consecrated: 13 August 1903

Architecture
- Functional status: Active
- Heritage designation: Grade II*
- Designated: 9 September 1994
- Architect(s): Douglas and Minshull; Douglas, Minshull and Muspratt
- Architectural type: Church
- Style: Gothic Revival
- Groundbreaking: 18 October 1899
- Completed: 1912

Specifications
- Materials: Limestone with sandstone dressings and interior Green slate roof with red terracotta ridge tiles

Administration
- Province: Wales
- Diocese: St Asaph
- Archdeaconry: St Asaph

Clergy
- Vicar: Revd Gareth L Erlandson

St John's Church, Old Colwyn, is on Station Road, Old Colwyn, in Conwy County Borough, Wales. It is a member church of the Aled Mission Area, in the archdeaconry of St Asaph and the diocese of St Asaph. St John's was built as the daughter church of St Catherine's Church, Abergele Road, Colwyn. It is designated by Cadw as a Grade II* listed building.

== History ==
The church was built for the English-speaking community when the services at St Catherine's were conducted in Welsh. It was designed by the Chester firm of Douglas and Minshull. The foundation stone was laid in 1899 by Mrs Eleanor Frost who also paid for many of the church furnishings, including the reredos, altar, rails, screen and the pulpit. The tower was added in 1912 after the death of John Douglas, when the firm was known as Douglas, Minshull and Muspratt.

== Architecture ==
The external walls are built in local Penmaen limestone with Hollington sandstone dressings. The internal walls are in ashlar Hollington sandstone. The tower is at the west end and the roof has the style of a double hammerbeam. The stained glass in one of the windows in the south aisle is by Charles Kempe.

== External features ==
The entrance gate to the churchyard is a Grade II listed building.

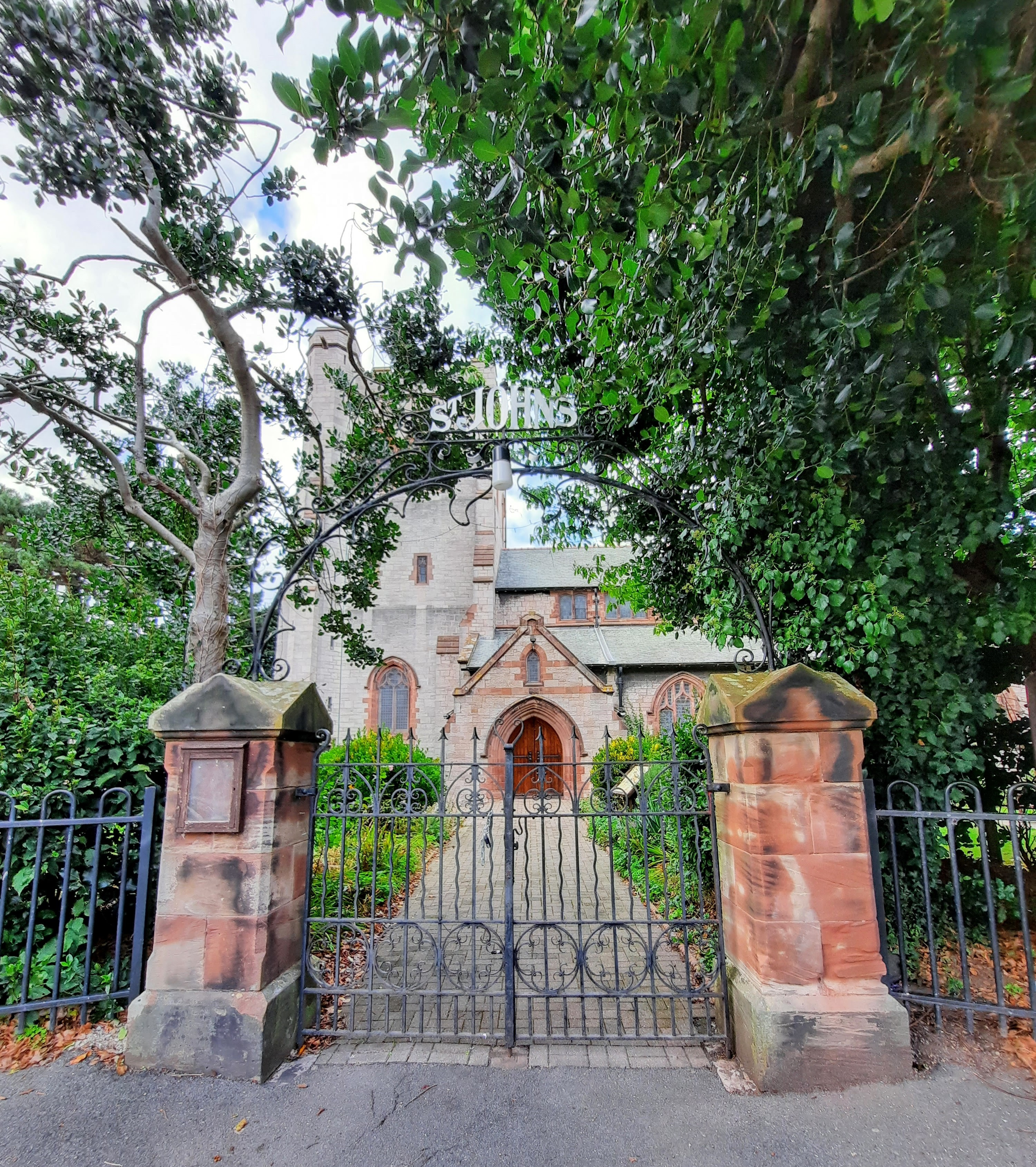
St John's Church Gate

== See also ==
- List of new churches by John Douglas
