= St Joseph's Roman Catholic Church, Colwyn Bay =

Catholic church in Colwyn Bay, Wales

Coordinates: 53.2972°N 3.7341°W

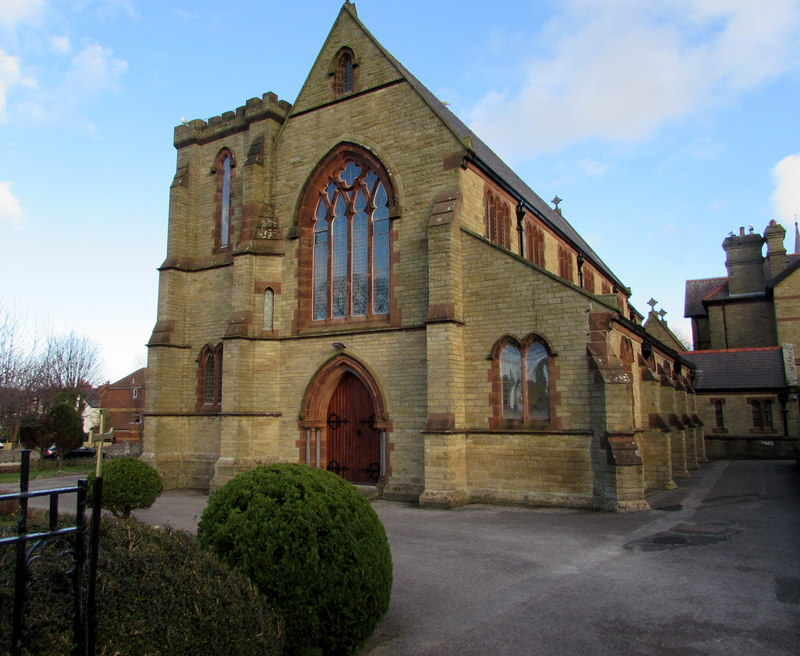
St Joseph's Church

St Joseph's Roman Catholic Church is on Conway Road, Colwyn Bay, in Conwy County Borough, Wales. The Roman Catholic parish church of Colwyn Bay, it is part of the Diocese of Wrexham.

== History ==
St Joseph's Church was designed by R. Curran; building began in 1898 and was completed in 1900. Monsignor James Lennon of Lancashire donated the money to build the church, in memory of his brother, Dean John Lennon.

== School ==
St Joseph's Catholic Primary School is a voluntary aided school in the grounds of the church on Brackley Avenue. The school opened in 1933 and the current head teacher is Mr J. Wilkinson.

== See also ==
- Media related to St Joseph's Church, Colwyn Bay at Wikimedia Commons
