= St Matthew's Church, Saltney =

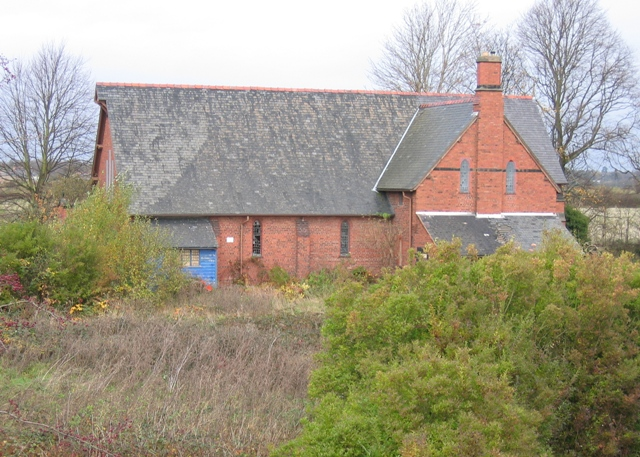
- St Matthew's Church, Saltney, in 2006, following closure
- St Matthew's Church, Saltney
- 53°10′51.63″N 2°56′44.81″W
- Location: Flint Road, Saltney, Flintshire
- Country: Wales
- Denomination: Church in Wales

History
- Dedication: St Matthew

Architecture
- Architect: John Douglas
- Architectural type: Church
- Groundbreaking: 1910
- Completed: 1911
- Closed: 4 June 2000
- Demolished: December 2008 (destroyed by fire)

Specifications
- Materials: Brick

Administration
- Province: York
- Diocese: Chester
- Archdeaconry: Chester
- Deanery: Chester
- Parish: Lache cum Saltney

St Matthew's Church, Saltney, was in Flint Road, Saltney, Flintshire, Wales (grid reference SJ368654).

The church was opened in 1911 as a mission church to the parish church of St Mark, Saltney. St Mark's Church is an Anglican church in the parish of Lache cum Saltney, the deanery of Chester, the archdeaconry of Chester and the diocese of Chester.

St Matthew's was designed by the Chester architect John Douglas and built in brick with lancet windows. It was intended to have a longer nave and a tower at the northwest, but these were never completed. Its plan consisted of a broad nave and a chancel with a south aisle. In the series The Buildings of Wales, Edward Hubbard expressed the opinion that the church was "not impressive externally" although "the interior is more rewarding".

After the church became redundant, it was closed on 4 June 2000. The building was destroyed by fire in December 2008.

== See also ==
- List of new churches by John Douglas
- List of churches in Flintshire
