= St Paul's Church, Colwyn Bay =

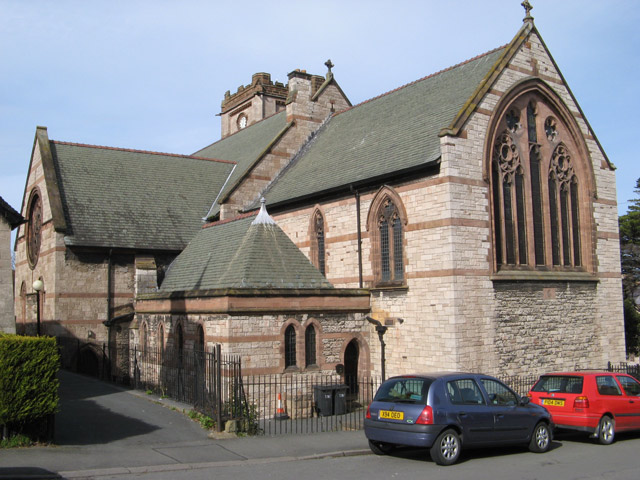
- St Paul's Church, Colwyn Bay, from the southeast
- St Paul's Church, Colwyn Bay
- 53.2939°N 3.7265°W
- OS grid reference: SH 850,788
- Location: Abergele Road, Colwyn Bay
- Country: Wales
- Denomination: Anglican
- Website: Parish of Colwyn Bay and Bryn-y-Maen

History
- Status: Parish church
- Dedication: Saint Paul
- Consecrated: 13 July 1888

Architecture
- Functional status: Active
- Heritage designation: Grade II*
- Designated: 25 July 1994
- Architect: Douglas and Fordham
- Architectural type: Church
- Style: Gothic Revival
- Groundbreaking: 1887
- Completed: 1911

Specifications
- Capacity: 200

Administration
- Province: Wales
- Diocese: St Asaph
- Archdeaconry: St Asaph
- Deanery: Rhos
- Parish: Colwyn Bay with Bryn-Y-Maen

Clergy
- Vicar: Rev'd Christine Owen

St Paul's Church, Colwyn Bay is an active Anglican parish church in the town of Colwyn Bay, Wales. It is located in the Mission Area of Aled in the archdeaconry of St Asaph, and the Diocese of St Asaph. The church is designated by Cadw as a Grade II* listed building.

== History ==
The first religious building on the site was a mission room in 1872 which was replaced by an iron and timber church in 1880. This building was burnt down in 1886.

The present church was designed by the Chester firm of Douglas and Fordham and built in stages. The nave was built in 1887–88 and the chancel was added between 1894 and 1895. The tower was started in 1910 and completed the following year. It was the last major project to be undertaken by John Douglas but he died before it was completed. In 1920 a narthex with a west door, designed by W. D. Caroe, was added as a war memorial.

== Architecture and contents ==
The church is large and cruciform, built in coursed rubble limestone with Runcorn red sandstone dressings and bands. The nave of five bays is broad with low arcades and a tall clerestory. The windows are lancets, with a rose window in the south transept. The tower is "bold, craggy and heavily buttressed".

Internally there is a sedilia in the chancel, designed by Douglas. The stalls are carved with detail which is in "typical Douglas" style. The reredos and riddel posts, dating from 1934 to 1935, were designed by Caroe and are elaborately carved. Depicted on the reredos are representations of the Supper at Emmaus and the Annunciation together with figures of Saint Kentigern, Saint Asaph, St Aidan and the Venerable Bede. In the west window and in the two narthex windows is stained glass designed by Horace Wilkinson in 1920–21. The first stage of the organ was built by Peter Conacher and Son in 1888. It was completed when the nave was built in 1891 and rebuilt by John Cowin in 1960.

Edward Hubbard describes the church as "an extraordinary building" and suggests that it might be Douglas' "prodigy church of its decade".

== See also ==
- List of new churches by John Douglas
