= Eirias Park =

Park in Colwyn Bay, Wales

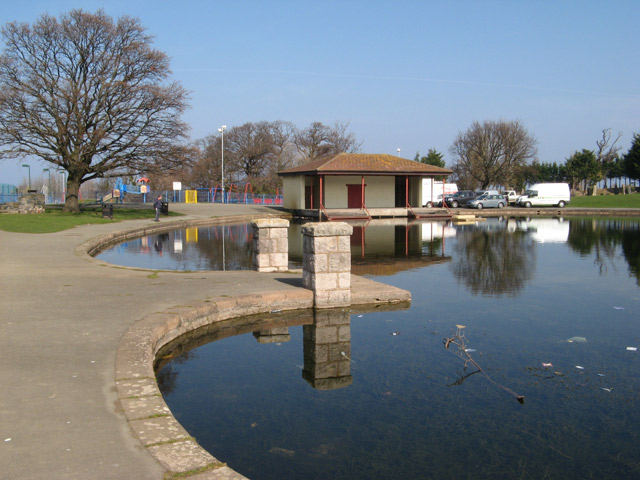
Eirias Park

Eirias Park (Welsh: Parc Eirias) is a 50-acre (20 ha) public park in Colwyn Bay, Conwy County Borough, Wales, was once described as "The park by the sea". The park has a sports complex, including the Eirias Stadium and Colwyn Leisure Centre.

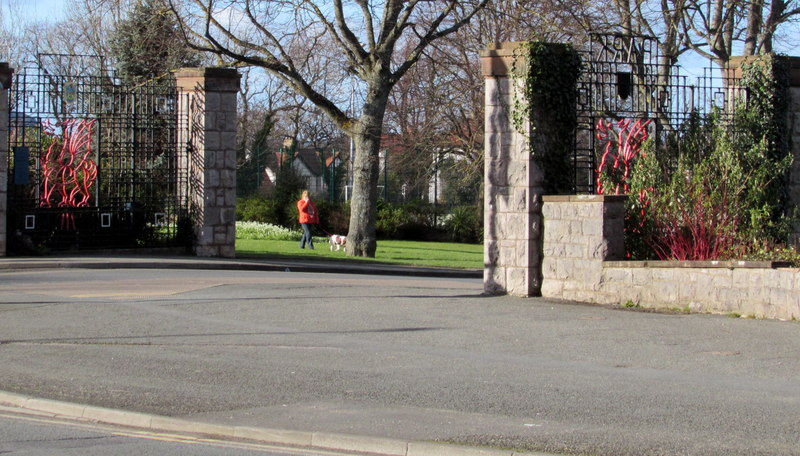
The southwest entrance to Eirias Park

== History ==
The park was created when the local council purchased 27-acre (11 ha) on 12 April, 1921 and the remainder of the park in 1929. The official opening of the playing fields took place on 27 September, 1923.

Situated within the park is the Colwyn Leisure Centre which was opened by Princess Margaret in 1981. Facilities include a six-lane 25-metre swimming/leisure pool with various water features and a separate water slide and the main sports hall. There is also a fitness suite, health suite, sauna, steam room and warm spa pool. The newly developed Eirias Events Centre, built in 2011, holds conference and classroom facilities for business and commerce events, as well as an indoor pitch, a gym and high performance sports analysis facility.

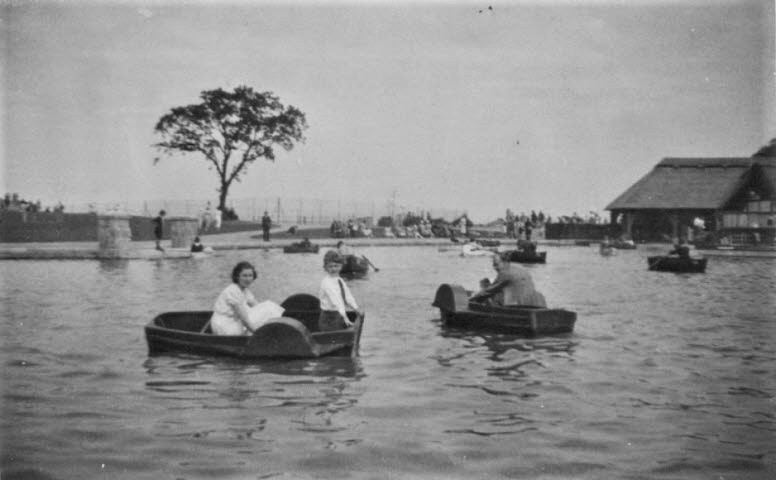
Eirias Park in 1935

Outdoor facilities within the complex, includes Eirias Stadium which opened in 1955 and was redeveloped in 2011 and stages local and international sporting events, a floodlit synthetic hockey/football playing area. Additional facilities include indoor and outdoor tennis courts, bowling greens, boating lake, children's playground and picnic area.
