= Old Colwyn =

Village in Conwy County Borough, Wales

Old Colwyn: Welsh: Hen Golwyn
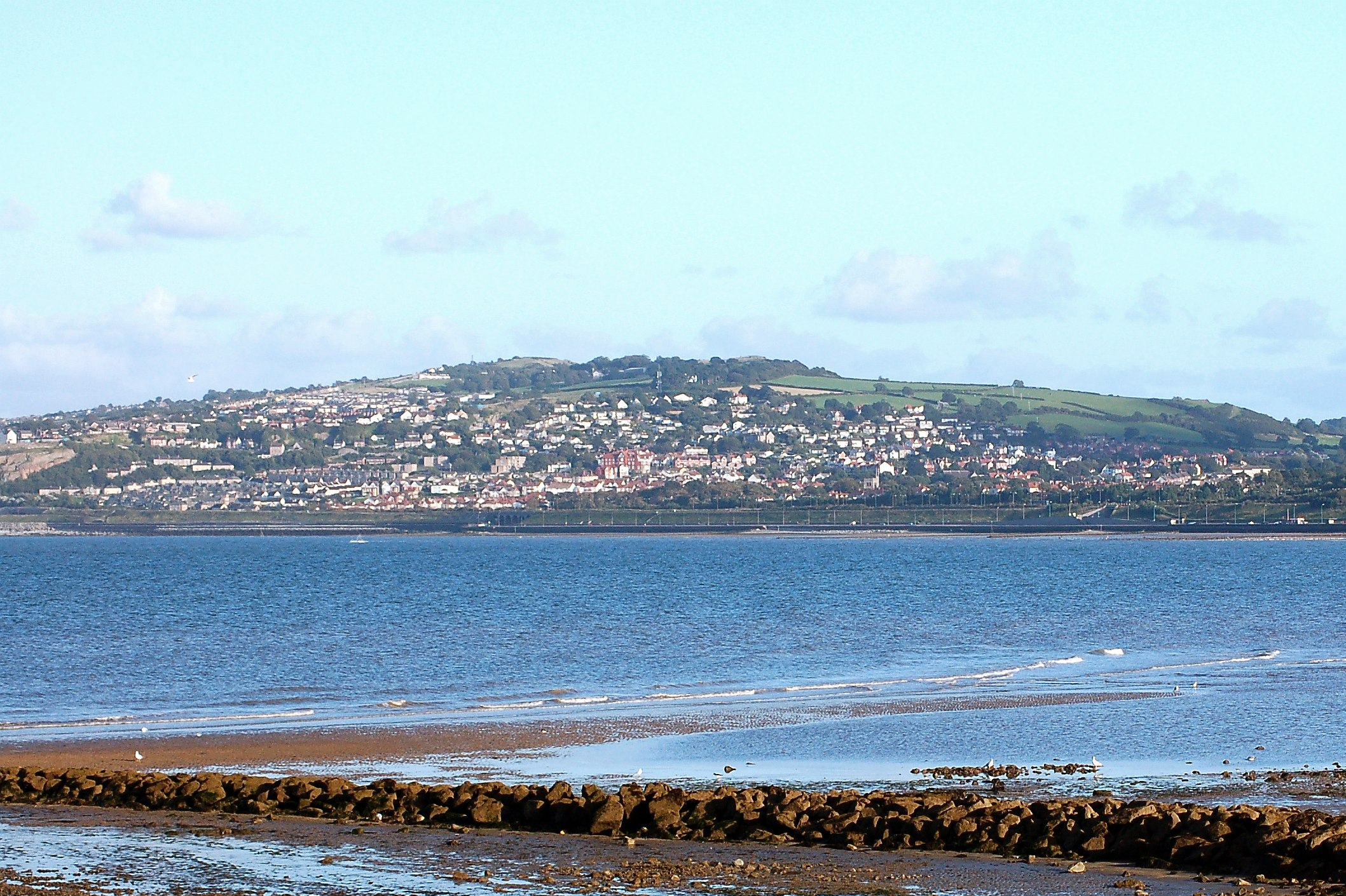
- Old Colwyn seen from Rhos-on-Sea

- Location within Conwy
- Population: 8,113 (2011)
- OS grid reference: SH864784
- Community: Old Colwyn
- Principal area: Conwy
- Preserved county: Clwyd
- Country: Wales
- Sovereign state: United Kingdom
- Post town: COLWYN BAY
- Postcode district: LL29
- Dialling code: 01492
- Police: North Wales
- Fire: North Wales
- Ambulance: Welsh
- UK Parliament: Clwyd North
- Senedd Cymru – Welsh Parliament: Clwyd West
- List of places UK Wales Conwy 53.291°N 3.704°W Map of the community

Old Colwyn (/ˈkɒlwɪn/; Welsh: Hen Golwyn [heːn ˈɡɔlʊɨn], formerly Colwyn bilingually) is a large village just to the east of Colwyn Bay, in Conwy County Borough, Wales.

Prior to local government reorganisation in April 1974 it was part of the Municipal Borough of Colwyn Bay, but the reorganisation established it as a separate community, whose population at the 2001 census was 7,626, increasing to 8,113 at the 2011 census. It hosted the National Eisteddfod in 1941. It also harbours the 3rd Colwyn Bay (Old Colwyn) Scout Group headquarters and is home to the area's comprehensive school, Ysgol Bryn Elian.

== Amenities ==
Old Colwyn has an area of woodland called the 'Fairy Glen'. This area of woodland is said to contain many different spirits including fairies, hence its name, which dates from the Victorian era and is a common name from that period (e.g. the "Fairy Glen" in Penmaenmawr). This area has recently undergone a regeneration with funding from the council and it is now possible to walk through it easily. The Fairy Glen is subject to an ownership dispute between Conwy County Borough Council and the water company, Dŵr Cymru, each claiming that the maintenance of the area is the responsibility of the other.

Old Colwyn was once overlooked by the Hotel 70 Degrees, (just above Tan-y-Lan) so named because the architect who designed it used 70 degree angles in its construction. Built in 1972, it was demolished in 2007, to be replaced by a housing development. It also has easy access onto the promenade and beach, as well as a protruded cliff area known as Penmaenhead, marked by a disused stone utility house. This is a popular spot amongst teenagers for the dangerous practice of "cliff jumping" when tide is in and the water is deep enough, though to date nobody has been hurt.

== History ==
In 1334, the village was mentioned in a government survey as "Coloyne".

In 1685, the village was known as "Colwun" and had a population of twenty.

Following the Census Act 1800, Colwyn had a population of 150 with twenty-three cottages, twelve farms and two inns.

St Catherine's Church was built in 1837 as a chapel-of-ease to Llandrillo-yn-Rhôs. A new ecclesiastical parish called Colwyn was created in 1844, with St Catherine's becoming the new parish church.

During the nineteenth century, the village of Colwyn became increasingly known as "Old Colwyn" to distinguish it from the newly formed town of Colwyn Bay (initially called "New Colwyn") to the west.

In 1884, Old Colwyn railway station opened (briefly initially named "Colwyn railway station") on the North Wales Coast Line.

In December 1952, the railway station closed; however, both the line and a street called "Station Road" remain.

Since 1984, (Note: with the exception of a two-year period, 1992–1994, when the Football Association of Wales prohibited their playing games in Wales whilst competing in the English football league system) Colwyn Bay Football Club's ground has been situated on Llanelian Road, Old Colwyn.

== Former tramway ==
The Llandudno and Colwyn Bay Electric Railway operated an electric tramway service between Llandudno and Rhos-on-Sea from 1907 and extended to Colwyn Bay in 1908. The service closed in 1956.

== Education ==
Old Colwyn has one infant school (Ysgol T. Gwyn Jones), one primary school (Ysgol Hen Golwyn), and one secondary school (Ysgol Bryn Elian).

== See also ==
- Borough of Colwyn
- St John the Baptist's Church, Old Colwyn

* Festival Church, Old Colwyn
