= Frederick Henry Rich =

British soldier (1824–1904)

- Born: 8 March 1824; Woodlands, Castleconnell, Ireland
- Died: 22 August 1904 (aged 80); Oareford, Somerset, England

Col. Frederick Henry Rich (8 March 1824 – 22 August 1904) was a British soldier, who served with the Royal Engineers and was the Chief Inspecting Officer of the Railway Inspectorate between 1885 and 1889. He investigated many of the major railway accidents in the late 19th century, including those at Staplehurst in 1865, in which the author Charles Dickens was involved, and at Norton Fitzwarren in 1890.

== Family ==
Rich was born on 8 March 1824 at Woodlands, Castleconnell near Limerick in Ireland, the son of John Sampson Rich (1789–1880) and Amelia née Whitfield (1801–1883).

== Military history ==
Gentleman Cadet Frederick Henry Rich joined the Corps of Royal Engineers as a second lieutenant on 11 January 1843. He was promoted to first lieutenant on 1 April 1846, to second captain on 17 February 1854 and to first captain on 23 February 1856.

During his early years with the Royal Engineers he had various postings in England, including Chatham, Woolwich, Devonport and Dover. He was posted to Ireland for a year in 1845, before being posted to Canada and then to the West Indies from August 1847 to January 1851. Between April 1851 and May 1859 he returned to Ireland followed by two years in Malta.

In April 1861, he was seconded to the Board of Trade as an Inspector of Railways, remaining in this post until October 1872, when he spent the last four months before his retirement at the War Office.

He was further promoted to brevet major on 24 August 1866 and to lieutenant-colonel on 8 May 1867. He retired on full pay on 1 February 1873 with the honorary rank of colonel.

== Inspector of Railways ==
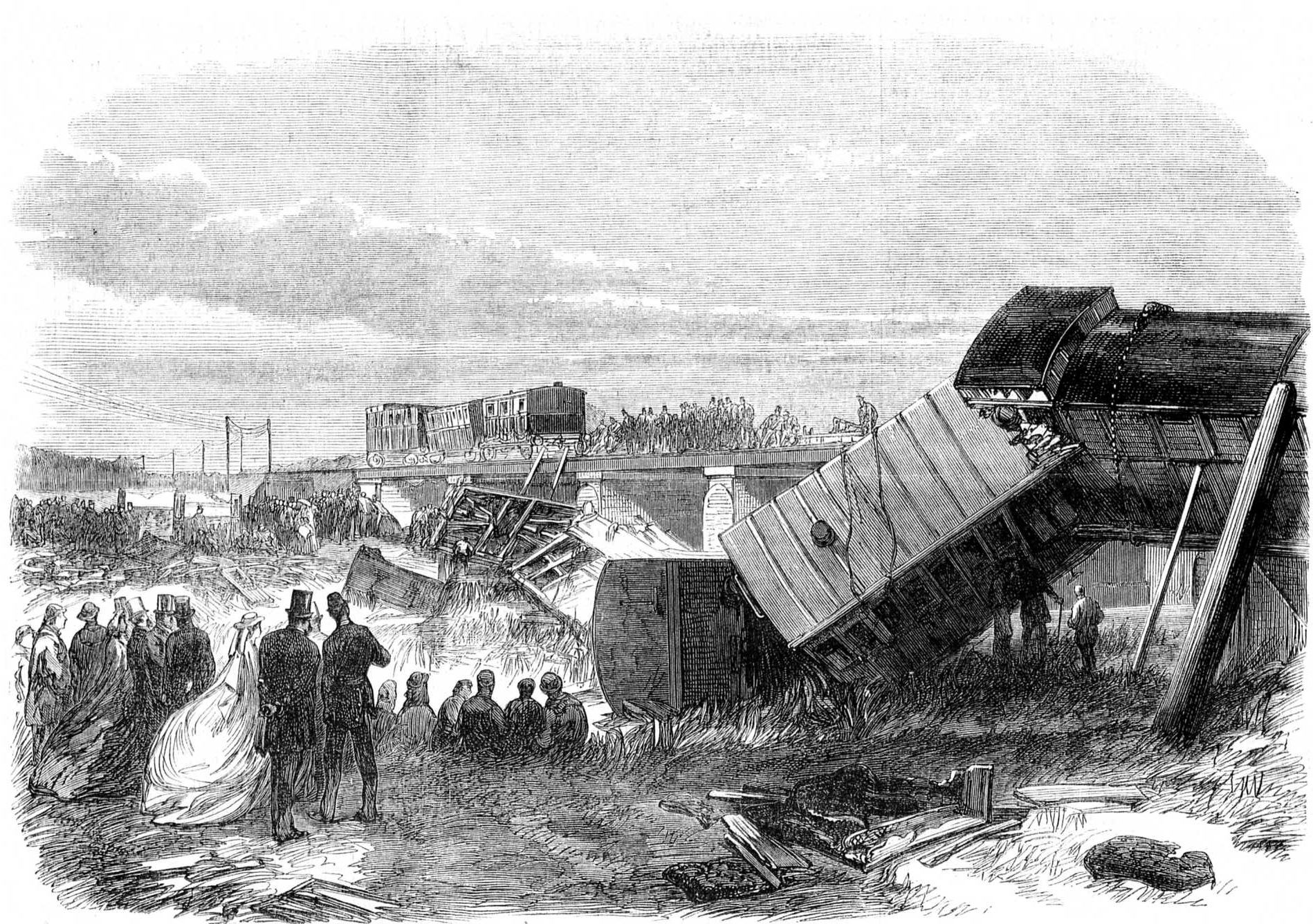
Staplehurst rail crash (Engraving in Illustrated London News)

Rich was initially seconded to the Board of Trade as an Inspector of Railways in 1861 but continued in this post after his retirement from the Royal Engineers, serving as Chief Inspecting Officer of the Railway Inspectorate between 1885 and 1889.

During his time with the Railway Inspectorate of the Board of Trade, Rich investigated in excess of 250 accidents. Rich was "noted for the great attention he pays to all details" in his investigations.

In June 1865, Rich investigated an accident at Staplehurst, in which a South Eastern Railway Folkestone to London boat train derailed while crossing a viaduct where a length of track had been removed during engineering works, killing ten passengers and injuring forty. The author Charles Dickens was travelling with Ellen Ternan and her mother on the train; they all survived the derailment. Dickens tended the victims, some of whom died while he was with them. The experience affected Dickens greatly; he lost his voice for two weeks and afterwards was nervous when travelling by train, using alternative means when available.

In October 1868, Rich reported on his investigation of the Abergele rail disaster in which 33 people were killed, making it at the time, the worst railway disaster in Britain. The accident was caused when the Irish Mail train collided with runaway wagons at Llandulas near Abergele.

At Stairfoot in South Yorkshire on 12 December 1870, a rake of runaway goods wagons collided with a passenger train resulting in 15 deaths and 59 injuries. In his report into the accident, Rich found that the goods guard at Barnsley was gravely at fault for not ensuring the standing wagons were better secured. The layout of the yard was also criticized as there were no trap points to protect the running lines in the event of such a mishap.

The train crash at Norton Fitzwarren occurred on 11 November 1890, at Norton Fitzwarren station on the Great Western Railway, approximately two miles south-west of Taunton in Somerset. A special boat train carrying passengers from Plymouth to Paddington collided with a goods train that was being shunted on the main line. Ten passengers were killed, and eleven people (including the driver and fireman of the special train) were seriously injured. Rich recommended "that all stations where there is much shunting, or where stopping trains are liable to be set aside for fast trains to pass, should be provided with refuge sidings" to avoid similar accidents.

As well as investigating railway accidents, Rich also inspected new railway lines and other works prior to their opening. These included the Faringdon branch of the GWR (May 1864), the Sidmouth Railway (June 1874), the Ribblehead Viaduct (May 1876) and the Severn Tunnel (November 1886). He inspected the Rhondda and Swansea Bay Railway Rhondda Tunnel in May 1890, prior to its planned official opening. He requested further brickwork to be installed. The contractors took six weeks and the Rhondda Tunnel opened on 2 July 1890 without any ceremony.

In September 1872, Rich investigated the explosion of a locomotive boiler at Bray in which the driver and firemen were killed.

=== List of major accidents investigated by F. H. Rich ===
Criteria for inclusion: Fatalities of 3 or more or injuries of 20 or more.

Date	Location	Fatalities	Injuries	Brief description	Cause	Inspector's report
10 June 1864	Curzon Street goods station, Birmingham	0	30	Head-on collision between of a passenger train and a goods train	Pointsman error	
29 October 1864	Ballinasloe	2	34	Derailment of a passenger train	Track defect and excessive speed	
9 June 1865	Staplehurst	10	40	Train ran over bridge where rails removed for work. Charles Dickens a passenger	Inadequate worksite protection	
15 July 1865	Peterborough	0	27	Runaway train, train misrouted, rear collision	Site staff error, failure to secure brakes	
16 September 1865	Wemyss Bay	0	76	Passenger train hit buffers at station	Excessive speed and failure to apply brakes properly	
2 November 1865	Stratford	0	25	Collision between two passenger trains in dense fog	Inadequate signalling arrangements, inadequate fog protection	
30 March 1866	New Cross	0	50	Collision between a stationary train and a moving train	Driver error	
4 September 1866	Surrey Canal Junction	0	25	Collision between a passenger train and a light engine	Driver error	
13 January 1867	Stonehaven	3	3	Collision between two light engines in snow	Station staff error and pilotman error	
7 March 1867	Bowling Tunnel	2	22	Collision between two passenger trains	Signaller error	
9 September 1867	Dove Holes Tunnel & New Mills	5	5	Collision of a cattle train with a ballast train and subsequent collision of the runaway portion of the cattle train with a passenger train	Signaller error	
27 February 1868	Arniston Colliery, Gorebridge	3	0	Collision between a goods train and an engine and brake van	Guard error	
20 August 1868	Abergele	33	NK	Irish Mail train hit unsecured wagons on the line	Runaway goods wagons	
24 October 1869	Welwyn Junction	3	NK	Derailment of a passenger train	Points split under train	
7 June 1870	Pleasington	2	27	Derailment of an excursion train	Tyre defect	
13 May 1871	Stairfoot	15	59	Collision between passenger train and runaway goods wagons	Shunter error and lack of continuous brakes	
12 December 1871	Belfast	2	55	Head-on collision between passenger train and goods train	Fireman intoxicated	
30 May 1872	Boghead Sidings, Paisley	0	29	Collision between a passenger train and a shunted goods train	Signal defect	
5 July 1872	Gilsland	4	1	Collision between an empty freight train and a ballast train	Excessive speed and failure to protect train	
3 August 1872	Agecroft sidings	4	15	Collision between an express train and a coal train	Signaller error	
3 July 1875	Scotsgap	4	25	Derailment of a passenger train	Defective coupling	
4 March 1890	Carlisle	4	15	Runaway passenger train collided with a light engine	Driver error	
8 November 1890	Norton Fitzwarren	10	12	Passenger train collided with a goods train that was being shunted on the main line	Signalling error	

== Wives and children ==
On 31 August 1848, he married Elizabeth Bayard (1826–1885) in Delaware, US. She was the daughter of Richard Henry Bayard, US Senator and Chief Justice of Delaware. They had nine children, including:

- Henry Bayard Rich (1849–1884), who played for the Royal Engineers in the 1872 FA Cup Final.
- Frederick St. George Rich (1852–1927), who served in the Royal Navy between 1877 and 1910, retiring with the rank of Vice-Admiral.
- Louisa Maud Rich (1854–1934), married Frederick Crooke who played cricket for Lancashire and Gloucestershire; their eldest child was Admiral Sir Henry Ralph Crooke CB, KBE (1875–1952) who had a long career in the Royal Navy, serving in both World Wars, including being captain of HMS Caroline at the Battle of Jutland in 1916.
- Amy Gertrude Rich (1866–1919), married William Neill, barrister, son of Henry James Neill of Rockport House, Co. Down, the owner of Gelston's Irish Whiskey and grandfather of John Whitley Neill Olympic hockey player and Director of Greenall Whitley & Co. Ltd.

Elizabeth Bayard Rich died on 20 October 1885. Frederick remarried in 1891 to Cecile d'Olier Gowan, who survived him, dying in Bournemouth on 15 December 1926.

Frederick Henry Rich died at Oareford, near Oare, Somerset, on 22 August 1904, leaving an estate of over £92,000.
