= Stairfoot rail accident =

1870 railway incident in England

Details
- Date: 12 December 1870
- Location: Stairfoot station, near Barnsley
- Coordinates: 53.5452°N 1.4376°W
- Country: England
- Line: Manchester, Sheffield and Lincolnshire Railway
- Cause: Failure to secure standing wagons

Statistics
- Trains: 2
- Deaths: 15
- Injured: 59

The Stairfoot rail accident was a railway accident that took place at Stairfoot, West Riding of Yorkshire, England.

== Details of accident ==
On 12 December 1870, in Barnsley top yard a rake of 10 goods wagons was standing on a gradient of 1 in 119. A single sprag between the spokes of a wheel was holding them. When two gas tank wagons were shunted against the rake, the sprag broke and the 12 wagons began to move. Two pointsmen made valiant efforts to pin down the brakes to no avail. The wagons rapidly gathered speed as the gradient increased to 1 in 72 and passed three signal boxes, none of which had points under their control to deflect the runaways. Meanwhile, a passenger train which had left Barnsley at 18:15 was standing at Stairfoot station one and a half miles away. The runaways struck the rear of the standing train at a speed of at least 40 mph, killing 15 and injuring 59 more.

The enquiry by Lieut-Col F. H. Rich found that the goods guard was gravely at fault for not ensuring the standing wagons were better secured. The layout of the yard was also criticized as there were no trap points to protect the running lines in the event of such a mishap.

== Similar accidents ==
- Abergele rail disaster (1868)

== Sources ==
- Rolt, L. T. C.; Kichenside, Geoffrey (1982) [1955]. Red for Danger (4th ed.). Newton Abbot: David & Charles. pp. 184–186. ISBN 0-7153-8362-0.
