= Abergele rail disaster =

1868 Welsh railway disaster

Coordinates: 53.29108°N 3.6294°W

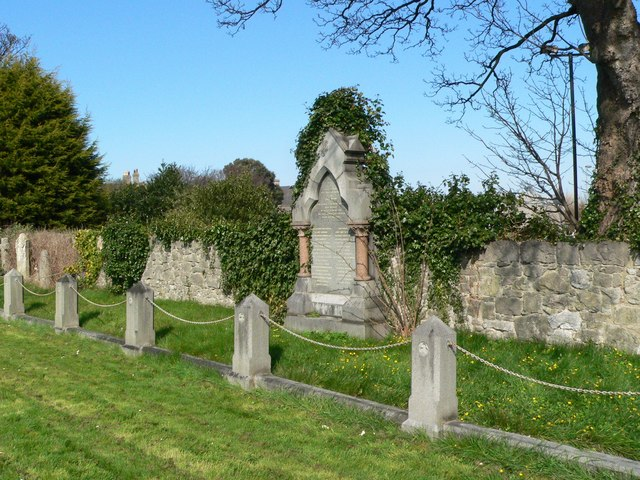
- Abergele rail disaster memorial

Details
- Date: 20 August 1868
- Location: Abergele, Conwy.
- Country: Wales
- Line: North Wales Coast Line
- Cause: Runaway goods wagons

Statistics
- Trains: 2
- Deaths: 33

The Abergele rail disaster took place near Abergele, North Wales, in August 1868. At the time, it was the worst railway disaster to have occurred in Great Britain.

The Irish Mail train was on its way from London to Holyhead. At Llanddulas—the nearest sidings to Abergele—a complicated shunting operation was blocking the main line. In the confusion a brake-van and six wagons loaded with paraffin were left uncoupled on a gradient leading down to Abergele. A collision with other wagons caused these to run downhill into the path of the Irish Mail train, the casks of paraffin bursting on impact and catching fire, engulfing the passenger train.

Flames and smoke made rescue impossible and 33 people died in the crash, some of them burned beyond recognition. The inquest blamed the two brakemen on the goods train, who had failed to properly secure the wagons, as well as the stationmaster at Llanddulas who was supervising the operation. The Board of Trade also strongly criticised the London and North Western Railway for poor practices.

== Narrative ==
=== The Irish Mail ===
On 20 August 1868, at 7.30 a.m., the London and North Western Railway's down day Irish Mail train left the LNWR's London terminus, Euston Station, for Holyhead. One of the railway's most powerful engines, Prince of Wales , (Note: Clearly from contemporary pictures of the crash a 2-2-2 and therefore presumably one of the 'Problem' class (as illustrated at)) hauled behind it a chief guard's van, a travelling post office (mail van and tender), a luggage van, four passenger carriages, and a second guard's van at the rear of the train. At 11.30 a.m. in Chester, four more passenger carriages were attached immediately behind the front guard's van; the train then set off for Holyhead, its next scheduled stop, via the North Wales Coast Line (Chester and Holyhead Railway). At about 12.39 p.m. the train passed through Abergele at about 40 miles per hour (~64 km/h). (Note: A young boy who saw it said he thought "it was doing 60 miles an hour" (96 km/h), and was quoted to support suggestions of excessive speed – but the accuracy/reliability of that estimate is doubtful, as the "Problem" class is otherwise noted as peaking around 70 mph (113 km/h) down relatively steep grades, and at the time the 35 mile (~56 km) rail distance between Chester and Abergele generally took about an hour to traverse, along a relatively flat coastal line.) Following a late start from Euston, and a further slight delay in Chester, it was about 5 minutes late overall; by that time it should already have been 3 miles (5 km) further on and passing Llanddulas.

=== The goods train ===
Ahead of it, a 'pick-up' goods train 43 wagons long had left Abergele at 12.15 p.m. on the same line; to clear the down line (Note: The line on which traffic goes away from London – in this case from Chester to Holyhead and the more southerly of the lines (UK trains 'drive on the left').) for the express, the goods train was to be put into sidings at Llanddulas until the express had passed.

At Llanddulas, there were two sidings (Llysfaen sidings), (Note: The station was later renamed as Llysfaen and (in 1870) provided with a signal box; In 1931, Llysfaen railway station closed, but the signal box was not removed until 1983 as it served sidings used by the ICI lime works.) serving a lime quarry to the south of the line. When the goods train reached them (about 12.25 p.m.), both were partly occupied by goods wagons ('cargo trucks', or freight cars) and consequently neither siding could take the entire goods train. Under the direction of the Llanddulas stationmaster, therefore, the brake van and the last six wagons of the goods train were uncoupled and left on the main down line (protected by the distant signal for Llanddulas). Rather than simply shunting the rest of the train into one of the sidings and returning for the odd six, a series of 'loose shunting' (Note: Loose shuting is where wagons at the rear of the train are uncoupled and pushed by the train until they reach an adequate speed. The train then stops and the loose wagons continue forward with enough momentum to complete the intended move. The wagons are therefore not always fully under control, but correct execution saves time and demonstrates skill.) operations was embarked upon intended to put empty wagons (there were 26 in the train) into one of the sidings and accumulate a shorter train of loaded wagons on the main line ready to put into the other siding.

=== Runaway wagons ===
There were two brakesmen on the goods train; however, both men dismounted to take part in the shunting operations. The wagons did not have their own brakes applied, and so were held solely by the brake van – on a gradient of as much as 1 in 100, falling towards Abergele. The next set of loaded wagons were 'loose shunted' into the original wagons with such force as to jostle the brake van and release its own unsecured brake, (Note: In fact, Colonel Rich suspected the collision was sharp enough to shear off several gear teeth from the brake handle mechanism, as per the state in which it was later discovered, so it would have made no difference even if the handle had been properly secured (e.g. by a chain).) and the wagons moved off in the direction of Abergele. The brake van was unoccupied, and no-one was able to catch up with it in order to board it and reapply the brake; (Note: Again, even if they had it may not have made any difference, with a presumably broken brake linkage leaving any would-be saviour no more than a hapless passenger.) the runaway wagons disappeared out of sight around a curve in the line. The next thought was to reverse the engine towards Abergele and retrieve the wagons, but this intention was quickly overtaken by the succeeding events.

=== Collision ===
About 1 3/4 mi (2.8 km) beyond Abergele, Arthur Thompson, the engine driver of the Irish Mail, saw some wagons no more than 200 yards (~200 metres) in front, emerging from around a curve in the steep cutting at that point. (Note: Not the same curve as that at Llanddulas, but the next one reversing its effect. A later photograph of another member of the same class of engine suggests that on any curve to the right the body of his engine would have hidden the wagons from him.) He initially thought the wagons were on the up line, "but immediately afterwards perceived that they were running towards him on the down line on which he was travelling". He promptly shut off steam, and the fireman, who had also seen the hazard, applied his brake. Thompson prepared to jump clear and called to his fireman "For God’s sake Joe, jump; we can do no more". (Note: Strictly speaking, he should also have used the steam whistle to signal to the guards to apply their brakes, but clearly they could not have done so in time.) Thompson then jumped; Joe, his fireman, did not.

The Irish Mail is thought to have been doing 28–30 mph (45–50 km/h) when it hit the wagons, which were probably travelling at 12–15 mph (20–25 km/h) towards it at impact. The force of the collision derailed the engine, its tender and the leading guard's van. The engine ran on about 30 yards and overturned to the left; the tender overturned to the right and ended up fouling the up line, along which the up (London-bound) Irish Mail was soon due to pass. (Note: Colonel Rich says it should have reached Llanddulas by 12.34 p.m.; clearly, it too was running late.)

However, the heavy loss of life resulting from the crash was caused less by the impact itself, and more by the load of the two runaway wagons next to the brake van, which carried 50 wooden barrels, holding about 1,700 gallons (~7,750 litres) of paraffin oil between them. This oil would have been of a slightly different kind from modern kerosene but with similar flammability (its 'igniting point' (Note: The flammability parameter normally quoted these days is flash point (the temperature at which vapour above the liquid is flammable) but the less frequently quoted fire point is sometimes referred to as the 'ignition point' since it is the temperature at which surface burning can be sustained. Both parameters depend on the apparatus in which they are measured. It is not clear what criterion was used in the determination of the 'igniting point' quoted by Colonel Rich, and it is unlikely to have been measured in apparatus closely matching that used in modern determinations.) is noted as 137 °F (58 °C) in the report) and uses (oil lamps etc.). (Note: This was produced at Saltney outside Chester (which is why such a large (for the period) quantity was on the goods train) by refining liquids produced by the dry distillation of cannel coal from the Flintshire coalfield, as opposed to latterday paraffin (kerosene) produced by refining crude oil, but it was for most intents interchangeable with such.)

=== Fire, casualties, and Lord Hamilton's testimony ===
Some of the barrels broke up in the collision, and their contents caught fire. The engine, tender, guard's van and the first three-passenger carriages were instantly enveloped in dense smoke and flames, which soon spread to the fourth carriage and the front of the leading post office van. This prevented any immediate attempt to rescue the occupants of the first four carriages, who all died, together with the guard in the front guard's van and the locomotive's fireman.

"We were startled by a collision and a shock. [...] I immediately jumped out of the carriage, when a fearful sight met my view. Already the three passenger carriages in front of ours, the vans and the engine were enveloped in dense sheets of flame and smoke, rising fully 20 feet. [...] [I]t was the work of an instant. No words can convey the instantaneous nature of the explosion and conflagration. I had actually got out almost before the shock of the collision was over, and this was the spectacle which already presented itself. Not a sound, not a scream, not a struggle to escape, or a movement of any sort was apparent in the doomed carriages. (Note: A platelayer's wife from a nearby cottage asserted to the contrary, that she had spoken to women in the forward carriages, urging them to get out, and been told to mind her own business. The driver thought that while attempting to uncouple the other carriages, he had heard such a conversation but gave a markedly different account of it. Other (lower-class) witnesses were reported to give similarly vaguely supportive accounts, but were not called upon by the inquiry. "Several gentlemen who were passengers by the train" and, the Colonel says "appeared much more competent to give a clear account of the events" gave accounts similar to the marquess, and these were preferred by the Colonel. His report suggests that the witness was mistaken as to which carriage she had spoken to the occupants of, which seems a plausible explanation. It also allows him to conclude that a well-connected nobleman was not mistaken, and that the dead cannot have suffered; both more desirable findings than the alternative...) It was as though an electric flash had at once paralysed and stricken every one of their occupants. So complete was the absence of any presence of living or struggling life in them that [...] it was imagined that the burning carriages were destitute of passengers."

Local farm labourers and quarry workers eventually formed a bucket chain to fetch water from the sea 200 yards (~200 metres) away to put out the fire in these carriages; when they did the victims were found to be burnt beyond recognition, reduced to mere "charred pieces of flesh and bone". Three of them were later identified by their personal effects. (Note: The victims included Lord Farnham (a statue to his memory now stands outside the new Johnston Central Library on Farnham Street in Cavan Town), whose watch was found near a body. The coroner was criticised for refusing to accept this as adequate evidence that the body was that of Lord Farnham, but was vindicated by advice from a surgeon that the body was that of a woman.) The victims were buried in a mass grave in St Michael's churchyard in Abergele, with the London & North Western Railway Company paying all funeral expenses.

The engine driver, Arthur Thompson, survived the collision, but was wounded by flying splinters; he died in October the same year from a pre-existing condition (ulcerated bowels), the inquest upon him concluding that his death had been hastened by his injuries in the accident. The post office workers in the travelling post office escaped, with some of the mail, but the leading post office van was destroyed by fire. There were no deaths or even serious injuries in the carriages behind the post van, and the carriages themselves were successfully detached and saved from the fire.

A first-class passenger, (Note: The Marquess of Hamilton, son of The 1st Duke of Abercorn, the Lord Lieutenant of Ireland. During the inquest, the coroner received an anonymous letter claiming that the 'accident' was in fact a Fenian outrage intended to assassinate the wife and family of the Lord Lieutenant. The inquest did not find any evidence to support this, nor has any emerged since.) possibly the Marquess of Hamilton, CB, MP, a Lord of the Bedchamber to Albert Edward, Prince of Wales, and/or labourers sent by the surviving guard, ran to Llanddulas to warn of the accident, and the up 'Irish Mail' was successfully held there. Lord Hamilton, the Tory MP for County Donegal in Ulster, was the eldest son of His Excellency The 1st Duke of Abercorn, the Lord Lieutenant of Ireland; Abercorn had only been raised to a dukedom some ten days beforehand. The surviving passengers resumed their journey at 6 p.m. the same day (as did the up 'Irish Mail').

There were more than one dozen casualties part identified, including both The 7th Baron Farnham, KP, an Anglo-Irish peer, and his wife, Baroness Farnham. Her jewels were found and valued at £6,000. Much coinage gold and silver were melted together from the heat. The deceased were recognised by the artefacts which included two locks from guns, scissors, one Bible and the metalwork from suitcases.

The Railway News said of the incident:

"No other collision has ever yet, in this country at least, been attended with such a loss of life, nor presented such horrifying features. The crashing of the engine and carriages into a heap of splinters, each of which wounds unfortunate passengers like a sword, is horrible enough to contemplate; but when fire in its fiercest form is added to the scene, no more frightful occurrence could be imagined."

=== Inquest and prosecutions ===
At the subsequent inquest, the two brakesmen of the goods train did not give evidence (on legal advice), and the coroner's jury returned a verdict of manslaughter against them. The jury also strongly censured the station master at Llanddulas for allowing shunting when the express was expected imminently, contrary to the LNWR's rules. The brakesmen were tried for manslaughter at Ruthin assizes the following spring, but acquitted. From contemporary press accounts, at the assizes the judge's charge to the grand jury gave a strong indication that the brakesmen were – or should have been – under the control of a superior officer: the Llanddulas stationmaster. He then instructed the jury that they should consider if the brakesmen were under the control of the stationmaster, and if there was culpable negligence, whose was the negligence? Despite this, the jury returned a true bill, and the brakesmen were tried the next day, the trial jury retiring for less than 10 minutes before returning a verdict of 'Not Guilty'.

== Lessons ==
=== Railway inspector's report ===
The Board of Trade inspector, Colonel Frederick Henry Rich, issued his report within a month of the accident. He found that:

- The immediate cause of the accident was the failure of the senior brakesman to apply the individual wagon brakes on the six detached wagons;
- The brake van's brake had been broken by loose shunting of loaded wagons into the six wagons at too high a speed; the secondary cause was the failure of the senior brakesman to moderate their speed by applying wagon brakes, and;
- The station master at Llanddulas was very culpable in not having directed the goods train into the sidings as soon as it arrived at Llanddulas.

However, his analysis went beyond that of the inquest jury; (Note: This was far from uncommon; in his official report on the Brockley Whins accident in 1870, another inspector said of the inquest verdict that it supplied "further confirmation, if any were needed, of the fact that coroner's inquests, as generally conducted, are singularly ill calculated to ascertain the real causes of railway accidents; but they are supposed to be sometimes serviceable... to the railway companies, in concealing the mismanagement of the company from the public") he considered that these failings did not excuse the LNWR, and to some extent were its responsibility.

"So far, the three men are seriously to blame, and their neglect has been the immediate cause of the accident, but men of that class cannot be expected to do their duties well if the railway companies do not give them the most convenient and best appliances, and do not look after them strictly and enforce their own regulations."

He then criticised the LNWR on a number of points:

- The section of line was being run on the interval system (Note: Similar to scheduling/timetabling - essentially, if a train has left a station, it is given a certain amount of head-start time before another train of similar speed is allowed to follow it on the same line (similar to a signal that automatically changes to red as a train passes, and will not show green again for at least, say, the next ten minutes). There are some obvious flaws in this system, most of which were explored on British railways (see for example Rolt & Kichenside (1982) on the subject)) in a way which was "much to be condemned". The intervals allowed appeared wholly inadequate, particularly for a powerful passenger/mail express being expected to follow a mixed goods working, along a section containing a 1 in 100 gradient – not to mention the need for shunting of goods wagons at Llanddulas to allow the express past. (Note: Although the two trains would have been at least notionally protected from each other by the Llanddulas signal being set to "danger", the mail train might be routinely expected to halt at this signal whilst the goods wagons were manoeuvred into the sidings instead of being able to pass by at full speed. This suggests such tight timings were at least, even if not dangerous, rather counterproductive in terms of overall journey time and fuel use.) He recommended (Note: The Railway Inspectorate had been set up to inspect the civil engineering works of railways, and had clear powers in regard to this; on other matters – except where subsequently given additional powers by Parliament – they could only recommend, exhort, encourage and publicise. They felt this to be appropriate, as it kept all responsibility for safety clearly with the railway companies) that on the section in question, and any others like it, "the block telegraph system should be put strictly in force"; (Note: The LNWR already had the telegraph and block working on the London – Rugby main line, but it was "permissive"; where a block was not known to have been cleared by the previous train but there was as yet no reason to believe it wouldn't be, the block could be entered at reduced speed – a system that itself has obvious flaws.Rolt)
- Llanddulas station and Llysfaen sidings had never been inspected by a Government official or been approved by the Board of Trade. They were "quite unfit" to be used at the same time to support both the quarry operations and accommodation of slower trains to allow expresses to pass them. He recommended that an additional siding large enough to accommodate any train being passed should be provided, and kept free from quarry traffic;
- The LNWR "appeared to have a very slack system of supervision", with nobody to look after guards, train them, or monitor their performance;
- Dangerous materials were included in normal goods trains with no greater care taken of them than of other cargoes. He recommended that they should be sent by separate "special" trains, with additional precautions observed;
- The practice of locking the doors of passenger carriages from the outside. He recommended that all doors be left unlocked.

He then returned to his previous point which he saw as a simple question of discipline:

"Lastly, I fear that it is only too true that the rules printed and issued by railway companies to their servants, and which are generally very good, are made principally with the object of being produced when accidents happen from the breach of them, and that the companies systematically allow many of them to be broken daily, without taking the slightest notice of the disobedience..."

He then gave a number of examples, beginning:

"The breach of the regulation which led to this sad accident (viz. shunting within 10 minutes of the arrival of a passenger train) may be observed constantly at stations..."

...before ending:

"I must disavow any intention of taking advantage of this sad calamity to be severe on the London and North-Western Railway Company. I believe that their line is one of the best in the country, and that its general management and arrangements are as good, on the whole, as those of any of the other lines. But I desire to take advantage of the attention which this deplorable event will attract to bring before railway companies what I conceive to be the great defect in their systems, and which has led to most of the accidents I have inquired into, viz a want of discipline and the enforcing of obedience to their own rules."

=== Catchpoints ===
Although this was not one of the recommendations of the Board of Trade report, it became the practice for steep inclines to be fitted with runaway catchpoints so that runaway vehicles would be derailed and stopped before they had a chance to collide with following trains. These catchpoints became widespread, and only diminished in numbers when all rolling stock was fitted with continuous automatic brakes in the 1980s.

=== Petroleum Act 1879 ===
Not until 1879 was any legislation passed to regulate the carriage of flammable liquids by rail.

== Similar accidents ==
- Versailles rail accident (1842); wooden carriages which caught fire and cars locked from outside
- Stairfoot rail accident (1870)
- Chelford rail accident (1894); only vaguely similar but the accident report quotes LNWR rules on shunting brought in as a result of Abergele

=== Previous similar but minor accidents on North Wales Coast Line ===
- Penmaenmawr (1854) - goods train still shunting when express arrived - express overran 'distant' signal.
- Bangor (1856) - defective interval working - passenger train caught up with goods train - block working recommended.
- Penmaenrhos Tunnel (1859) - defective interval working - light engine caught up with goods train - block working recommended more strongly: covering letter concludes
  My Lords direct me to call the attention of the directors to the concluding recommendation of the inspecting officer as to the desirableness of working the line by means of the electric telegraph.

== See also ==
- List of British rail accidents
- Lists of rail accidents
