= RHL (disambiguation) =

RHL is a common abbreviation for Red Hat Linux, a Linux-based operating system superseded by RHEL

RHL may also refer to:

- Rembrandt's monogram on his works ("Rembrandt Harmenszoon [of] Leiden"?)
- Rhyl railway station, Wales, National Rail station code
