= Old Colwyn railway station =

Former railway station in Conwy, Wales

Old Colwyn
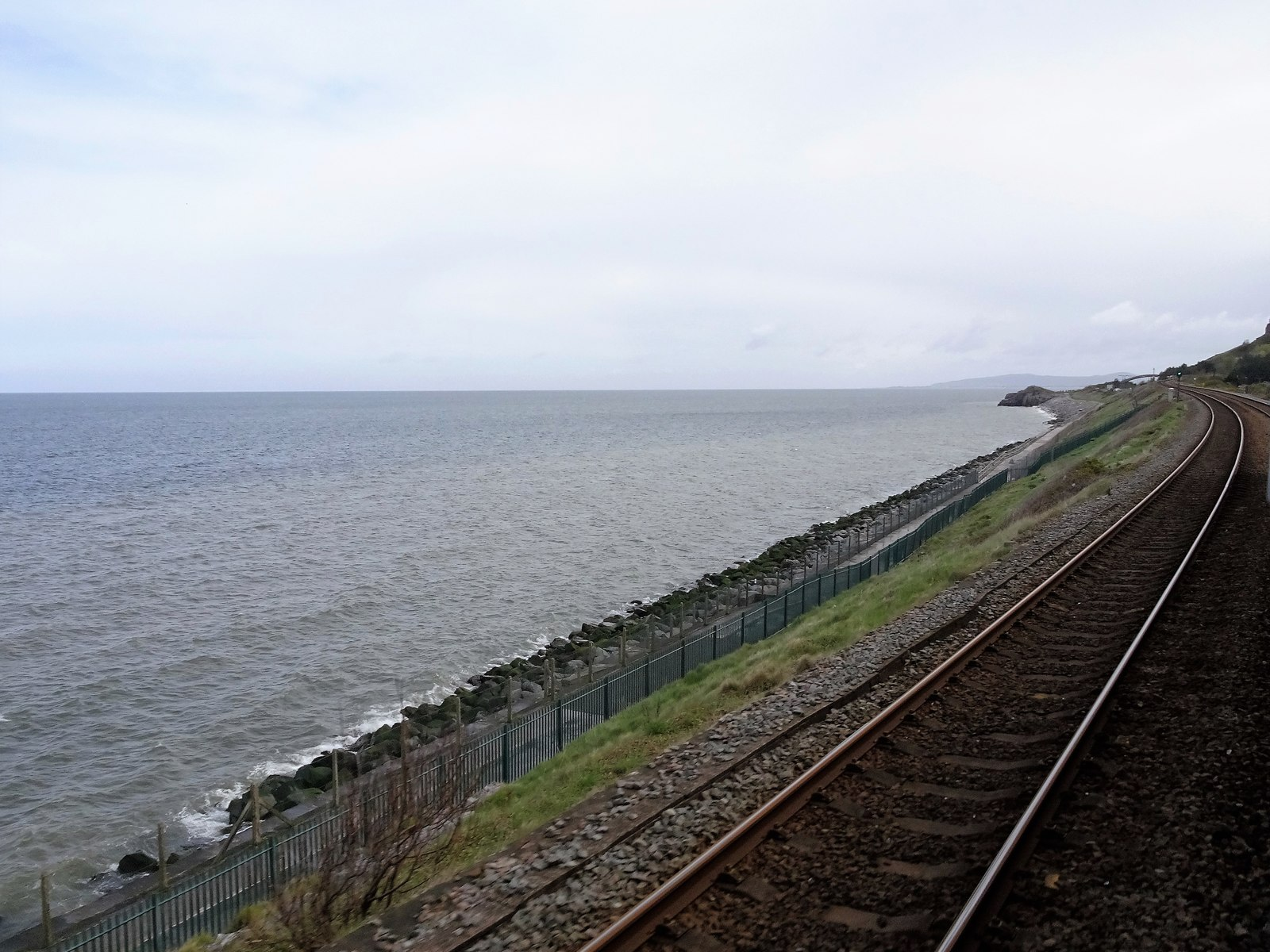
- The site of the station in 2018

General information
- Location: Old Colwyn, Conwy County Borough (then Denbighshire); Wales
- Coordinates: 53.2929°N 3.6923°W
- Grid reference: SH873787
- Platforms: 2

Other information
- Status: Disused

History
- Original company: London and North Western Railway
- Pre-grouping: London and North Western Railway
- Post-grouping: London, Midland and Scottish Railway

Key dates
- 9 April 1884: Opened as Colwyn
- 1 June 1885: Renamed Old Colwyn
- 1 December 1952: Closed to passengers
- 4 May 1964: Closed
Location

Old Colwyn railway station was located in Old Colwyn, Conwy County Borough (then Denbighshire), North Wales, situated between the town to the south and the Irish Sea to the north.

== History ==
The station was opened 9 April 1884 by the London and North Western Railway, it was served by what is now the North Wales Coast Line between Chester, Cheshire and Holyhead, Anglesey. Initially known as simply Colwyn station, it was changed to Old Colwyn in 1885 after passengers confused it with the next station along the line, Colwyn Bay.

The primary purpose for the opening of the station was to satisfy the demand caused by holidaymakers from the industrial cities of Liverpool, Manchester and the English Midlands. Located about a mile east of Colwyn Bay station, it consisted of two staggered platforms with waiting rooms on both, sidings and a coal yard. Due to its proximity to the other station, Old Colwyn was closed to passengers on 1 December 1952 and to goods traffic on 4 May 1964. The line through the station site is still in place and both passenger and freight services pass through regularly.

Preceding station	Historical railways	Following station
Llysfaen; Line open, station closed	London and North Western Railway; North Wales Coast Line	Colwyn Bay; Line and station open
