= Mynydd Marian =

Protected area in Clwyd, Wales

Coordinates: 53°16′53″N 3°39′58″W

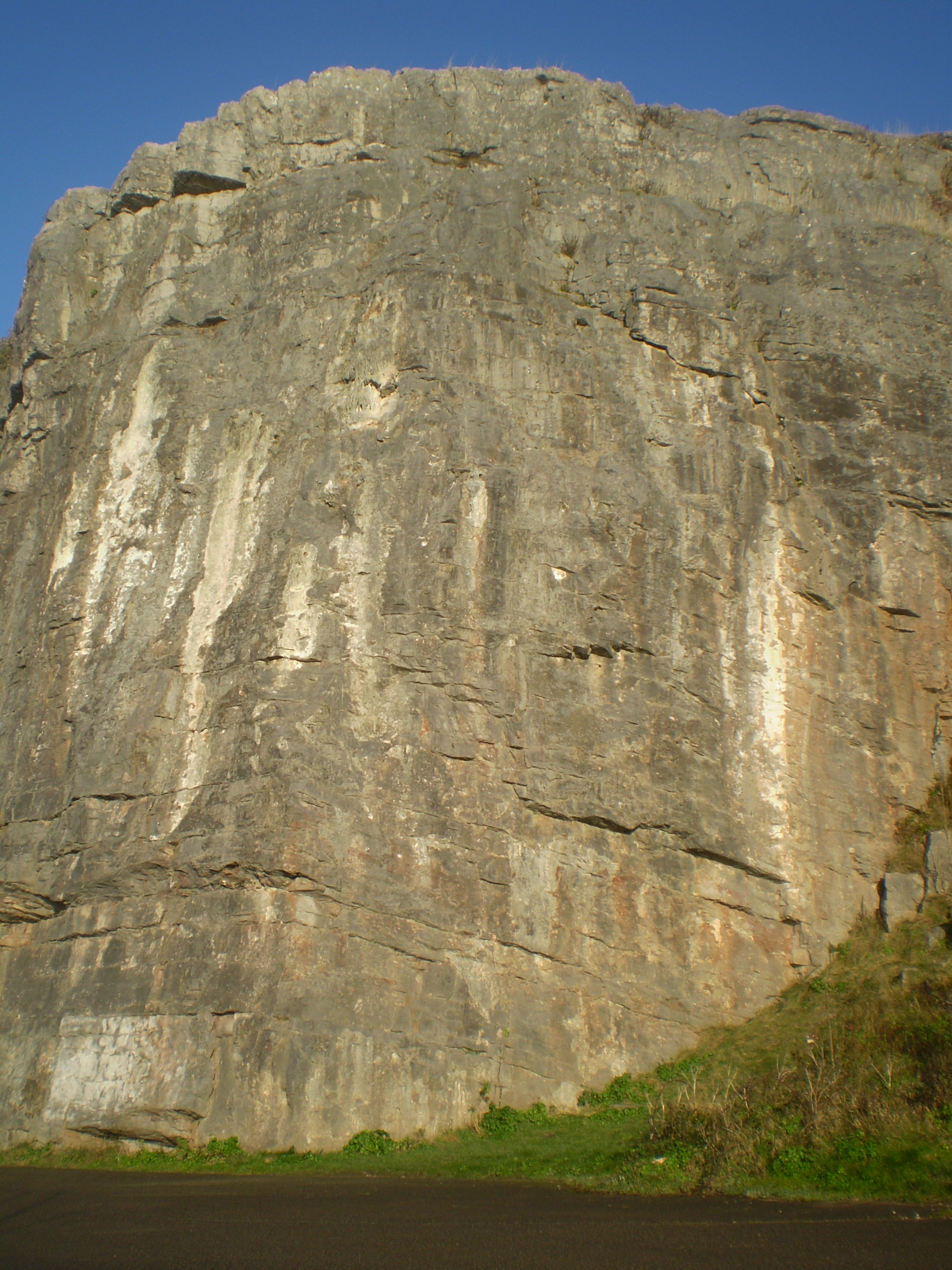
Cliff at Mynydd Marian

Mynydd Marian is a Site of Special Scientific Interest in Conwy, Wales. It is also a hill reaching a height of 208 metres (682 feet), with a trig point, and views to Snowdonia. It has high limestone cliffs which are popular with rock climbers. The village of Llysfaen lies on its southern slopes. Its elevation is 208.0 m (682 ft), there is a settlement with the same name, in 2018 it had an estimated population of 1122.

At the top of the hill, there is a house known as the Telegraph House, which was built in 1841. It was a part of a signaling stations chain that sent semaphore messages.

== See also ==
- List of Sites of Special Scientific Interest in Clwyd
