= Frederick Crooke =

English cricketer

Frederick James Crooke (21 April 1844 – 6 August 1923) was an English cricketer active from 1865 to 1875 who played for Lancashire and Gloucestershire. He was born in Liverpool and died in Southsea. He appeared in 21 first-class matches as a righthanded batsman who bowled right arm fast roundarm. He scored 573 runs with a highest score of 56 not out and took no wickets.

He was married to Louisa Maud Rich, the daughter of Col F. H. Rich; their eldest child was Admiral Sir Henry Ralph Crooke CB, KBE (1875–1952) who had a long career in the Royal Navy, serving in both World Wars, including being captain of HMS Caroline at the Battle of Jutland in 1916.
