= Wombwell Central railway station =

Disused railway station in South Yorkshire, England

Wombwell Central
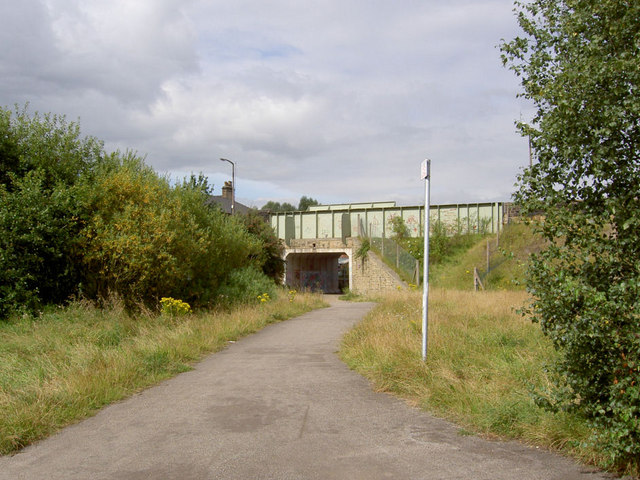
- Site of the former station (2007)

General information
- Location: Wombwell, Barnsley; England
- Coordinates: 53.5229°N 1.3932°W
- Grid reference: SE403030
- Platforms: 2

Other information
- Status: Disused

History
- Original company: South Yorkshire Railway
- Pre-grouping: Great Central Railway
- Post-grouping: London and North Eastern Railway

Key dates
- 1851: opened
- 29 June 1959: closed for passengers
- 6 January 1964: closed for freight
Location

Wombwell Central railway station was a railway station situated on the South Yorkshire Railway company's line between Mexborough and Barnsley. The station lay between Wath Central and Stairfoot. The station was built to serve the mining town of Wombwell, near Barnsley, South Yorkshire, England and was situated near to the Town Centre.

== History ==
The original Wombwell railway station was opened by the South Yorkshire Railway in September 1851 and was replaced by a new structure in the Manchester, Sheffield and Lincolnshire Railway's "Double Pavilion" style in the 1880s. It was closed when the Doncaster-to-Barnsley local passenger service was withdrawn on 29 June 1959.

== Accidents and incidents ==
- On 13 December 1911, a freight train ran away and was derailed at the station. Both locomotive crew were killed.

Preceding station	Disused railways	Following station
Wath Central	BR Eastern Region; Doncaster-Barnsley Line	Stairfoot
