= Monk Bretton railway station =

Former railway station in South Yorkshire, England

Monk Bretton
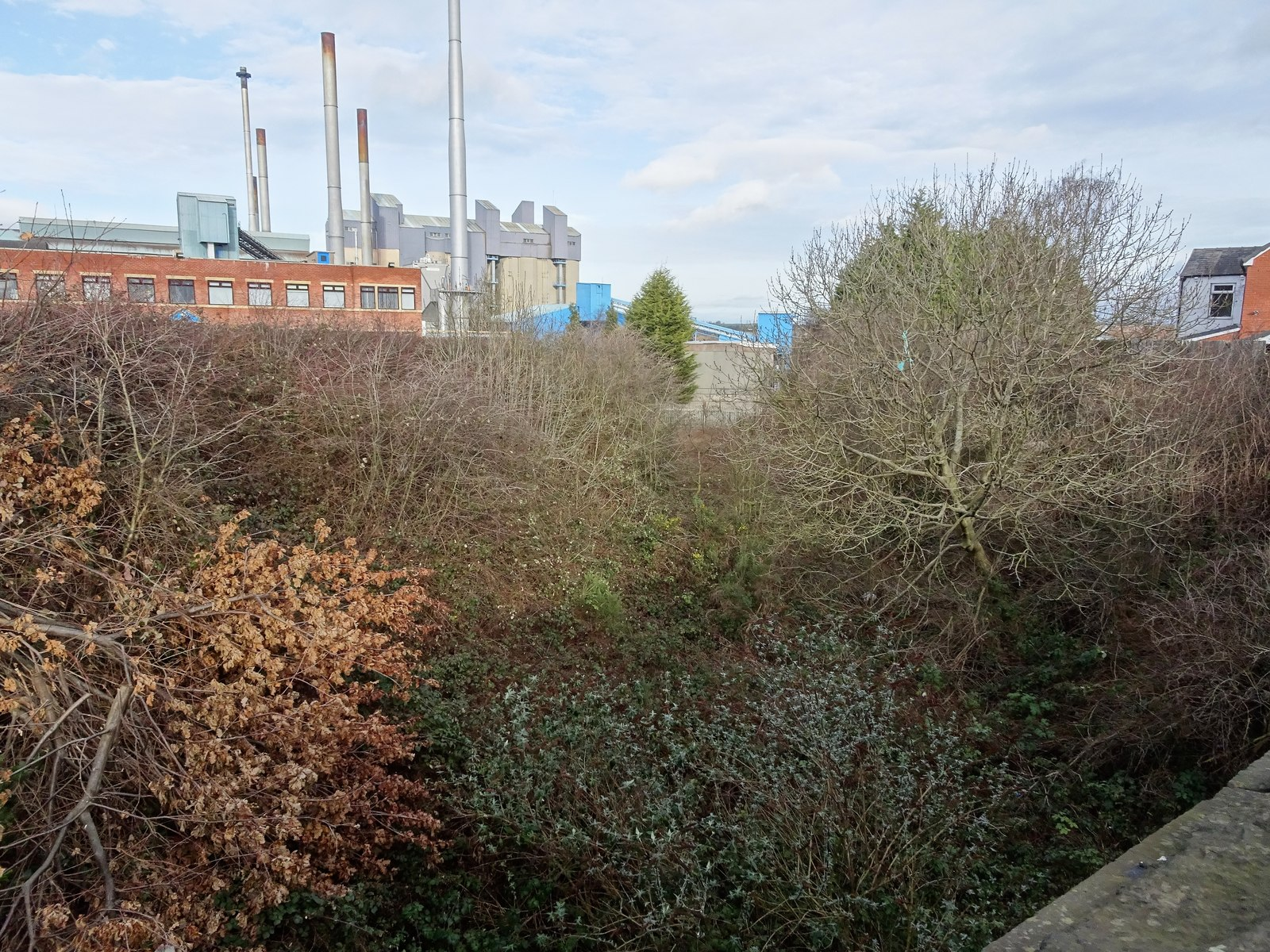
- The site of the station in 2018

General information
- Location: Monk Bretton, Barnsley; England
- Coordinates: 53.57068°N 1.43962°W
- Grid reference: SE372083
- Platforms: 2

Other information
- Status: Disused

History
- Pre-grouping: Midland Railway

Key dates
- 1 January 1876: opened
- 27 September 1937: closed
Location

Monk Bretton railway station was a railway station that served the village of Monk Bretton, South Yorkshire, England. It was opened in 1876 by the Midland Railway, built in their characteristic country style and was located on the line between Barnsley Court House and Cudworth. The station was double track with two flanking platforms approached from the nearby road over bridge, the main buildings being on the Barnsley bound platform. A signal box, in typical Midland Railway design, was situated at the outer end of the Cudworth platform.

The station was closed on 27 September 1937, though the line to Monk Bretton remained open and now serves a glassworks in the village, where the line stops.
