= Wath Central railway station =

Disused railway station in South Yorkshire, England

Wath Central
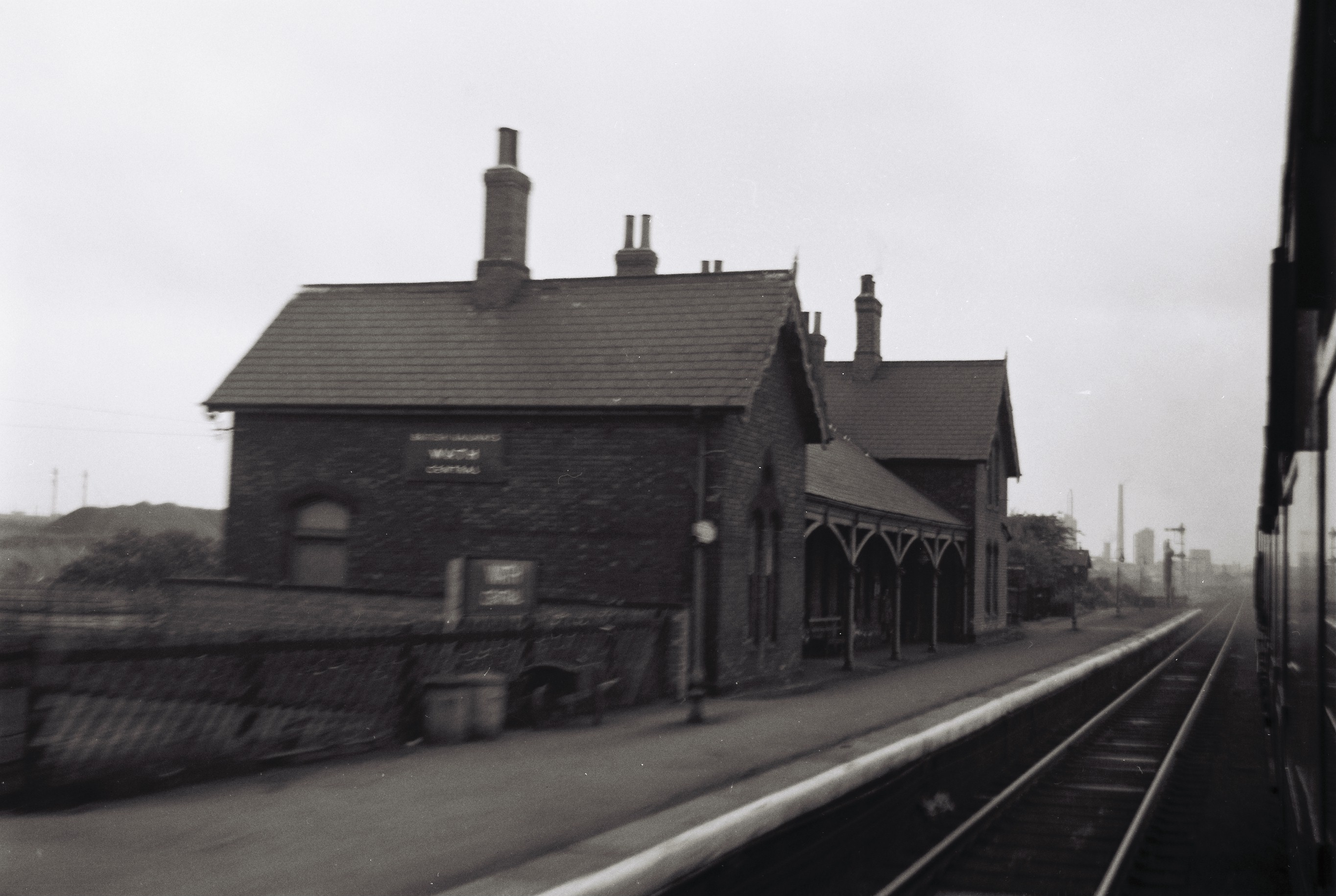

General information
- Location: Wath-upon-Dearne, Rotherham; England
- Coordinates: 53.5057°N 1.3356°W
- Grid reference: SE441012
- Platforms: 2

Other information
- Status: Disused

History
- Original company: South Yorkshire Railway
- Pre-grouping: Great Central Railway
- Post-grouping: London and North Eastern Railway

Key dates
- 1 July 1851: Opened as Wath
- 1 July 1907: Name changed to Wath-on-Dearne
- 25 September 1950: Name changed to Wath Central
- 29 June 1959: Closed
Location

Wath Central railway station was on the South Yorkshire Railway's Doncaster–Barnsley Exchange line in England. It was the closest of Wath-upon-Dearne's three railway stations to the town centre, lying immediately to its north-east, over the Dearne and Dove Canal bridge. The station was closed when local passenger services on the line ended on 29 June 1959. (The line continued to be used for freight traffic until 1988).

The buildings were in the Manchester, Sheffield and Lincolnshire Railway's large "Double Pavilion" style, an indication that rebuilding had taken place in the last quarter of the 19th century. The main building, with four bays, was on the Doncaster-bound platform. The station buildings were not demolished until the area was cleared during road improvement works in 2004.

Preceding station	Disused railways	Following station
Mexborough	BR Eastern Region; Doncaster-Barnsley Line	Wombwell Central
