= Listed buildings in Stairfoot =

Stairfoot is a ward in the metropolitan borough of Barnsley, South Yorkshire, England. The ward contains ten listed buildings that are recorded in the National Heritage List for England. All the listed buildings are designated at Grade II, the lowest of the three grades, which is applied to "buildings of national importance and special interest". The ward is to the southeast of the centre of Barnsley, and contains the village of Ardsley. The listed buildings consist of houses and associated structures, a canal bridge, a former water mill, two cemetery chapels, former colliery buildings, and a memorial to a colliery disaster.

== Buildings ==
Name and location	Photograph	Date	Notes
726 Doncaster Road and barn 53.54685°N 1.42098°W	—	16th or 17th century	A house, a former cottage and a former barn. The barn is the oldest, it is timber framed and later encased in stone, and has a stone slate roof, and two internal bays. The house and cottage are in stone with roofs of Welsh slate. The house has two storeys and an attic, altered openings, and gable copings on cut kneelers. The cottage is at right angles, and has two storeys, a blocked doorway and altered windows.
Bradberry Balk Bridge; 53.53048°N 1.40826°W	—	c. 1800	The bridge carries Bradberry Balk Lane over the course of the Dearne and Dove Canal. It is in sandstone, and consists of a single rusticated elliptical arch. The bridge has voussoirs, a rusticated soffit, and projecting end piers.
Ardsley Manor House and Cottage; 53.54653°N 1.41972°W	—	17th century (probable)	A manor house, it was much altered in the 19th century, and has been divided into two. It is in stone with a stone slate roof, and two storeys. In the right return is a doorway with a chamfered quoined surround. There are two mullioned windows with hood moulds, and the other windows are later replacements.
Former mill building, Aldham Farm; 53.53389°N 1.41833°W	—	18th century	The former water mill is in stone, on a plinth to the right, with quoins and a stone slate roof. There are two storeys and a basement, and three bays. It contains doorways and windows, and on the right is an entrance to the wheel chamber, with a wooden hatch and remains of iron winding gear.
Cartshed to north of Manor House; 53.54677°N 1.41971°W	—	Late 18th century	The cartshed, which has been altered, is in stone with a roof of Welsh slate and tile. There are nine bays, an open front with six square stone piers, and two altered bays to the right. In the left gable wall are two doorways with Tudor arched heads, and another doorway in the gable apex.
Park House; 53.54530°N 1.44935°W	—	c. 1780	A large stone house with quoins, floor bands, moulded gutter brackets, and a hipped Welsh slate roof. There are three storeys, a symmetrical front of five bays, and two two-storey rear extensions. In the centre is a Doric portico flanked by canted bay windows, all under an entablature. In the upper floor are casement windows, the window above the portico with a moulded architrave, a pulvinated frieze, and a triangular pediment. At the rear is a Venetian stair window.
Church of England Chapel, Ardsley Cemetery; 53.53946°N 1.44399°W	—	1870	The chapel is in stone with a tile roof, and consists of a three-bay nave, a small single-bay chancel, and a gabled porch with a pointed-arched entrance.
Nonconformist Chapel, Ardsley Cemetery; 53.53940°N 1.44365°W	—	1870	The chapel is in stone with a tile roof, and consists of a three-bay nave, a small single-bay chancel, and a gabled porch with a pointed-arched entrance. On the roof is a square slender wooden lantern with cusped sides and a tall tiled sprocketed spire.
Barnsley Main Colliery engine house and pithead structures 53.55287°N 1.45103°W		c. 1900	The colliery buildings, which were reconstructed in 1956, are in red brick with concrete dressings and a corrugated steel roof. The engine house has fronts of four and three bays. It contains a wide entrance in the right gable end, and a doorway on the north side, where there is also a small date plaque. On the roof are two steel ventilators. The engine house is joined to the shaft-head building by a bridge at the upper floor level. On the shaft-head building are two pit winding engine wheels, and a smaller emergency wheel, all in steel. Both parts contain windows in metal frames, mostly square, and some blocked.
Oaks Colliery Disaster Memorial; 53.54686°N 1.45532°W		1913	The memorial commemorates the Oaks Colliery Disaster of 1866. It has a stone pedestal consisting of two abutting squares with moulded entablatures and deep plinths. On the rear square is an obelisk with a moulded base and a bronze finial. On the front square is a bronze statue, a copy of a statue, Gloria Victis, by Antonin Mercié, depicting Athena, a female figure carrying a wounded soldier, with an owl at her feet. The front of the pedestal carries an inscription and an inscribed bronze panel. The pedestal stands on a two-step podium and is enclosed by a low stone wall with railings.
