= Llysfaen railway station =

Former railway station in Conwy, Wales

Llysfaen

General information
- Location: Llysfaen, Conwy County Borough (then Denbighshire); Wales
- Coordinates: 53.2912°N 3.6676°W
- Grid reference: SH888785
- Platforms: 2

Other information
- Status: Disused

History
- Original company: London and North Western Railway
- Pre-grouping: London and North Western Railway
- Post-grouping: London, Midland and Scottish Railway

Key dates
- 1 August 1862: Opened as Llandulas
- 1 July 1889: Renamed Llysfaen
- 5 January 1931: Station closed
Location

Llysfaen railway station was located in Llysfaen, Conwy County Borough (then Denbighshire), North Wales, situated between the Old Colwyn to the west and the sea to the north.

== History ==
Opened 1 August 1862 by the London and North Western Railway, it was served by what is now the North Wales Coast Line between Chester, Cheshire and Holyhead, Anglesey. Initially known as Llandulas station, it was changed to Llysfaen in 1889 when a new station, was built nearer Llanddulas.

A basic signal box was built near the station. This helped to control traffic in and out of the sidings used by Imperial Chemical Industries to serve its nearby quarry. It was improved to a brick building in 1870 and further improved in 1902.

In 1868 the LNWR was criticised by the Board of Trade during their report following the Abergele rail disaster. Two uncontrolled goods wagons left the sidings at Llysfaen and were struck by the Prince of Wales locomotive which was hauling several carriages near Abergele. The report read: "Llysfaen sidings had never been inspected by a Government official or been approved by the Board of Trade. They were quite unfit to be used at the same time to support the quarry operations and to accommodate slow trains allowing expresses to pass them."

There were two platforms at the station connected by a ground level barrow crossing over the tracks. The main station building was located on the up line (eastbound) whilst the down line platform had a small shelter. The station was closed on 5 January 1931 and the signal box was taken out of action in 1983 following the closure of the sidings. Only a few remains of the platforms can be seen.

Preceding station	Historical railways	Following station
Llandulas; Line open, station closed	London and North Western Railway; North Wales Coast Line	Old Colwyn; Line open, station closed
