= Stairfoot railway station =

Disused railway station in South Yorkshire, England

Stairfoot
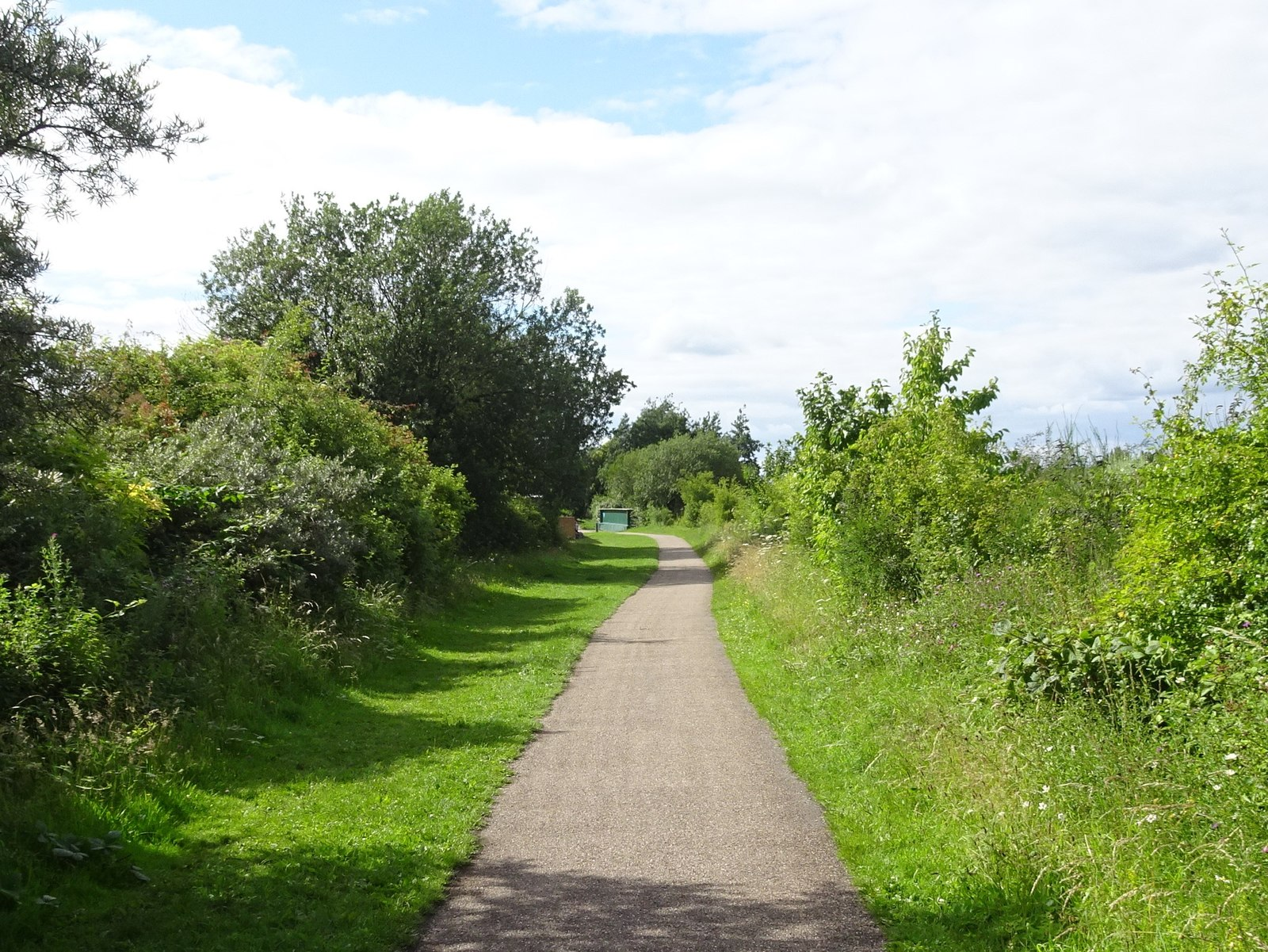
- Site of 1871 station in July 2020.

General information
- Location: Stairfoot, Barnsley; England
- Coordinates: 53.5451°N 1.4373°W
- Grid reference: SE373055
- Platforms: 2

Other information
- Status: Disused

History
- Original company: South Yorkshire Railway

Key dates
- 1851: opened
- 1 December 1871: resited
- 1957: closed
Location

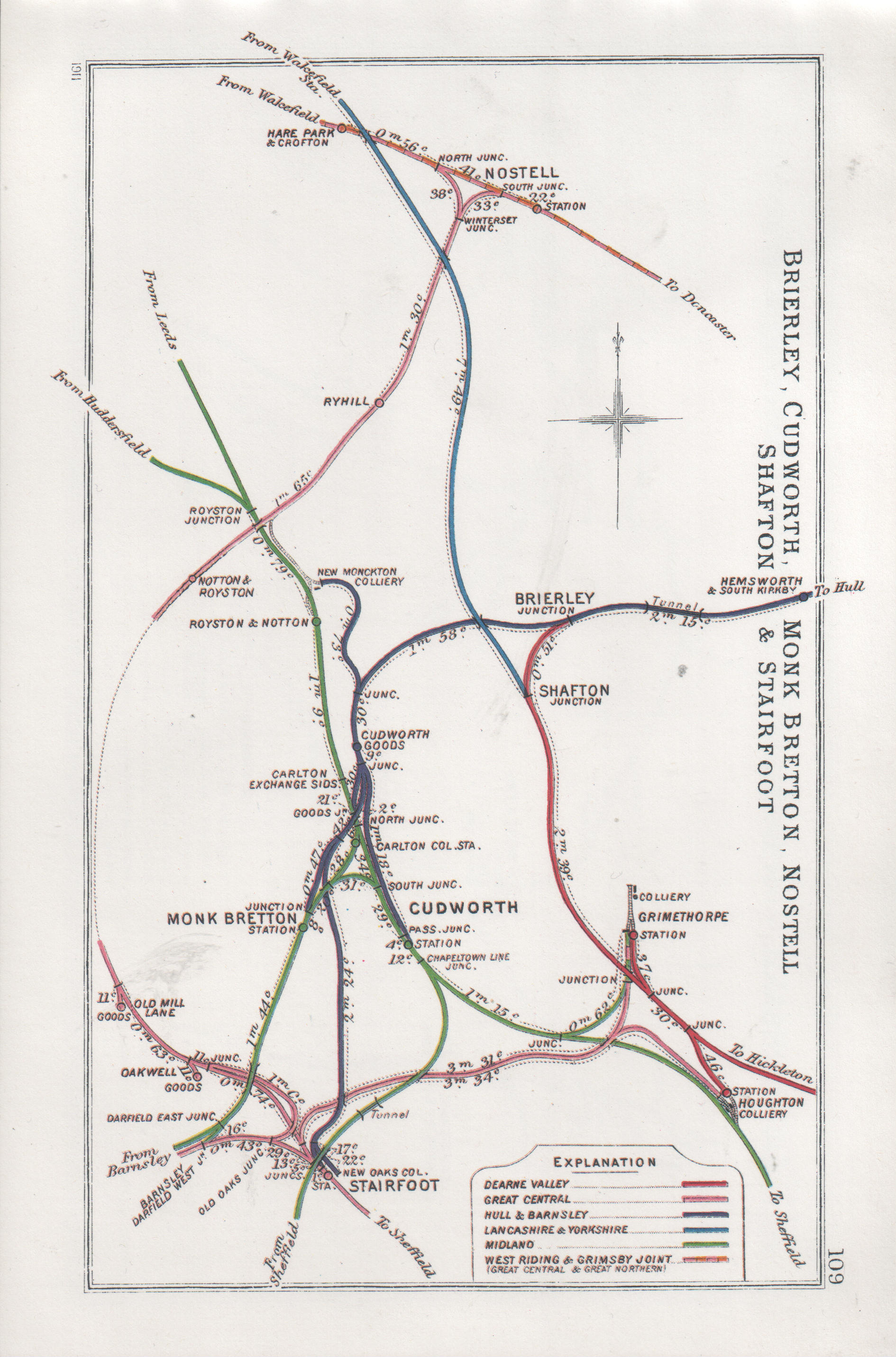
Railway Clearing House diagram of 1911 including the junctions at Stairfoot

Stairfoot railway station was a railway station on the South Yorkshire Railway's main line between Mexborough and Barnsley. It was situated between Wombwell Central and Barnsley. The station was intended to serve the communities of Ardsley and Stairfoot, South Yorkshire, England.

The original station, which was called Ardsley, was situated close by the point where the Doncaster - Barnsley main road (A635) joins with the Rotherham - Barnsley road (A633) and was opened on 1 July 1851. It suffered a temporary closure between 1856 and April 1858 and was closed on 1 December 1871, being replaced by a new station on an adjacent site built in the "Double Pavilion" style favoured by the Manchester, Sheffield and Lincolnshire Railway.

The station was the scene of an accident on 12 December 1870, when a goods train divided, the rear section rolling backwards towards the platforms and colliding with stationary passenger train, killing 15 passengers and injuring 59 more.

In due course the area around Stairfoot became a complex set of railway junctions and fly-overs. Joining the South Yorkshire Railway's line was a junction to the Barnsley Coal Railway, built in two sections to reach the West Riding and Grimsby Railway's main line at Notton, to the south of Wakefield. There was also a connection to the Hull and Barnsley Railway at Cudworth, whilst at a higher level the road and rail junctions were crossed by the Midland Railway line between Wombwell and Cudworth.

The station, which suffered heavily from bus competition, closed on 16 September 1957.

Preceding station	Disused railways	Following station
Wombwell Central	BR Eastern Region; Doncaster-Barnsley Line	Barnsley Court House
Dovecliffe	BR Eastern Region; Sheffield Victoria-Barnsley Line	Barnsley Court House
