= Abergele and Pensarn railway station =

Railway station in Conwy County Borough, Wales

Abergele and Pensarn Welsh: Abergele a Phensarn

General information
- Location: Abergele, Conwy; Wales
- Coordinates: 53.295°N 3.583°W
- Grid reference: SH946787
- Manager: Transport for Wales
- Platforms: 2

Other information
- Station code: AGL
- Classification: DfT category F1

History
- Original company: Chester and Holyhead Railway
- Pre-grouping: London and North Western Railway

Key dates
- 1 May 1848: Opened as Abergele
- ?: Renamed Abergele & Pensarn

Passengers
- 2020/21: ▼18,954
- 2021/22: ▲58,556
- 2022/23: ▲81,982
- 2023/24: ▲94,890
- 2024/25: ▲0.105 million

Listed Building – Grade II
- Feature: Abergele & Pensarn station booking hall
- Designated: 5 August 1997
- Reference no.: 18703
Location
Notes
- Passenger statistics from the Office of Rail and Road

Abergele and Pensarn railway station is a station on the North Wales Coast Line, which serves both the town of Abergele and suburb of Pensarn in Conwy County Borough, Wales. It is between Colwyn Bay and Rhyl, and is 213 miles 30 chains (343.4 km) from London Euston, measured via Crewe.

== History ==
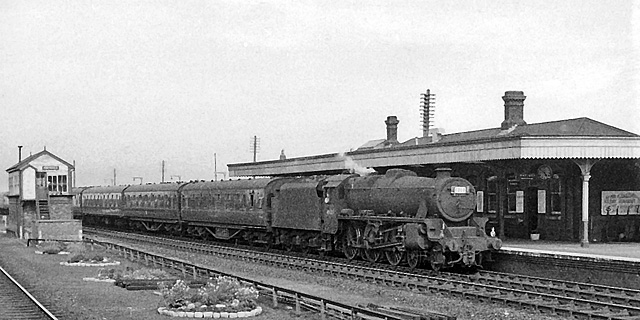
The station in 1962

Opened as Abergele by the Chester and Holyhead Railway on 1 May 1848, the 'and Pensarn' suffix was believed to have been added when the station was substantially rebuilt in 1883, although many sources before that were already using the suffix. The station had been the location of two LMS caravans in 1935 and 1936 followed by three caravans from 1937 to 1939. Nine camping coaches were positioned here by the London Midland Region from 1954 to 1971 (eight only in 1954).

=== Resignalling ===
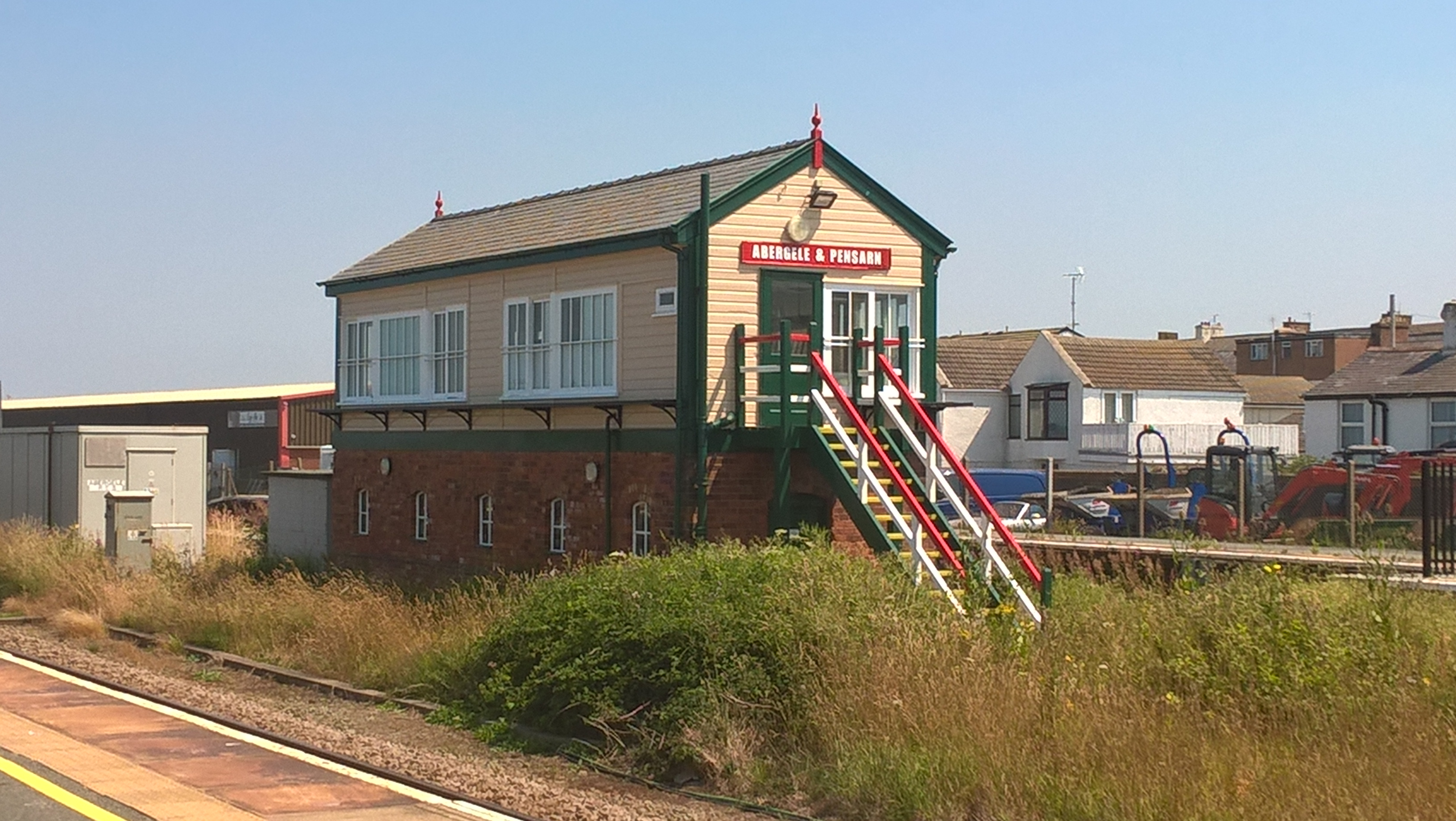
Abergele signal box closed on 24 March 2018 along with seven others during Phase 1 of North Wales Coast Resignalling.

The station was originally served by loops off the main line in both directions. Although the eastbound loop was removed some decades ago, the westbound one remained in use until early 2017 - it was decommissioned over the weekend of 8/9 January. A replacement bus service was provided to Rhyl whilst the work was in progress, as westbound trains were not to call until the work was completed. The platform was closed for the works from April 2017 and reopened to traffic on 12 March 2018. As part of the same modernisation scheme, the signal box here closed in March 2018, when new colour light signalling was commissioned between Colwyn Bay and Shotton.

=== Abergele train disaster ===
On 20 August 1868, the Irish Mail express collided with some runaway goods wagons containing paraffin oil which had been left on the running line between Abergele & Pensarn and Llandulas stations to allow a shunting manoeuvre. As the oil ignited on impact, the front coaches of the express caught fire. There were 33 fatalities.

== Facilities ==
The station is unstaffed and intending passengers must purchase tickets from the ticket vending machine on platform 2 prior to travel. Train running information is offered via CIS screens, customer help points and timetable poster boards, along with a payphone on platform 2. Step-free access is available to both platforms via ramps from the road bridge linking them. In 2018, new cycle racks and waiting shelters were installed.

The former booking office was refurbished for community use in 2021, funded by the Railway Heritage Trust. It is Grade II listed.

== Passenger volume ==
Passenger volume at Abergele and Pensarn
	2004–05	2005–06	2006–07	2007–08	2008–09	2009–10	2010–11	2011–12	2012–13	2013–14	2014–15	2015–16	2016–17	2017–18	2018–19	2019–20	2020–21	2021–22	2022–23	2023–24	2024–25
Entries and exits	59,504	58,243	62,799	64,015	70,296	71,110	76,650	84,488	81,476	81,152	73,642	70,932	68,632	70,112	73,640	76,000	18,954	58,556	81,982	94,890	104,922

The statistics cover twelve month periods that start in April.

== Services ==
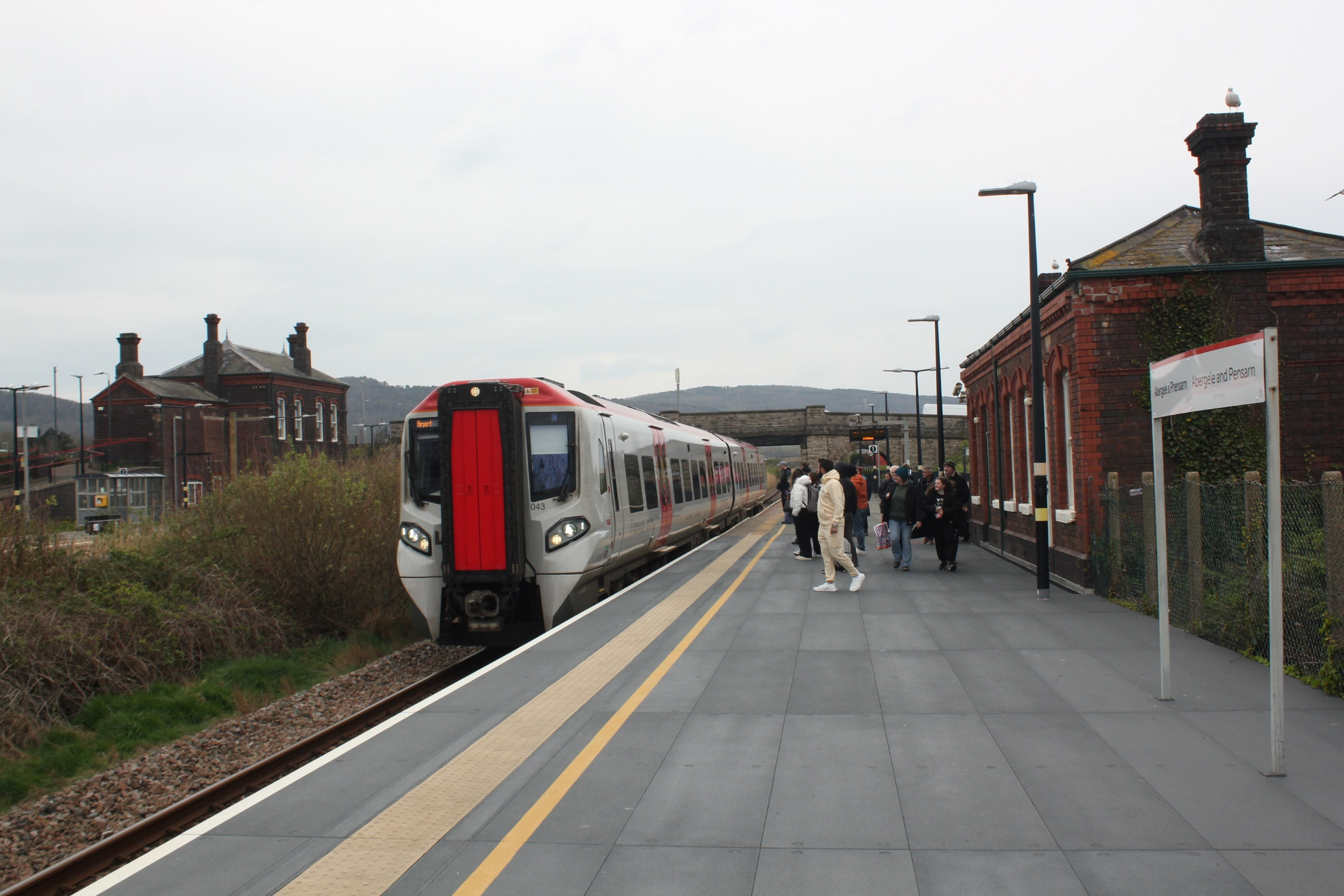
A Class 197 calls with a Llandudno to Manchester service

The station is served by an hourly service on weekdays and Saturdays in each direction operated by Transport for Wales, which runs between Manchester Airport (via Chester and Warrington Bank Quay) to the east and Llandudno to the west. A few services between Crewe/Birmingham International/Cardiff Central and Holyhead also call at peak periods and in the late evening.

On Sundays, the service is provided by Holyhead to Crewe trains, which call hourly each way from late afternoon (with a less frequent service until the early afternoon).

Preceding station	National Rail	Following station
Rhyl	Transport for Wales; North Wales Coast Line	Colwyn Bay

== Bibliography ==
- Butt, R. V. J. (October 1995). The Directory of Railway Stations: details every public and private passenger station, halt, platform and stopping place, past and present (1st ed.). Sparkford: Patrick Stephens Ltd. ISBN 978-1-85260-508-7. OCLC 60251199. OL 11956311M.
- McRae, Andrew (1997). British Railway Camping Coach Holidays: The 1930s & British Railways (London Midland Region). Vol. Scenes from the Past: 30 (Part One). Foxline. ISBN 1-870119-48-7.
- Quick, Michael (2023) [2001]. Railway passenger stations in Great Britain: a chronology (PDF). version 5.05. Railway & Canal Historical Society.
