= Rhyl railway station =

Railway station in Denbighshire, Wales

Rhyl Welsh: Y Rhyl
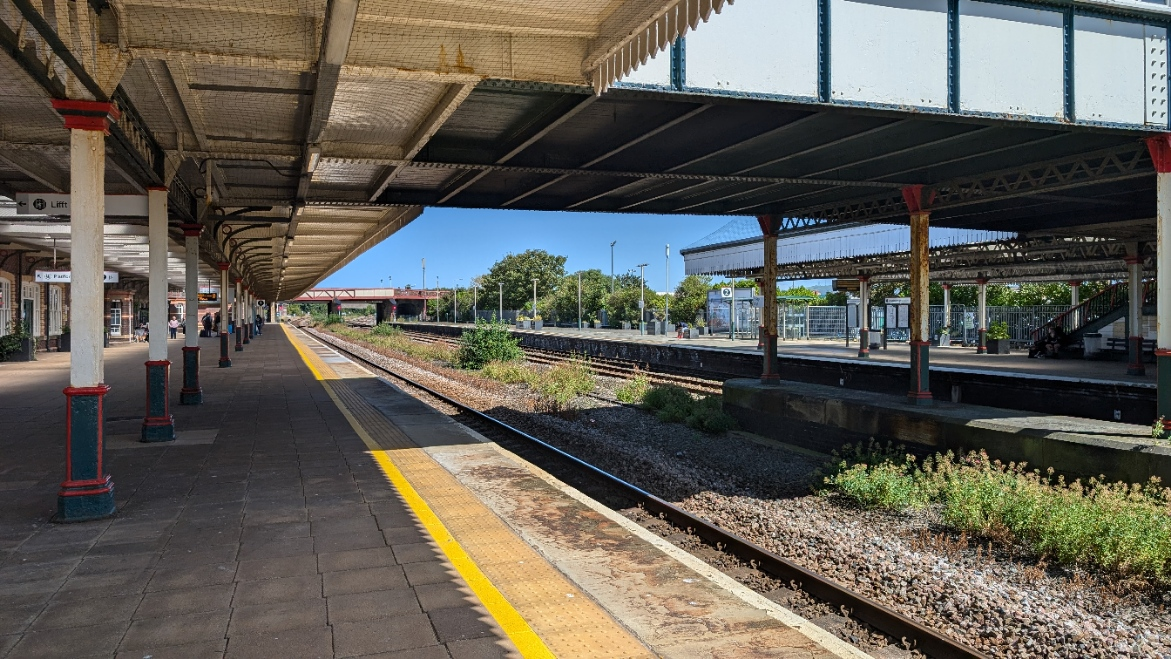
- Rhyl station pictured in August 2024

General information
- Location: Rhyl, Denbighshire; Wales
- Coordinates: 53.318°N 3.489°W
- Grid reference: SJ009811
- Managed by: Transport for Wales
- Platforms: 2

Other information
- Station code: RHL
- Classification: DfT category D

History
- Opened: 1848

Passengers
- 2020/21: ▼0.152 million
- 2021/22: ▲0.411 million
- 2022/23: ▲0.483 million
- 2023/24: ▲0.567 million
- 2024/25: ▲0.612 million

Listed Building – Grade II
- Feature: Rhyl Railway Station, Main Building
- Designated: 11 January 1993
- Reference no.: 1526
Location
Notes
- Passenger statistics from the Office of Rail and Road

Rhyl railway station is on the Crewe to Holyhead North Wales Coast Line and serves the holiday resort of Rhyl, Wales.

== History ==
The station was opened to traffic on 1 May 1848, being one of the original intermediate stations on the Chester and Holyhead Railway main line along the coast. Trains could run between Chester and Bangor from the day the station opened, but it would be a further two years before the completion of the Britannia Bridge across the Menai Straits allowed through running to and from Holyhead. A two-platform station was provided by the C&HR, with a main two-storey building on the eastbound (north) side. A decade later, it became a junction with the opening of a branch line to Denbigh (the Vale of Clwyd Railway) on 5 October 1858. The C&HR was taken over by the London and North Western Railway a few months later, with the Vale of Clwyd also being leased (and later absorbed) by the LNWR in 1867 to prevent the rival Great Western Railway acquiring it and thus gaining access to the area.

Under LNWR auspices the coast line became one of the company's major trunk routes, serving several popular holiday resorts in addition to the port of Holyhead. The rapid increase in traffic led the company to quadruple most of the section between Chester and Llandudno Junction in the 1890s to provide extra capacity. This included the Prestatyn to Abergele stretch in 1897 and the station at Rhyl was remodelled and enlarged as a result. The westbound platform was re-located and widened into an island with an extra loop line on the south side, new bay platforms added (along with new carriage sidings and a large goods yard) and a pair of non-platform lines laid in the centre of the station for use by non-stop trains. A covered footbridge was provided to link the platforms, along with extensive awnings to shelter passengers and two large brick and timber signal boxes built to control the new layout. These were all completed and the new layout commissioned in 1900.

Rhyl would remain a popular holiday destination throughout the 20th century, though after World War II and nationalisation of the railway system in 1948 the Denbigh branch would see its service reduced; the line eventually closing to passenger traffic in September 1955. Excursions and goods traffic would continue until the line's eventual closure to all traffic in March 1965. The 1960s and 70s would also see the main line gradually lose much of the additional infrastructure added by the LNWR as road competition and changing holiday habits led to a decline in summer passenger numbers (along with the Beeching closures of many of the line's intermediate stations). By 1976 both slow lines towards Abergele had been lifted, along with west-end bays at the station and the up slow eastwards to Prestatyn, whilst the down loop platform saw use only on summer weekends. The remaining down slow from Prestatyn, goods sidings and platform 3 line at the station survived until 1990, when they were also lifted (along with the up fast line through the station) and Rhyl No2 signal box closed. Though the latter still survives (though boarded up, it is a listed building), the site of the old platform 3 and goods yard has been redeveloped (now a supermarket and associated car park).

Only the two through platforms remain in use in 2016, along with the down through line and a pair of engineers sidings. These were formerly supervised from the former No.1 signal box, but this was made redundant in March 2018, when a new modular colour light signalling system controlled from the South Wales Rail Operating Centre was brought into use between Shotton and Colwyn Bay as part of a £50 million route upgrade project.

== Facilities ==
Ticket barriers are in operation at the station; the ticket office on platform 1 is staffed throughout the week. A ticket machine is also available for use and for collecting pre-paid tickets purchased online or via telephone. There are also toilets, a cafe, retail units and waiting room in the main building. Platform 2 (westbound) has a waiting shelter and canopies, but the remaining buildings there are not in rail use. The platforms are linked by a footbridge with integrated lift, so both are fully accessible for disabled passengers. Train running information is offered via digital display screens, automated announcements and timetable poster boards.

== Services ==
Monday to Saturday:

- Transport for Wales operates an alternate hourly service from Holyhead to Birmingham International and to Cardiff Central, both via Chester, Wrexham General and Shrewsbury.
- Transport for Wales operates an hourly stopping service between Llandudno and Manchester Piccadilly or Manchester Airport via Warrington Bank Quay.
- Avanti West Coast operates four trains per day each way from London Euston to Holyhead, as well as an additional northbound only service from London Euston to Bangor. There are two services each way per weekday from Crewe to Holyhead, with two extra northbound services, of which one terminates at Bangor. One northbound service originates from Birmingham New Street. There are three southbound services per day to London Euston on Saturdays, as well as one southbound service per day each way to Crewe, with two northbound trains to Holyhead from London Euston and two trains to Holyhead from Crewe. There is also a northbound only service from Crewe to Llandudno Junction.

On Sundays, there is an hourly service each way - westbound to Holyhead and eastbound to Crewe. There are also three trains each way to London Euston, operated by Avanti West Coast, who also operate one northbound train from Crewe to Holyhead. There are a limited number of services to Manchester, Birmingham and Cardiff.

Preceding station	National Rail	Following station
Prestatyn	Transport for Wales; North Wales Coast Line	Abergele & Pensarn
Flint	Transport for Wales; Premier Service	Colwyn Bay
Prestatyn	Avanti West Coast; Holyhead/Bangor–London Euston	Colwyn Bay
	Disused railways	
Terminus	London and North Western Railway; Vale of Clwyd Railway	Rhuddlan

== Gallery ==
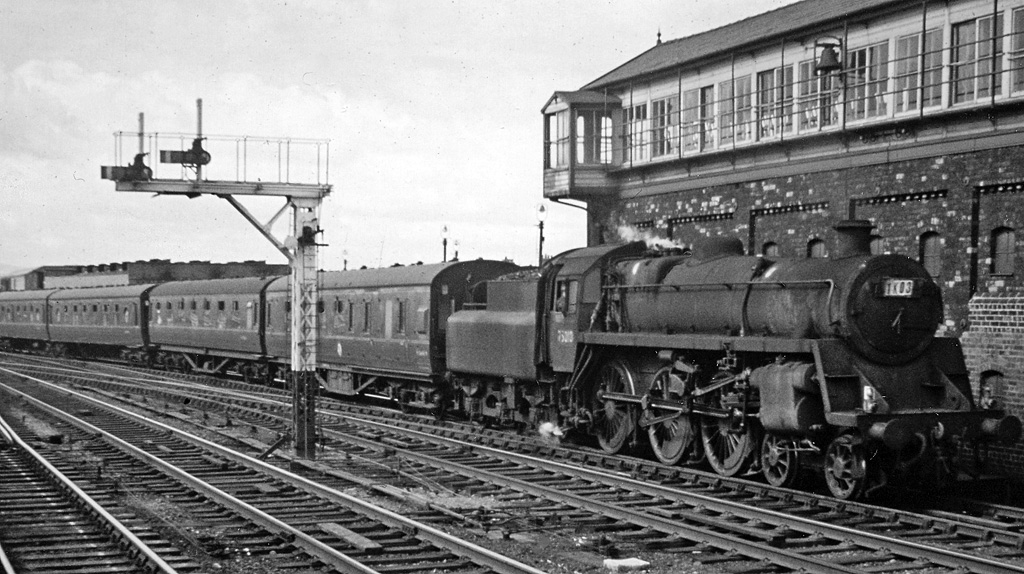
Up express entering Rhyl in 1964

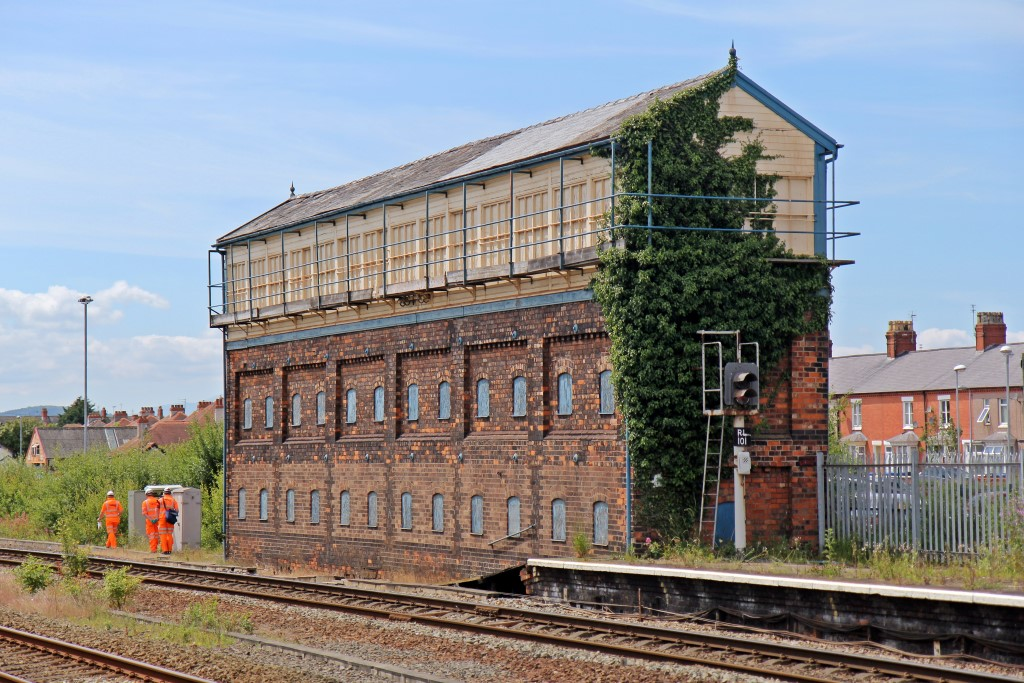
Rhyl No.2 signal box

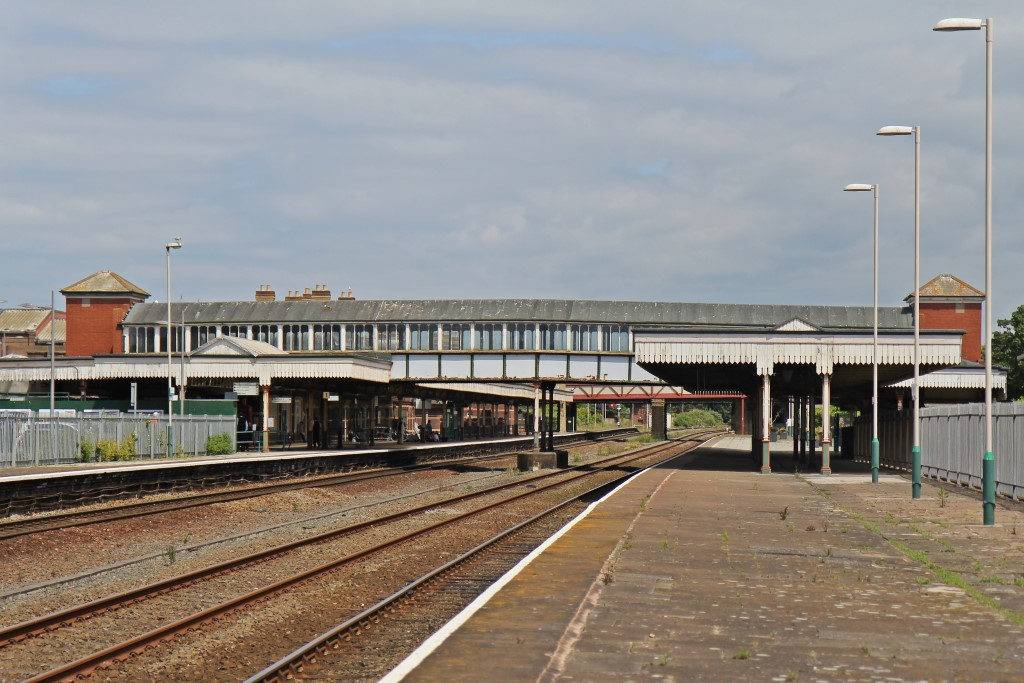
The station footbridge

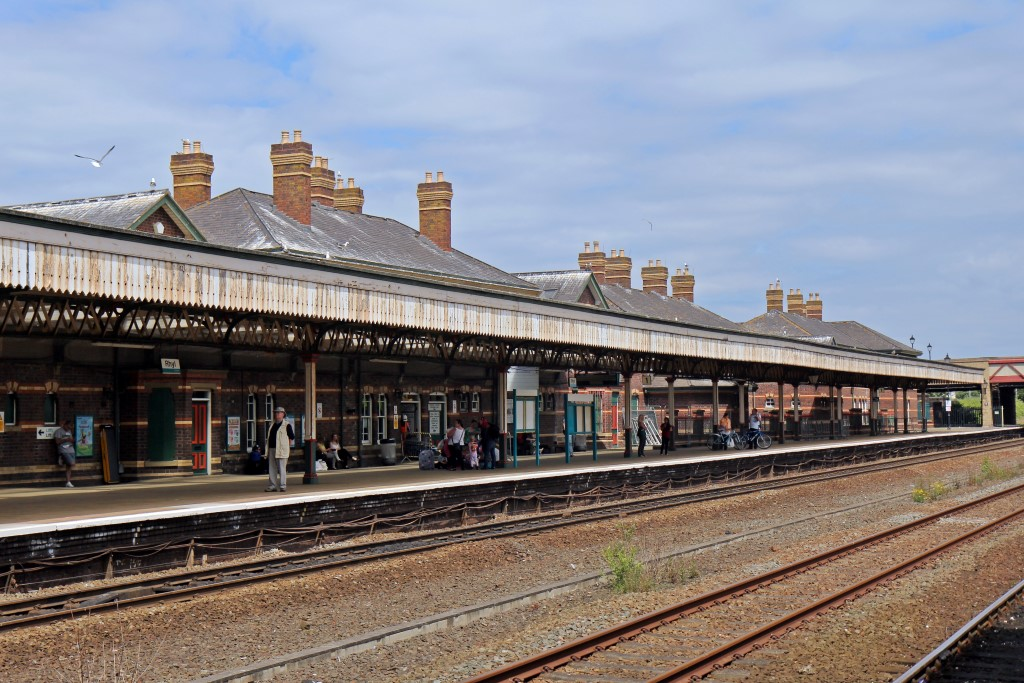
Platform 1
