= Stairfoot =

Ward in Barnsley, South Yorkshire, England

Coordinates: 53.54°N 1.44°W

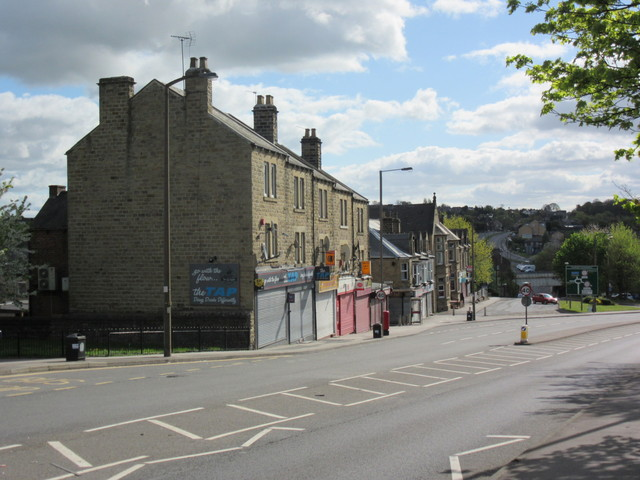
- A row of shops on Doncaster Road

- Location within South Yorkshire
- Population: 11,510 (ward.2011)
- Metropolitan borough: Barnsley
- Metropolitan county: South Yorkshire
- Region: Yorkshire and the Humber
- Country: England
- Sovereign state: United Kingdom
- Post town: BARNSLEY
- Postcode district: S70
- Dialling code: 01226
- Police: South Yorkshire
- Fire: South Yorkshire
- Ambulance: Yorkshire
- UK Parliament: Barnsley South

Stairfoot is a ward in Barnsley, South Yorkshire, England. It is perhaps so named because it lies at the bottom of a valley in between the undulations of two small hills on the old road from Barnsley to Doncaster. Stairfoot is surrounded by the villages of Kendray and Ardsley.

Stairfoot is known widely throughout South Yorkshire for its roundabout. Controlled by traffic signals, it is notorious for its delays to the local traffic system and has inspired a local song. The ward used to have its own railway station, but this closed in 1957 due to competition from local buses.

The area supports over 300 businesses, including retail outlets such as McDonald's, Dunelm Mill and Tesco, along with various restaurants and convenience stores.

The Trans Pennine Trail also passes through Stairfoot using the old railway bridges which cross the roads leading to the roundabout, and the old railway bedding which has been mainly tarmacked. It is suitable for cyclists, pushchairs and wheelchair users, and some parts are open to horse riding.

== Hope Glass Works ==
In 1867, Ben Rylands founded the Hope Glass Works at Stairfoot on what is now derelict land alongside the Aldi supermarket. During 1873, Rylands was heavily involved in perfecting the manufacture process for Hiram Codd's new globe-stoppered mineral water bottle. Codd rewarded him with a licence to manufacture the bottle in April 1874 and the business took off. Orders for the new bottle were so good that Rylands could not meet demand from his original works, so work was commenced on a second factory on land that was occupied by Beatson Clark. Hiram Codd joined Ben Rylands in partnership at Stairfoot in May 1877.

In 1881, after four years together, Ben died leaving Codd to carry on the business alone. In 1882, Codd admitted Ben's son, Dan Rylands as a business partner. Dan Rylands took over the partnership after his father's death but this new alliance was doomed to failure, even though they patented 'the crystal' (valve codd) in 1882. On October 6, 1884, probably resenting the young Rylands inventive intrusion, Hiram Codd allowed his partner to buy him out of the business and left to pursue other interests. The Hope Glass Works under the stewardship of Dan Rylands was now the largest factory of its kind in the world.

== See also ==
- Listed buildings in Stairfoot
