= Colwyn Bay railway station =

Railway station in Conwy, Wales

Colwyn Bay Welsh: Bae Colwyn
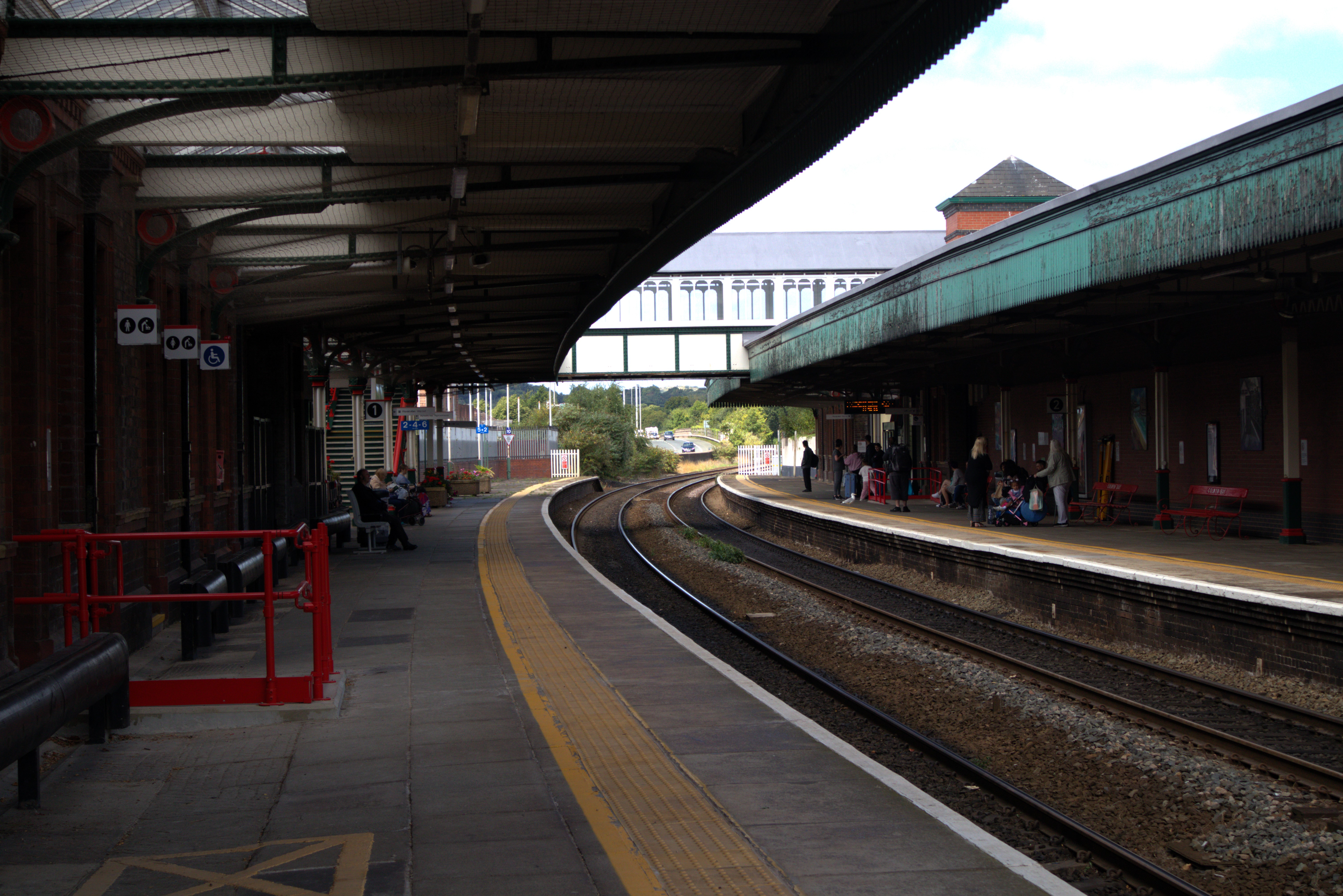
- Colwyn Bay Station in August 2024

General information
- Location: Colwyn Bay, Conwy County Borough; Wales
- Coordinates: 53.296°N 3.725°W
- Grid reference: SH851791
- Manager: Transport for Wales Rail
- Platforms: 2

Other information
- Station code: CWB
- Classification: DfT category D

History
- Opened: October 1849

Passengers
- 2020/21: ▼64,770
- Interchange: ▼113
- 2021/22: ▲0.207 million
- Interchange: ▲523
- 2022/23: ▲0.259 million
- Interchange: ▼241
- 2023/24: ▲0.320 million
- Interchange: ▲461
- 2024/25: ▲0.358 million
- Interchange: ▼181
Location
Notes
- Passenger statistics from the Office of Rail and Road

Colwyn Bay railway station (Welsh: Bae Colwyn) is on the Crewe to Holyhead North Wales Coast Line serving the seaside town of Colwyn Bay in the Conwy County Borough of North Wales.

== History ==
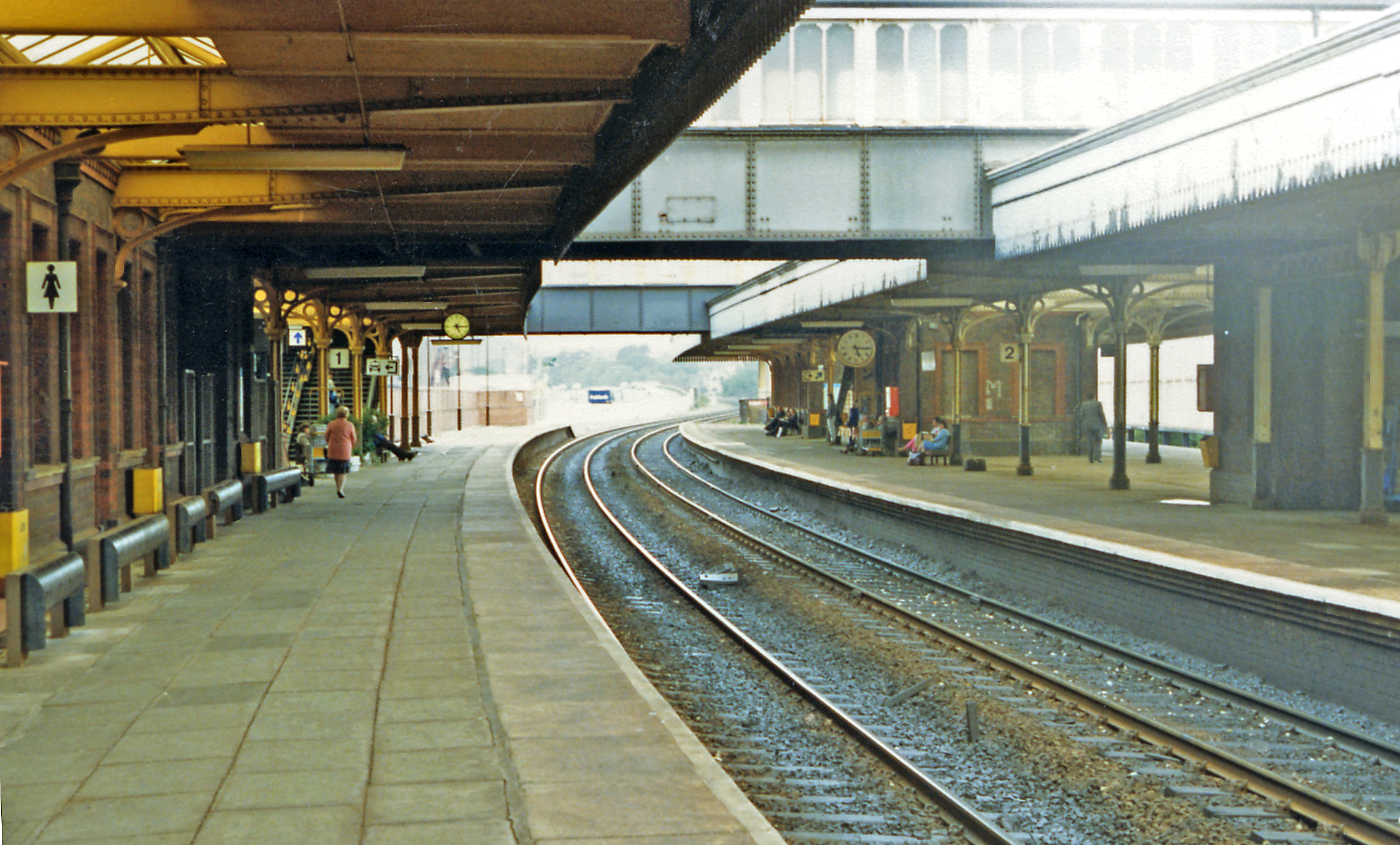
The station platforms in June 1986

Colwyn Bay station was opened by the Chester and Holyhead Railway in October 1849; originally named Colwyn, it was renamed Colwyn Bay in 1876. The station is in an unusual location straddling a curved section of track. As a result, the track bed is cambered so that trains come to rest at the station platform at a significant tilt.

The current station consists of the platform faces that served the former fast lines (the section from here to Llandudno Junction was quadruple track until the 1960s). The platform faces to the slow lines were taken out of service and that on the "down" (westbound) side has been obliterated as a result of the construction of the A55 dual carriageway (along with the old station goods yard). The main station building stands on what was the down island platform.

== Facilities ==
Ticket barriers are in operation at this station. The station has a footbridge and sheltered seating, toilets, waiting rooms on both platforms, along with digital information screens and automatic train announcements on both platforms. Lifts provide full step-free access to each side. The ticket office is staffed all week, from 06:15 until 19:30 on weekdays and from 09:10 to 16:40 on Sundays.

== Services ==
Mondays to Saturdays:

- Transport for Wales Rail operates an alternate hourly service between Holyhead and Birmingham International or Cardiff Central via Wrexham General. A few early morning/late evening trains start/finish at Crewe rather than Birmingham or Cardiff.
- Transport for Wales Rail also operates an hourly stopping service between Llandudno and Manchester Piccadilly via Warrington Bank Quay. All of these services call at Abergele & Pensarn and Shotton, with some extended through to/from Manchester Airport.
- Avanti West Coast operates four trains per day each way from London Euston to Holyhead, as well as an additional northbound only service from London Euston to Bangor. There are two services each way per weekday from Crewe to Holyhead, with two extra northbound services, of which one terminates at Bangor. One northbound service originates from Birmingham New Street. There are three southbound services per day to London Euston on Saturdays, as well as one southbound service per day each way to Crewe, with two northbound trains to Holyhead from London Euston and two trains to Holyhead from Crewe. There is also a northbound only service from Crewe to Llandudno Junction.

On Sundays there is a basic hourly service each way, westbound to Holyhead and eastbound to Crewe. There are three services each way to London Euston, as well as a northbound only service from Crewe to Holyhead. A limited number of trains to Birmingham, Cardiff and Manchester also operate.

Preceding station	National Rail	Following station
Abergele and Pensarn	Transport for Wales Rail; North Wales Coast Line	Llandudno Junction
Rhyl	Transport for Wales Rail; Premier Service	Llandudno Junction
Rhyl	Avanti West Coast; Holyhead/Bangor–London Euston	Llandudno Junction
