= Llysfaen =

Village in Conwy County Borough, Wales

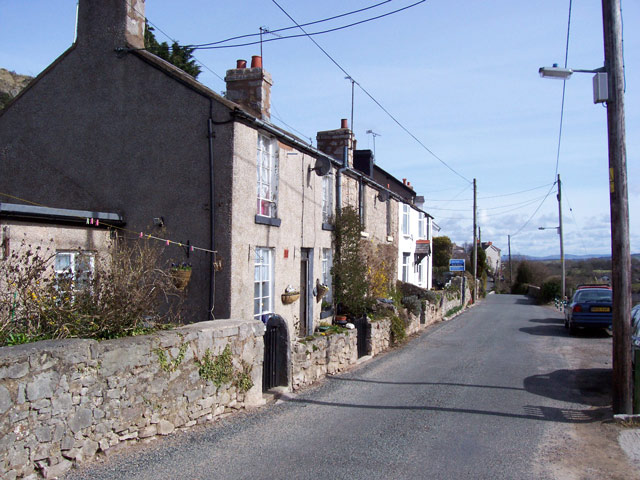
- Llysfaen

- Location within Conwy
- Population: 2,743 (2011)
- OS grid reference: SH887771
- Community: Llysfaen
- Principal area: Conwy
- Preserved county: Clwyd
- Country: Wales
- Sovereign state: United Kingdom
- Post town: COLWYN BAY
- Postcode district: LL29
- Dialling code: 01492
- Police: North Wales
- Fire: North Wales
- Ambulance: Welsh
- UK Parliament: Clwyd North
- Senedd Cymru – Welsh Parliament: Clwyd West
- List of places UK Wales Conwy 53.279°N 3.668°W Map of the community

Llysfaen is a village and community in Conwy County Borough overlooking the north coast of Wales, and situated on the hill Mynydd Marian. For local government purposes, it is also a ward. The community includes the Peulwys estate of Old Colwyn.

== Introduction ==
Llysfaen is located one kilometre (0.6 miles) inland, halfway between the coastal towns of Abergele and Colwyn Bay. Neighbouring villages include Old Colwyn, Llanddulas, Dolwen and Betws-yn-Rhos. To its immediate west is Mynydd Marian, a mountain known for its limestone grassland and the rare dwarf subspecies of the silver-studded blue butterfly, and Craig y Forwyn is to the east. Llysfaen also overlooks the Irish sea, as well as Kinmel Bay, Rhyl, and the Clwydian Range.

The council ward, including the village centre and surrounding precincts, occupies 5.11 square kilometres (1,260 acres, 511 hectares). The community's population has remained relatively static in recent times and was 2,652 at the census held in 2001.

The community is currently part of Conwy County Borough. However, it historically formed an exclave of Caernarfonshire assumed by the surrounding Denbighshire in 1923; subsequent local government reorganisation saw it administered as part of Clwyd (1974–1996).

The name, Llysfaen is Welsh for stone court (i.e. a court built of stone).

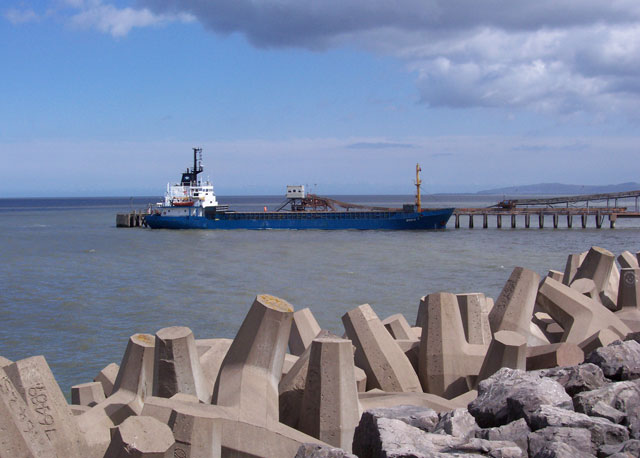
A ship at Raynes Jetty in 2008

Throughout much of Llysfaen's recent history, many of its villagers worked at the nearby Llysfaen and Llanddulas Limestone Quarry from where lime was shipped to Liverpool or Fleetwood using Raynes Jetty in Llanddulas Bay.

== Facilities ==
The village has a small number of facilities including a primary school, Ysgol Cynfran, accepting pupils from nursery age to 11; a convenience store; the mediaeval St. Cynfran's parish church (see below); the village hall; a playgroup; three parks, a small hairdressers and barbers, two telephone boxes, and two post boxes. A mobile library run by Conwy Library Service also calls at the village every three weeks.

Llysfaen currently has a number of youth football teams catering for ages from 7 to 18 and a men's team too. A majority of the teams' games are played on the village's Banana Pitch, so called because it dips heavily in the middle.

Llysfaen has a bowling green which is home to a lawn bowls team and a multi-use games area where netball, tennis and hockey is played.

== History ==
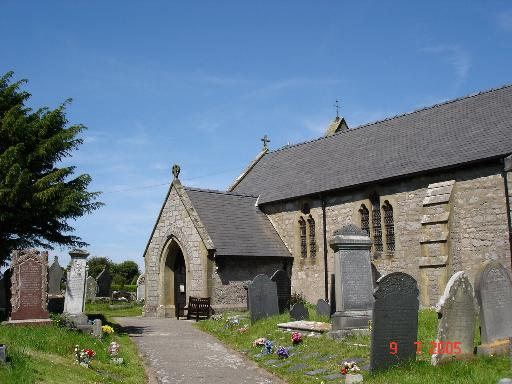
St Cynfran's church

The patron saint of Llysfaen is Saint Cynfran, who is traditionally believed to have, in 777, founded the eponymous church in the village, above whose entrance is a carving in rock of the saint. The primary school is also named after Cynfran.

In the 1254 Norwich Taxation, Llysfaen was recorded as Ecc'a de Llesvaen, and in the 1291 taxation as Rectoria di Lisnaen and taxed at £4.

St Cynfran's church has been rebuilt a number of times; the current twin-naved building is said to date from 1377 but is believed to incorporate stones from the original church. In 1870, the building was the subject of an extensive £1,950 internal restoration with only a few panels remaining from the Middle Ages, although the mediaeval stone walls remain. The rectilinear churchyard contains memorials going back as far as the 17th century. The churchyard is surrounded by a stone wall with yew trees both in and outside the walls, and there is a holy well, the Ffynnon Gynfran, about 100 metres to the north.

The ancient parish of Llysfaen was an exclave of the cwmwd (equivalent to a hundred) of Creuddyn within the county of Caernarfonshire, and comprised the townships of Isallt, Isyffordd, Pant (or Tre'r Pant), Penmaen and Rhwngyddwyffordd. According to the Royal Commission of the Welsh Church, the then parish had a population of 585 in 1831 rising to 1,489 in 1901.

The parish was originally slightly larger than today with an area of 1,772 acres (7.17 square kilometres) in the 1840s. In 1872, part of the parish was lost to Colwyn but the township of Twynnan was gained from Llanelian-yn-Rhos. Around 1910 the parish had increased to 1,879 acres (7.6 square kilometres).

In 1873, the local lime quarrying firm, Raynes & Co. Ltd, was established by James Trevelyan Raynes II to make sodium carbonate and limestone dust for use in glass manufacture.

=== 20th century ===
- 1923, the parish of Llysfaen was moved from Caernarfonshire (of which it had been an exclave) to the surrounding Denbighshire.
- 1927, United Alkali Company Ltd took over Raynes & Co. and were then purchased themselves in the same year by Imperial Chemical Industries (ICI).
- 1931, Llysfaen railway station closed, but the signal box was not removed until 1983 as it served sidings used by the ICI lime works.
- 1972, the church was subject to another restoration.
- 1974, the vast majority of the county of Denbighshire including Llysfaen was assumed by the larger Clwyd with Llysfaen also becoming part of the borough of Colwyn.
- 1996, as part of the reorganisation of Wales into unitary authorities, Llysfaen became part of the county borough of Conwy.

== Governance ==
A Llysfaen electoral ward exists, coterminous with the boundaries of Llysfaen community. One county councillor is elected to Conwy County Borough Council. At the May 2017 election the seat changed hands, being won by the Conservative Party from Labour, who had held the seat since the first election in 1995.

Llysfaen also elects community councillors to represent them on Llysfaen Community Council, from the community wards of Peulwys and Upper Llysfaen.
