= Llandulas railway station =

Former railway station in Conwy, Wales

Llandulas

General information
- Location: Llanddulas, Conwy County Borough (then Denbighshire); Wales
- Coordinates: 53.2928°N 3.6426°W
- Grid reference: SH906786
- Platforms: 2

Other information
- Status: Disused

History
- Original company: London and North Western Railway
- Pre-grouping: London and North Western Railway
- Post-grouping: London, Midland and Scottish Railway

Key dates
- 1 July 1889: Station opened
- 1 December 1952: Station closed
Location

Llandulas railway station was located in Conwy County Borough (then Denbighshire), North Wales, situated just north of the village of Llanddulas and with the Irish Sea to the north.

== History ==
Opened 1 July 1889 by the London and North Western Railway, it was served by what is now the North Wales Coast Line between Chester, Cheshire and Holyhead, Anglesey. This station was the second to be known as Llandulas, as the nearby station at Llysfaen originally bore that name prior to 1889. Furthermore, for unknown reasons the 1889, two platform, station was always called Llandulas, rather than Llanddulas the spelling of the locality.

Disaster struck when in October 1913 the station, along with the signal box, was destroyed by fire. Windows of the Irish mail train were damaged as it passed through the station

With easy access to the sandy beaches of the area the station would have been popular with tourists at its time of opening. However outside of the summer the station suffered from low patronage, meaning it was closed on 1 December 1952 and never re-opened.

Preceding station	Historical railways	Following station
Abergele and Pensarn; Line and station open	London and North Western Railway; North Wales Coast Line	Llysfaen; Line open, station closed
