= Barnsley Court House railway station =

Disused railway station in South Yorkshire, England

Barnsley Court House
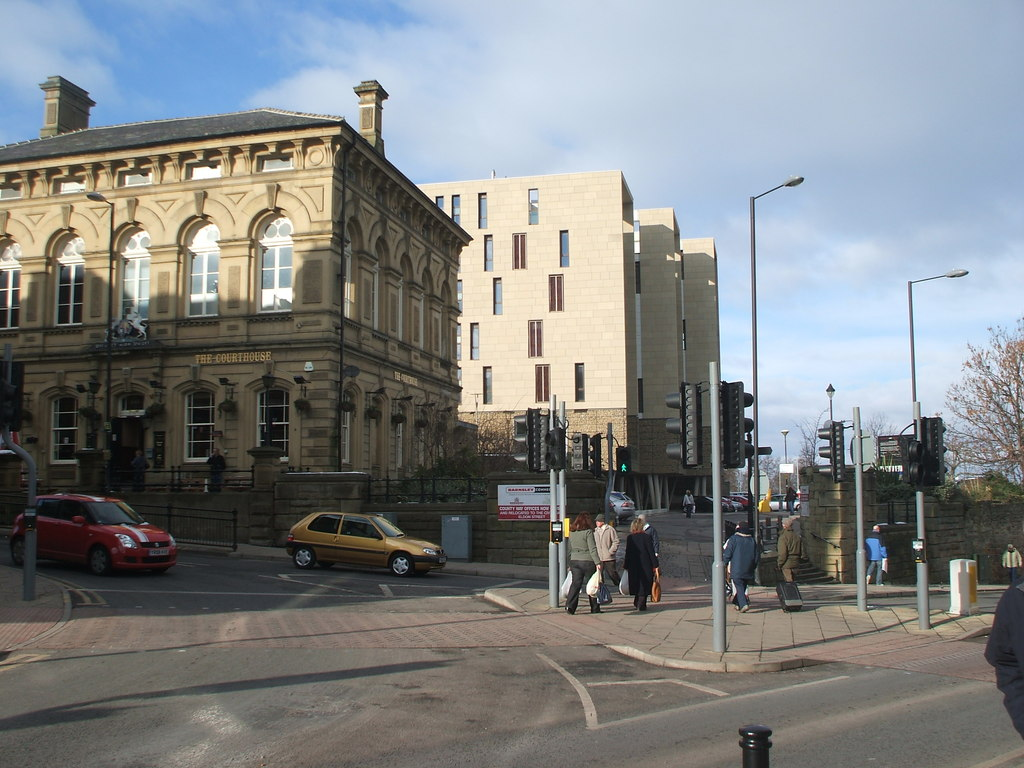
- The site of the station in 2009

General information
- Location: Barnsley, Barnsley; England
- Coordinates: 53.55539°N 1.47846°W
- Grid reference: SE346066
- Platforms: 3

Other information
- Status: Disused

History
- Original company: Midland Railway
- Pre-grouping: Midland Railway
- Post-grouping: London, Midland and Scottish Railway

Key dates
- 1 May 1870: opened
- 19 April 1960: closed
Location

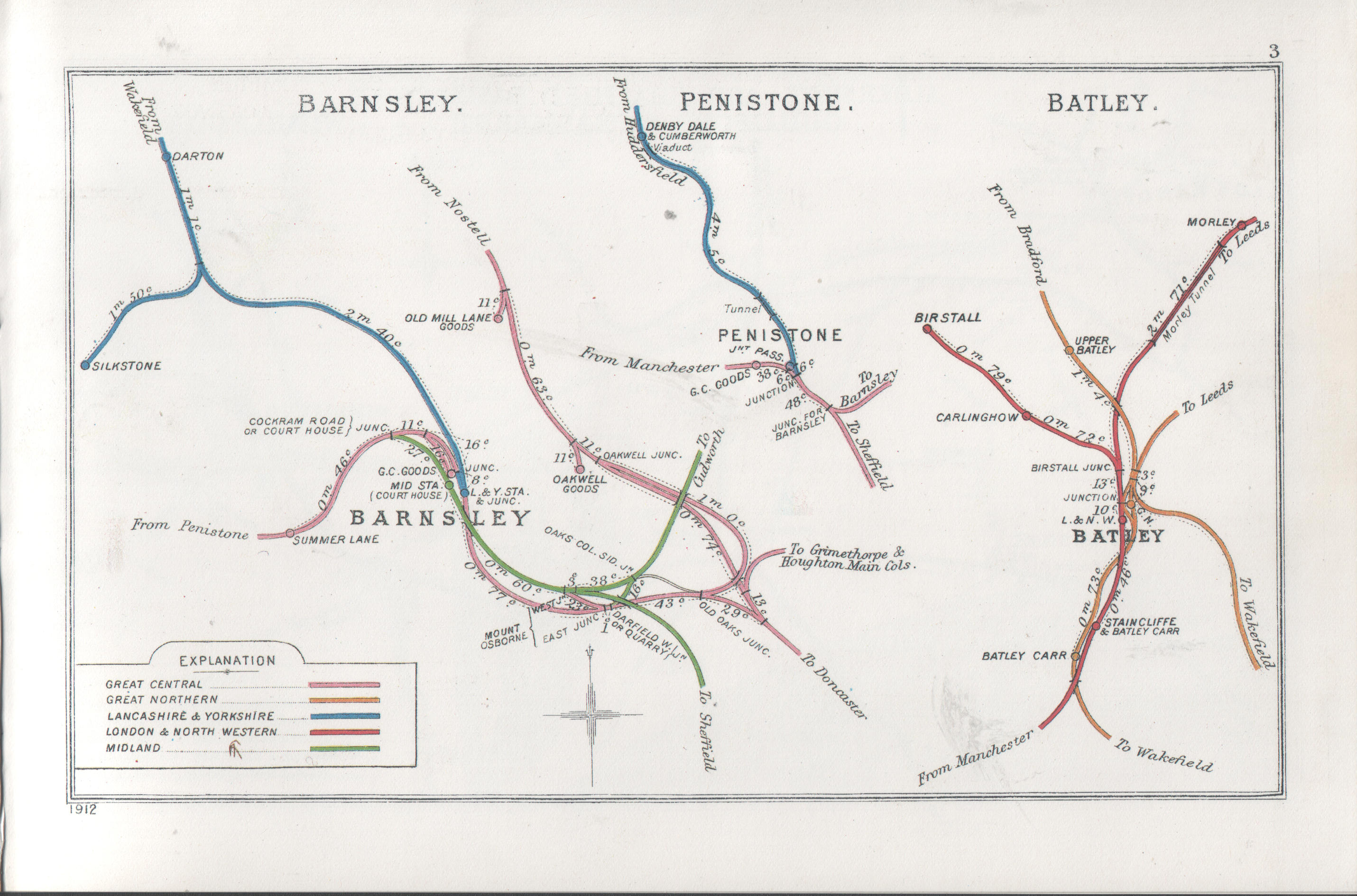
Railway Clearing House diagram of railway lines through Barnsley in 1912 (left; Court House station is in green)

Barnsley Court House railway station was a railway station in Barnsley, South Yorkshire, England. It closed in 1960.

Before this station was built the Midland Railway's Barnsley station was at Cudworth on the former North Midland Railway's line between Leeds and Derby. To reach the town, in the 1860s, the Midland opened a line from Cudworth South Junction to Barnsley and a new, albeit temporary, station Regent Street railway station, in Barnsley, South Yorkshire, was opened. The new station was made necessary due to the cramped conditions at Barnsley Exchange station. The Midland opened the line for goods traffic in April 1869 and for passengers on 1 May the following year, the delay being caused by a signalling dispute with the MS&LR over the connection at Pindar Oaks. The facilities were on an elevated site which was immediately West of Barnsley Exchange.

The Midland Railway built a new passenger station on the Regent Street site and this opened for business on 23 August 1873. On 20 January 1872 the Midland completed the purchase of the Old Court House, which fronted onto Regent Street, to incorporate the building into their new construction as a ticket office and waiting room, the new station being named "Court House" as a result. The station had an overall glass roof over its two through platforms and with its magnificent frontage was considered to be the most 'glamorous' station in the area. There was also a short 'bay' platform (No.3) at the Penistone end of the station. It was known to generations of 'Barnsleyites' as "Top Station".

The Manchester, Sheffield and Lincolnshire Railway, which had acquired the South Yorkshire Railway, built a junction to the Midland line from Cudworth at Pindar Oaks, just to the east of the town, which gave it access to that company's new station and on 1 June 1870 it moved its Doncaster to Barnsley passenger service to this station. The MS&LR, which also entered Barnsley from the Penistone direction, constructed a junction, known as Court House Junction, from that line to the new station and this enabled them to run a through service from Penistone to Doncaster. This meant that the company was the only one of the railways serving the town to operate a through service, other services operated by the Midland to Court House and the Lancashire & Yorkshire to Exchange, stopping trains from Sheffield Midland, a shuttle service from Cudworth and the service from Wakefield, terminating in the town.

The MS&LR also constructed goods facilities on the site, to the west of the passenger station, but its engine shed remained adjacent and to the east of Exchange station with access over Jumble Lane crossing. The short section of line from Court House Junction to Exchange Junction was closed to passengers on 1 June 1870 when the MS&LR changed stations and reopened, following the closure of Court House station, on 19 April 1960.

The station was controlled by two signal boxes, Court House, a small box which sat on the south end of platform 2, with 16 levers, and Barnsley Goods Yard, with a 25 lever frame (2 spare), which also controlled the bay platform (No.3), cattle dock and the goods yard.

The approach to the station from the east (Barnsley West Junction, although well to the east of Barnsley) was almost all contained on a low viaduct and the remains of the bridge that carried the Court House line over Eldon Street could be seen to the north-west of the present station until the new bus interchange project was begun (February 2006).

Services into the station were gradually reduced in the 1950s (although the G.C service from Wakefield via Nostell ended in September 1930), with the Cudworth service ending on 9 June 1958 and the Doncaster to Penistone service just over a year later in June 1959. That left only the stopping trains from Sheffield Midland, which were re-routed to Barnsley Exchange from 19 April 1960 using a new curve at Quarry Junction from the Midland route onto the old SYR line from Sheffield Victoria. The station officially closed to passenger traffic the same day, although the last train had left four days previously.

In the early 1970s the station was demolished and the Regent Street site used as a temporary home for Barnsley's famous Open-Air markets (Remember the motto:"Barnsley for Bargains") until a new market complex was completed. The Regent Street site is now a car park. The Old Court House still stands, in use as a pub/restaurant.

Preceding station	Disused railways	Following station
Stairfoot	BR Eastern Region; Doncaster-Barnsley Line	Terminus
Stairfoot	BR Eastern Region; Sheffield Victoria-Barnsley Line	Terminus
Monk Bretton to 1937 / Cudworth after 1937	BR London Midland Region; Cudworth-Barnsley Line	Terminus
Wombwell West	BR London Midland (later Eastern) Region; Sheffield Midland-Barnsley Court House Line	Terminus
