= Lady Hope =

Lady Hope may refer to:

== People ==
- Elizabeth, Lady Hope (Elizabeth Reid Cotton, 1842–1922), British evangelist active in the Temperance movement, subject of the "Lady Hope story" involving Charles Darwin
- Lady Henrietta Hope (1750–1786), British benefactor after whom Hope Chapel in Bristol is named
- May Yohé (1866–1938), American musical theatre actress, wife of Lord Francis Hope
- Lady Hope (died 1808), wife of Rear-Admiral Sir George Johnstone Hope
- Lady Hope (died 1875), wife of General The Hon. Charles Hope
- a wife of Lord Hope
- a wife of a Hope baronet

== Other uses ==
- Lady Hope, a horse, 1911 winner of the Stradbroke Handicap
- Lady Hope, a shipwreck in August 1829
- Lady Hope, a fictional character in the Sherlock Holmes short story "The Adventure of the Second Stain"
- Camellia japonica 'Lady Hope', a sport of Camellia japonica 'Prince Frederick William'
