= Summit tram stop =

Tram stop in Llandudno, Wales

Summit
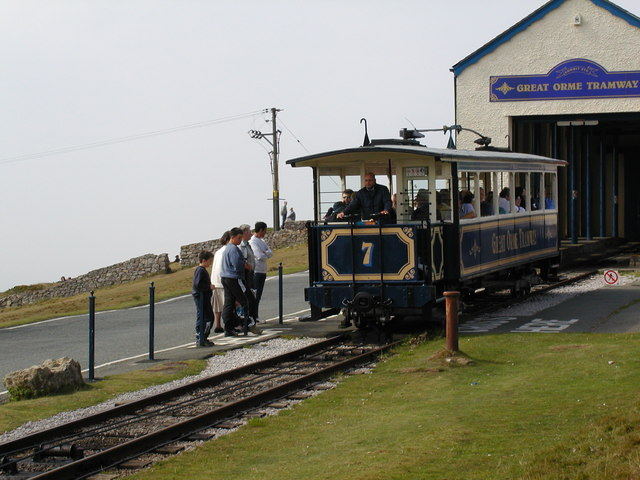
- Summit Tram Station

General information
- Location: Llandudno, Conwy; Wales
- Coordinates: 53.3323°N 3.8548°W
- System: Station on heritage railway
- Platforms: 1

History
- Original company: Great Orme Tramway

Key dates
- 8 July 1903: Opened
Location

The Summit tram stop is a tram terminus situated on the Great Orme Tramway at the summit of the Great Orme in Llandudno, Wales. The Great Orme Tramway is a funicular, which connects the summit with a lower terminus at Victoria in the centre of Llandudno. From the summit station, access is available to the Great Orme Country Park Visitor Centre, the Summit Complex and cafe, a large outdoor playground, and the many walks on the Orme.

Trams run approximately every ten minutes to the Summit station, decreasing to every twenty minutes in off-peak times or during windy weather. Trams run seasonally only, from late March to late October.

Preceding station	Heritage railways	Following station
Halfway (Great Orme)	Great Orme Tramway; Upper Section	Terminus
