= Llandudno Victoria tram stop =

Tram stop in Llandudno, Wales

Llandudno Victoria
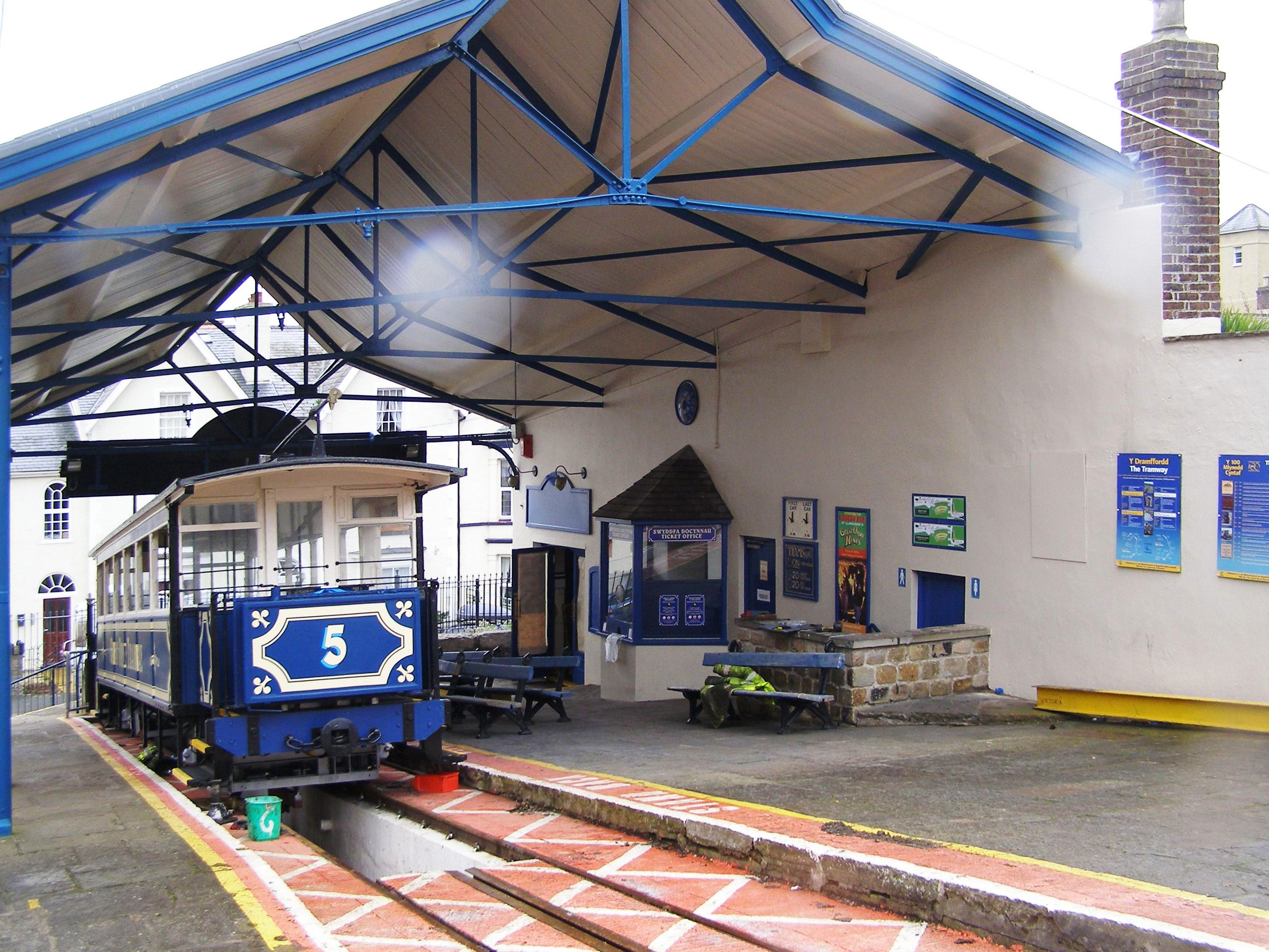
- The terminus during the closed season

General information
- Location: Llandudno, Conwy; Wales
- Coordinates: 53.3272°N 3.8356°W
- Grid reference: SU587324
- System: Station on heritage railway
- Platforms: 1

History
- Original company: Great Orme Tramway

Key dates
- 31 July 1902: Station opened
- 8 July 1903: Line extended to Summit
Location

Llandudno Victoria tram stop is the lower terminus of the Great Orme Tramway, situated in the centre of the town of Llandudno, Wales. The Great Orme Tramway is a funicular, which connects this terminus to the Halfway and Summit stops on the Great Orme.

Llandudno railway station, the town's main line station, is a 15-minute walk from Victoria.

Trams run approximately every twenty minutes, increasing to every ten minutes in peak hours, to Halfway station, where passengers change cars to the summit. Trams run seasonally only, from late March to late October.

Preceding station	Heritage railways	Following station
Terminus	Great Orme Tramway; Lower Section	Halfway
