= Halfway tram stop =

Halfway tram stop may refer to:

- Halfway tram stop (Great Orme) on the Great Orme Tramway in Llandudno
- Halfway tram stop (Sheffield), the terminus of the Sheffield Supertram Blue Line
