= Great Orme Tramway =

Cable tramway in North Wales

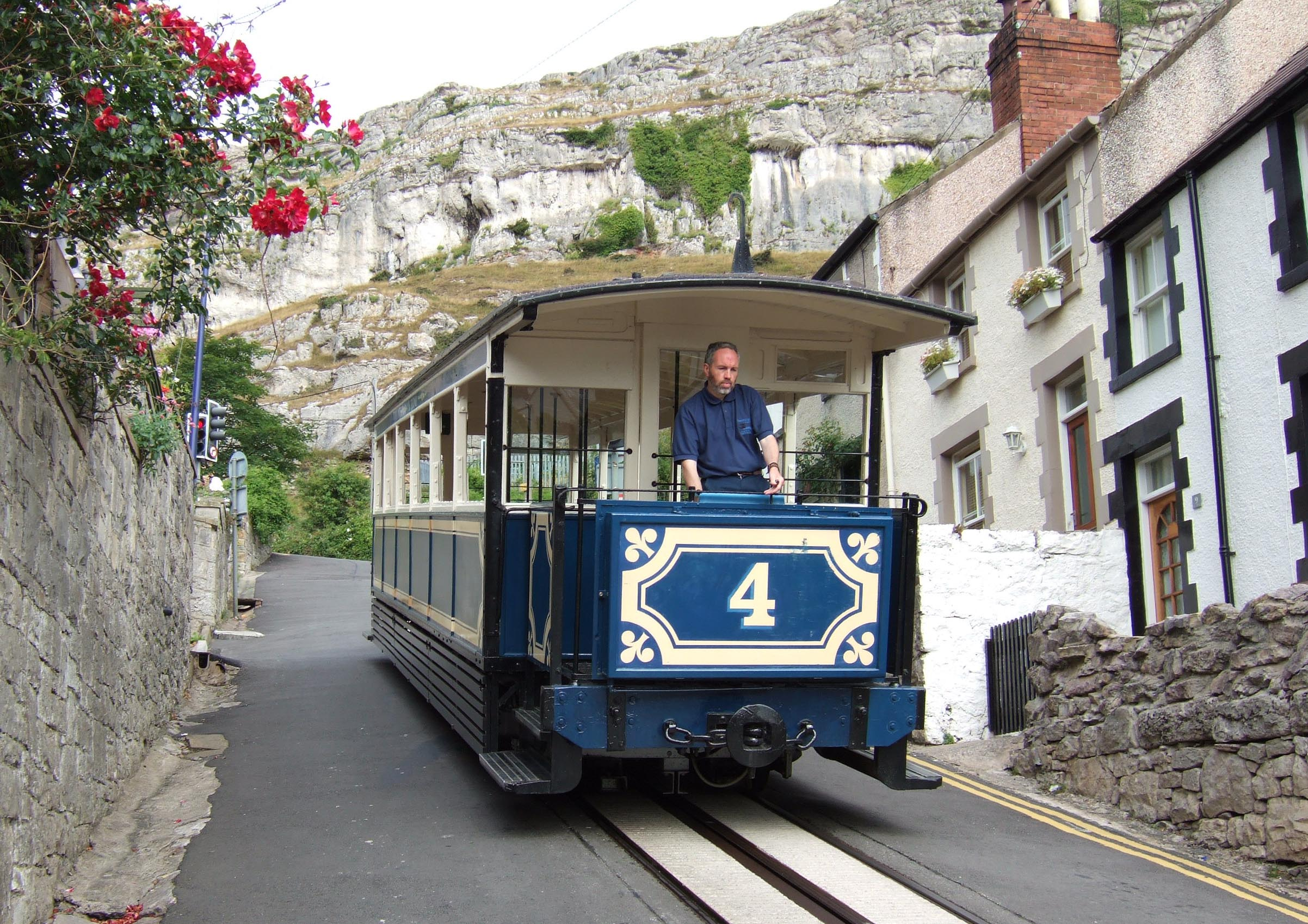

Overview
- Status: Operational
- Locale: Llandudno, Wales
- Coordinates: 53.3321°N 3.8544°W
- Stations: 3 open + 3 disused

Service
- Type: Funicular
- Operator: Conwy County Borough Council
- Depot: Halfway Station depot

History
- Opened: 1902

Technical
- Number of tracks: Single track with passing loop
- Track gauge: 3 ft 6 in (1,067 mm)
- Operating speed: 5 mph (8 km/h) running speed

The Great Orme Tramway (Welsh: Tramffordd y Gogarth) is a cable-hauled 3 ft 6 in (1,067 mm) gauge tramway in Llandudno in north Wales. Open seasonally from late March to late October, it takes over 200,000 passengers each year from Llandudno Victoria Station to just below the summit of the Great Orme headland. From 1932 onwards it was known as the Great Orme Railway, reverting to its original name in 1977.

It is Great Britain's only remaining cable-operated street tramway, and one of only a few surviving in the world, and it is owned by Conwy County Borough Council. The line comprises two sections, where each section is an independent funicular and passengers change cars at the Halfway station. Whilst the upper section runs on its own right of way and is similar to many other funicular lines, the lower section is an unusual street-running funicular.

Whilst the street-running section resembles the better-known San Francisco cable cars, its operation is quite different in that it adheres to the funicular principle where the cars are permanently fixed to the cable and are stopped and started by stopping and starting the cable, unlike San Francisco where cars attach to, and detach from, a continuously running cable. As such, this section's closest relatives are Lisbon's Glória, Bica, and Lavra street funiculars.

== History ==
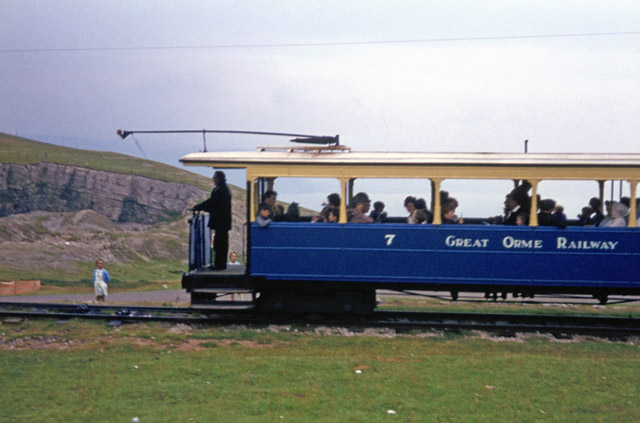
Tram 7 in 1968, carrying the Great Orme Railway livery and name of that time

Great Orme Tramways Act 1898
- Act of Parliament
- Parliament of the United Kingdom
- Long title: An Act for incorporating the Great Orme Tramways Company and for authorising the Company to make and maintain a Tramway and Tramroad from Llandudno to or near the summit of the Great Ormeshead in the county of Carnarvon.
- Citation: 61 & 62 Vict. c. xxvii

Dates
- Royal assent: 23 May 1898

Text of statute as originally enacted

Authority to build the tramway was granted by the Great Orme Tramways Act 1898 (61 & 62 Vict. c. xxvii), and construction started in 1901. The tramway was opened in its two stages: the lower section on 31 July 1902 and the upper on 8 July 1903. The original power house, at the Halfway station between the lower and upper sections, was equipped with winding gear powered by steam from coke-fired boilers. Communication between the power house and the tram cars was provided by a telegraph system, operating over an overhead wire and trolley poles on the cars.

The line was initially provided with seven cars, three freight cars numbered 1 to 3 and four passenger cars numbered 4 to 7. The passenger cars were each named after a local Welsh Christian saint and are still in service. The freight cars were for the carriage of goods and parcels, as stipulated in the tramway's original act of Parliament, but were withdrawn from service by 1911. The freight vans were also used to carry coffins for burial at the church on Great Orme. There were two methods of using the freight tramcars: they could be placed on the track ahead of a passenger tram, and propelled up the incline, or the cable could be detached from a passenger tram and attached instead to a freight tram, which then operated alone up the incline. All seven trams were fitted with couplings that would have allowed the passenger trams to tow the freight trams, but there is no evidence that this type of operation ever actually occurred.

The line suffered a serious accident and consequent financial difficulties in the 1930s, resulting in its sale in 1935 to the Great Orme Railway company. In 1949, Llandudno Urban District Council exercised its power, granted by the original act of parliament, to buy the line. Ownership of the line has since passed to Aberconwy Borough Council and then Conwy County Borough Council as a result of local government reorganisations.

The original steam power was replaced in 1958 by electrically powered apparatus. In 1977, the line reverted to the Great Orme Tramway name that it had carried before its sale in 1935. Between 1999 and 2001, the line received £1 million of funding from the European Union, together with a further £1 million from the Heritage Lottery Fund and matching funds from its owner. As a result, in 2001, the entire Halfway station, its control room and its power plant were completely rebuilt and re-equipped. At the same time the overhead wire telegraph communication system was replaced with an induction-loop system.

== Operation ==
=== Route ===
The tramway has three main stops, a lower station called Llandudno Victoria after the hotel that formerly occupied the station site, the aptly named Halfway stop, and the Great Orme Summit stop. Passengers must change trams at the Halfway stop as the upper and lower funicular sections are physically separate. The two sections operate independently, with two cars on each section. As one car is ascending, the other is descending, and they pass at passing loops in the middle of each section.

The lower section is built in or alongside the public road and has gradients as steep as 1 in 3.8 (26.15%). The track throughout this section is laid as grooved rail within the road surface, and the cable lies below the road surface in a conduit between the rails. The bottom half of the section is single-track, but above the passing loop it has interlaced double track. By contrast, the upper section is less steep, with a maximum gradient of 1 in 10 (10%). The track is laid on sleepers and ballast, and the cable runs between the rails as is normal for most funiculars. The track is single apart from a short double-track passing loop equipped with points actuated by the flanges of the passing cars. The rails are interrupted to accommodate the cable.

=== Stations ===
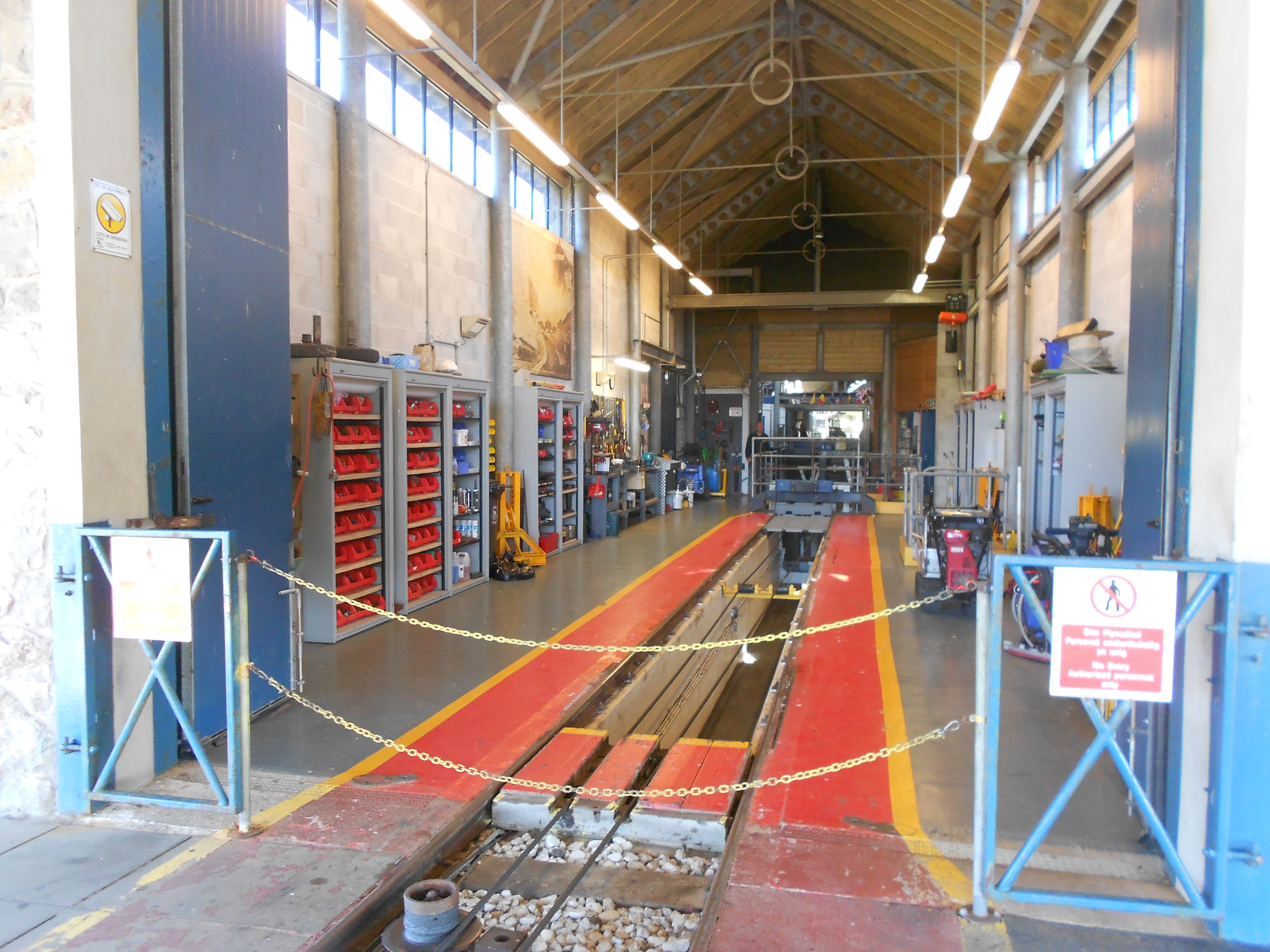
One of the two engineering bays in the Halfway maintenance depot.

The Great Orme Tramway refers to all its fixed boarding and alighting locations as stations (not tram stops). Three are currently in regular use, named Victoria Station, Halfway Station, and Summit Station. Three others, all request stops, are currently disused, namely Black Gate, Ty'n-y-Coed, and Killen's Hill stations.

As well as being the point at which passengers change cars, the Halfway stop is also the control centre for the line. The electric motors driving the cables that propel the cars are in the central building of the stop, as are the winchmen who control them. This in turn leads to a further difference between the two sections. With the drive at the top of the lower section, there are only two haulage cables, from the Halfway stop to each car. As the upper section has its drive at the bottom of the section, a third cable is needed that connects the two cars via a sheave at the Summit stop.

Halfway stop is also the location of the engineering depot, with access for trams from both upper and lower sections. Engineers have depot facilities for inspection and maintenance of the trams, including inspection pits. Although there is no public access to the depot, some parts of both the depot and the control room can be viewed by passengers through internal glazing in the viewing area, whilst interchanging between upper and lower sections.

=== Communication ===
The line is controlled by a pair of winchmen, one per section and stationed in the Halfway power house, who control the speed and direction of rotation of the cable, and hence the cars attached to the cable. They are assisted by attendants on each car, who are in communication with the winchmen using an induction-loop radio system. Before the introduction of this radio system, messages were passed using an overhead wire telegraph and trolley poles on the tram cars. The overhead wire has since been removed, but the cars still carry the trolley poles.

=== Fleet ===
The tramway still operates entirely with original vehicles, dating from the line's opening.

Tram number	Tram name	Type	Entered service	Notes
1	No name	16 feet 7 inches (5,050 mm) four-wheel freight tram car	1902	Withdrawn in (or by) 1911
2	No name	16 feet 7 inches (5,050 mm) four-wheel freight tram car	1902	Withdrawn in (or by) 1911
3	No name	16 feet 7 inches (5,050 mm) four-wheel freight tram car	1902	Withdrawn in (or by) 1911
4	St Tudno	37 feet (11,000 mm) bogie passenger tram car	1902	Still in service
5	St Silio	37 feet (11,000 mm) bogie passenger tram car	1902	Still in service
6	St Seiriol	37 feet (11,000 mm) bogie passenger tram car	1902	Still in service
7	St Trillo	37 feet (11,000 mm) bogie passenger tram car	1902	Still in service

== Incidents ==
- The tramway suffered its only fatal accident on 23 August 1932, when a drawbar failure on car number 4 caused a derailment and subsequent collision with a wall, killing the tram's driver and a 12-year-old passenger; ten further passengers suffered serious injuries. The failure was apparently caused by the drawbar's manufacture from a steel alloy which was not suited to this type of use; a 1933 report also highlighted the fact that the emergency brakes did not function at the time of the crash. Following the accident the tramway was closed until 1934 while safety improvements were carried out, and reopened under new ownership after the original company was wound up.
- On Sunday 30 April 2000, on the day of the Llandudno Transport Festival, 37 passengers were injured with 17 requiring hospital treatment following a head-on collision between trams 6 and 7 on the passing loop of the upper section. The cause of the accident, described as the most serious since the opening in 1902, was initially thought to be a points problem. The investigation by Her Majesty’s Railway Inspectorate concluded that the two people responsible for surveying the position of the point did not notice the incorrect position because their training had been inadequate.
- Shortly after midday on 15 September 2009, two trams on the upper section collided at the passing loop above Halfway station. No serious injuries were reported, but both the Rail Accident Investigation Branch and the owners and operators, Conwy County Borough Council, launched investigations. The RAIB published their report in 2010. The report concluded that the forces of wheels in the upper bogie of car 6 could move the point into the wrong position and this made the lower bogie run on the track of car 7. Wear of the rails and the point mechanism had allowed this result.

== Gallery ==
A selection of views of the line, from lower station to summit:

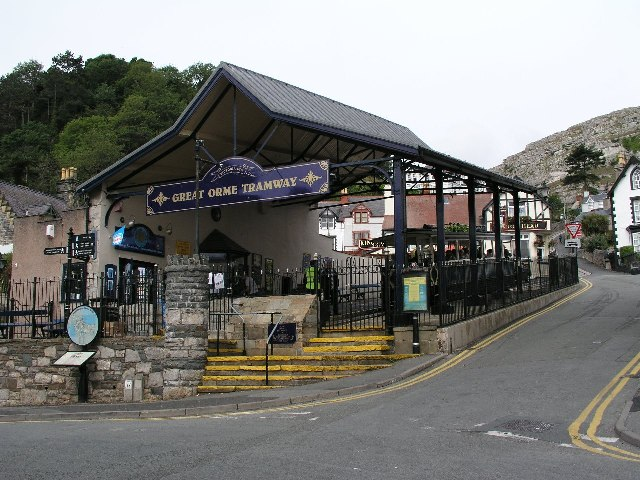
Victoria station at the foot of the line

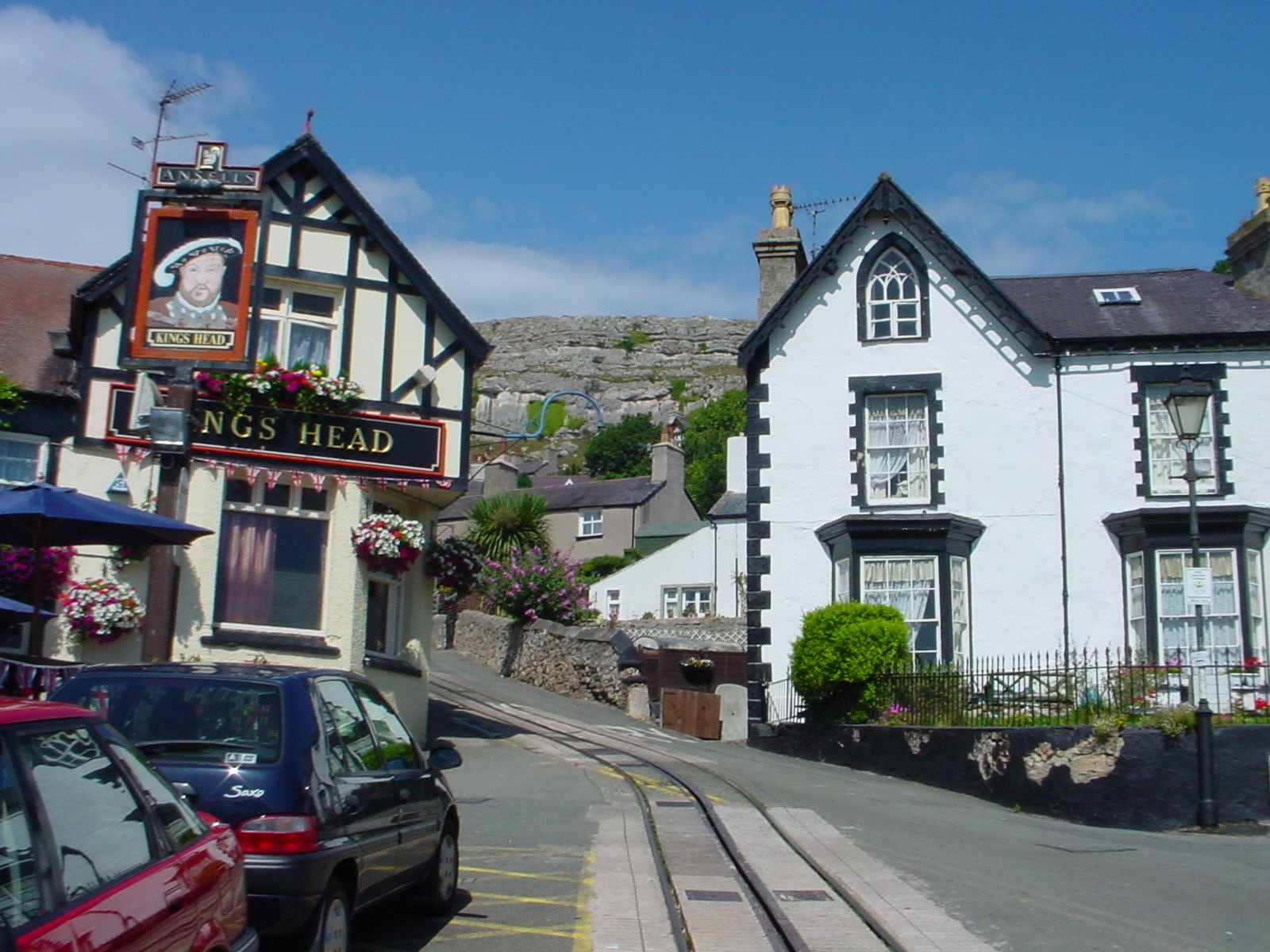
The line ascending Old Road, seen from Victoria Station

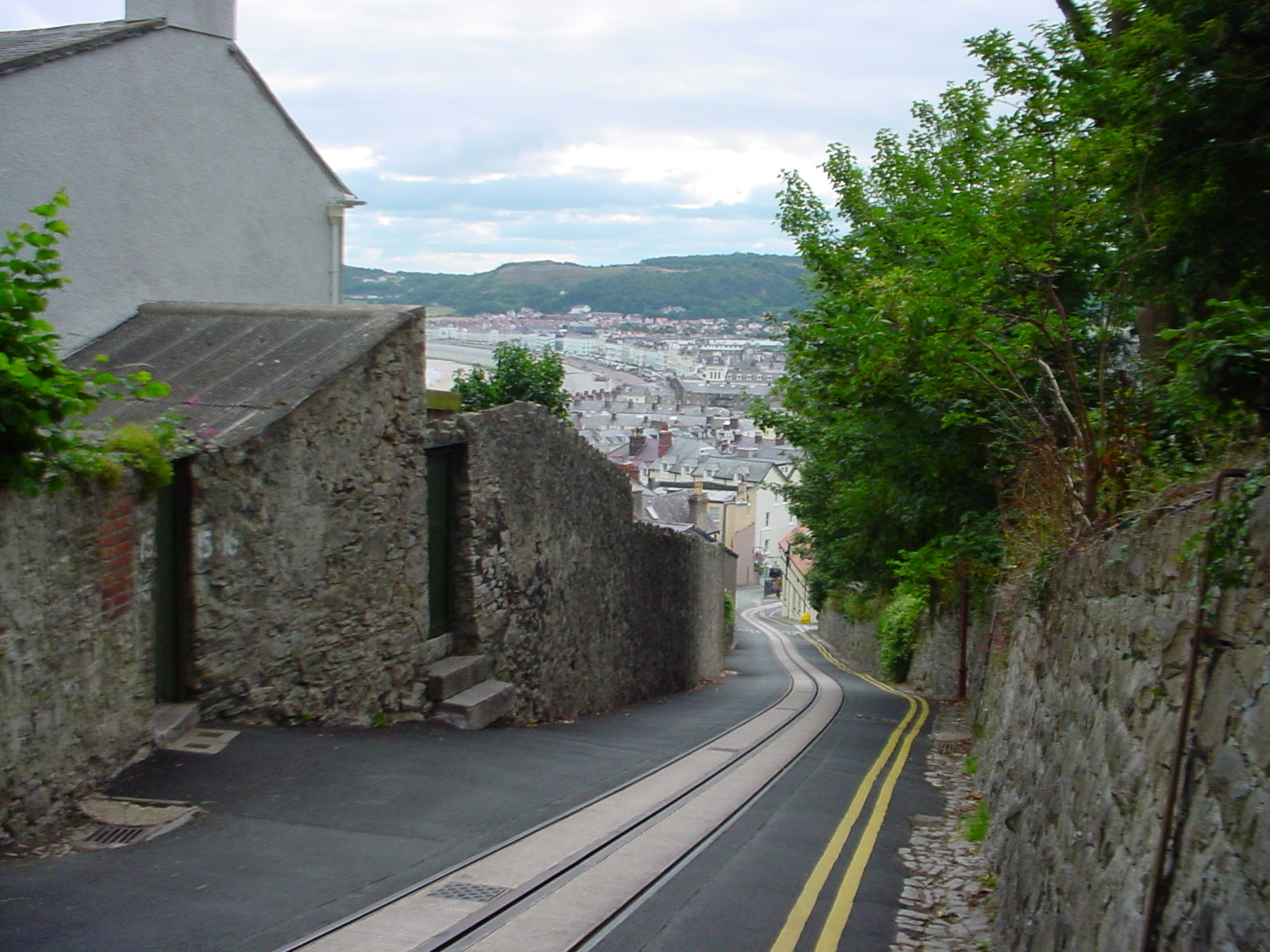
Looking down Old Road and over Llandudno Bay.

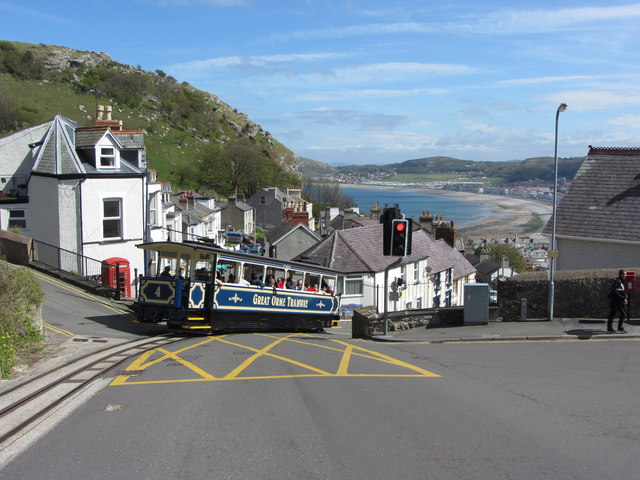
Tram descends across Ty Gwyn Road into Old Road

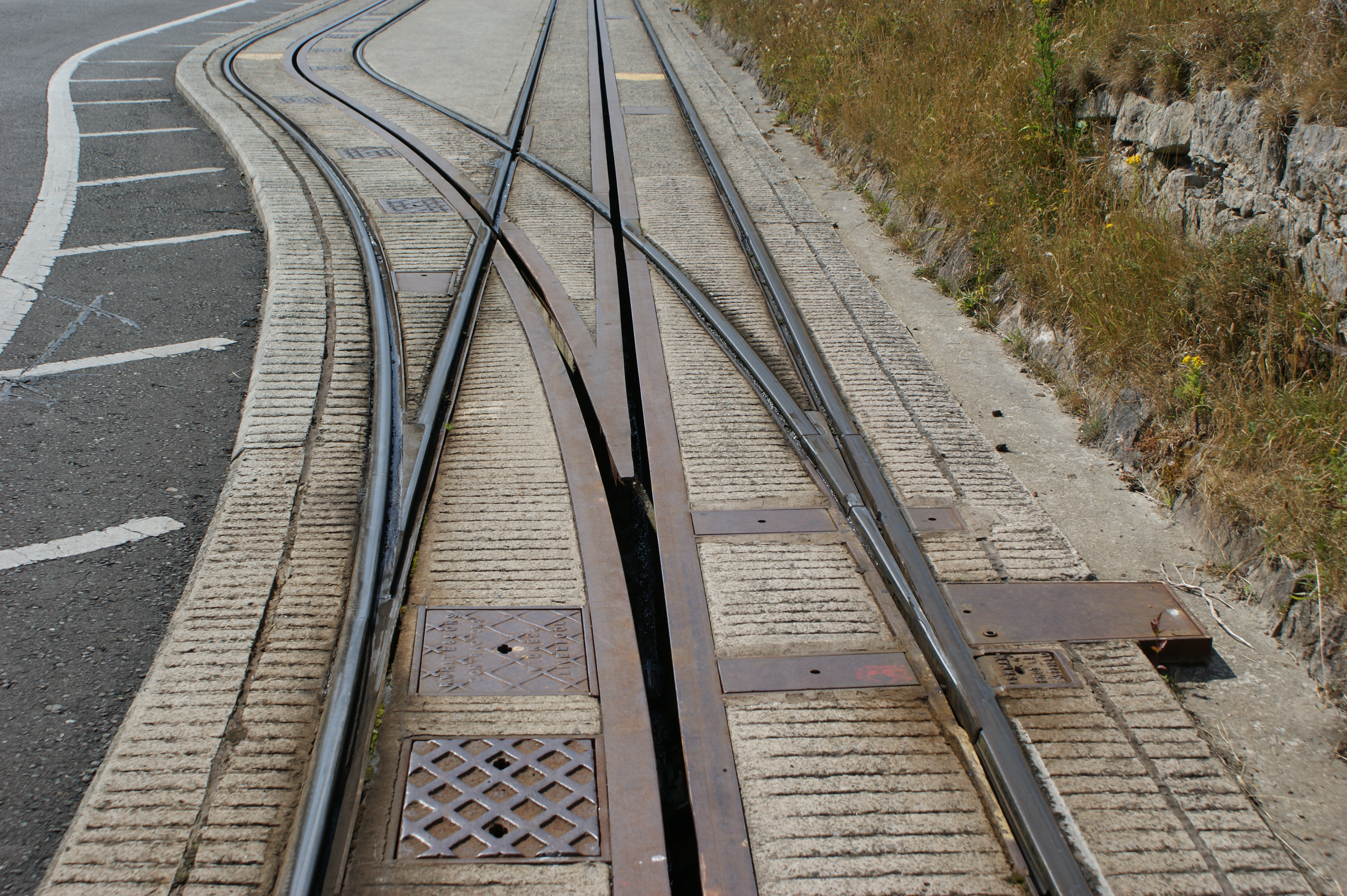
Detail of cable slot and pointwork at the lower section passing loop

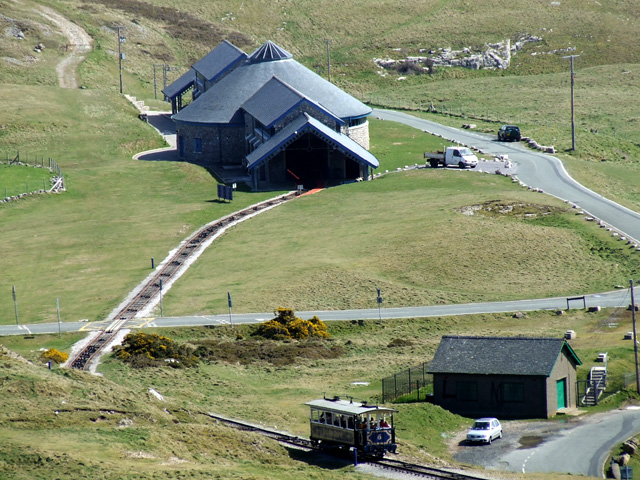
Halfway station seen from above

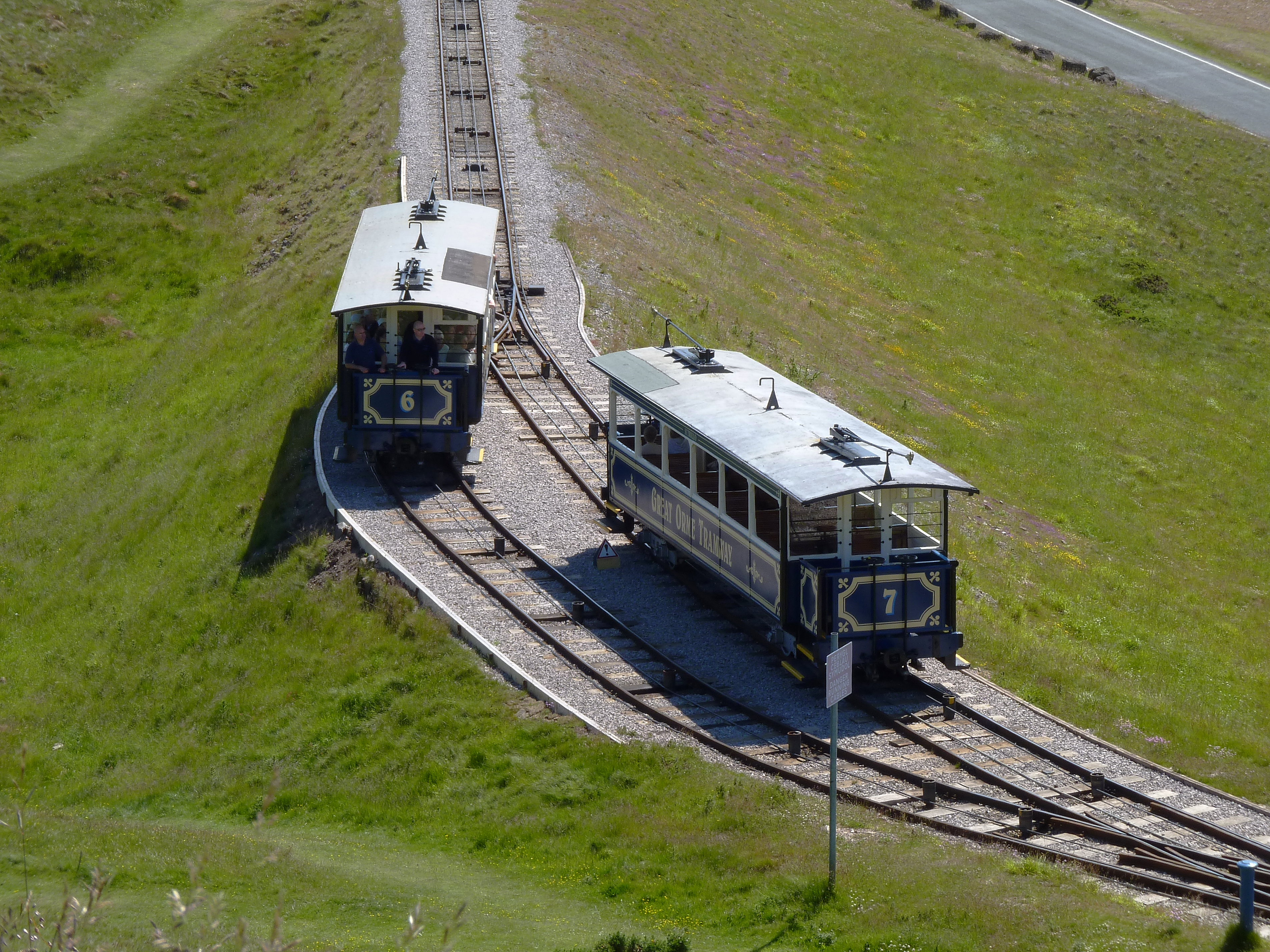
Cars passing at the upper section passing loop

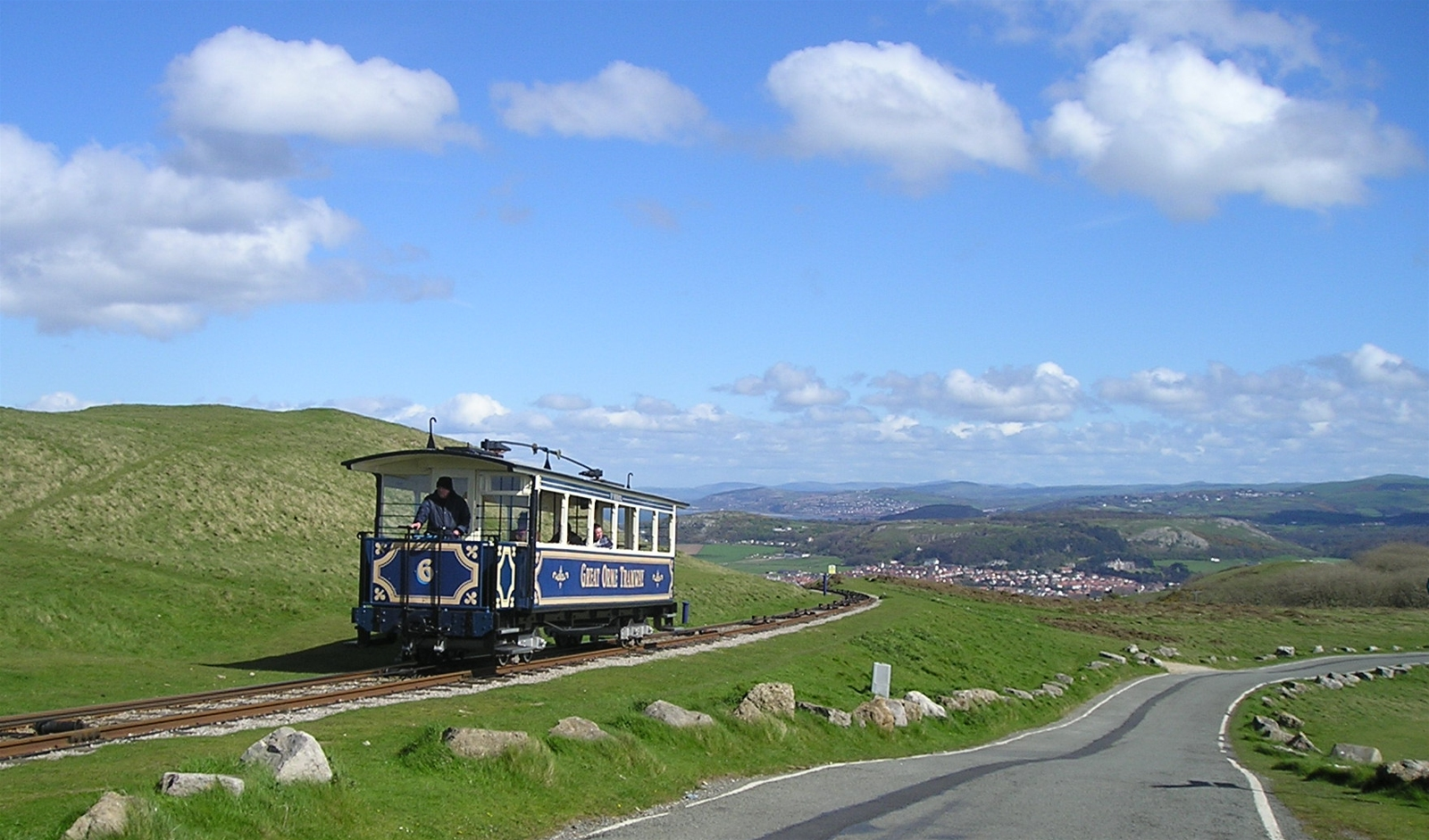
Tram No. 6 nearing the summit of the Great Orme

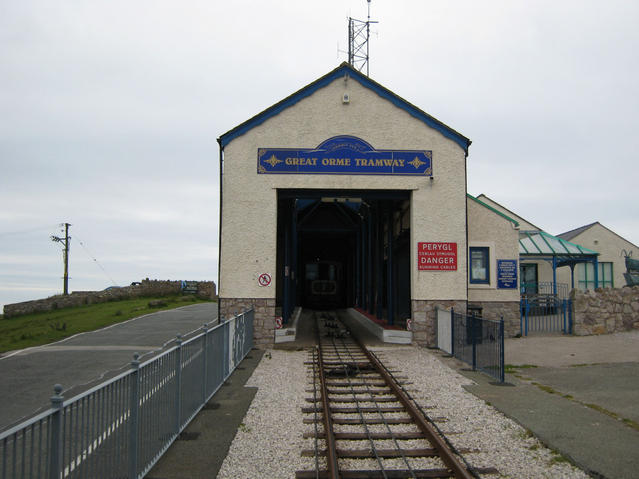
The upper station

== See also ==
- List of funicular railways
- Llandudno Cable Car
