= Halfway tram stop (Great Orme) =

Tram stop in Llandudno, Wales

Halfway (Great Orme)
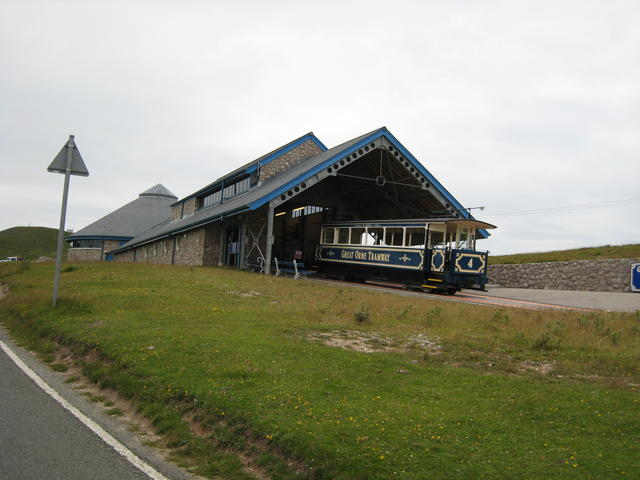
- Halfway Tram Station seen from below

General information
- Location: Llandudno, Conwy; Wales
- Coordinates: 53.3308°N 3.8444°W
- System: Station on heritage railway
- Platforms: 2

History
- Original company: Great Orme Tramway

Key dates
- 31 July 1902: Lower platform opened
- 8 July 1903: Higher platform opened
Location

The Halfway tram stop is a tram stop situated at the midpoint of the Great Orme Tramway on the slopes of the Great Orme in Llandudno, Wales. The Great Orme Tramway operates as a two-section funicular, and passengers must change at Halfway between the lower section (to and from the Victoria stop) and the upper section (to and from the Summit stop). The stop is also convenient for the nearby Bronze Age Copper Mines.

As well as being the point at which passengers change cars, the Halfway stop is also the control centre for the Great Orme Tramway. The electric motors which drive the cables that propel the cars are located in the central building of the stop, as are the winchmen who control them.

Trams run approximately every ten minutes to the Summit stop, and roughly every twenty minutes to Victoria, increasing to ten minutes in peak hours. Trams run seasonally only, from late March to late October.

Preceding station	Heritage railways	Following station
Terminus	Great Orme Tramway; Upper Section	Summit
Llandudno Victoria	Great Orme Tramway; Lower Section	Terminus
