= Camellia japonica 'The Czar' =

Flowering plant cultivar

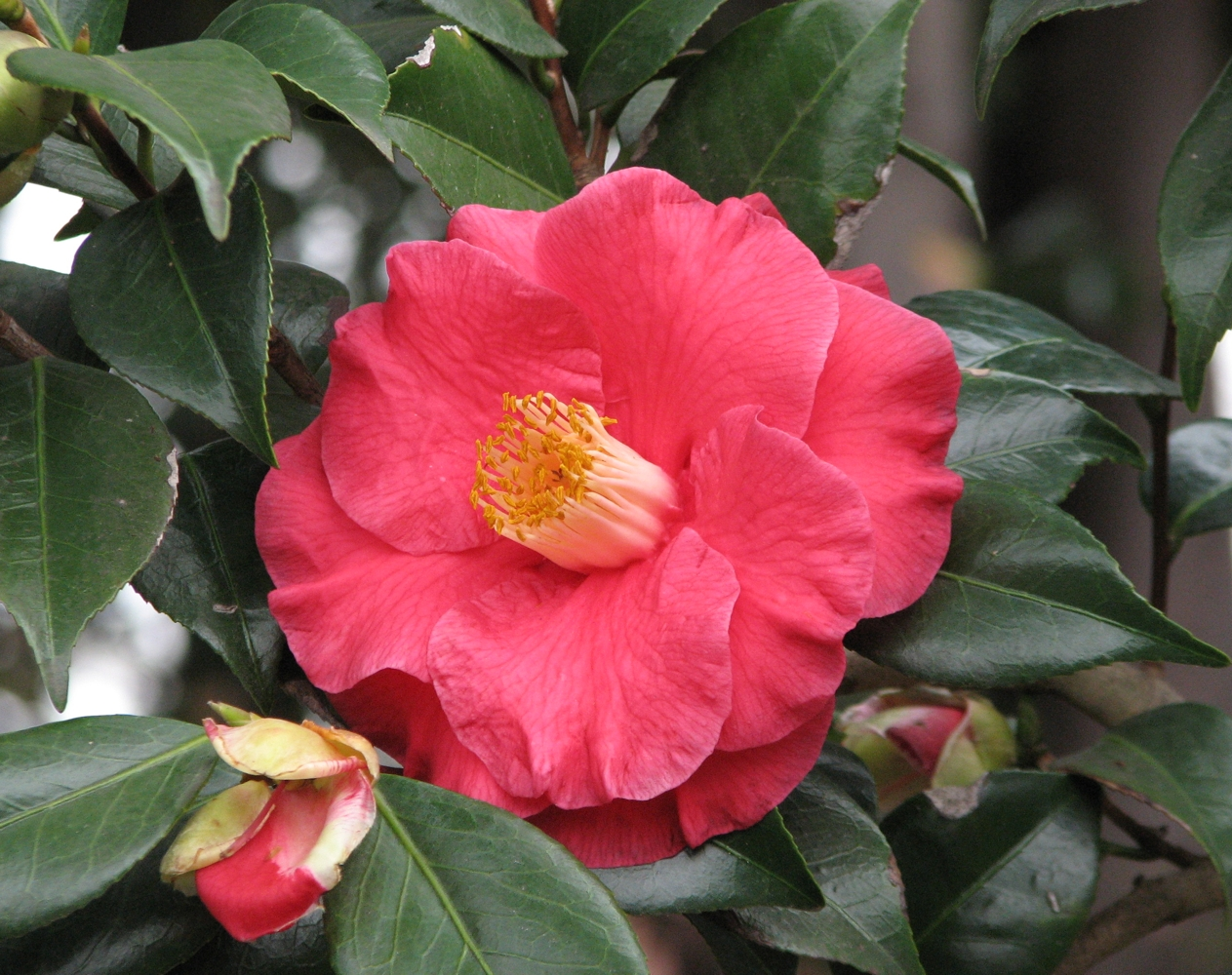
- A flower of the original plant in the Royal Botanic Gardens in Melbourne.
- Species: Camellia japonica
- Cultivar: 'The Czar'
- Origin: Melbourne, Australia

Camellia japonica 'The Czar' is a camellia cultivar that originated in Australia in 1913.

== Description ==
'The Czar' grows to a height of 2 metres (6.6 ft) and has large light crimson, semi-double flowers up to 13–15 centimetres (5–6 in) across with prominent yellow stamens.

== History ==
The plant was thought to have originated from a seedling selected by landscape gardener Neil Breslin of Camberwell, Victoria. Following Breslin's death in 1912, Mr. R. W. Hodgins of Hodgins Nurseries in Essendon noticed the plant in the garden and was so impressed by the beauty of the flowers that he purchased all the stock plants from his daughter, aside from the original shrub which was thought to be too large to be moved. This original plant was eventually relocated to the Royal Botanic Gardens, Melbourne in 1952.

Hodgkins built up a stock of some eight hundred plants of the camellia. He had difficulty selling the variety, eventually resorting to practically giving the plants away at prices that varied from two shillings and sixpence to five shillings for each plant. Discouraged by this experience, he stopped propagating the variety. It was only about twenty years later, when these plants had grown into large bushes, that people began to take notice and appreciate this new variety. By 1936 'The Czar' was regarded as "one of the finest of the single camellias".

== Related cultivars ==
'The Czar' has two registered sports: Camellia japonica 'Hugh Kennedy' and Camellia japonica 'Fiona Capp'. There is also Camellia japonica 'The Czar Variegated' — a virus variegated form of 'The Czar' originating from Camellia Lodge Nursery in Noble Park, Victoria in 1959.

== See also ==
- Camellia japonica 'Prince Frederick William'
