= List of shipwrecks in August 1829 =

The list of shipwrecks in August 1829 includes some ships sunk, wrecked or otherwise lost during August 1829.

== 1 August ==
List of shipwrecks: 1 August 1829
| Ship | State | Description |
|---|---|---|
| John | United Kingdom | The ship was driven ashore in the Delaware River, United States. |
| Rhoda | United Kingdom | The ship ran aground and capsized in the Humber at Oysterness, Yorkshire with the loss of a crew member. She was on a voyage from Hamburg to Goole, Yorkshire. |

== 3 August ==
List of shipwrecks: 3 August 1829
| Ship | State | Description |
|---|---|---|
| Grace | United Kingdom | The ship was lost near Rosehearty, Aberdeenshire with the loss of all hands. She was on a voyage from Sunderland, County Durham to Macduff, Aberdeenshire. |
| Milford | United Kingdom | The ship was wrecked on the Long Sand, off Kedgeree, Bengal, India. |
| Rommany | United Kingdom | The ship was lost near Kedgeree. |

== 4 August ==
List of shipwrecks: 4 August 1829
| Ship | State | Description |
|---|---|---|
| Active | United Kingdom | The ship was driven ashore at the "Burn of Boyndee". Her crew were rescued. |
| Ann | United Kingdom | The ship was driven ashore and wrecked at Portgordon, Morayshire. Her crew were rescued. |
| Anna Maria | United Kingdom | The ship was driven ashore and wrecked west of Gardenstown, Aberdeenshire with the loss of all on board. |
| Barbara and Ann | United Kingdom | The ship was driven ashore at the mouth of the River Spey. |
| Catherine | United Kingdom | The ship was driven ashore at the "Burn of Boyndee". Her crew were rescued. |
| Endeavour | United Kingdom | The ship foundered in the North Sea off Nairn with the loss of all hands. |
| Lively | United Kingdom | The ship was driven ashore 3 nautical miles (5.6 km) west of Speymouth, Morayshire. |
| Lizard | United Kingdom | The ship was driven ashore 3 nautical miles (5.6 km) west of Speymouth. |
| Success | United Kingdom | The ship was driven ashore and wrecked near the "Burn of Boyndee". Her crew were rescued. |

== 5 August ==
List of shipwrecks: 5 August 1829
| Ship | State | Description |
|---|---|---|
| Driver | (United Kingdom of Great Britain and Ireland) Saint Vincent | The schooner capsized whilst on a voyage from Saint Barthélemy to Saint Vincent with the loss of four of the twelve people on board. |

== 7 August ==
List of shipwrecks: 7 August 1829
| Ship | State | Description |
|---|---|---|
| Americano | Kingdom of Sardinia | The ship was wrecked on Carreras, near Montevideo, Uruguay. |

== 9 August ==
List of shipwrecks: 9 August 1829
| Ship | State | Description |
|---|---|---|
| Crimonmogate | United Kingdom | The ship was wrecked on Anticosti Island, Lower Canada, British North America. Her crew were rescued. |
| Whim | United Kingdom | The ship was in collision with the schooner Navarino in the North Sea off Spurn Head, Yorkshire and sank. Her crew were rescued. |

== 10 August ==
List of shipwrecks: 10 August 1829
| Ship | State | Description |
|---|---|---|
| Foxhound | (United Kingdom of Great Britain and Ireland) New South Wales | The cutter was wrecked whilst on a voyage from the Five Islands to Port Jackson with the loss of all eight crew. |

== 11 August ==
List of shipwrecks: 11 August 1829
| Ship | State | Description |
|---|---|---|
| John Wells | United Kingdom | The ship ran aground on the Joe Flogger Shoal, in the Delaware River, United States. |

== 12 August ==
List of shipwrecks: 12 August 1829
| Ship | State | Description |
|---|---|---|
| Friends | United Kingdom | The ship was wrecked near Nidingen, Sweden. Her crew were rescued. She was on a voyage from Hull, Yorkshire to Saint Petersburg, Russia. |

== 13 August ==
List of shipwrecks: 13 August 1829
| Ship | State | Description |
|---|---|---|
| Air Balloon | United Kingdom | The ship sprang a leak and foundered in the North Sea off Scarborough, Yorkshire. She was on a voyage from Sunderland, County Durham to Chatham, Kent. She was refloated on 21 August and taken into Scarborough. |
| Betsey | United Kingdom | The ship was wrecked at Kingstown, County Dublin with the loss of five of the eighteen people on board. She was on a voyage from Liverpool, Lancashire to Dundalk, County Louth. |
| Duke | United Kingdom | The brig was wrecked in Sandy Cove. All eleven people on board were rescued. She was on a voyage from Whitehaven, Cumberland to Dublin. |
| Jean and Bell | United Kingdom | The ship foundered in the Irish Sea off Westport, County Mayo. She was on a voyage from Westport to Liverpool, Lancashire. |

== 14 August ==
List of shipwrecks: 14 August 1829
| Ship | State | Description |
|---|---|---|
| Aurora | United Kingdom | The ship was wrecked off the mouth of the River Tees. Her crew were rescued by the Redcar Lifeboat. |
| Camillus | United Kingdom | The sloop foundered in the Irish Sea a league (3 nautical miles (5.6 km)) off the Saltee Islands, County Wexford. |
| Friends | United Kingdom | The ship foundered in the North Sea off Hartlepool, County Durham. Her crew were rescued. |
| Hero | United Kingdom | The brig was driven ashore and wrecked at Scarborough, Yorkshire. Her crew were rescued by Feronia (United Kingdom). |
| London | United Kingdom | The ship was driven ashore at Hartlepool, County Durham. |
| Providence | United Kingdom | The ship was abandoned in the Irish Sea 40 nautical miles (74 km) west south west of the Smalls Lighthouse. Her crew were rescued. |
| Quest | United Kingdom | The ship was driven ashore and wrecked at Brighton, Sussex. Her crew were rescued. |
| Sea Nymph | United Kingdom | The ship was driven ashore at the mouth of the River Tees. Her crew were rescued by the Seaton Delaval Lifeboat. |

== 15 August ==
List of shipwrecks: 15 August 1829
| Ship | State | Description |
|---|---|---|
| Ant | United Kingdom | The ship was driven ashore near Wainfleet, Lincolnshire. Her crew were rescued. She was on a voyage from Hamburg to London. |
| Perseverance | United Kingdom | The ship sank at Bridlington, Yorkshire. |

== 16 August ==
List of shipwrecks: 16 August 1829
| Ship | State | Description |
|---|---|---|
| Lord Archibald Hamilton | United Kingdom | The brig was driven ashore and wrecked at Girdleness, Aberdeenshire. |

== 17 August ==
List of shipwrecks: 17 August 1829
| Ship | State | Description |
|---|---|---|
| Fame | (United Kingdom of Great Britain and Ireland) New South Wales | The brig sank at her moorings in Sydney Cove. |
| Norval | United Kingdom | The ship was wrecked on Skagen, Denmark. Her crew were rescued. She was on a voyage from Riga, Russia to Hull, Yorkshire. |
| Richard and Jane | United Kingdom | The schooner sprang a leak and foundered in the North Sea off the mouth of the Humber. |

== 18 August ==
List of shipwrecks: 18 August 1829
| Ship | State | Description |
|---|---|---|
| Dublin | United Kingdom | The ship was wrecked on Bornholm, Denmark. Her crew were rescued. She was on a voyage from Memel, Prussia to Dublin. |

== 19 August ==
List of shipwrecks: 19 August 1829
| Ship | State | Description |
|---|---|---|
| George | United Kingdom | The ship sprang a leak and was beached in "Fernis Bay". She was on a voyage from Troon, Ayrshire to Castletown, Isle of Man. |

== 20 August ==
List of shipwrecks: 20 August 1829
| Ship | State | Description |
|---|---|---|
| Louisa | United Kingdom | The brig was wrecked off Saugor, India. |
| Recovery | United Kingdom | The brig was abandoned in the Atlantic Ocean with the loss of one of her fourteen crew. Lyra (United Kingdom) rescued the survivors. Recovery was on a voyage from Trinidad to London. |

== 21 August ==
List of shipwrecks: 21 August 1829
| Ship | State | Description |
|---|---|---|
| Happy Return | United Kingdom | The trow was wrecked on the Dun Sand, in the River Severn. Her crew survived. |

== 22 August ==
List of shipwrecks: 22 August 1829
| Ship | State | Description |
|---|---|---|
| Earl Moira | United Kingdom | The ship sprang a leak and foundered in the English Channel off the Owers Sandbank. Her crew survived. She was on a voyage from Guernsey, Channel Islands to London. |

== 23 August ==
List of shipwrecks: 23 August 1829
| Ship | State | Description |
|---|---|---|
| Charles | United Kingdom | The ship was wrecked in the Atlantic Ocean during a hurricane. There were six survivors. She was on a voyage from Tobago to London. |
| Marjory | United Kingdom | The ship was driven ashore at Karlskrona, Sweden. |
| Nancy | United Kingdom | The ship was wrecked at Hythe, Kent. |

== 24 August ==
List of shipwrecks: 24 August 1829
| Ship | State | Description |
|---|---|---|
| Ann | United Kingdom | The sloop was in collision with the schooner Ariadne in the North Sea off Girdleness, Aberdeenshire and sank. All on board survived. |
| John and James | United Kingdom | The ship was driven ashore and wrecked in the Pentland Firth. |
| Monarch | United Kingdom | The ship sprang a leak and was abandoned in the Atlantic Ocean (49°00′N 29°00′W). Her crew were rescued by James (United Kingdom) before she foundered. Monarch was on a voyage from Liverpool, Lancashire to Quebec City, Lower Canada, British North America. |

== 25 August ==
List of shipwrecks: 25 August 1829
| Ship | State | Description |
|---|---|---|
| Four Friends | United Kingdom | The ship departed from Sunderland, County Durham for Scarborough, Yorkshire. Presumed subsequently foundered in the North Sea with the loss of all hands. A boat from the ship washed up at Filey, Yorkshire in early September. |

== 26 August ==
List of shipwrecks: 26 August 1829
| Ship | State | Description |
|---|---|---|
| Alert | United Kingdom | The brig was wrecked at Holyhead, Anglesey with the loss of all hands. |
| Lord Hill | United Kingdom | The ship was driven ashore at the mouth of the River Tees. |
| Mary | United Kingdom | The ship was wrecked at Padstow, Cornwall. Her crew were rescued. She was on a voyage from Bideford, Devon to Portreath, Cornwall. |

== 27 August ==
List of shipwrecks: 27 August 1829
| Ship | State | Description |
|---|---|---|
| Alert | United Kingdom | The ship foundered in the Irish Sea off Holyhead, Anglesey with the loss of all hands. |
| Alfred | United Kingdom | The ship foundered in the North Sea off Scarborough, Yorkshire. Her crew were rescued. |
| Davies Hall | United Kingdom | The ship foundered in the Irish Sea off Great Orme Head, Caernarfonshire. She was on a voyage from Liverpool, Lancashire to Beaumaris, Anglesey. |
| Harford | United Kingdom | The ship was wrecked on the Baggy Lip, in the Bristol Channel off the coast of Devon with the loss of all hands. She was on a voyage from Falmouth, Cornwall to Swansea, Glamorgan. |
| Helen | United Kingdom | The ship was driven ashore and wrecked in Cloughey Bay with the loss of five of the fourteen people on board. she was on a voyage from Greenock, Renfrewshire to Saint Thomas, Virgin Islands and Trinidad. |
| Liberty | United Kingdom | The ship was driven ashore at Ravenglass, Cumberland. |
| Liver | United Kingdom | The flat was driven ashore at the Point of Ayr with the loss of two of the four people on board. |
| Lord Ebrington | United Kingdom | The ship was driven ashore near Ballywalter, County Down. She was on a voyage from Ayr to Dublin. Lord Ebrington was refloated on 5 September and beached at Ballyferris, County Down. |
| Mary | United Kingdom | The ship foundered in the Bristol Channel off Padstow, Cornwall. Her crew were rescued. She was on a voyage from Bideford, Devon to St. Ives, Cornwall. |
| Minerva | United Kingdom | The ship was wrecked near Ballycastle, County Antrim with the loss of eight of her crew. She was on a voyage from Liverpool, Lancashire to "Wyburg". |
| Myrtle | United Kingdom | The ship was lost at Cemaes Bay, Anglesey with the loss of two of her crew. |
| Nancy | United Kingdom | The ship sprang a leak and was beached in the "Birken Isles". She was on a voyage from Liverpool to Wick, Caithness. |
| Sisters | United Kingdom | The ship was wrecked in Ramsay Sound. |
| Sophia | United Kingdom | The sloop was driven ashore and wrecked at Parton, Cumberland with the loss of all hands except her captain. |
| Thomas and Jane | United Kingdom | The ship was wrecked near Padstow with the loss of all hands. She was on a voyage from Cork to Southampton, Hampshire. |
| Vigilant | United Kingdom | The ship struck a sunken wreck and sank in the North SeaScarborough. Her four crew survived. |
| William M^{c}Gillaray | United Kingdom | The ship was lost near Newry, County Antrim. Her crew were rescued. She was on a voyage from Saint Petersburg, Russia to Newry. |

== 28 August ==
List of shipwrecks: 28 August 1829
| Ship | State | Description |
|---|---|---|
| Agestor | United Kingdom | The ship was wrecked on the Horns Sand, in the North Sea off the coast of Essex. |
| Camilla | United Kingdom | The ship was driven ashore at Caernarfon. She was on a voyage from Cocagne, New Brunswick, British North America to Liverpool, Lancashire. |
| Crisis | United Kingdom | The ship was wrecked on the Maplin Sand, in the North Sea off the coast of Essex. She was refloated on 13 September and taken in to the River Orwell. |
| Enterprise | United Kingdom | The ship was driven ashore at Filey, Yorkshire. Her crew were rescued. |
| Friends | United Kingdom | The barque was lost on the West Hoyle Sandbank, in Liverpool Bay with the loss of four of her twelve crew. |
| Graf von Munster | Kingdom of Hanover | The ship departed from Carolinensiel for Liverpool. No further trace, presumed foundered with the loss of all hands. |
| Helford | United Kingdom | The ship was wrecked on Baggy Point, Devon with the loss of all on board. She was on a voyage from Truro, Cornwall to Swansea, Glamorgan. |
| Lilly | United Kingdom | The ship was driven ashore and wrecked at Wallasey, Cheshire. |
| Martha | United Kingdom | The ship was wrecked near Fishguard, Pembrokeshire. She was on a voyage from Quebec City, Lower Canada, British North America to Fishguard. |
| Mary Ann | United Kingdom | The ship was driven ashore and wrecked in Widemouth Bay. |
| Minerva | United Kingdom | The ship was wrecked near Fair Head, County Antrim with the loss of eight lives. She was on a voyage from Liverpool to Vyborg, Grand Duchy of Finland. |
| Natches | Netherlands | The ship was lost near Blankenberge, West Flanders with the loss of all hands. She was on a voyage from "Maranzas" to Antwerp. |
| New Blessing | United Kingdom | The ship was driven ashore at Barmouth, Merionethshire. |
| Olive and Eliza | United Kingdom | The ship was driven ashore at Liverpool. She was on a voyage from New Orleans, Louisiana to . |
| Ploughman | United Kingdom | The ship was driven ashore at Upgang, Yorkshire. Her crew were rescued. She was on a voyage from Sunderland, County Durham to Rochester, Kent. |
| Rumbold | United Kingdom | The ship was lost in Carnarvon Bay. Her crew were rescued. She was on a voyage from Liverpool to London. |
| Swallow | United Kingdom | The ship was driven ashore in Carnarvon Bay. She was on a voyage from Liverpool to Newfoundland, British North America. |
| Tredegar | United Kingdom | The ship was driven ashore and wrecked in St Brides Bay. Her crew were rescued. |
| Vigilant | United Kingdom | The ship was driven ashore and wrecked at Scaleby Beck, Yorkshire. Her crew survived. She was on a voyage from South Shields, County Durham to Colchester, Essex |

== 29 August ==
List of shipwrecks: 29 August 1829
| Ship | State | Description |
|---|---|---|
| Ann | United Kingdom | The ship was driven ashore and wrecked 8 nautical miles (15 km) east of Calais, France. She was on a voyage from Hamburg to Plymouth, Devon. |
| Ant | United Kingdom | The ship was driven ashore near Happisburgh, Norfolk. Her crew were rescued. She was on a voyage from London to Goole, Yorkshire. |
| Concordia | United Kingdom | The schooner ran aground on the Newcombe Sand, in the English Channel off Dungeness, Kent and sank with the loss of two of her crew. Survivors were rescued by Tally-ho (United Kingdom). |
| Fanny | United Kingdom | The ship was driven ashore at Salthouse, Norfolk. Her crew were rescued. |
| Lara | United Kingdom | The ship was wrecked at Dungeness All on board were rescued. She was on a voyage from London to Corfu, Greece via Malta. |

== 30 August ==
List of shipwrecks: 30 August 1829
| Ship | State | Description |
|---|---|---|
| Alsinea | United Kingdom | The ship was wrecked on Götaland, Sweden. |

== Unknown date ==
List of shipwrecks: Unknown date in August 1829
| Ship | State | Description |
|---|---|---|
| Active | United Kingdom | The sloop was lost in Church Bay. |
| Catherine | United Kingdom | The ship was lost near Fishguard, Pembrokeshire She was on a voyage from Chester, Cheshire to Haverfordwest, Pembrokeshire. |
| Diligent | United Kingdom | The ship struck rocks and sank off Corley Point, County Limerick. Her crew were rescued. She was on a voyage from Irvine, Ayrshire to Dundalk, County Louth. |
| Friends | United Kingdom | The ship was lost in the Skaggerak before 20 August. |
| Lady Hope | United Kingdom | The ship was wrecked on Lanzarote, Canary Islands, Spain after 15 August. |
| Liberty | United Kingdom | The ship was lost between Baltimore and Castlehaven, County Cork. |
| Magdalene | United Kingdom | The ship was driven ashore and wrecked near Umago, Austrian Empire. She was on a voyage from Trieste to Smyrna, Greece. |
| Quest | United Kingdom | The ship was driven ashore and wrecked at Brighton, Sussex before 18 August. |
| Shepherd | United Kingdom | The ship was driven ashore and wrecked at Brighton before 18 August. |
| Spring | United Kingdom | The ship ran aground off the mouth of the Tyne. She consequently sprang a leak and was towed in to South Shields, County Durham, where she sank. Spring was on a voyage from Newport, Monmouthshire to Newcastle upon Tyne, Northumberland. |
| Tyne | United Kingdom | The ship was wrecked on the Heneaga Reef, Bahamas. |
| Volant | United Kingdom | The ship was driven ashore and severely damaged at Littlehampton, Sussex. She was refloated on 29 August and taken in to the harbour. |
| Wellington | United Kingdom | The ship was driven ashore at Fishguard. She was on a voyage from Liverpool to Riga, Russia. |
