= Llandudno Cable Car =

Aerial transit in Llandudno, Wales

Coordinates: 53.3293°N 3.8293°W

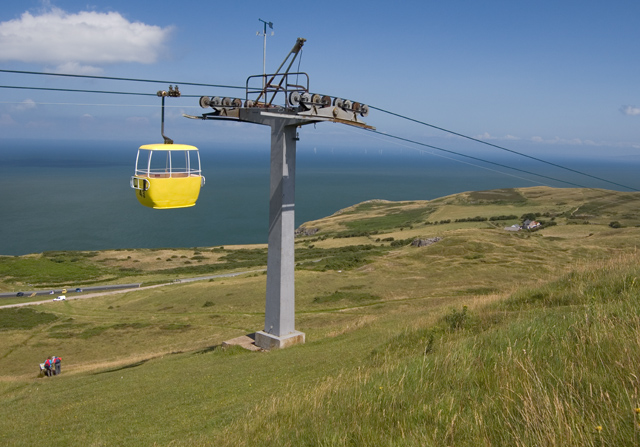
- Interactive map of Llandudno Cable Car

Overview
- Status: Operational
- Location: Llandudno, Wales
- Termini: Happy Valley; Great Orme Summit
- Open: 1969

Operation
- Owner: Llandudno Cable Car Ltd

Technical features
- Line length: 5,320 ft (1,620 m)
- Notes: Gondola lift Electric motor powering cable bullwheel

The Llandudno Cable Car is an attraction in the seaside resort of Llandudno in Conwy County Borough, Wales.

== Background ==
The cable car was opened in June 1969, and has been operational ever since.

The cable car is now owned by Kinetics Industrial Ltd.

== Operations ==
The lower station is situated on Aberdeen Hill in Happy Valley Gardens. The station is visible from the promenade and Llandudno Pier. Access, via some steps, is not suitable for wheelchair users. The upper station is next to the actual summit of the Great Orme. The cable car is visible from many locations surrounding Llandudno.

The cabins give views of the Irish Sea looking over to Rhyl and the Isle of Man, as well as the Snowdonia National Park.

The highest point from the ground is around 80 feet (24.38 m). The cable car runs along the Great Orme spanning a distance of one mile forty feet (1.622 km) exactly.

Nine pylons support the cable. There are currently 20 cabins in service, which leave each station at approximately one-minute intervals. The cabins are painted in red, yellow, orange, light blue and purple.

== Weather restrictions ==
The cable car cannot operate in wind speeds of over 22 mph (35 km/h) because of safety restrictions. It is often much calmer in Happy Valley but the wind is unpredictable at the summit, resulting in closures which may last a few minutes or a whole day. The cable cars also cannot operate in thunderstorms and might close if rain is too heavy.

The cable cars normally operate from the beginning of the Easter holidays to the end of the October half-term school holiday.

== Incidents ==
On 6 April 2007, a 33-year-old Polish woman fell to her death from a gondola at the route's highest point. A subsequent inquest recorded a verdict of suicide.

== See also ==
- Great Orme Tramway
