= Camellia japonica 'Prince Frederick William' =

Flowering plant cultivar

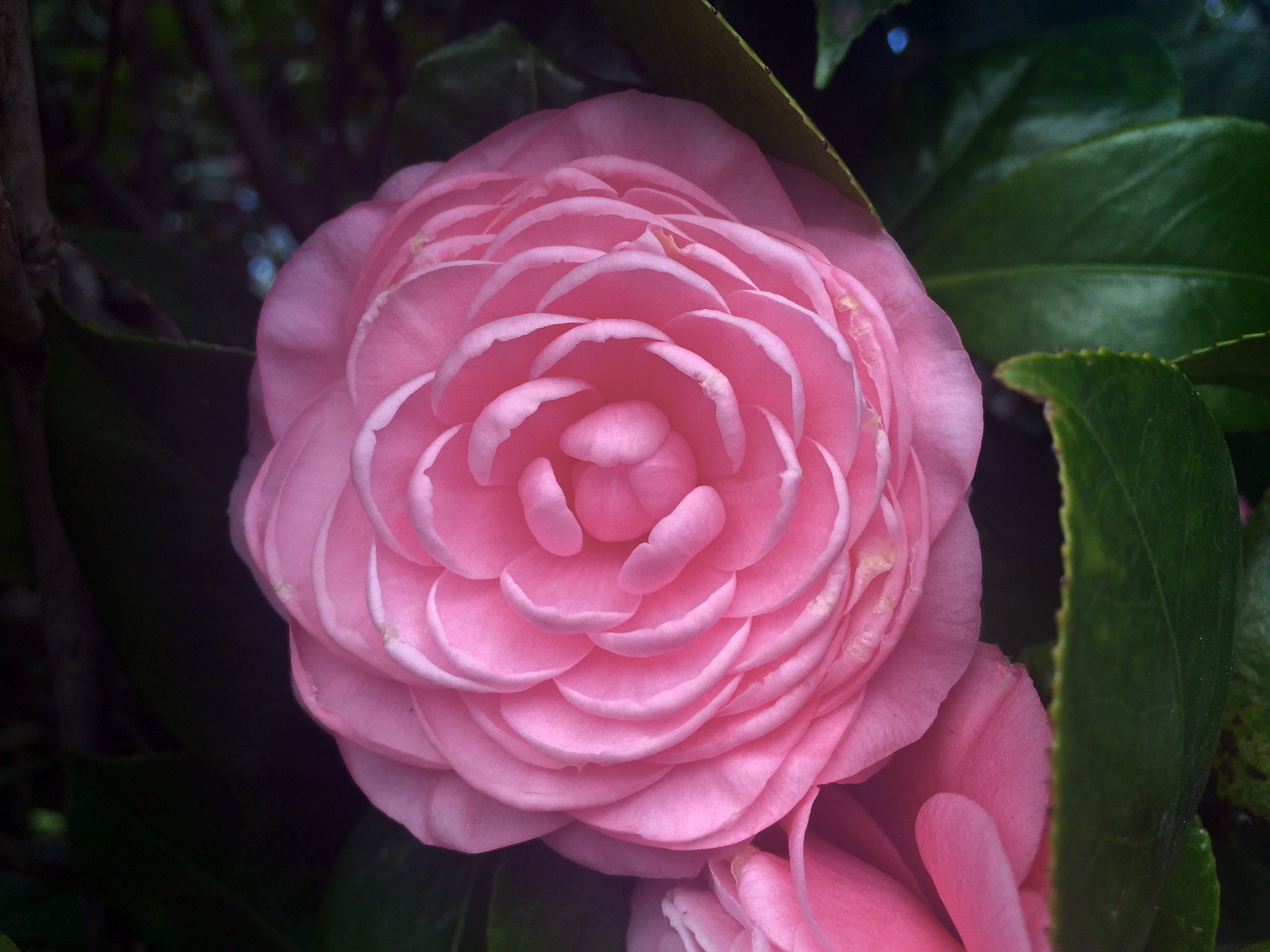
- Species: Camellia japonica
- Cultivar: 'Prince Frederick William'
- Origin: Parramatta, Australia

Camellia japonica 'Prince Frederick William' is an ornamental Camellia cultivar, believed to have originated from a seedling grown by Silas Sheather at his nursery in Parramatta, Australia. It was first described in the Sheather & Co. Nursery Catalogue in 1872 and is still a most popular camellia in Australia.

== Description ==
Camellia japonica 'Prince Frederick William' is a hardy, vigorous and erect shrub, with ovate, light green foliage. The flowers are light pink in color. The petals start cupped tightly around the bud and then open to a nearly flat formal double bloom.

Flowering is from June to September.

== History ==
In 1852 Silas Sheather leased land adjoining the Parramatta River on what was originally part of the 850 acres (3.4 km^{2}) of Elizabeth Farm, where he set up a nursery where he grew vegetables and fruits, and then later specializing in camellias. Sheather was regarded in his time as the most successful raiser of camellia cultivars in Australia and his nursery, Camellia Grove became a local landmark, admired for its marvellous display of camellias and other flowers. Fuller's Sydney Handbook of 1877 describes 59 varieties of camellias as being sold from Camellia Grove Nursery. Camellia and other flowers from Sheather's nursery were sent by steamship downriver to Searl's florist at Sydney Markets (one of the first florists in Sydney), tied in bunches and suspended from long pieces of wood which were hung up about the decks. After Silas Sheather's death the land occupied by the Camellia Grove Nursery was incorporated into a new suburb with the name Camellia in honor of his nursery.

Camellia japonica 'Prince Frederick William' was first listed in Sheather's Camellia Grove catalogue of 1872, where it was described as "most delicate shade of pink, perfectly imbricated form". The origin of this cultivar is not known for certain. Although it was referred to as Sheather's 'Prince Frederick William', Sheather never listed it as one of his own raising.

Camellia japonica 'Prince Frederick William' was listed a number of times in Europe from 1865 on, but this was an orthographic error for a completely different cultivar: C. japonica 'Princess Frederick William'. The name 'Early Prince' was given for a supposedly early blooming form, but the difference is insufficient to warrant a separate name and it is thus considered a synonym. Other variations of the name exist due to orthographic errors, variations and abbreviations: 'Prince Frederick Wilhelm', 'Prince Frederick Williams', 'Prince Frederic William', 'Prince F. William'.

As well as 'Prince Frederick William', Silas Sheather also developed the cultivar Camellia japonica 'Harriet Beecher Sheather' (1872), named after his daughter. Both of these cultivars are still commercially available. Other camellia cultivars developed by Sheather were 'Astarte', 'Minnie Warren', 'Mrs. Dellissa', 'Sheatheri' and 'St. George'.

'Prince Frederick William' received a Royal Horticultural Society Award of Merit in 1953. This award is given to plants deemed 'of great merit for exhibition'.

Camellia japonica 'Lady Hope' is a sport of 'Prince Frederick William'.

== Cultivation ==
Camellia japonica and its cultivars prefer slightly acidic soils pH 6–7 and are suitable for growing in hardiness zones 6–9. In their native habitat, camellias are understorey plants, and in temperate climates (e.g. Sydney), this cultivar requires semi-shade and no direct sun before 12 noon on a winter's day when flowering, as the lighter colored blooms can suffer from dew burn on the blossoms from being exposed to direct morning sunlight.

When mature, 'Prince Frederick William' is prone to "balling", where too many buds form on the one stem resulting in either small, poorly formed blooms, or the buds turn brown and spoil the look of the plant. These excess blooms take much energy out of the plant and can weaken the plant. The solution is to manually disbud the excess flowers by twisting the excess buds off so that only one bud per stem remains. This will help to develop well-formed flowers and a stronger, healthier plant.

It is claimed that a teaspoon of Epsom salts in five litres of water spread around the bush is beneficial in preventing "balling".

== See also ==
- Camellia japonica 'The Czar'
