= Great Orme =

Headland and country park in Llandudno, north Wales

- Pen y Gogarth
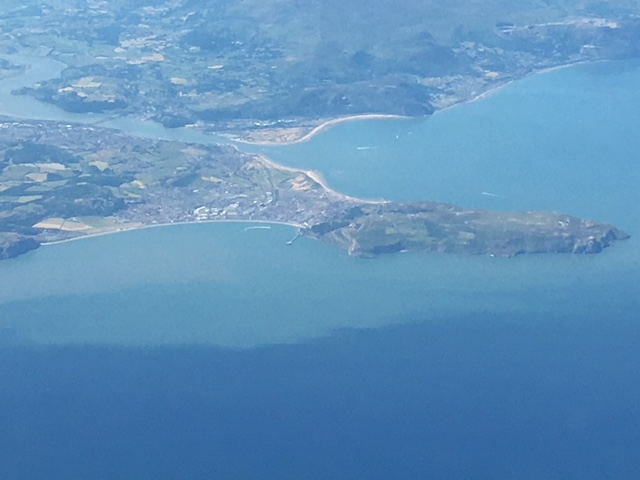
- Great Orme and Llandudno

Highest point
- Elevation: 207 m (679 ft)
- Prominence: 201 m (659 ft)
- Parent peak: Mwdwl-eithin
- Listing: Marilyn
- Coordinates: 53°20′0″N 3°51′20″W

Geography
- Location within Wales
- Location: Conwy county borough, Wales
- OS grid: SH767833
- Topo map: OS Landranger 115

The Great Orme (Welsh: Y Gogarth) is a limestone headland on the north coast of Wales, north-west of the town of Llandudno. Referred to as Cyngreawdr Fynydd by the 12th-century poet Gwalchmai ap Meilyr, its English name derives from the Old Norse word for snake. The Little Orme, a smaller but very similar limestone headland, is on the eastern side of Llandudno Bay. The headland is a tourist attraction, with a Victorian tramway, a cableway, walking routes and a mining museum.

== Toponym ==
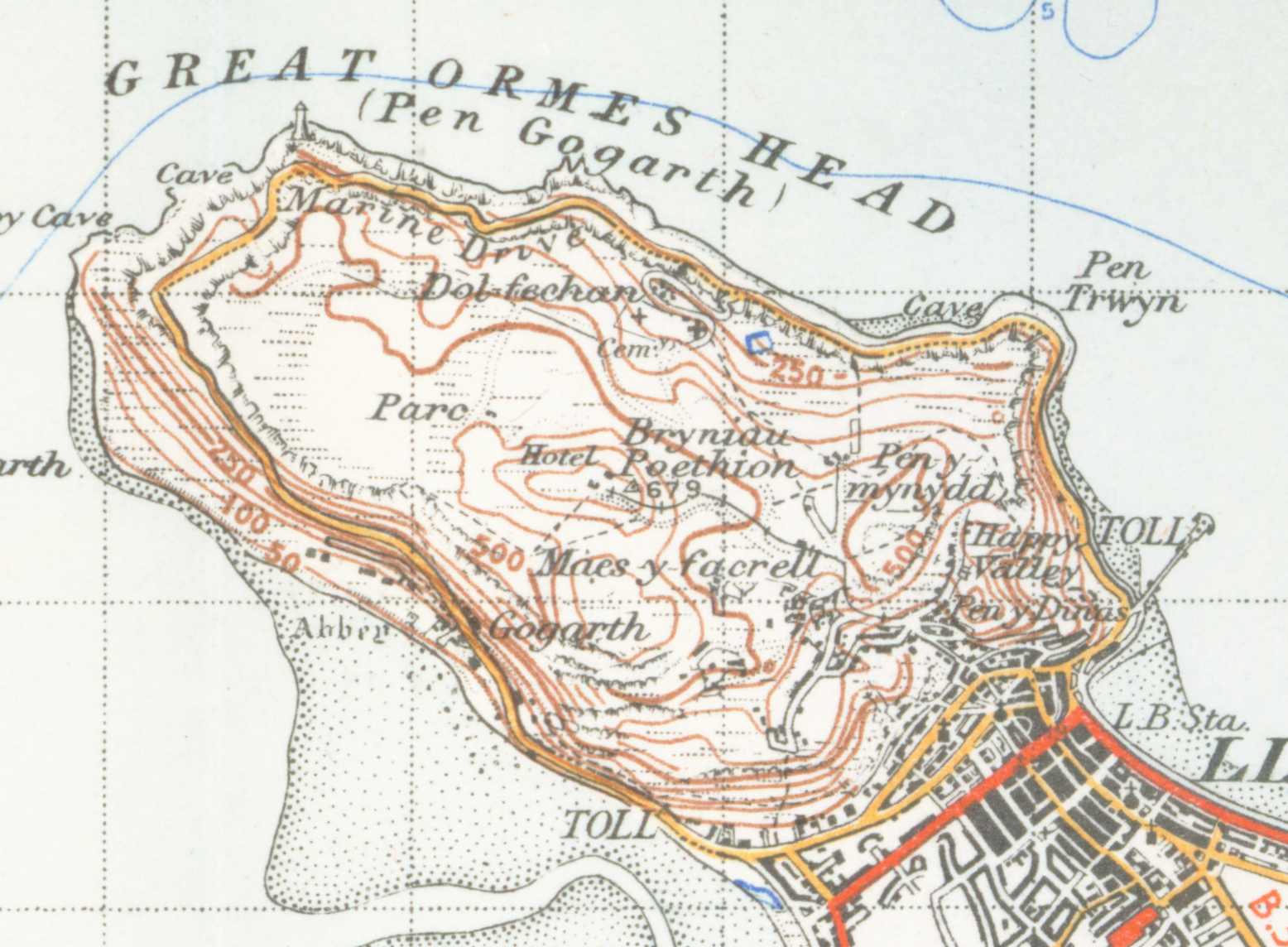
Map of the Great Orme, 1947

Both the Great and Little Ormes have been etymologically linked to the Old Norse word orm, meaning snake or serpent (English worm is a cognate). One explanation is that the Great Orme is the head, with its body being the land between the Great and Little Ormes, whilst another, possibly more likely, is that the shape of the Great Orme viewed as one enters the isthmus of Llandudno from the southeast landward end resembles a giant sleeping creature. The Vikings left no written texts of their time in North Wales although they certainly raided the area. They did not found any permanent settlements, unlike on the Wirral Peninsula, but some Norse names remain in use in the former Kingdom of Gwynedd (such as Point of Ayr near Talacre).

Despite there being a theory for the origin of the name "Orme", the word was not commonly used until after the creation of the Victorian resort of Llandudno in the mid-19th century. Before this, Welsh names were predominantly used locally and in cartography to name the headland's landward features and the surrounding area. The entire peninsula on which Llandudno was built was known as the Creuddyn (the medieval name of the cwmwd – a historical division of land in Wales); the headland itself was called Y Gogarth or Pen y Gogarth; its promontories were Pen trwyn, Llech, and Trwyn y Gogarth.

Orme only appears to have been applied to the headland as seen from the sea. In 1748, the Plan of the Bay & Harbour of Conway in Caernarvon Shire by Lewis Morris names the body of the peninsula "CREUDDYN" but applies the name "Orme's Head" to the headland's north-westerly seaward point. The first series Ordnance Survey map (published in 1841 and before the establishment of Llandudno) follows this convention. The headland is called the "Great Orme's Head" but its landward features all have Welsh names. It is likely that Orme became established as its common name due to Llandudno's burgeoning tourist trade because a majority of visitors and holidaymakers arrived by sea. The headland was the first sight of their destination in the three-hour journey from Liverpool by paddle steamer.

== Natural history ==
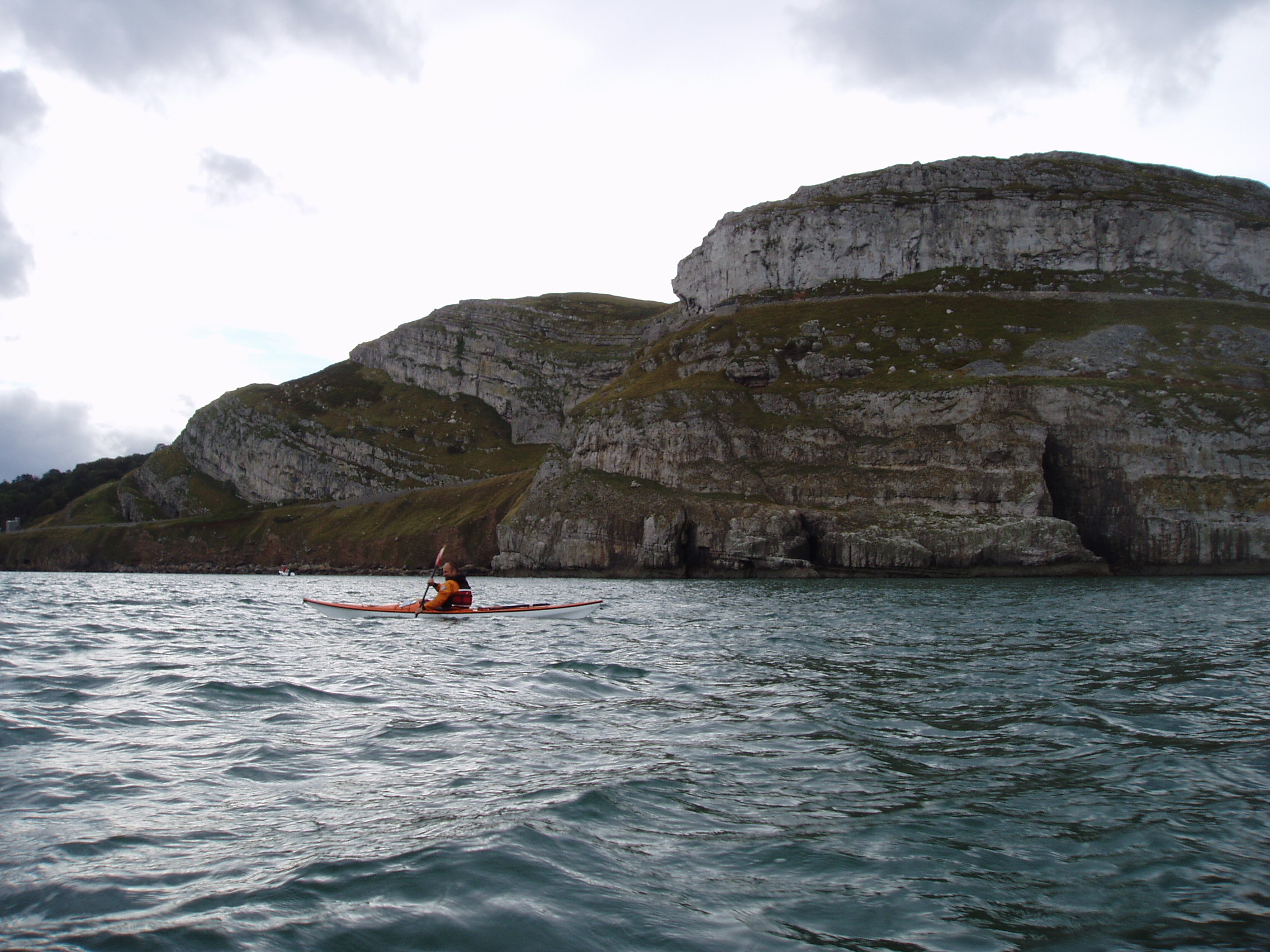
The limestone and dolomite cliffs of the Great Orme

Parts of the Great Orme are managed as a nature reserve by the Conwy County Borough Countryside Service. The area, which is two miles (three kilometres) long by 1 mile (1.5 kilometres) wide, has a number of protective designations including Special Area of Conservation, Heritage Coast, Country Park, and Site of Special Scientific Interest. The local authority provides a warden service on the Great Orme that regularly patrols the special scientific and conservation areas. There are numerous maintained paths for walking to the summit; a section of the long-distance North Wales Path also crosses the headland. About half the Great Orme is in use as farmland, mostly for sheep grazing. In 2015, the National Trust purchased the summit's 140-acre (57-hectare) Parc Farm for £1million.

=== Geology ===
The Great Orme is a peninsula made mostly of limestone and dolomite, formed during the Early Carboniferous part of the Earth's geological history. Most of the Great Orme's rocks are between 339 and 326 million years old. The upper surface of the Great Orme is particularly noted for its limestone pavements covering several headland areas. There are also rich seams of dolomite-hosted copper ore. The Great Orme copper mine was estimated to have produced enough copper to make about 2,000 tons of bronze during the Bronze Age. The slopes of the Great Orme are subject to occasional subsidence.

=== Wells ===
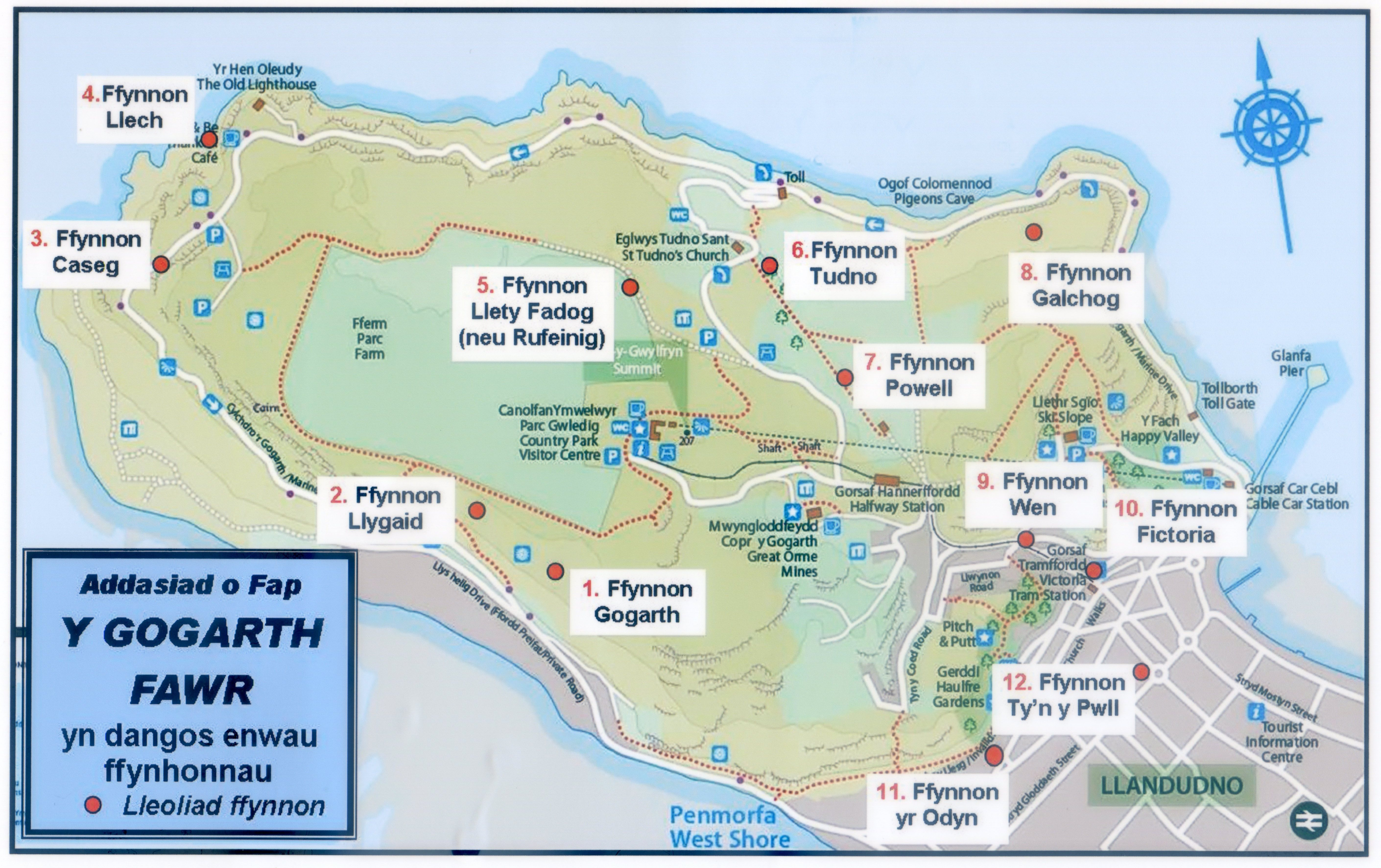
Location of wells on the Great Orme

Natural wells were greatly prized in limestone districts and the Great Orme was no exception. Water was required for copper mining purposes as well as for domestic and agricultural use. The following Great Orme wells are known and most still supply running water:

- Ffynnon Llygaid. Possibly one of the wells supplying the needs of the once populous Gogarth community before much of it was lost to coastal erosion.
- Ffynnon Gogarth. The main water source for Gogarth and in the later 18th and early 19th centuries the power source to operate the famous Tom and Gerry engine that through a long series of Brammock rods powered the mine water pumps at the Higher shaft near the summit above Pyllau.
- Ffynnon Powel. One of the water supplies together with ffynnon Tudno and ffynnon Rufeining serving the medieval farming community of Cyngreawdr.
- Ffynnon Galchog. This well, near Mynydd Isaf, to the north of Pen Dinas, is a source of lime-rich water known for its petrifying qualities, it is one of two wells known to have been used in the washing of copper ores.
- Ffynnon Tudno. Situated beyond the road, near the northeast corner of St Tudno's Church, ffynnon Tudno was, together with ffynnon Rufeining, a principal source of water for the community settled around the church.
- Ffynnon Rufeinig. Translated as "Roman Well", it takes its name from the tradition that Roman copper miners used its waters to wash the copper ores mined nearby.
- Ffynnon Llech. A spring of water in Ogof Llech, a cave on the headland which is very difficult to access. It is claimed to have been used as a hermitage by Saint Tudno, a sixth-century monk of Bangor-is-y-Coed who established the first church here.
- Ffynnon Gaseg. Literally "Mare's well", this spring was revealed at the side of the road, about halfway round and near the highest point, during the construction of the Marine Drive in the 19th century. It was ideally situated to refresh the horses on the five-mile carriage drive round the base of the Great Orme.

=== Flora ===
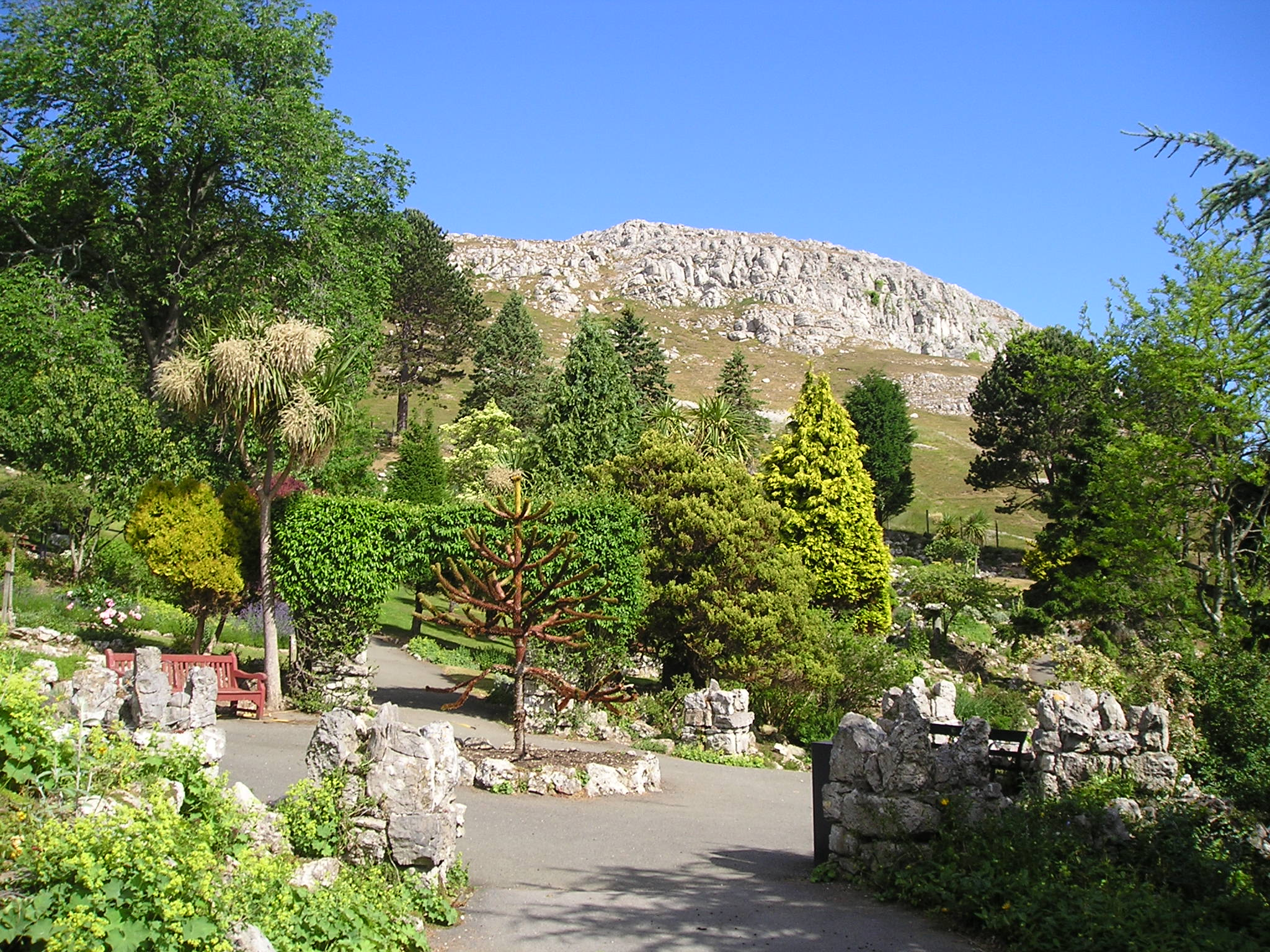
Landscaped gardens in Happy Valley

The Great Orme has a very rich flora, including most notably the only known site of the critically endangered wild cotoneaster (Cotoneaster cambricus), of which only six wild plants are known. Many of the flowers growing in shallow lime-rich earth on the headland have developed from the alpine sub-Arctic species that developed following the last ice-age. Spring and early summer flowers include bloody cranesbill, thrift and sea campion, clinging to the sheer rock face, while pyramidal orchid, common rockrose and wild thyme carpet the grassland. The old mines and quarries also provide suitable habitat for species of plants including spring squill growing on the old copper workings. The white horehound (Marrubium vulgare), which is found growing on the westernmost slopes of the Orme is said to have been used, and perhaps cultivated, by 14th-century monks, no doubt to make herbal remedies including cough mixtures. The rare horehound plume moth (Wheeleria spilodactylus) lays her eggs amongst the silky leaves and its caterpillars rely for food solely upon this one plant.

=== Fauna ===
The headland is the habitat of several endangered species of butterflies and moths, including the silky wave, the silver-studded blue (Plebejus argus subsp. caernesis) and the grayling (Hipparchia semele thyone) These last two have adapted to the Great Orme by appearing earlier in the year to take advantage of the limestone flowers and grasses. Also they are smaller than in other parts of the country and are recognised as a definite subspecies. The Great Orme is reported as the northernmost known habitat within Britain for several 'southern' species of spider notably: Segestria bavarica, Episinus truncatus, Micrargus laudatus, Drassyllus praeficus, Liocranum rupicola and Ozyptila scabricula.

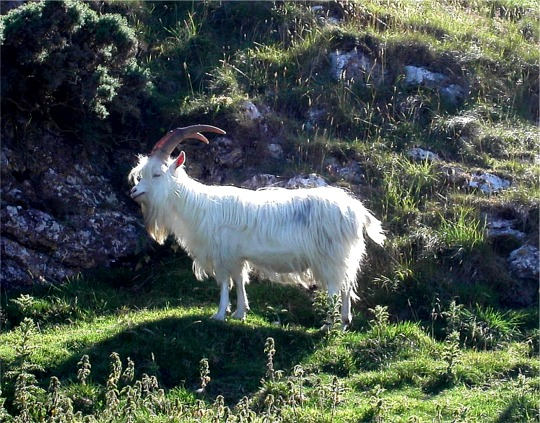
A Kashmiri goat grazing on the Great Orme

The headland is also home to about 200 Kashmir goats. The herd, which has roamed the Orme since the middle of the 19th century, is descended from a pair of goats that were presented by the Shah of Persia to Queen Victoria shortly after her coronation in 1837. Numbers are controlled by compulsory sterilization; the action was taken because competition for resources was forcing goats off the Orme into gardens and property. The Royal Welsh, a large regiment in the British Army, is permitted by the British monarch to choose an animal from the herd to be a regimental goat (if it passes selection, it is given the honorary rank of lance corporal). During the COVID-19 pandemic restrictions in Wales, goats began entering the town because of the lack of people; at the same time, the goat population on the Orme grew rapidly because park wardens were unable to administer sterilisation injections. With the end of the pandemic, the town council has created a special task force to manage goat numbers.

The caves and abandoned mine workings are home to large colonies of the rare horseshoe bat. This small flying mammal navigates the caves and tunnels by using echolocation to obtain a mental picture of its surroundings. During the daytime, horseshoe bats are found suspended from the roof of tunnels and caves, with their wings tightly wrapped around their bodies. Only at dusk do the bats leave the caves and mine shafts, to feed on beetles and moths.

The cliffs are host to colonies of seabirds (such as guillemots, kittiwakes, razorbills and even fulmars as well as gulls). The Great Orme is also home to many resident and migrant land birds including ravens, little owls and peregrine falcons. The red-billed chough is occasionally spotted.

Below the cliffs, the rock-pools around the headland are a rich and varied habitat for aquatic plants and animals including barnacles, red beadlet anemones and hermit crabs.

== History ==
=== Copper mines ===
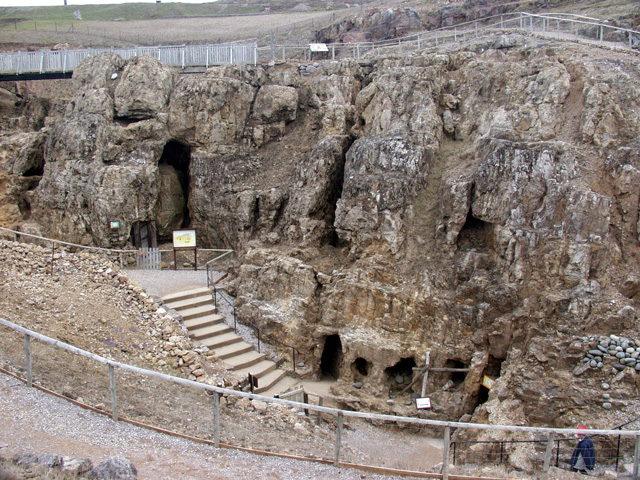
The entrance to the Bronze Age Copper Mine complex on the Great Orme

Large-scale human activity on the Great Orme began around 4,000 years ago during the Bronze Age with the opening of several copper mines. The copper ore malachite was mined using stones and bone tools. It is estimated that up to 1,760 tonnes of copper was mined during the period. The mine was most productive in the period between 1700BC and 1400BC, after which most of the readily accessible copper had been extracted. The site was so productive that by 1600BC, there were no other copper mines left open in Britain because they could not compete with the Great Orme.

The mine was abandoned and evidence suggests it was not worked again until the late 17th century, due to the demand for copper and improved ability to pump water out of the mine. A steam engine was introduced in 1832 and ten years later an 822-metre long tunnel was mined at sea level to drain the deeper mine workings. Commercial-scale mining on the Great Orme ended in the 1850s, although small-scale mining continued until the mines were finally abandoned in 1881.

In 1987, the improvement of the derelict mine site was commissioned by the local council and Welsh Development Agency. The area was to be landscaped and turned into a car park. Since excavation began in 1987, over five miles (eight kilometres) of prehistoric tunnels have been discovered. It is estimated that less than half of the prehistoric tunnels have been discovered so far.

In April 1991 the Great Orme Mines site was opened to the public. Pathways and viewing platforms were constructed to give access to the surface excavations. In 1996 a bridge was erected over the top of Vivian's Shaft. The visitor centre's extension, built-in 2014, contains a selection of mining tools and bronze axes along with displays about life and death in the Bronze Age, mining and ancient metallurgy. Also accessible is the 3,500-year-old Great Cavern.

=== Medieval period ===
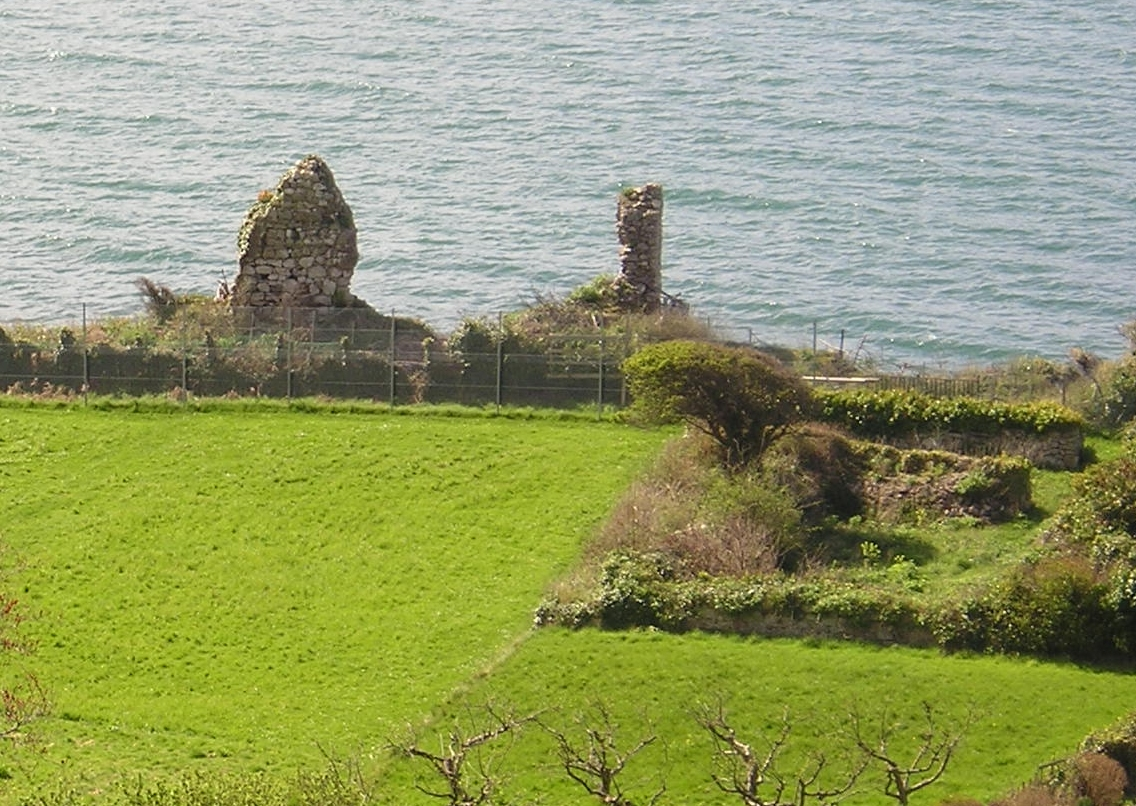
Remains of the 13th-century palace at Gogarth belonging to the Bishops of Bangor (at 53°19′41.72″N 3°51′44.58″W)

The medieval parish of Llandudno comprised three townships all established on the lower slopes of the Great Orme. The township of Y Gogarth at the south-western 'corner' of the Great Orme was latterly the smallest but it contained the palace of the Bishop of Bangor. The Manor of Gogarth (which included all three townships) had been bestowed on Anian, Bishop of Bangor by King Edward I in 1284 in recognition of services rendered to the crown, notably the baptism of the first English Prince of Wales, newly born at Caernarfon. The palace was burnt down by Owain Glyndŵr in 1400 and the ruins have mostly been washed away together with much of the township by coastal erosion in the Conwy Estuary.

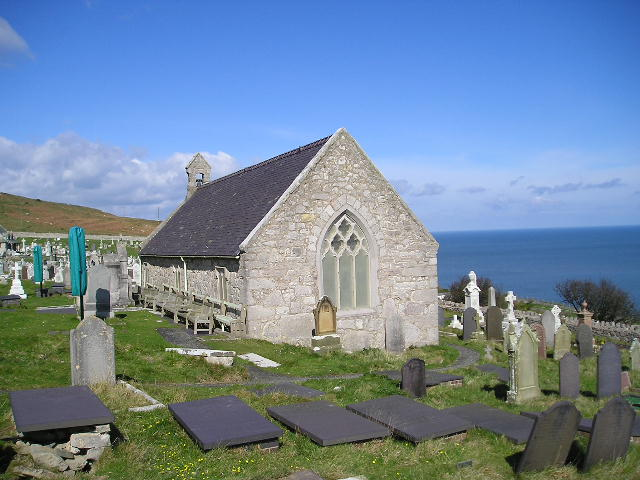
Saint Tudno's is Llandudno's original parish church.

The significant agricultural yet north-facing township of Cyngreawdr includes the original parish church and rectory of St Tudno, a sixth- or seventh-century foundation. Following the Glyndŵr uprising, the villagers of the Creuddyn peninsula were harshly taxed and by 1507 they had nearly all fled their homes. Henceforth the cultivated land lay fallow and is now grazed by sheep and goats. Llandudno's Victorian cemetery, which is still in regular use, was laid out in 1859 adjacent to the 12th-century church of Saint Tudno where open-air services are held every Sunday morning in summer. Nearby are several large ancient stones that have become shrouded in folklore and also an unexplained stone-lined avenue called Hwylfa'r Ceirw leading towards Cilfin Ceirw (Precipice of Deer).

The third township was Yn Wyddfid clustered below the Iron Age hill fort of Pen y Dinas at the northeastern "corner" of the Great Orme. With the reopening of the copper mines from the 18th century onwards, this township grew considerably in size with the streets and cottages of the mining village laid out on the largely abandoned agricultural holdings.

=== Victorian expansion ===
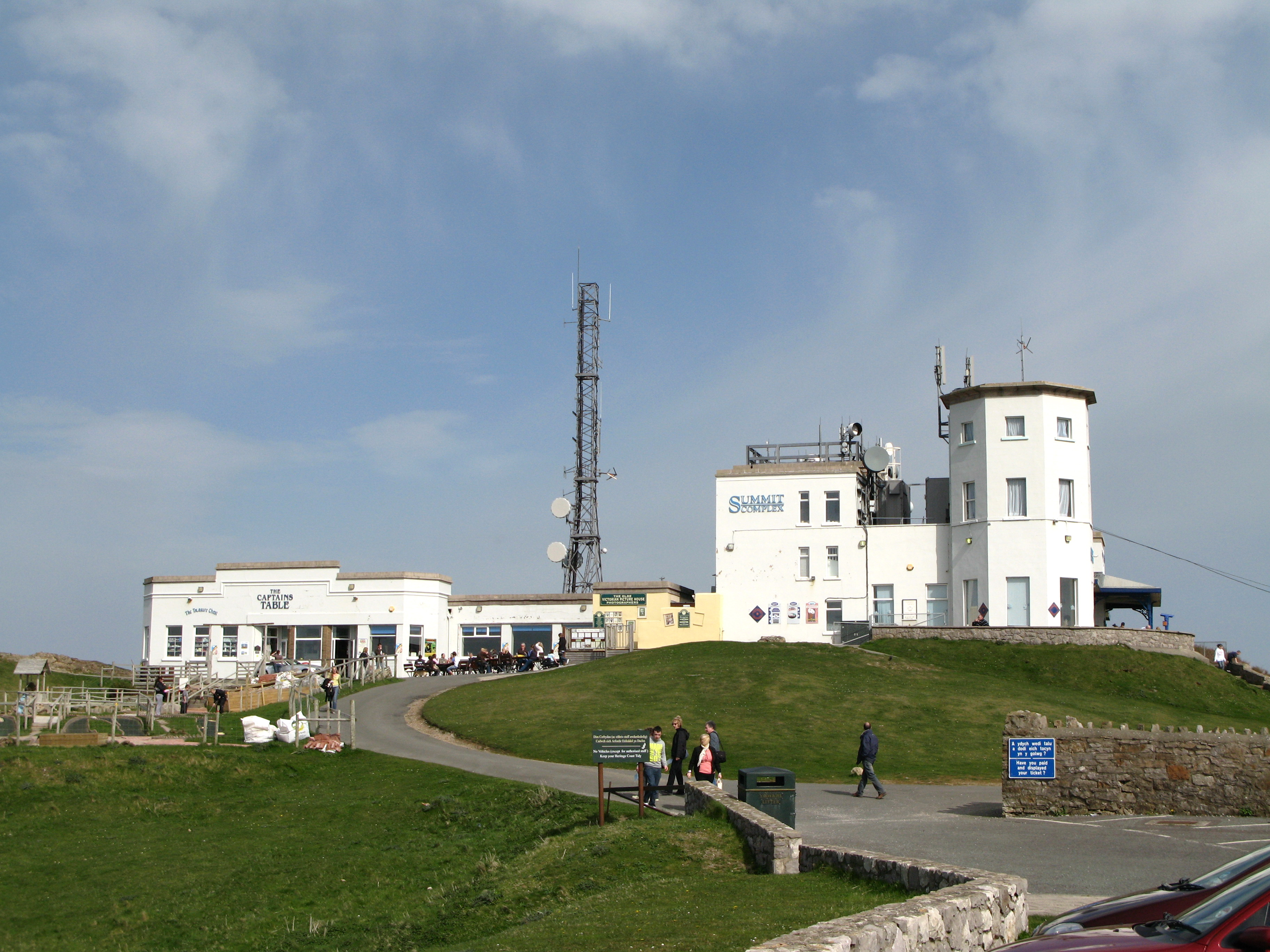
The Great Orme's summit complex

In 1825 the Board of the Port of Liverpool obtained a local act of Parliament, the Liverpool Improvement Act 1825 (6 Geo. 4. c. clxxxvii) to help improve safety and communications for the merchant marine operating in the Irish Sea and Liverpool Bay. The act allowed them to erect and maintain telegraph stations between Liverpool and the Isle of Anglesey. This would help ship-owners, merchants and port authorities in Liverpool know the location of all mercantile shipping along the North Wales coast.

In 1826 the summit of the Great Orme was chosen as the location for one of the 11 optical semaphore stations that would form an unbroken 80 mi (130 km) chain from Liverpool to Holyhead. The original semaphore station on the Orme, which consisted of small building with living accommodation, used a 15 m (49 ft) ship's mast with three pairs of moveable arms to send messages to either Puffin Island 7 mi (11 km) to the west or 8 1/2 mi (14 km) to Llysfaen in the east. Skilled telegraphers could send semaphore messages between Liverpool and Holyhead in under a minute.

In March 1855 the Great Orme telegraph station was converted to electric telegraph. Landlines and submarine cables connected the Orme to Liverpool and Holyhead. At first the new equipment was installed in the original Semaphore Station on the summit until it was moved down to the Great Orme lighthouse in 1862. Two years later the Great Orme semaphore station closed with the completion of a direct electric telegraph connection from Liverpool to Holyhead.

By the late 1860s, Llandudno's blossoming tourist trade saw many Victorians visit the old semaphore station at the summit to enjoy the panorama. This led to the development of the summit complex.

=== Twentieth century ===
By the early 20th century, a nine-bed hotel was built on the site. It served as the clubhouse for the Great Orme Golf Club that was founded in the early 1900s. The course closed in 1939 and is now a sheep farm.

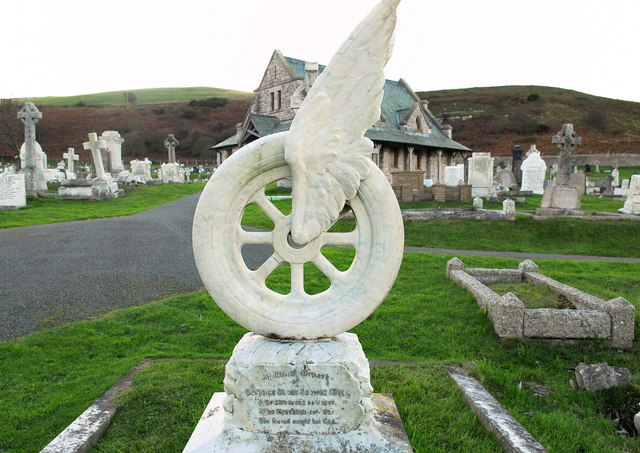
Beatrice Blore Browne's gravestone at Saint Tudno's Church

On 11 July 1914, Beatrice Blore drove a Singer Ten car up the cable track of the Great Orme, with a gradient of 1 in 3 in places, becoming the first woman to drive up the steep and challenging headland. She was six months pregnant at the time and the drive was a publicity stunt developed by her partner George Wilkin Browne to help sell the cars at his Llandudno garage, North Wales Silver Motors. Her feat is commemorated by her unusual gravestone in St Tudno's graveyard.

=== Second World War and beyond ===
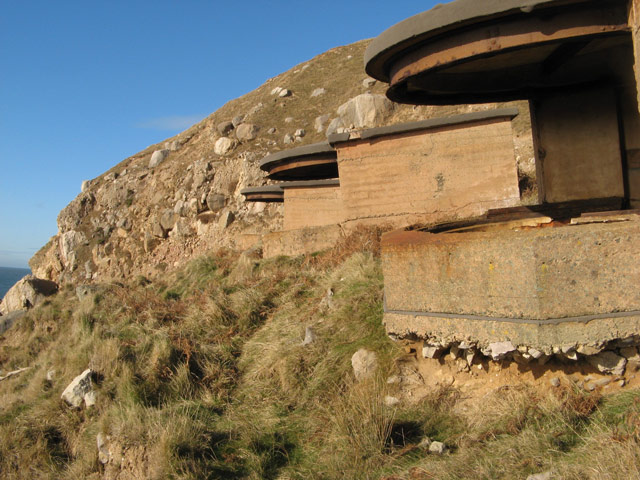
Gun emplacements belonging to the coastal artillery school

During the Second World War, the RAF built a Chain Home Low radar station at the summit.

The Royal Artillery coast artillery school was transferred from Shoeburyness to the Great Orme in 1940 (and, additionally, a Practice Camp was established on the Little Orme in 1941) during the war. Target practice was undertaken from the headland using both towed and anchored boats. Experimental work and training were also provided for radio direction finding. The foundations of some of the buildings and installations remain and can be seen from the western end of Marine Drive. The site of the school was scheduled as an Ancient Monument in 2011 by CADW, the Welsh Government's historic monuments body. This was done in recognition of the site's significance in a UK and Welsh context.

Also of note was the Aerial Defence Research and Development Establishment (ADRDE) known as "X3", which was a three-storey building erected in 1942. This seems to have been a secret radar experimental station above the artillery school. The road put in to serve it now serves a car park on the approximate site of the station, which was demolished in 1956.

In 1952 the site was taken into private ownership, until it was acquired by Llandudno Urban Town Council in 1961.

== Sport ==
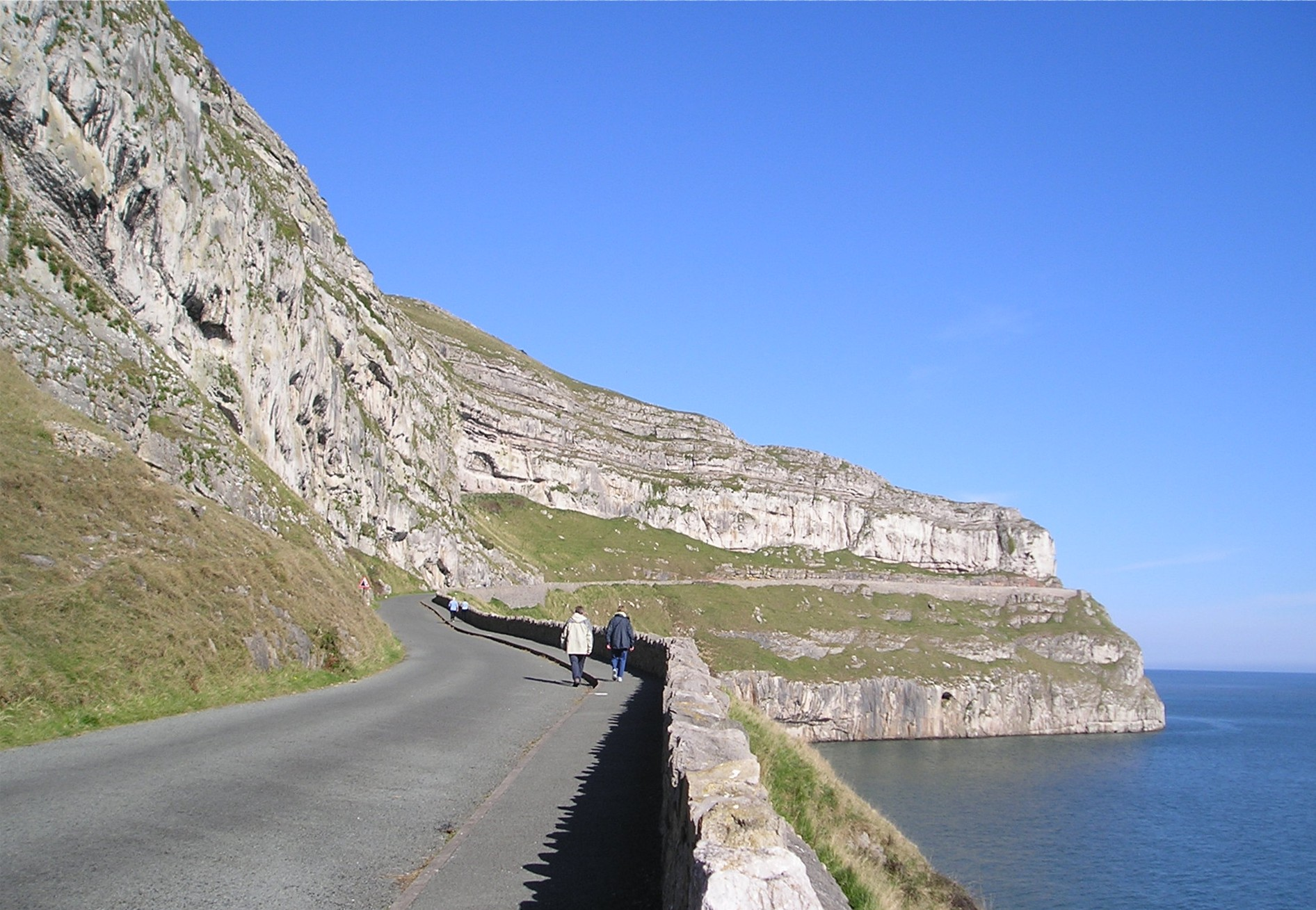
The Marine Drive round the Great Orme opened in 1878.

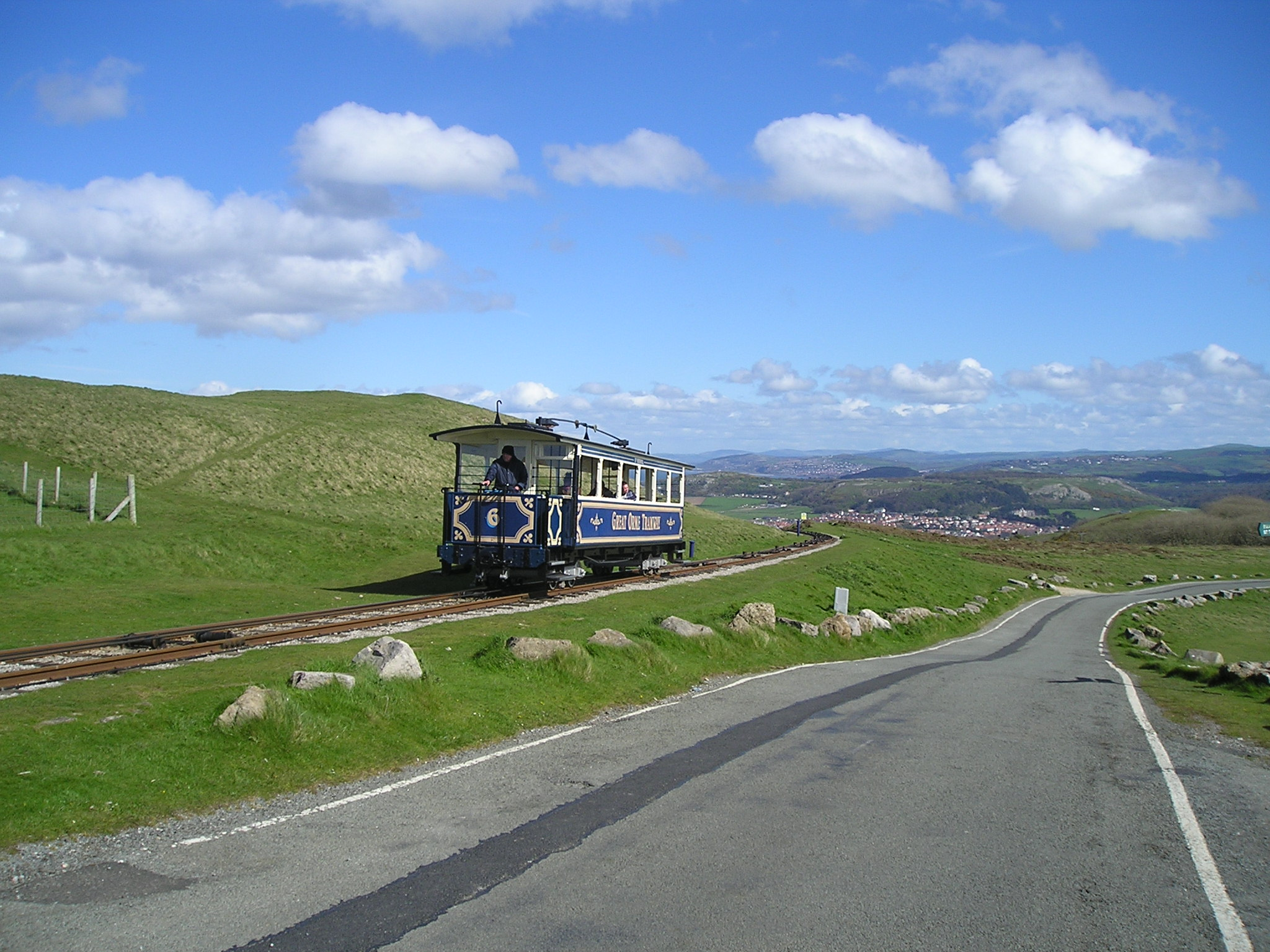
Vintage tram near the summit

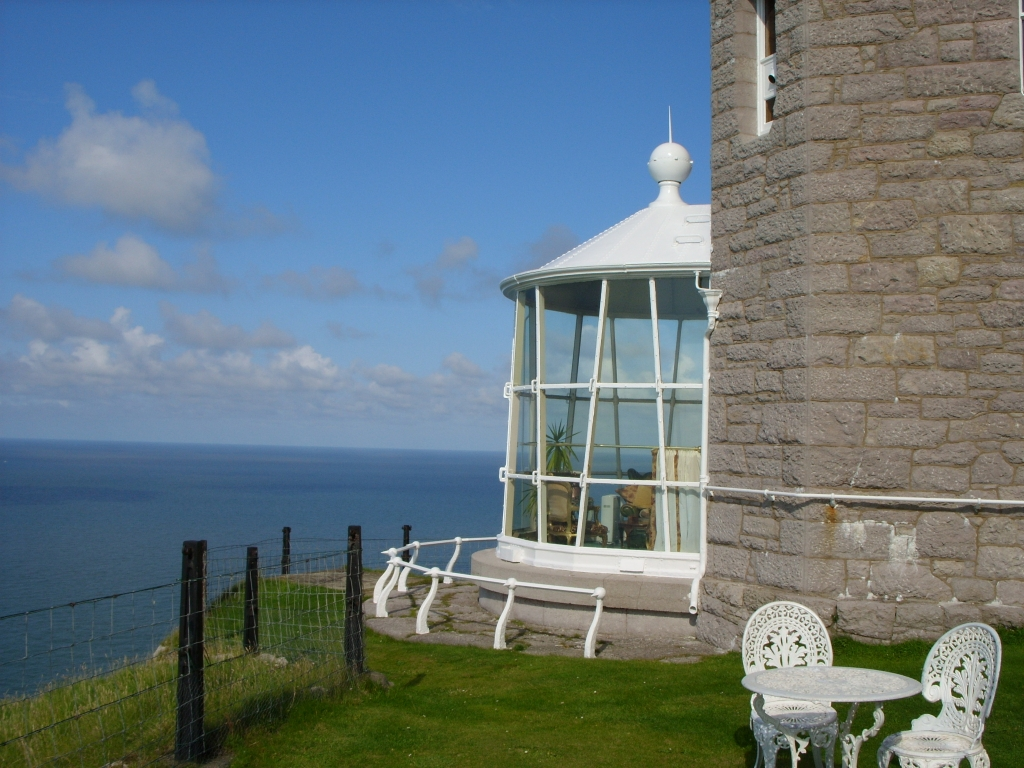
The 180° former optical lamp room at the Llandudno lighthouse bed & breakfast

The third stage of the Tour of Britain Women's cycle race finished at Great Orme in 2026.

== Tourism ==
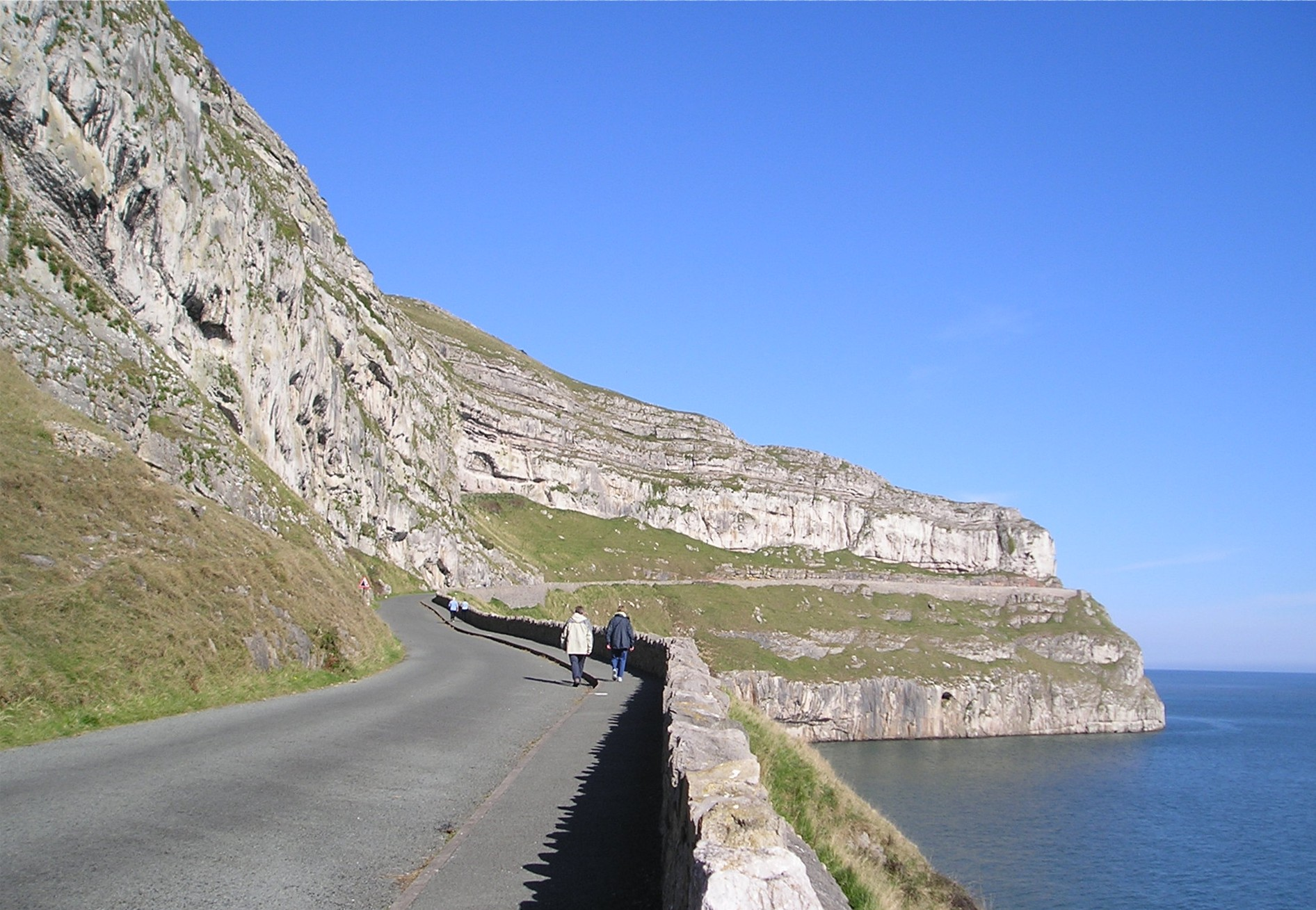
The Marine Drive round the Great Orme opened in 1878.

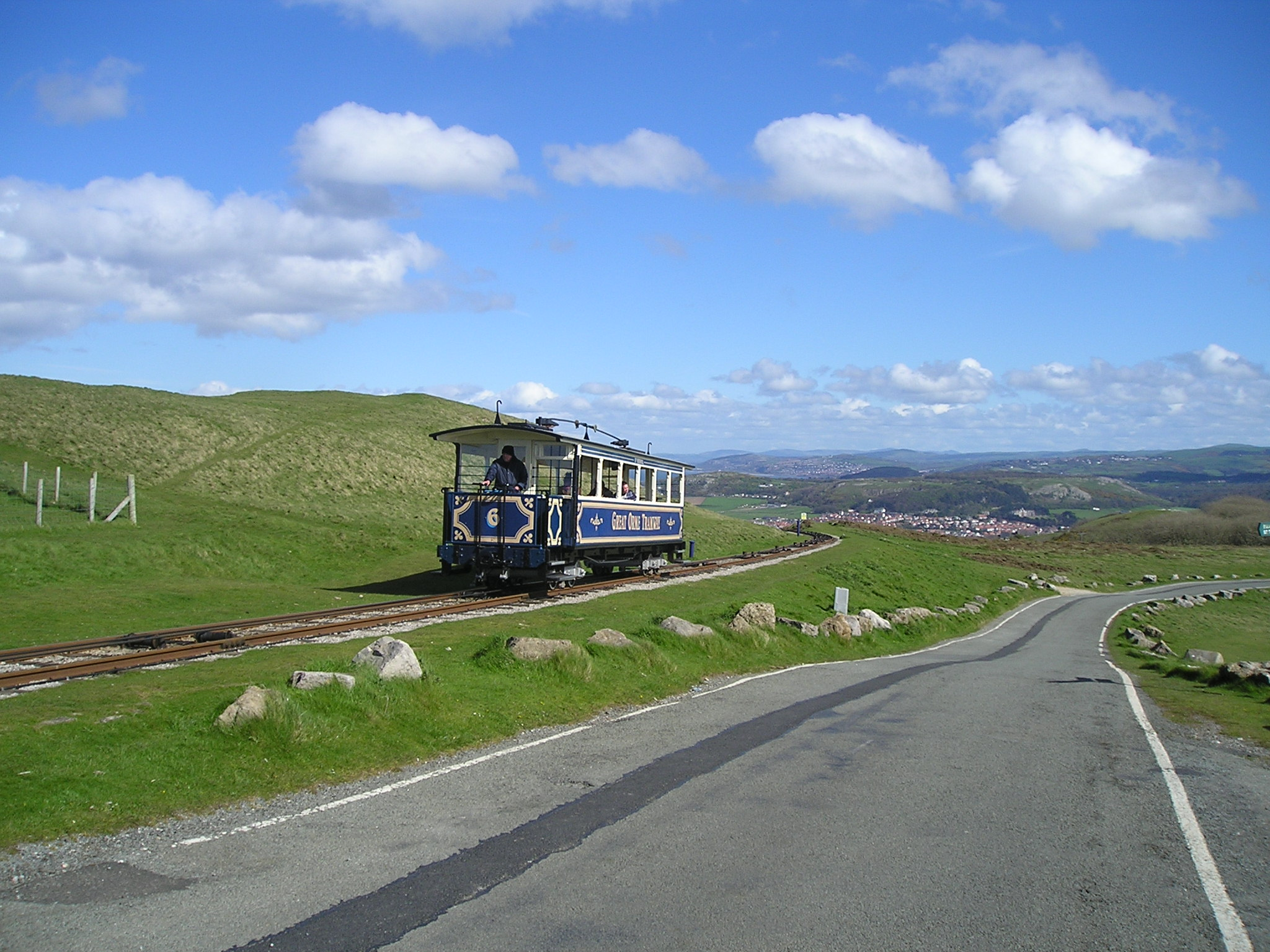
Vintage tram near the summit

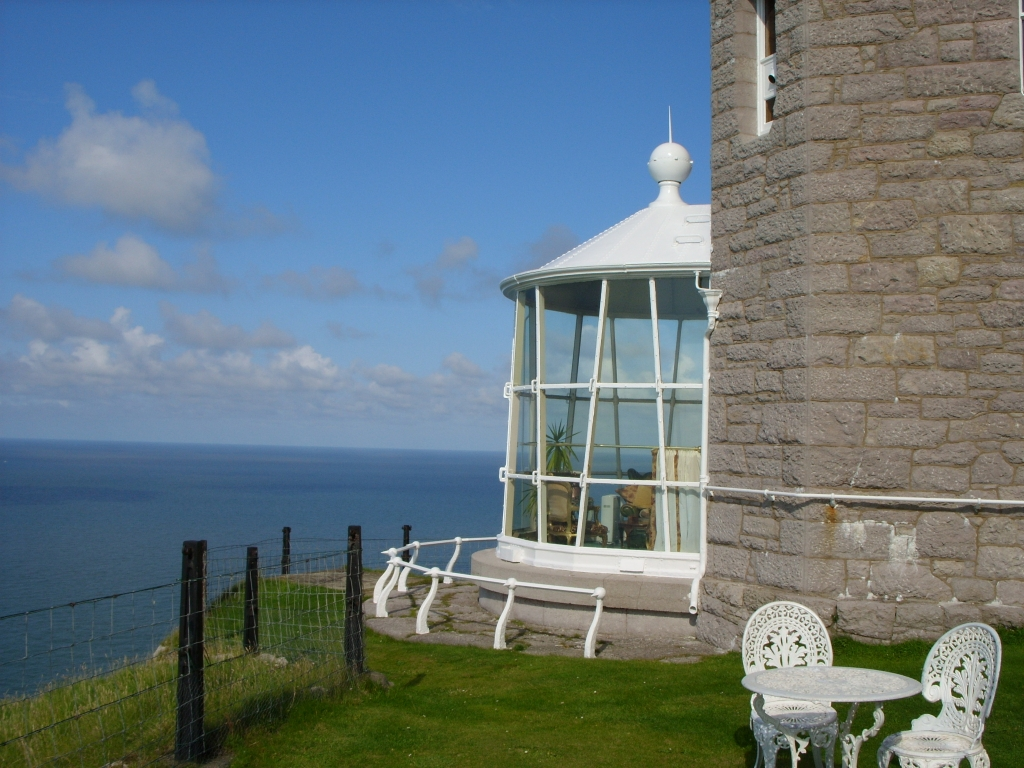
The 180° former optical lamp room at the Llandudno lighthouse bed & breakfast

With the creation of Llandudno, the first route round the perimeter of the Great Orme was a footpath constructed in 1858 by Reginald Cust, a trustee of the Mostyn Estate. In 1872 the Great Ormes Head Marine Drive Co. Ltd. was formed to turn the path into a Victorian carriage road. But it went bankrupt before work was finished. A second company completed the road in 1878. The contractors for the scheme were Messrs Hughes, Morris, Davies, a consortium led by Richard Hughes of Madoc Street, Llandudno. The road was bought by Llandudno Urban District Council in 1897. The four-mile (six-kilometre) one-way toll road starts at the foot of the Happy Valley. After about 1 1/2 miles (2.5 km) a side road leads to St. Tudno's Church, the Bronze Age Copper Mines and to the Great Orme Summit complex with car park. The toll road ticket also pays for the parking at the Summit Complex. Marine Drive has been used as a stage on the Wales Rally GB in 1981, 2011, 2013, 2015 and 2018.

In 1902, the Great Orme Tramway was built to convey visitors to the top of the Great Orme. In 1969, the Llandudno Cable Car was also constructed to take visitors up to the summit attractions. These include a tourist shop, cafeteria, visitors' centre, play areas, a licensed hotel, and the vintage tram/cable-car stations.

On clear days Winter Hill, the Isle of Man and the Lake District can be seen from the summit of the Orme.

The Orme has one of only two artificial ski slopes in North Wales, complete with one of the longest toboggan runs in the United Kingdom.

Landscaped gardens in the Happy Valley and terraces in the Haulfre Garden cover the lower landward facing steeply sloping southern side. Walkways link the Haulfre Gardens with the western end of the Marine Drive.

On the northernmost point of the Orme is the former Llandudno lighthouse. It was constructed in 1862 by the Mersey Docks and Harbour Company. The navigation aid remained in continuous use until 22 March 1985 when it was decommissioned. The building has now been converted into a small bed & breakfast guest house. The lantern and its optics are now on permanent display at the Summit Complex visitors' centre. The old established "Rest and be thankful" café is also nearby.

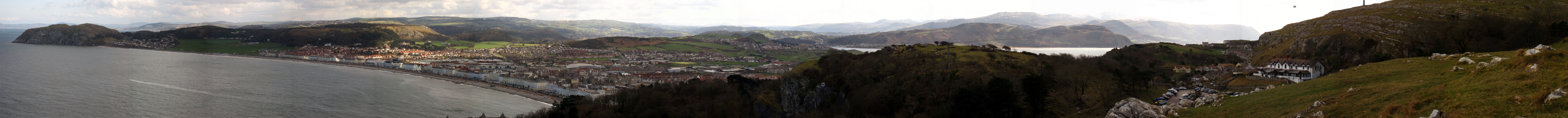
View across Llandudno Bay towards the Little Orme and across the Conwy estuary towards Tal y Fan

== Bibliography ==
- Aris, Mary (1996). Historic Landscapes of the Great Orme. Carreg Gwalch, Llanrwst Wales. ISBN 0-86381-357-7.
- Evans, Philip C. (2011). Llandudno Coast Artillery School. Llandudno Town Council.
- Roberts, Jim (1992). Llandudno Past & Present. Sutton Publishing Ltd, Stroud, Gloucestershire. ISBN 0-7509-2903-0.
- Saxon (1578). Map of Anglesey and Caernarvonshire. Great Orme peninsula labelled as "Ormeshead Point".
- Wynne Jones, Ivor (2002). Llandudno Queen of Welsh Resorts. Landmark, Ashbourne Derbyshire. ISBN 1-84306-048-5.
- Jowett, Nick (2016). Great Orme Bronze Age Mines. Great Orme Mines Ltd, Great Orme, Llandudno, Wales.
