= Lewis Carroll: A Biography =

1995 book by Morton N. Cohen

- The cover of the Knopf edition
- Author: Morton N. Cohen
- Language: English
- Publisher: Knopf
- Publication date: 1995
- Media type: Print (hardcover)
- Pages: 557
- ISBN: 978-0-679-74562-4

Lewis Carroll: A Biography is a 1995 biography of author Lewis Carroll by Morton N. Cohen, first published by Knopf, later by Macmillan. It is generally considered to be the definitive scholarly work on Carroll's (real name Charles Lutwidge Dodgson) life. Cohen's approach is mainly chronological, with some chapters grouped by theme, such as those on Carroll's religion, his love of little girls, and his guilty feelings. Cohen, a Carroll scholar for 30 years, opts to use Dodgson's first name, Charles, throughout the work, because it "seems most appropriate in a book dealing with the intimacy of his life".

The book generally assumes that Carroll's love of little girls was not just emotional but sexual—that he was a paedophile, albeit a suppressed one. In the book Cohen writes:

"We cannot know to what extent sexual urges lay behind Charles's preference for drawing and photographing children in the nude. He contended that the preference was entirely aesthetic. But given his emotional attachment to children as well as his aesthetic appreciation of their forms, his assertion that his interest was strictly artistic is naïve. He probably felt more than he dared acknowledge, even to himself."

While attributing the source of Carroll's chaotic emotional life to his sexual urges, Cohen opined that they were also responsible for his creative works.

Karoline Leach in In the Shadow of the Dreamchild (1999) writes that Cohen and previous biographers misunderstood the norms and customs of the Victorian era, and that Carroll's adulation of children was not sexual but a reflection of the romanticisation of the child prevalent in that era. Contrariwise, a website set up by opponents (including Leach) of the traditional Carroll image, reports that while Cohen acknowledges the paedophilic nature of Carroll's image, he "Inexplicably he lists the numbers of intimate woman-friends that Dodgson had through his life, yet still concludes that his existence revolved exclusively around friendships with small girls!"

Jo Elwyn Jones and J. Francis Gladstone in The Alice Companion: A Guide to Lewis Carroll's Alice Books (1998) criticises the book for what they say is a poor treatment of Carroll's involvement in controversies at the University of Oxford. Megan Harlan in Entertainment Weekly writes that "This beautifully written bio never shies away from the house-of-mirrors complexity of its subject." An issue of Victorian Studies reported that there were issues with inconsistent references. Miles Edward Friend compares Cohen's handling of the material to Carroll's boat trips with the children, saying, "With Cohen at the tiller, we are deftly guided through the flow of Carroll's life." Ronald Warwick in Times Higher Education criticises Cohen's interpretation of Carroll's relationship with his archdeacon father; his "insecure grasp of 19th-century ecclesiastical history"; his prose, which Warwick called clichéd; and his choice to use Dodgson's first name, which Warwick said was not used even by Dodgson's most intimate male friends.

== Sources ==
- Cohen, Morton N. (1995). Lewis Carroll: A Biography. Macmillan. ISBN 0333629264
- Leach, Karoline (1999). In the Shadow of the Dreamchild: A New Understanding of Lewis Carroll. Peter Owen. ISBN 978-0720610444
