= Alice Liddell =

Basis of the character in "Alice in Wonderland"

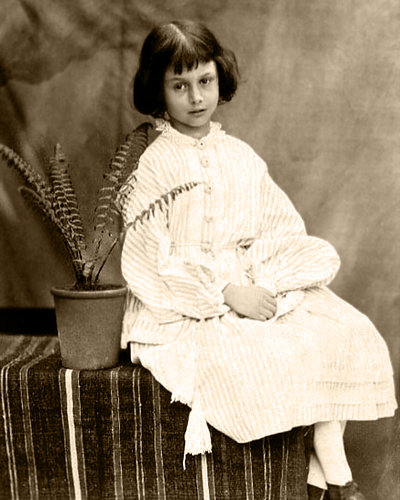
- Liddell, aged 7, photographed by Charles Dodgson (Lewis Carroll) in 1860
- Born: Alice Pleasance Liddell; 4 May 1852; Westminster, Middlesex, England
- Died: 16 November 1934 (aged 82); Westerham, Kent, England
- Other name: Alice Hargreaves
- Spouse: Reginald Hargreaves (m. 1880; died 1926)
- Children: 3
- Parent(s): Henry Liddell; Lorina Reeve

Alice Pleasance Hargreaves (née Liddell, /ˈlɪdəl/; 4 May 1852 – 16 November 1934) was an English woman who, in her childhood, was an acquaintance and photographic subject of Lewis Carroll. One of the stories he told her during a boating trip became the classic 1865 children's novel Alice's Adventures in Wonderland. She shared her name with "Alice", the story's protagonist, but scholars disagree about the extent to which the character was based upon her.

== Early life ==
Alice Liddell was the fourth of the ten children of Henry Liddell, Dean of Christ Church, Oxford, one of the editors of A Greek-English Lexicon, and his wife Lorina Hanna Liddell (née Reeve). She had two older brothers, Harry (born 1847) and Arthur (1850–53), an older sister Lorina (born 1849), and six younger siblings, including her sister Edith (born 1854) to whom she was very close, and her brother Frederick (born 1865).

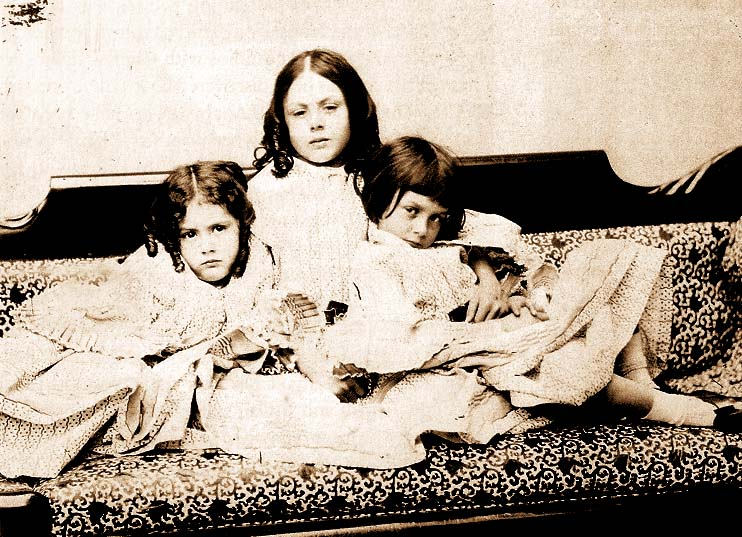
Alice Liddell (right) with sisters c.1859 (photo by Lewis Carroll)

At the time of her birth, her father was the Headmaster of Westminster School, but soon afterwards he was appointed to the deanery of Christ Church, Oxford. The Liddell family moved to Oxford in 1856. Soon after this move, Alice met Charles Lutwidge Dodgson (Lewis Carroll), who encountered the family while photographing the cathedral on 25 April 1856. He became a close friend of the Liddell family in subsequent years.

Alice was three years younger than Lorina and two years older than Edith, and the three sisters were constant childhood companions. She and her family regularly spent holidays at their holiday home, Penmorfa, which later became the Gogarth Abbey Hotel, on the West Shore of Llandudno in North Wales.

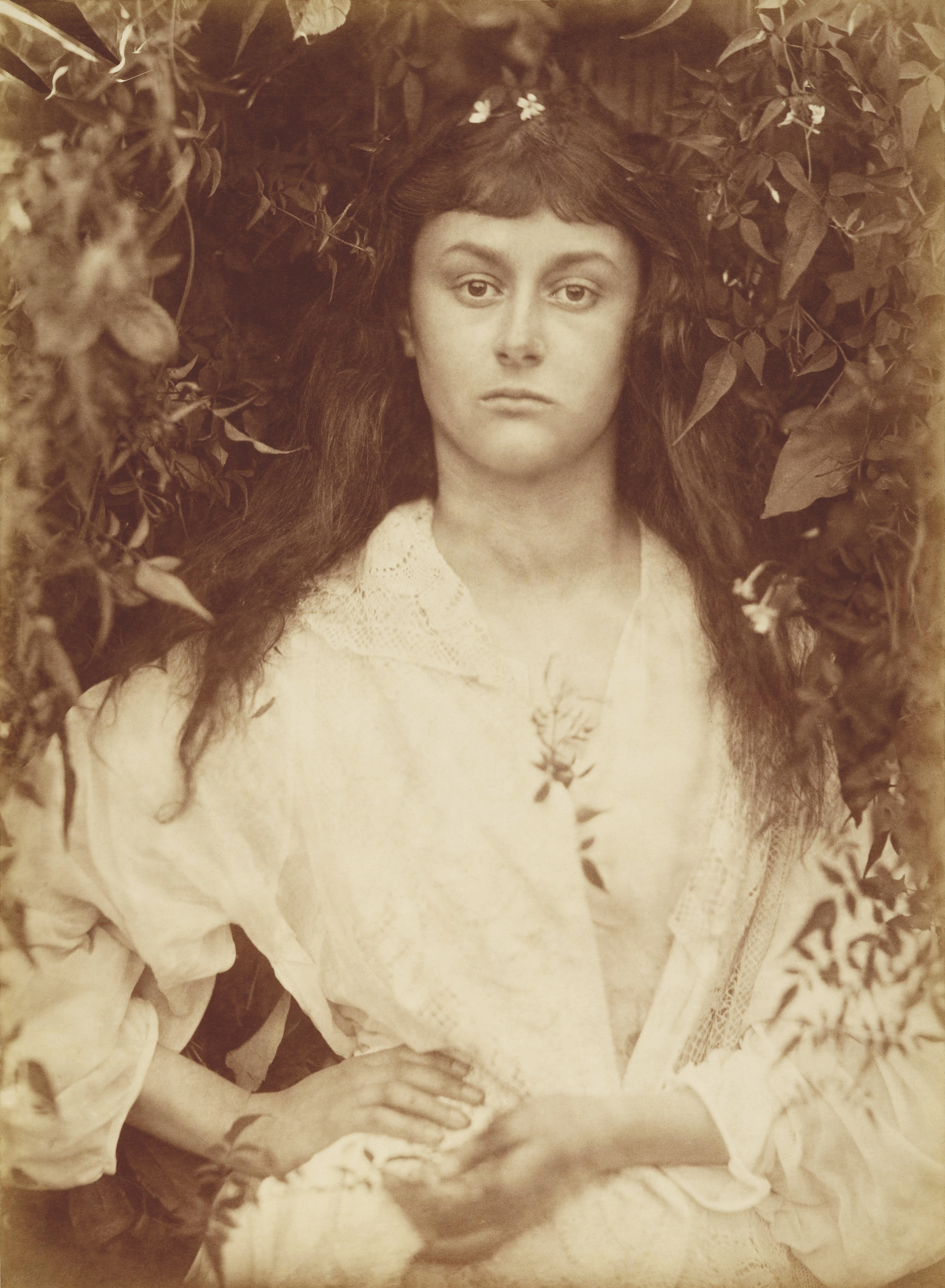
Alice Liddell at the age of 20, photographed by Julia Margaret Cameron

When Alice was a young woman, she set out on a Grand Tour of Europe with Lorina and Edith. One story has it that she became a romantic interest of Prince Leopold, the youngest son of Queen Victoria, during the four years he spent at Christ Church, but the evidence for this is sparse. It is true that years later, Leopold named his first child Alice and acted as godfather to Alice's second son, Leopold. However, it is possible Alice was instead named in honour of Leopold's deceased elder sister, the Grand Duchess of Hesse. A recent biographer of Leopold suggests it is far more likely that Alice's sister Edith was the true recipient of Leopold's attention. Edith died on 26 June 1876, possibly of measles or peritonitis (accounts differ), shortly before she was to be married to Aubrey Harcourt, a cricket player. Prince Leopold served as a pall-bearer at her funeral on 30 June 1876.

== Later life ==
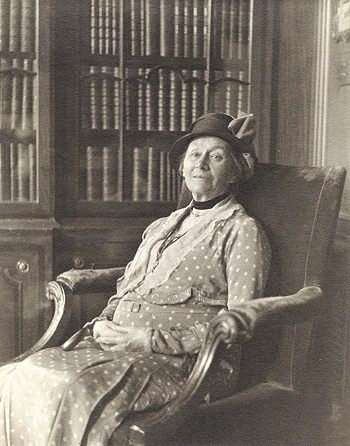
Alice Hargreaves in 1932, at the age of 80

Alice Liddell married Reginald Hargreaves, also a cricketer, on 15 September 1880, at the age of 28, in Westminster Abbey. They had three sons: Alan Knyveton Hargreaves and Leopold Reginald "Rex" Hargreaves (both were killed in action in World War I); and Caryl Liddell Hargreaves, who survived to have a daughter of his own. Liddell denied that the name 'Caryl' was in any way associated with Charles Dodgson's pseudonym. Reginald Hargreaves inherited a considerable fortune and was a local magistrate; he also played cricket for Hampshire. Alice became a noted society hostess and was the first president of Emery Down Women's Institute.

During World War I, she joined the Red Cross as a volunteer, for which she was awarded a medal currently on display in the Museum of Oxford. She took to referring to herself as "Lady Hargreaves", but no basis existed for such a title. For most of her life, Alice lived in and around Lyndhurst in the New Forest, in the county of Hampshire.

With her husband's death in 1926, the cost of maintaining their home, Cuffnells, was such that she deemed it necessary to sell her copy of Alice's Adventures under Ground (Lewis Carroll's earlier title for Alice's Adventures in Wonderland). The manuscript fetched £15,400 (equivalent to £800,000 in 2025), nearly four times the reserve price given to it by Sotheby's auction house. It later became the possession of Eldridge R. Johnson and was displayed at Columbia University on the centennial of Carroll's birth in 1932. Alice was present, aged 80, and it was on this visit to the United States that she met Peter Llewelyn Davies, one of the brothers who inspired J. M. Barrie's Peter Pan. After Johnson's death in 1945, the book was purchased by a consortium of American bibliophiles and presented to the British people "in recognition of Britain's courage in facing Hitler". The manuscript is held by the British Library.

== Death ==
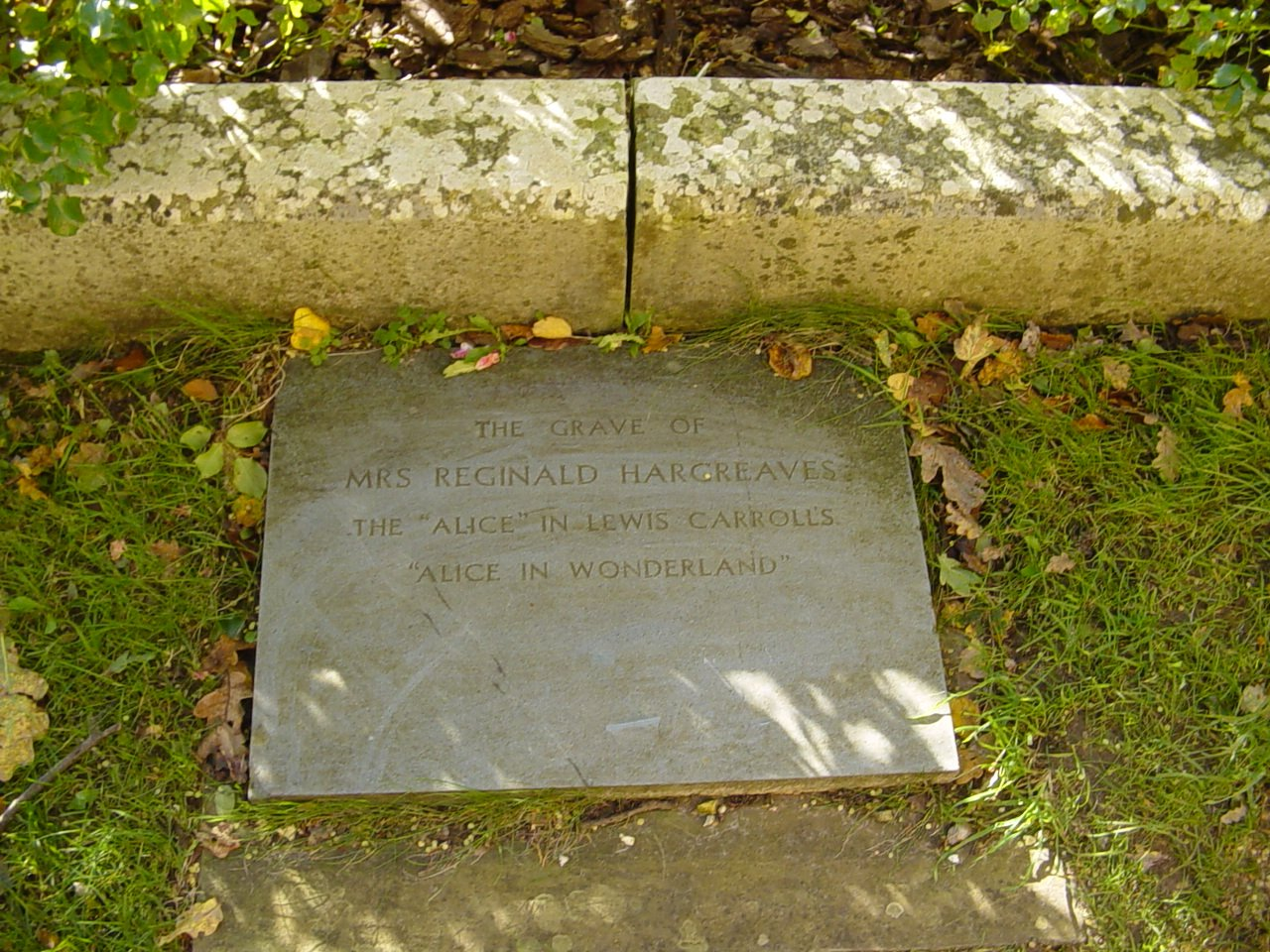
The grave of Alice Hargreaves in the graveyard of the church of St Michael and All Angels, Lyndhurst, Hampshire

After she died in 1934, her body was cremated at Golders Green Crematorium, with her ashes being buried in the graveyard of the church of St Michael and All Angels in Lyndhurst, Hampshire. Alice's mirror can be found on display at the New Forest Heritage Centre, Lyndhurst, a free museum sharing the history of the New Forest National Park.

== Origin of Alice in Wonderland ==
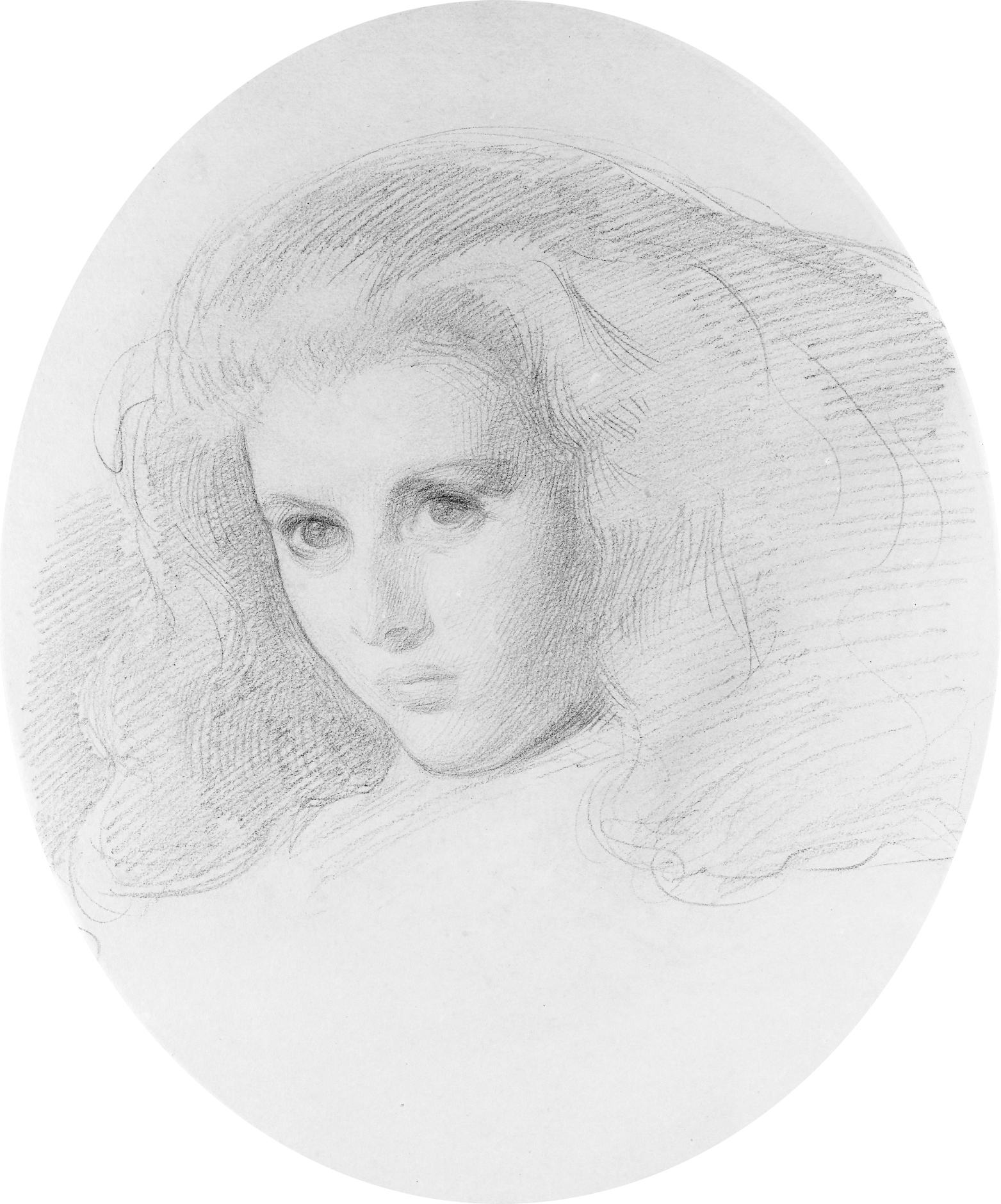
Edith Liddell (William Blake Richmond, c. 1864)

On 4 July 1862, in a rowing boat travelling on the Isis from Folly Bridge, Oxford, to Godstow for a picnic outing, 10-year-old Alice asked Charles Dodgson (who wrote under the pen name Lewis Carroll) to entertain her and her sisters, Edith (aged 8) and Lorina (13), with a story. As the Reverend Robinson Duckworth rowed the boat, Dodgson regaled the girls with fantastic stories of a girl named Alice and her adventures after she fell into a rabbit-hole. The story was not unlike those Dodgson had spun for the sisters before, but this time Liddell asked Dodgson to write it down for her. He promised to do so but did not get around to the task for some months. He eventually presented her with the manuscript of Alice's Adventures Under Ground in November 1864.

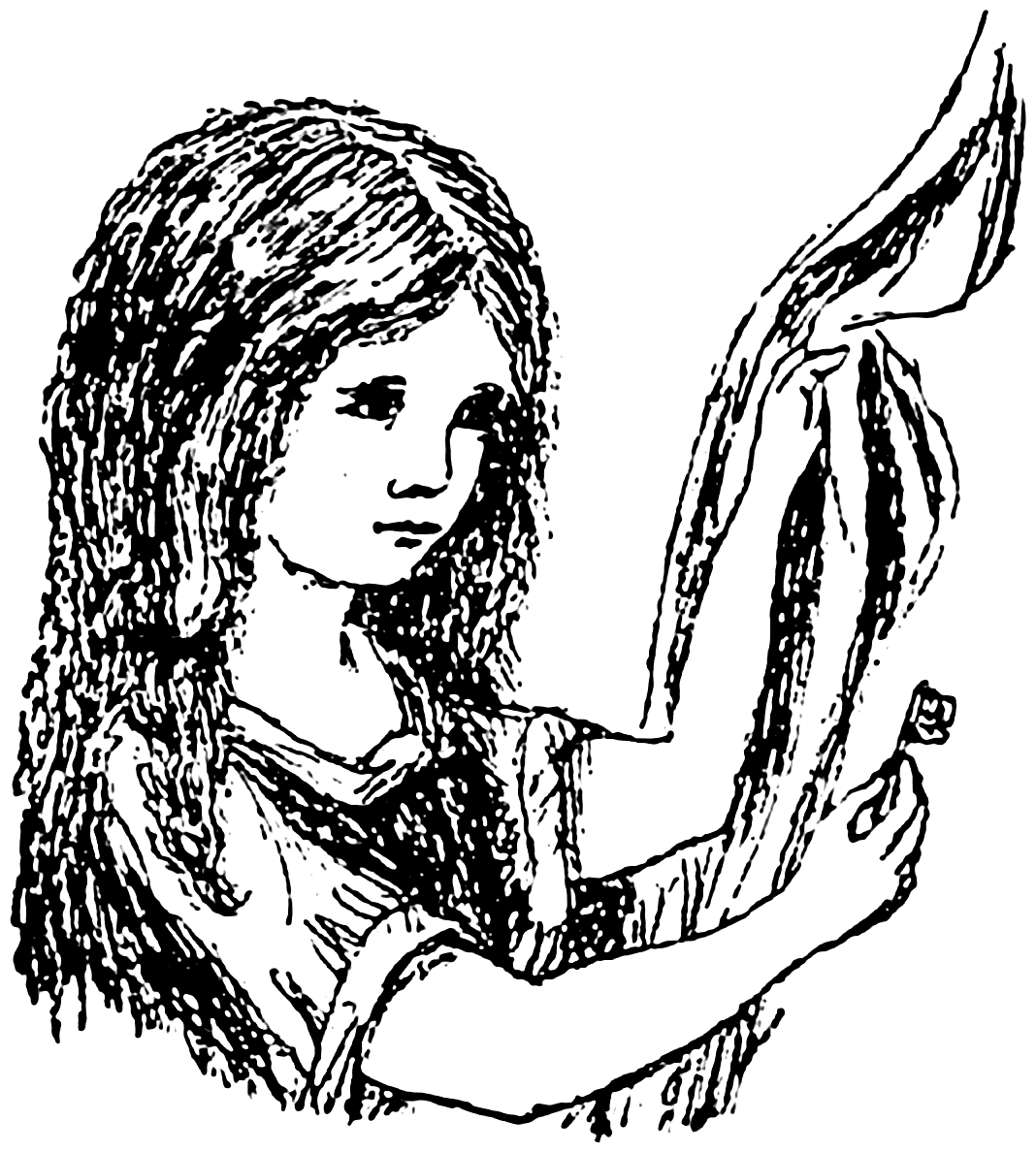
The fictional character was named after her. (Illustration by Lewis Carroll)

In the meantime, Dodgson had decided to rewrite the story as a possible commercial venture. Probably with a view to canvassing his opinion, Dodgson sent the manuscript of Under Ground to a friend, the author George MacDonald, in early 1863. The MacDonald children read the story and loved it, and this response probably persuaded Dodgson to seek a publisher. Alice's Adventures in Wonderland, with illustrations by John Tenniel, was published in 1865, under the name Lewis Carroll. A second book about the character Alice, Through the Looking-Glass and What Alice Found There, followed in 1871. In 1886, a facsimile of Alice's Adventures Under Ground, the original manuscript that Dodgson had given Liddell, was published.

== Relationship with Lewis Carroll ==
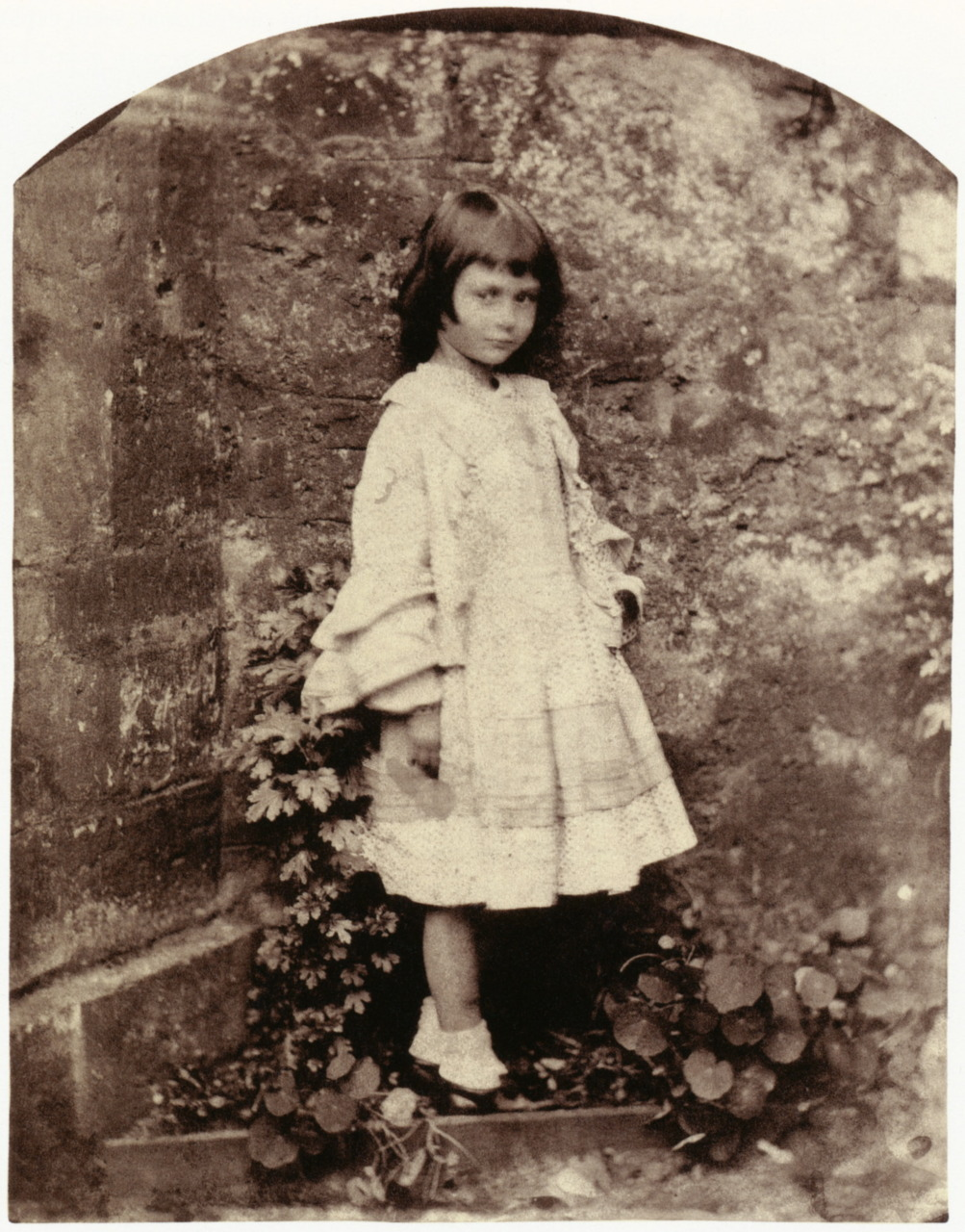
Liddell dressed in her best outfit. Photo by Charles Lutwidge Dodgson (1858).

The relationship between Liddell and Dodgson has been the source of much controversy. Dodgson met the Liddell family in 1855; he first befriended Harry, the older brother, and later took Harry and Ina on several boating trips and picnics to the scenic areas around Oxford. Later, when Harry went to school, Alice and her younger sister Edith joined the party. Dodgson entertained the children by telling them fantastic stories to while away the time. He also used them as subjects for his hobby, photography. It has often been stated that Alice was his favourite subject in these years, but there is very little evidence to suggest this; Dodgson's diaries from 18 April 1858 to 8 May 1862 are missing.

=== "Cut pages in diary" ===
The relationship between the Liddells and Dodgson suffered a sudden break in June 1863. There was no record of why the rift occurred, since the Liddells never openly spoke of it, and the single page in Dodgson's diary recording 27–29 June 1863 (which seems to cover the period in which it began) was missing; it has been speculated by biographers such as Morton N. Cohen that Dodgson may have wanted to marry the 11-year-old Alice Liddell, and that this was the cause of the unexplained break with the family in June 1863. Alice Liddell's biographer, Anne Clark, writes that Alice's descendants were under the impression that Dodgson wanted to marry her, but that "Alice's parents expected a much better match for her." Clark argues that in Victorian England such arrangements were not as improbable as they might seem; John Ruskin, for example, fell in love with a 12-year-old girl while Dodgson's younger brother sought to marry a 14-year-old, but postponed the wedding for six years.

In 1996, Karoline Leach found what became known as the "Cut pages in diary" document—a note allegedly written by Dodgson's niece, Violet Dodgson, summarising the missing page from 27 to 29 June 1863, apparently written before she (or her sister Menella) removed the page. The note reads:

L.C. learns from Mrs. Liddell that he is supposed to be using the children as a means of paying court to the governess—he is also supposed by some to be courting Ina

This might imply that the break between Dodgson and the Liddell family was caused by concern over alleged gossip linking Dodgson to the family governess and to "Ina" (both Alice's older sister and her mother were named "Lorina"). In her biography, The Mystery of Lewis Carroll, Jenny Woolf suggests that the problem was caused by Lorina becoming too attached to Dodgson and not the other way around. Woolf then uses this theory to explain why "Menella [would] remove the page itself, yet keep a note of what was on it." The note, she submits, is a "censored version" of what really happened, intended to prevent Lorina from being offended or humiliated at having her feelings for Dodgson made public.

It is uncertain who wrote the note. Leach has said that the handwriting on the front of the document most closely resembles that of either Menella or Violet Dodgson, Dodgson's nieces. However, Morton N. Cohen in an article published in the Times Literary Supplement in 2003 said that in the 1960s, Dodgson's great-nephew Philip Dodgson Jacques told him that Jacques had written the note himself based on conversations he remembered with Dodgson's nieces. Cohen's article offered no evidence to support this, however, and known samples of Jacques' handwriting do not seem to resemble the writing of the note. After this incident, Dodgson avoided the Liddell home for six months but eventually returned for a visit in December 1863. However, the former closeness does not seem to have been re-established, and the friendship gradually faded away, possibly because Dodgson was in opposition to Dean Liddell over college politics.

== Comparison with fictional Alice ==
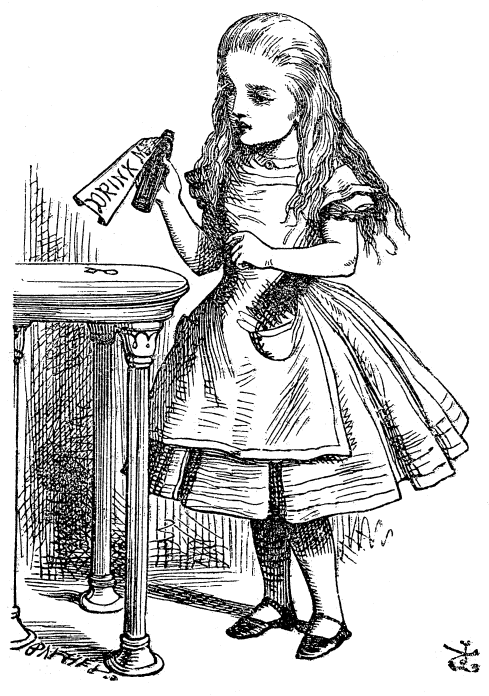
John Tenniel's Alice from Alice's Adventures in Wonderland

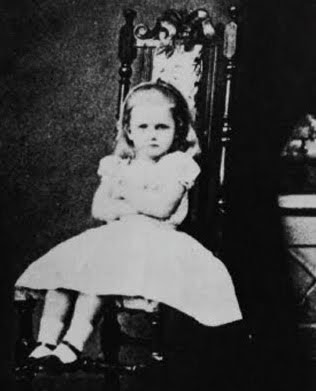
Mary Hilton Babcock. 1865

The extent to which Dodgson's Alice may be or could be identified with Liddell is controversial. The two Alices are clearly not identical, and though it was long assumed that the fictional Alice was based very heavily on Liddell, recent research has contradicted this assumption. Dodgson himself claimed in later years that his Alice was entirely imaginary and not based upon any real child at all. There was a rumour that Dodgson sent Tenniel a photo of one of his other child-friends, Mary Hilton Badcock, suggesting that he use her as a model, but attempts to find documentary support for this theory have proved fruitless. Dodgson's own drawings of the character in the original manuscript of Alice's Adventures Under Ground show little resemblance to Liddell. Biographer Anne Clark suggests that Dodgson might have used Edith Liddell as a model for his drawings.

There are at least four direct links to Liddell in the two books. First, he set them on 4 May (Liddell's birthday) and 4 November (her "half-birthday"), and in Through the Looking-Glass the fictional Alice declares that her age is "seven and a half exactly", the same as Liddell on that date. Second, he dedicated them "to Alice Pleasance Liddell". Third, in the first book, the Dormouse tells a story which begins, "Once upon a time there were three little sisters... and their names were Elsie, Lacie, and Tillie." The name Liddell was pronounced with the accent on the first syllable and would sound like little as spoken with the "t" sound flapped. Also the name "Lacie" is an anagram of "Alice", while "Elsie" refers to Lorina, whose second name was Charlotte, giving her the initials L. C. "Tillie" refers to Edith's family nickname of "Matilda".

Fourth, there is an acrostic poem at the end of Through the Looking-Glass. Reading downward, taking the first letter of each line, spells out Liddell's full name. The poem has no title in Through the Looking-Glass, but is usually referred to by its first line, "A Boat Beneath a Sunny Sky".

A boat beneath a sunny sky,
Lingering onward dreamily
In an evening of July—

Children three that nestle near,
Eager eye and willing ear,
Pleased a simple tale to hear—

Long has paled that sunny sky:
Echoes fade and memories die.
Autumn frosts have slain July.

Still she haunts me, phantomwise,
Alice moving under skies
Never seen by waking eyes.

Children yet, the tale to hear,
Eager eye and willing ear,
Lovingly shall nestle near.

In a Wonderland they lie,
Dreaming as the days go by,
Dreaming as the summers die:

Ever drifting down the stream—
Lingering in the golden gleam—
Life, what is it but a dream?

In addition, all of those who participated in the Thames boating expedition where the story was originally told (Carroll, Duckworth, and the three Liddell sisters) appear in the chapter "A Caucus-Race and a Long Tale" – but only if Alice Liddell is represented by Alice herself.

== Bibliography ==
- Björk, Christina & Eriksson, Inga-Karin (1993). The Other Alice. R & S Books. ISBN 91-29-62242-5.
- Clark, Anne (1982). The Real Alice. Stein And Day. ISBN 0-8128-2870-4.
- Gardner, Martin (1965). Introduction to Alice's Adventures under Ground by Lewis Carroll. Dover Publications. ISBN 0-486-21482-6.
- Gardner, Martin (ed.) (2000). The Annotated Alice (The Definitive Edition). Allen Lane The Penguin Press. ISBN 0-7139-9417-7.
- Gordon, Colin (1982). Beyond The Looking Glass. Harcourt Brace Jovanovich, Publishers. ISBN 0-15-112022-6.
- Gray, Donald J. The Norton Critical Edition of Alice in Wonderland. Donald J. Gray.
- Leach, Karoline (1999). In the Shadow of the Dreamchild. Peter Owens. ISBN 0-7206-1044-3. Official website
