= Sherry L. Ackerman =

American academic and dressage clinician

Sherry L. Ackerman is an American academic and dressage clinician.

She is an active scholar with the International Society for Neoplatonic Studies and has authored numerous papers and journal articles.

In 2008, Ackerman published Behind the Looking Glass, offering another perspective in the contemporary deconstruction of the "Carroll Myth". The book offers a thorough examination of the nineteenth century Neoplatonic Revival in Great Britain, with special emphasis upon its influence on the writings of Lewis Carroll: conciliatory points between revived Neoplatonism, theosophy and spiritualism are identified. Ackerman is affiliated with ContrariWise: The Association for New Lewis Carroll Studies. Dodgson biographer Morton N. Cohen, in a recent article in the Times Literary Supplement labeled their position as 'revisionists' who were attempting to rewrite history.

Ackerman is also a proponent of eco-spirituality and nature mysticism. In 2008, she published a second edition of Dressage in the Fourth Dimension. This book posits that humanity's alienation from Nature can no longer be ignored. Ackerman claims that the enormity and immediacy of the crisis is evident. Ackerman carries this claim further in The Good Life, published in 2010.

Ackerman credits Herbert Marcuse for the realization that she could be both an academic—a scholar—and a social catalyst—an activist.

Sherry died in 2023 https://www.dayfunerals.com/obituary/sherry-ackerman

== See also ==
- Karoline Leach
- Hugues Lebailly
