= Behind the Looking Glass =

Behind the Looking Glass (ISBN 978-1847184863) (Newcastle upon Tyne, UK: Cambridge Scholars Publishing), by Sherry L. Ackerman, addresses the contemporary deconstruction of the Carroll Myth . The book offers an examination of the nineteenth century Neoplatonic Revival in Great Britain., with special emphasis upon its influence on the writings of Lewis Carroll. Conciliatory points between revived Neoplatonism, theosophy and spiritualism are identified.

== See also ==
- In the Shadow of the Dreamchild
- Hugues Lebailly
