= Penrhyn (electoral ward) =

Electoral ward in Conwy, Wales

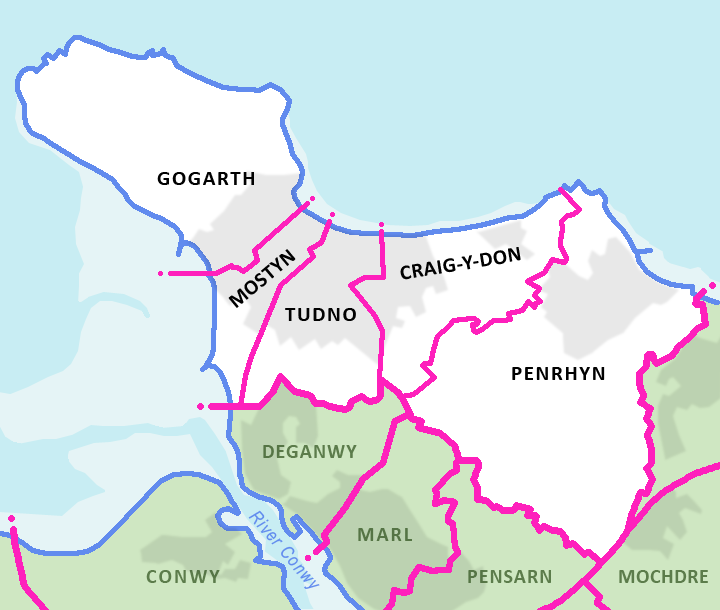
Map of electoral wards in and surrounding Llandudno

Penrhyn is one of the electoral wards in Llandudno, Conwy County Borough, Wales. It is the easternmost of the five town wards and primarily covers the large village of Penrhyn Bay. The Llandudno ward of Craig-y-Don lies to the west, with Llandrillo yn Rhos to the east.

According to the 2011 UK Census the population of the ward was 4,883.

== Town ward ==
Penrhyn is an electoral ward to Llandudno Town Council, electing four of the twenty councillors.

== County ward ==
Penrhyn was a ward to Gwynedd County Council, in the Borough of Aberconwy, between 1989 and 1996.

Since 1995 the ward has elected two county councillors to Conwy County Borough Council. At the 1995 and 1999 elections the ward elected a Liberal Democrat and a Conservative Party councillor, though subsequently elected Independent candidates.
