= Llandudno Town Hall =

Municipal Building in Llandudno, Wales

- Neuadd y Dref Llandudno (Welsh)
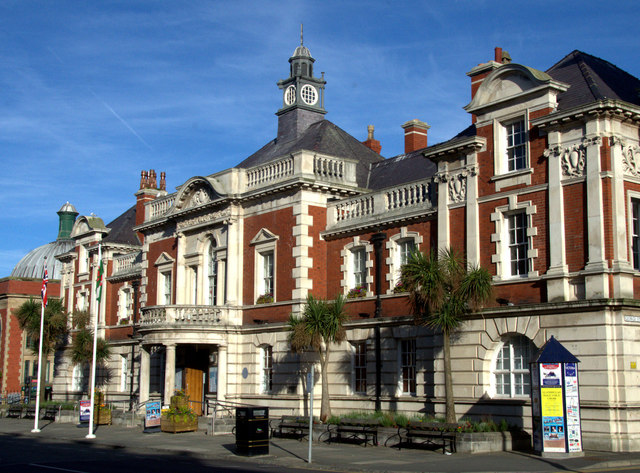
- Llandudno Town Hall

- Shown in Conwy County Borough
- 53.3240°N 3.8310°W
- Location: Lloyd Street, Llandudno

History
- Built: 1902

Site notes
- Architect: Thomas Ball Silcock
- Architectural style: Baroque style

Listed Building – Grade II
- Official name: Town Hall
- Designated: 16 March 1976
- Reference no.: 5809

Llandudno Town Hall (Welsh: Neuadd y Dref Llandudno) is a municipal structure in Lloyd Street, Llandudno, Wales. The town hall, which serves as the meeting place of Llandudno Town Council, is a Grade II listed building.

== History ==
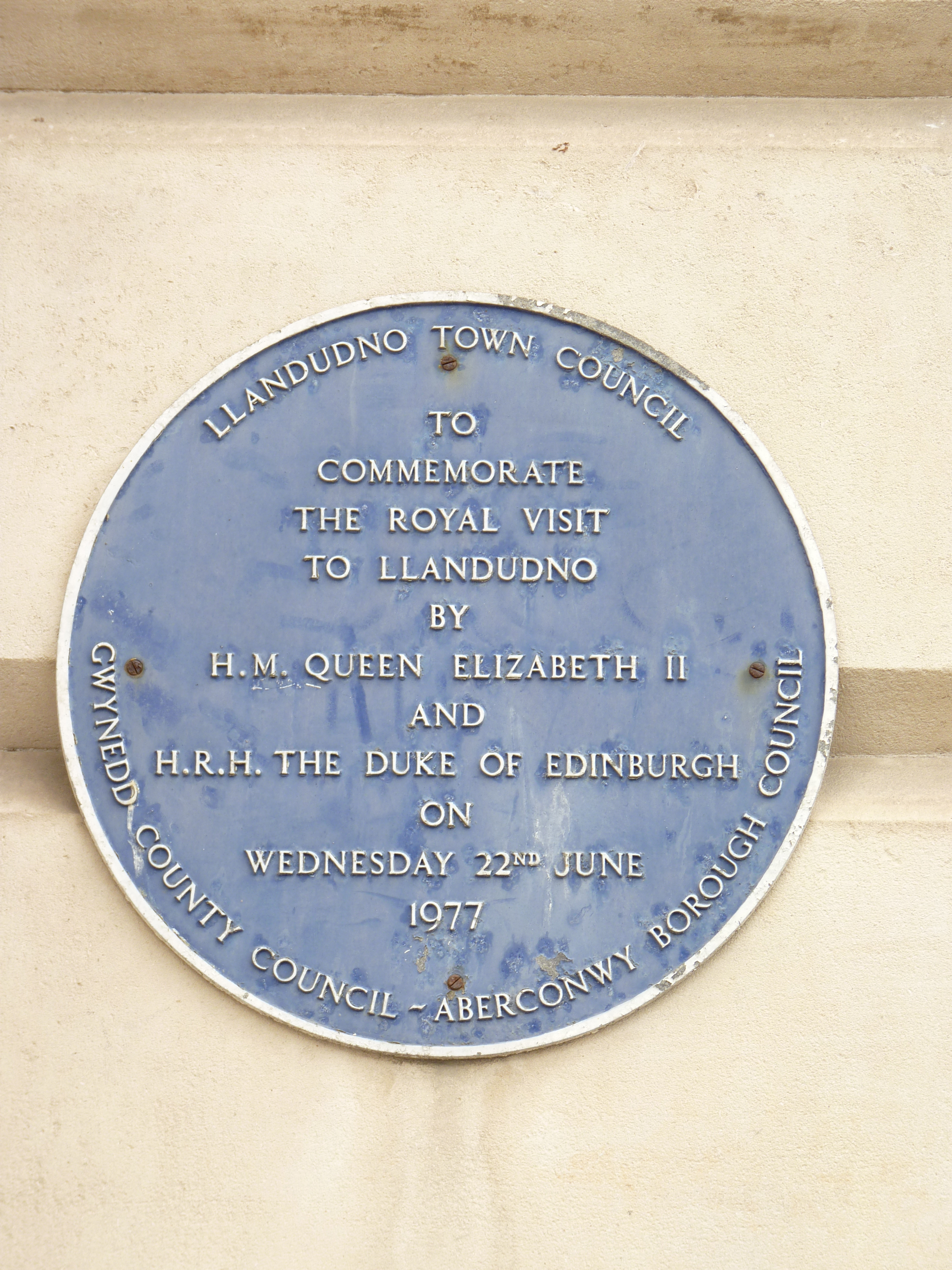
Plaque at the entrance of the town hall commemorating the royal visit in 1977

The first town hall in Llandudno was a Victorian structure in Church Walks which was procured by the local improvement commissioners and completed in 1854. It was used for magistrates' court hearings as well as an administrative centre. Following significant population growth, associated with the seaside tourism industry, the area became an urban district in 1894. In this context the new civic leaders decided to procure a new and suitably imposing town hall. The site selected, which was donated to the town by Lord Mostyn, was vacant land on Lloyd Street.

The foundation stone for the new building was laid by Lord Mostyn on 26 October 1899. It was designed by Thomas Ball Silcock, built by a local contractor, Robert Luther Roberts, with rusticated ashlar stone on the ground floor and red brick above and was officially opened by the member of parliament for Islington South, Sir Albert Rollit, on 10 February 1902. The building cost £20,000, twice the amount that was originally budgeted, leading to an inquiry as to the reasons for the cost escalation.

The design involved a symmetrical main frontage with nine bays facing onto Lloyd Street with the end bays projected forward as pavilions; the central section of three bays, which also slightly projected forward, featured a semi-circular portico with Doric order columns on the ground floor and a balcony with a Venetian window on the first floor flanked by Ionic order columns supporting an entablature, a modillioned cornice and a segmental pediment with a carved coat of arms in the tympanum. The end bays featured round headed windows on the ground floor, sash windows on the first and second floors flanked by pairs of Ionic order pilasters supporting modillioned cornices, with segmental pediments above. There was also a balustrade and a central lantern at roof level. Internally, the principal rooms were the assembly room on the ground floor and the council chamber on the first floor.

A plaque was erected at an early stage to commemorate the lives of service personnel from the Denbighshire Hussars and 3rd Volunteer Battalion, Royal Welch Fusiliers who had died in the Second Boer War. During the Second World War, a plaque was unveiled to recognise the fundraising efforts of local people to support the cost of construction of the Bangor-class minesweeper, HMS Llandudno. The assembly hall was regularly used as a public venue and concert performers included the contralto singer, Kathleen Ferrier, who made an appearance on 19 September 1945.

The town hall continued to serve as the headquarters of the urban district council for much of the 20th century but ceased to be the local seat of government after the enlarged Aberconwy District Council was formed at Bodlondeb in Conwy in 1974. Following completion of the visit of Queen Elizabeth II, accompanied by the Duke of Edinburgh, to the town as part of the Silver Jubilee celebrations in June 1977, a commemorative blue plaque was installed at the entrance of the town hall. The town hall subsequently became the meeting place of Llandudno Town Council and the local registry office as well as an approved venue for marriages and civil partnership ceremonies.
