= In the Shadow of the Dreamchild =

1999 book by Karoline Leach

In the Shadow of the Dreamchild: A New Understanding of Lewis Carroll is a 1999 book by British author Karoline Leach that posited the concept of the "Carroll Myth": the idea that many of the most famous aspects of Lewis Carroll's biography, including his supposed adoration of Alice Liddell, are more legend than fact.

Its main contentions are:

- Lewis Carroll was not 'exclusively focused' on female children as has been claimed by all previous biographers.
- He did not 'lose interest' in girls over the age of 14, and that many of his so-called 'child-friends' had actually been grown women.
- Alice Liddell was not 'the real Alice', and that Carroll was never in love with her, or asked to marry her.
- His relationships with adult women have been consistently under-examined and misreported.
- His life was haunted by an unnamed pain that may have involved a guilty love affair.

The book has had considerable impact on Carroll studies and reactions to it have been very polarised.

== See also ==
- Morton N. Cohen
- Hugues Lebailly
