= Reginald Hargreaves =

English cricketer (1852–1926)

Personal information
- Full name: Reginald Gervis Hargreaves
- Born: 13 October 1852; Accrington, Lancashire, England
- Died: 13 February 1926 (aged 73); Lyndhurst, Hampshire, England
- Batting: Right-handed
- Bowling: Unknown-arm underarm

Domestic team information
- Years: Team
- 1875–1885: Hampshire
- 1876–1878: Marylebone Cricket Club

Career statistics
Competition	First-class
Matches	25
Runs scored	544
Batting average	13.94
100s/50s	–/–
Top score	46
Balls bowled	612
Wickets	15
Bowling average	28.40
5 wickets in innings	–
10 wickets in match	–
Best bowling	4/55
Catches/stumpings	17/0
- Source: Cricinfo, 21 March 2009

Reginald Gervis Hargreaves JP (13 October 1852 – 13 February 1926) was an English first-class cricketer.

== Early life and education ==
The son of Jonathan Hargreaves and his wife, Anna Maria, he was born at Accrington in October 1852. He was educated at Eton College, before matriculating to Christ Church, Oxford; it would take him eight years to complete his degree.

== First-class cricket ==
He made his debut in first-class cricket for Hampshire against Kent at Catford Bridge. He played first-class cricket for Hampshire until 1883, making twelve appearances. For Hampshire, he scored 307 runs at an average of 15.35, with a highest score of 38 not out. With the ball, he took 14 wickets at a bowling average of 26.85, with best figures of 4 for 55. He also made four first-class appearances each for the Marylebone Cricket Club and the Gentlemen of England, in addition to appearing twice each for I Zingari and an England XI, and once for A. W. Ridley's XI. He was described in Wisden as "a good hitter, fields well at cover-point".

== Personal life ==
Hargreaves married Alice Liddell, the girl who inspired Lewis Carroll's fantasy stories. The couple were married in 1880 at Westminster Abbey, with Sir John Stainer playing the organ at the ceremony. The couple's wedding received much press coverage. The couple had three sons, two of whom would be killed in action during the First World War.

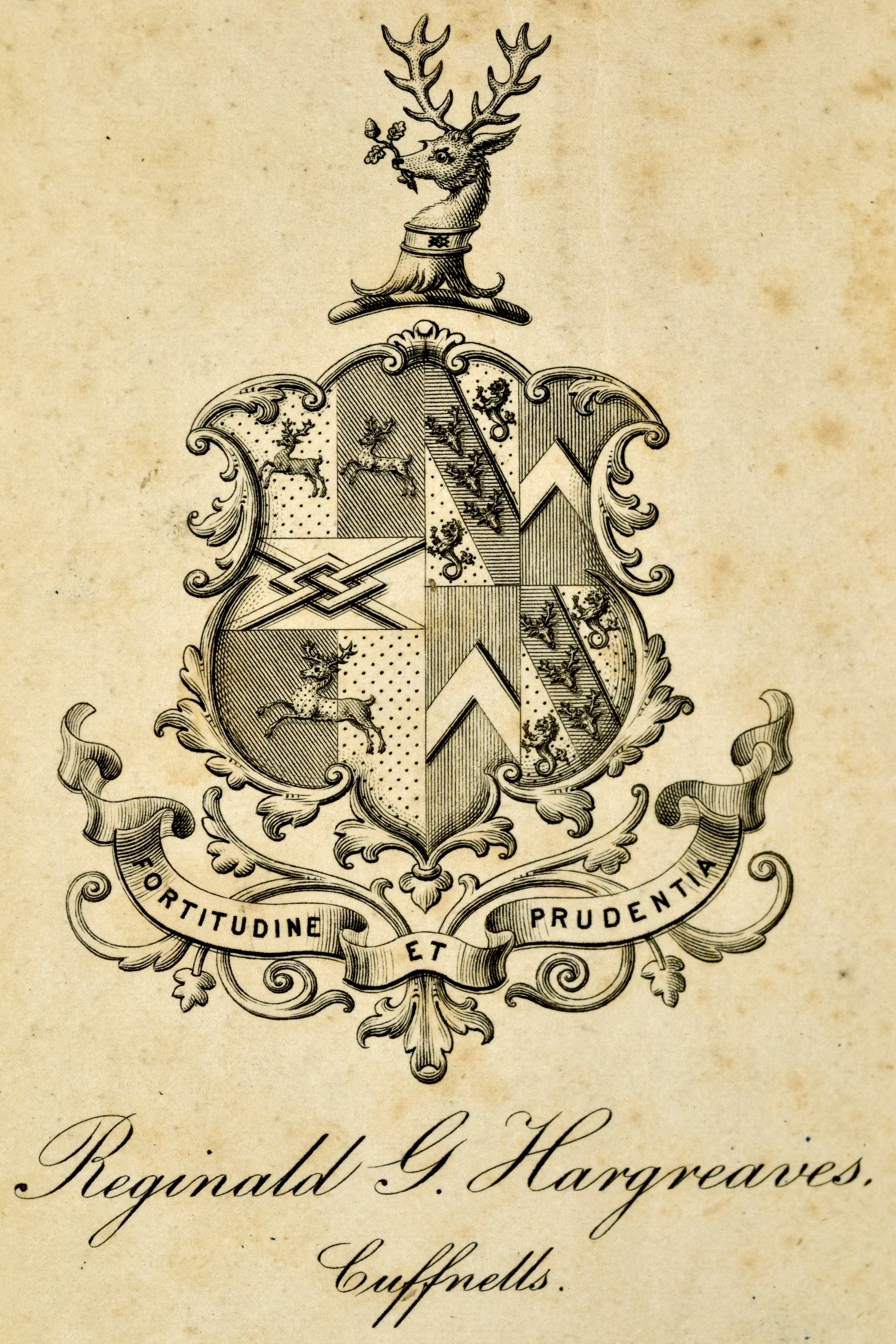
Hargreaves's bookplate.

He was a justice of the peace for both Suffolk and Hampshire, and lived at Cuffnells Park near Lyndhurst in the New Forest. Hargreaves was eminently interested in the welfare of Hampshire County Cricket Club, and was at the time of his death its vice-president. He died at Cuffnells in February 1926.
