= Llandudno =

Seaside town and community in Wales

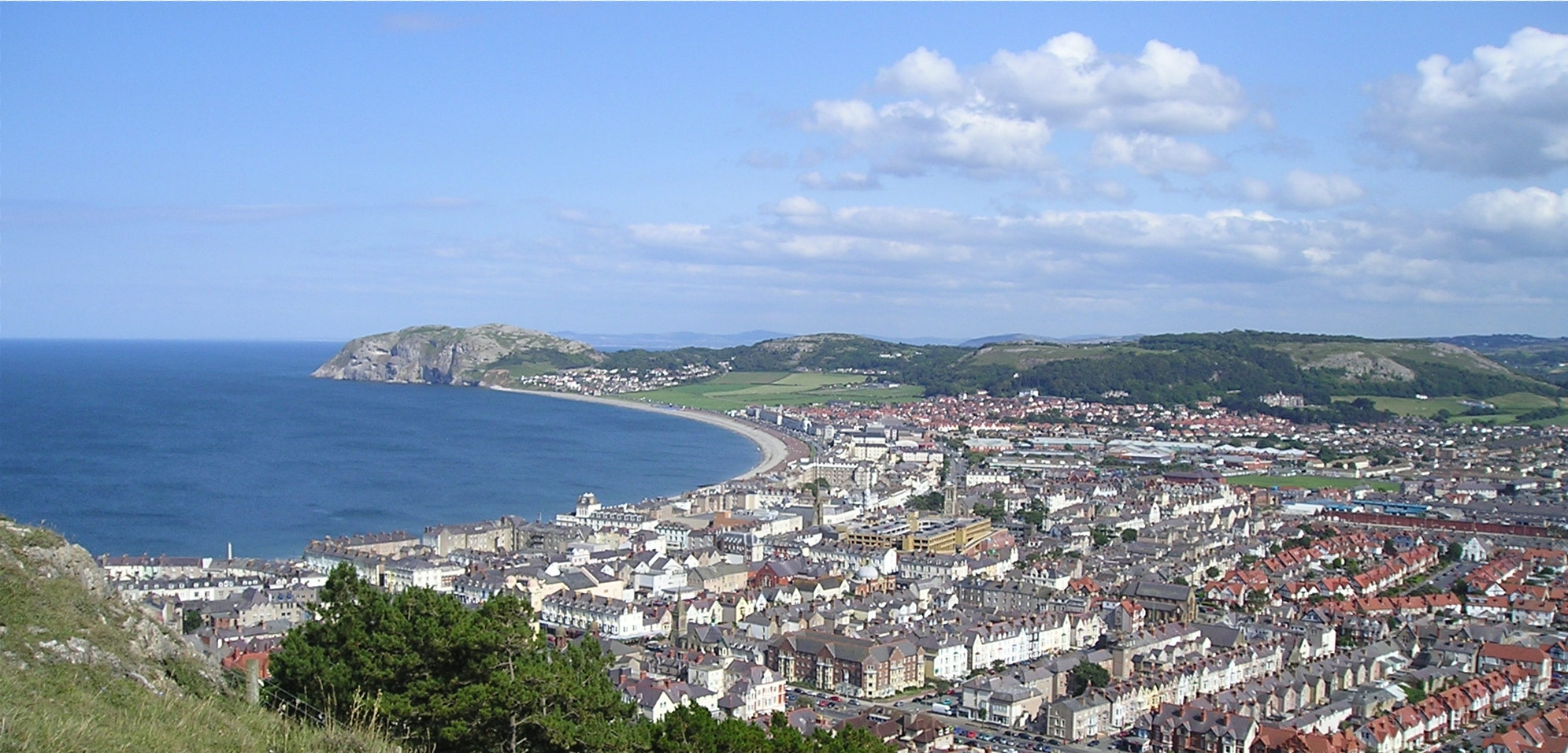
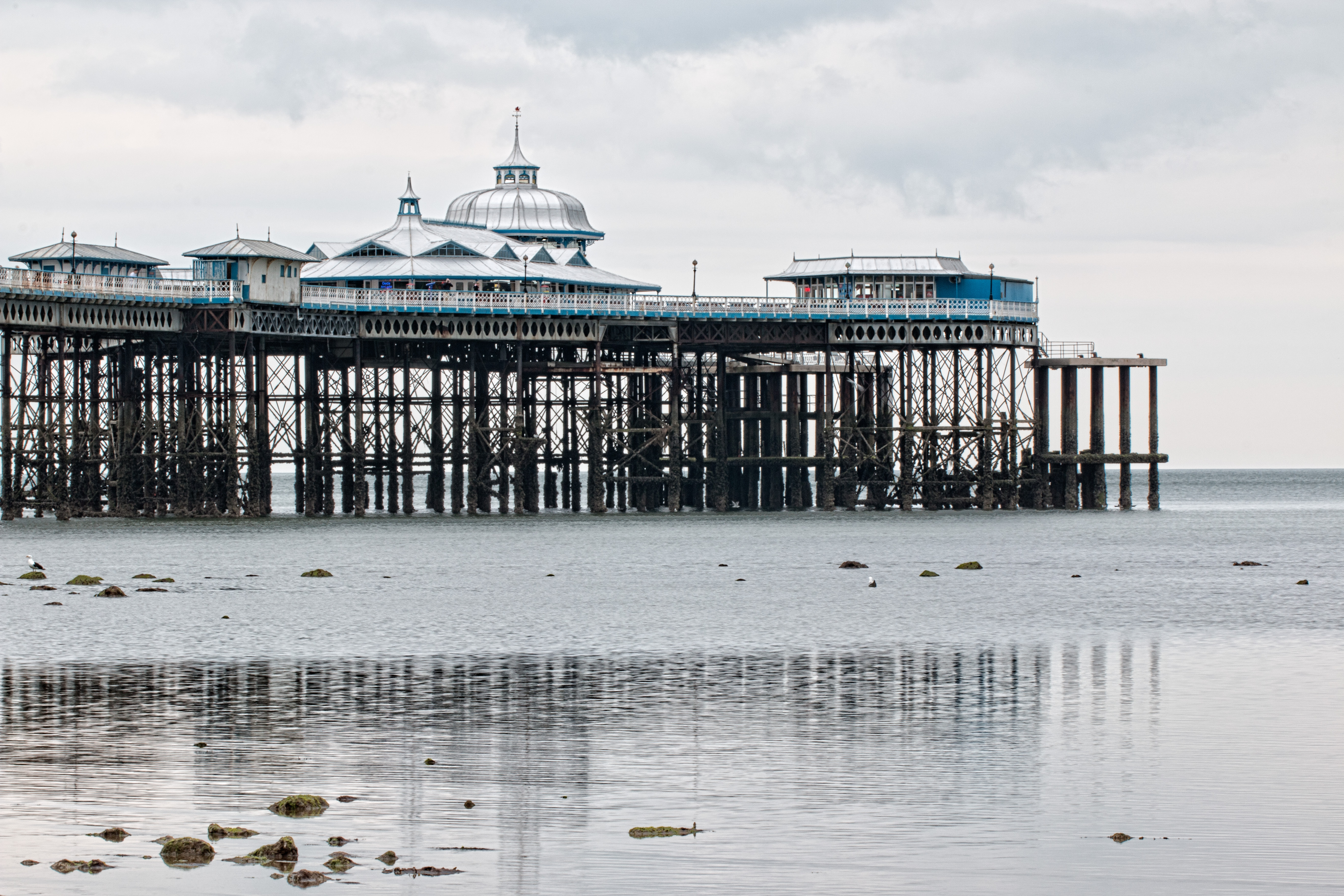
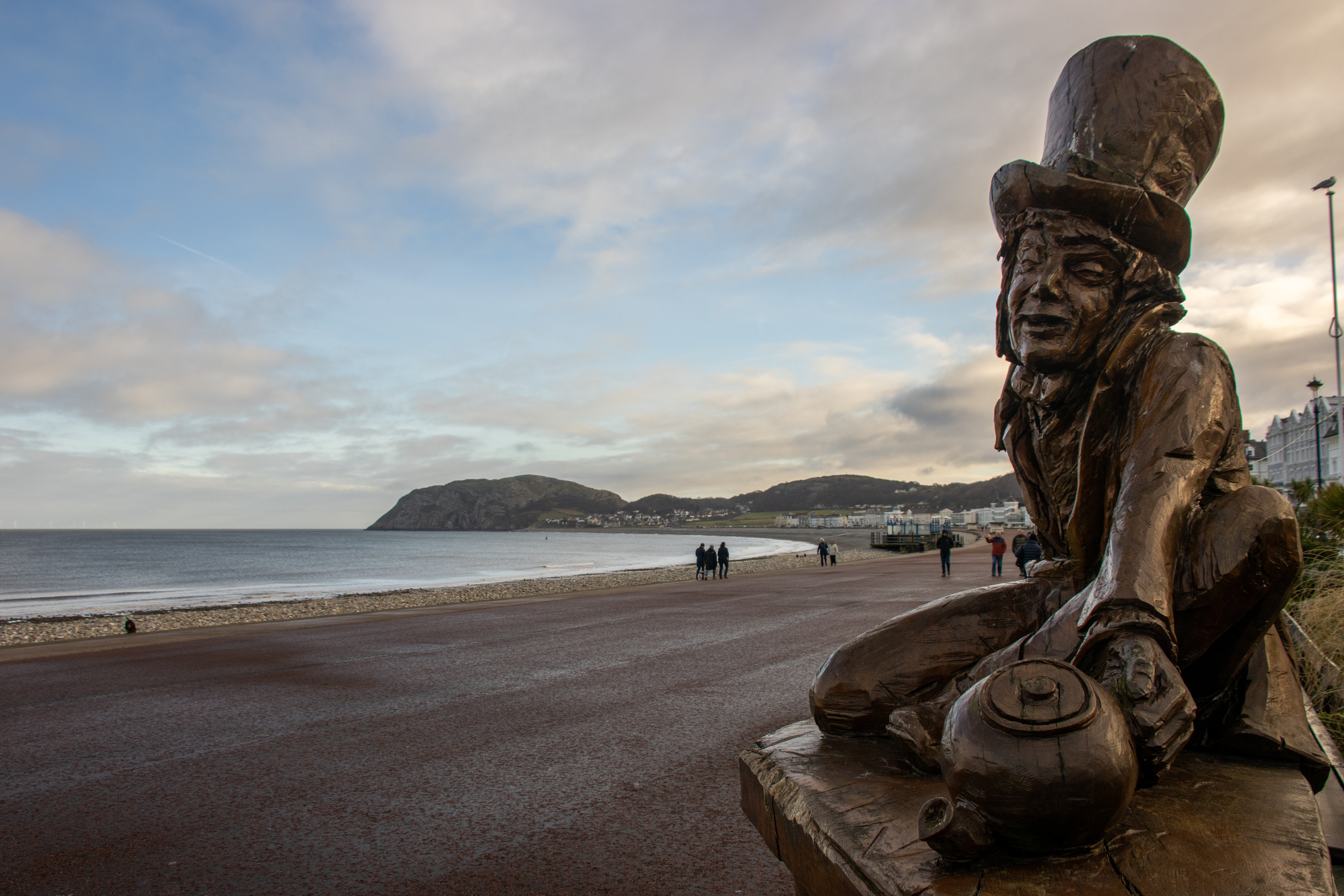
- From the top, View over Llandudno from the Great Orme, Llandudno Pier, Mad Hatter Statue on the Promenade

- Location within Conwy
- Population: 19,700 (2021 census)
- OS grid reference: SH783824
- Community: Llandudno
- Principal area: Conwy
- Preserved county: Clwyd
- Country: Wales
- Sovereign state: United Kingdom
- Post town: LLANDUDNO
- Postcode district: LL30
- Dialling code: 01492
- Police: North Wales
- Fire: North Wales
- Ambulance: Welsh
- UK Parliament: Bangor Aberconwy
- Senedd Cymru – Welsh Parliament: Bangor Conwy Môn
- List of places UK Wales Conwy 53°19′21″N 3°49′30″W Map of the community

Llandudno (/lænˈdɪdnoʊ/, Welsh: [ɬanˈdɨdnɔ]) is a seaside resort, town and community in Conwy County Borough, Wales, located on the Creuddyn peninsula, which protrudes into the Irish Sea. In the 2021 UK census, the Llandudno community, which includes Gogarth, Penrhyn Bay, Craigside, Glanwydden, Penrhynside and Bryn Pydew had a population of around 19,700. The town takes its name from Saint Tudno, with Llandudno meaning "Church of Saint Tudno".

Llandudno is a major seaside resort in Wales, and as early as 1861 was being called 'the Queen of the Welsh Watering Places' (a phrase later also used in connection with Tenby and Aberystwyth; the word 'resort' came a little later). Historically a part of Caernarfonshire, Llandudno was formerly in the district of Aberconwy within Gwynedd until 1996.

== History ==
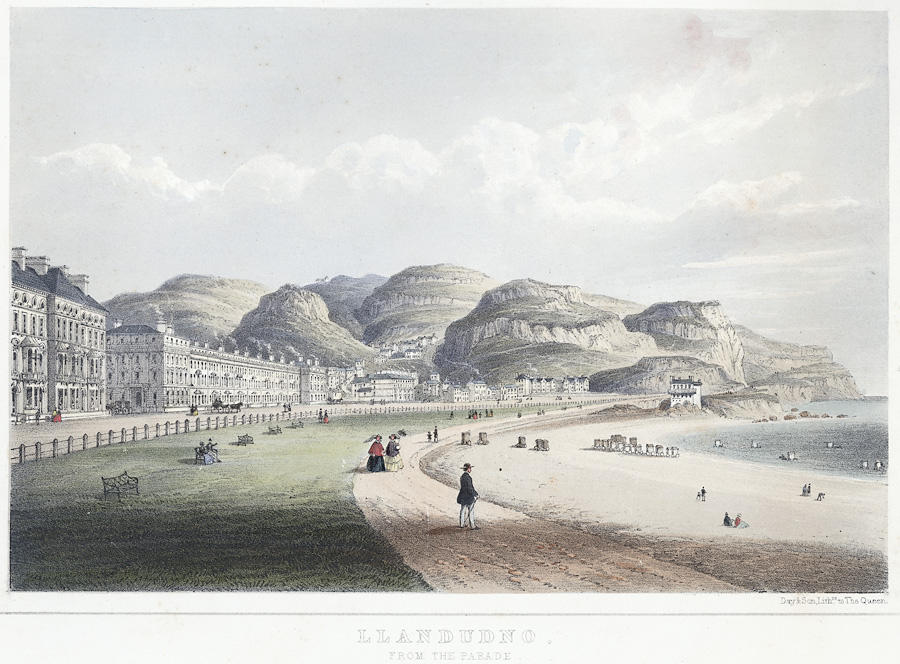
Llandudno, from the parade, 1860

The town of Llandudno developed from Stone Age all the way through to Iron Age settlements over many hundreds of years on the slopes of the limestone headland, known to seafarers as the Great Orme and to landsmen as the Creuddyn Peninsula. The origins in recorded history are with the Manor of Gogarth conveyed by King Edward I to Annan, Bishop of Bangor in 1284. The manor comprised three townships, Y Gogarth in the southwest, Y Cyngreawdr in the north (with the parish church of St Tudno) and Yr Wyddfid in the southeast.

Modern Llandudno takes its name from the ancient parish of Saint Tudno. The modern town has grown beyond the ancient parish boundaries to encompass several neighbouring area, including Craig-y-Don and Penrhyn Bay, which were in the parish of Llanrhos (or Eglwys Rhos), which also included Llanrhos village and Deganwy. The ancient parishes of Llandudno, Llanrhos and Llangystennin were in the medieval commote of Creuddyn in the Kingdom of Gwynedd, which was made part of the new county of Caernarfonshire under the Statute of Rhuddlan in 1284.

=== Great Orme ===
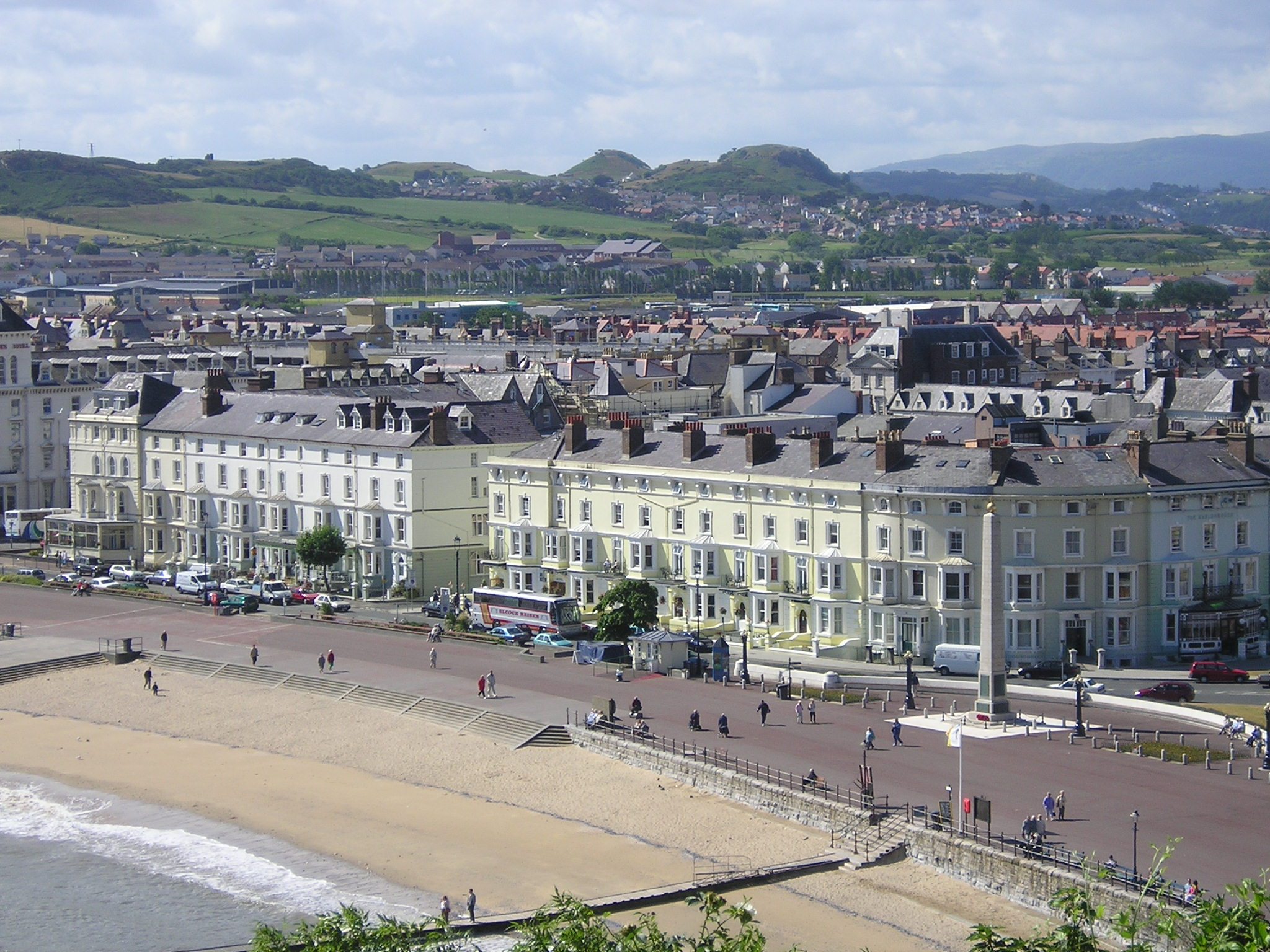
Llandudno South Parade (on the north shore) viewed from the Great Orme, with the twin mounds of Deganwy Castle in the distance

Mostly owned by Mostyn Estates, the Great Orme is home to several large herds of wild Kashmiri goats originally descended from a pair presented by the Shah of Persia to Queen Victoria and subsequently given to Lord Mostyn. These goats are also known to frequently roam the main streets of Llandudno. The summit of the Great Orme stands at 679 feet (207 m). The Summit Hotel, now a tourist attraction, was once the home of world middleweight champion boxer Randolph Turpin.

The limestone headland is a haven for flora and fauna, with some rare species such as peregrine falcons and a species of wild cotoneaster (cambricus) which can only be found on the Great Orme. The sheer limestone cliffs provide ideal nesting conditions for a wide variety of sea birds, including cormorants, shags, guillemots, razorbills, puffins, kittiwakes, fulmars and numerous gulls.

There are several attractions including the Great Orme Tramway and the Llandudno Cable Car that takes tourists to the summit. The Great Orme also has the longest toboggan run in Britain at 750m long.

=== Development ===
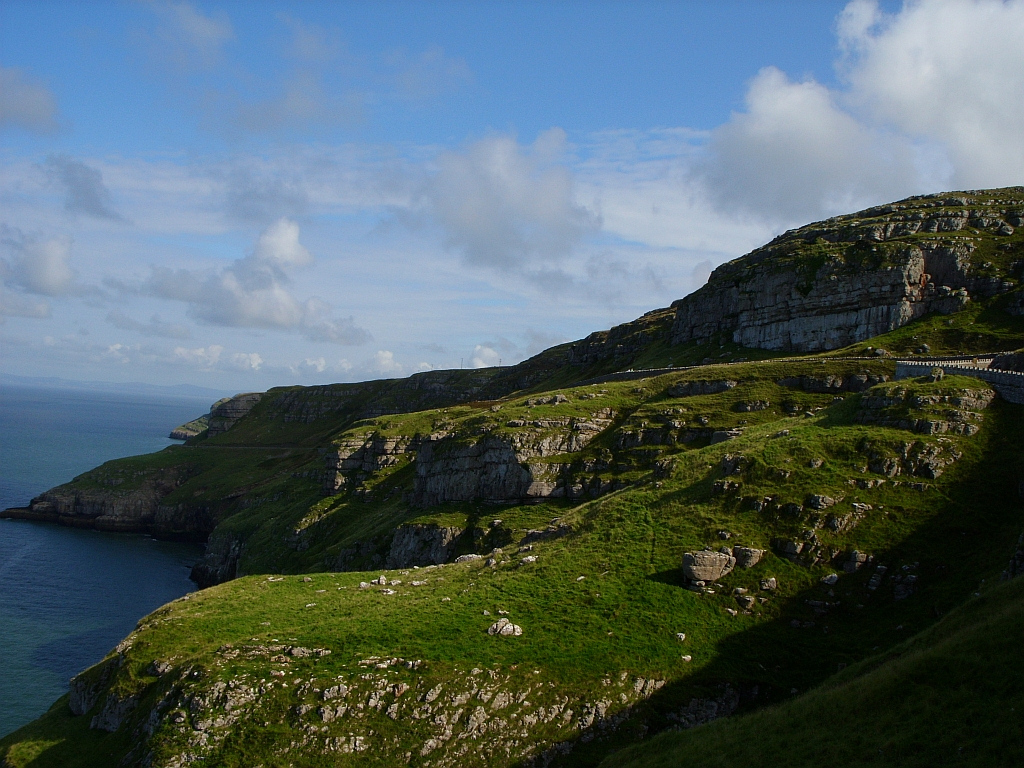
A view of the Great Orme from the Llandudno Lighthouse

By 1847 the town had grown to a thousand people, served by the new church of St George, built in 1840. The great majority of the men worked in the copper mines, with others employed in fishing and subsistence agriculture.

In 1848, Owen Williams, an architect and surveyor from Liverpool, presented Lord Mostyn with plans to develop the marshlands behind Llandudno Bay as a holiday resort. These were enthusiastically pursued by Lord Mostyn. The influence of the Mostyn Estate and its agents over the years was paramount in the development of Llandudno, especially after the appointment of George Felton as surveyor and architect in 1857. Between 1857 and 1877 much of central Llandudno was developed under Felton's supervision. Felton also undertook architectural design work, including the design and execution of Holy Trinity Church in Mostyn Street.

== Transport ==
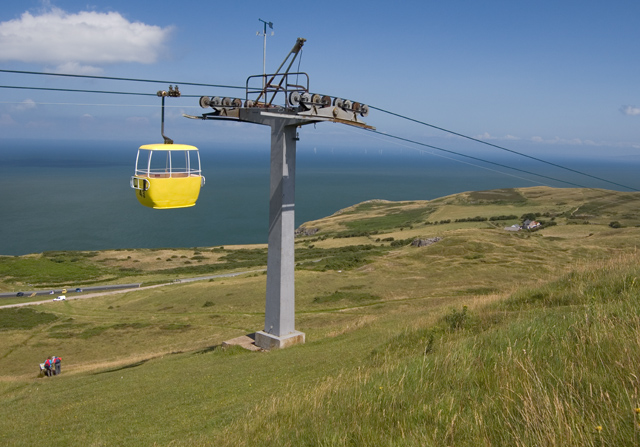
Llandudno Cable Car

=== Railway ===
The town is served by Llandudno railway station, which is the northern terminus of a 3 miles (4.8 km) long branch line from Llandudno Junction. There are generally half-hourly services between the two stations; some trains continue to Blaenau Ffestiniog or to Manchester Airport.

Llandudno Junction station is sited on the North Wales Coast railway line, which was opened as the Chester and Holyhead Railway in 1848. It became part of the London and North Western Railway in 1859 and part of the London, Midland and Scottish Railway in 1923. Llandudno was specifically built as a mid-Victorian era holiday destination and the branch line opened in 1858, with an intermediate station at Deganwy.

=== Buses ===
The town is served by Arriva Buses Wales, with services to Rhyl, Bangor, Caernarfon and the Great Orme summit. In addition, Llew Jones provides services to Betws-y-coed and Llanrwst.

=== Trams ===
The Great Orme Tramway runs from the centre of the town to the summit of the Great Orme and is Great Britain's only remaining cable-operated street tramway.

The former Llandudno and Colwyn Bay Electric Railway operated an electric tramway service between Llandudno and Rhos-on-Sea from 1907; this was extended to Colwyn Bay in 1908. The service closed in 1956. In Llandudno, the original tramway went up the middle of Gloddaeth Street, down Mostyn Street, through Penrhyn Bay and across to Colwyn Bay.

== Attractions ==
=== Llandudno Bay and the North Shore ===
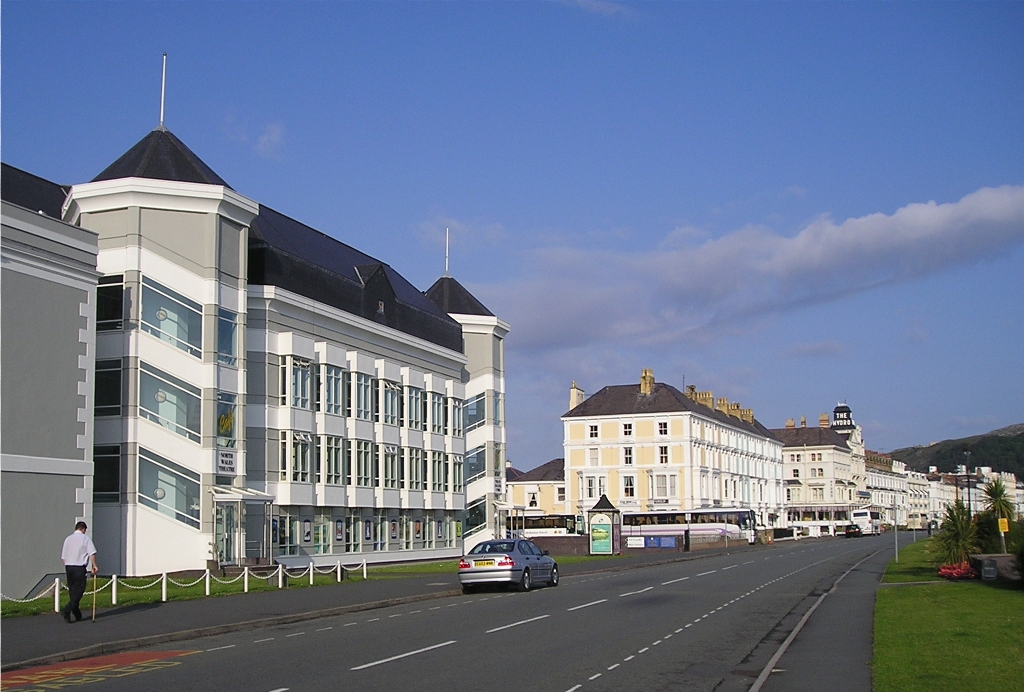
Venue Cymru – the North Wales Theatre near the centre of the promenade

For most of the length of Llandudno's North Shore there is a wide curving Victorian promenade. The road, collectively known as The Parade, has a different name for each block and it is on these parades and crescents that many of Llandudno's hotels are built. The North Wales Theatre, Arena and Conference Centre, built in 1994, and extended in 2006 and renamed "Venue Cymru" is located near the centre of the bay.

=== Llandudno Pier ===
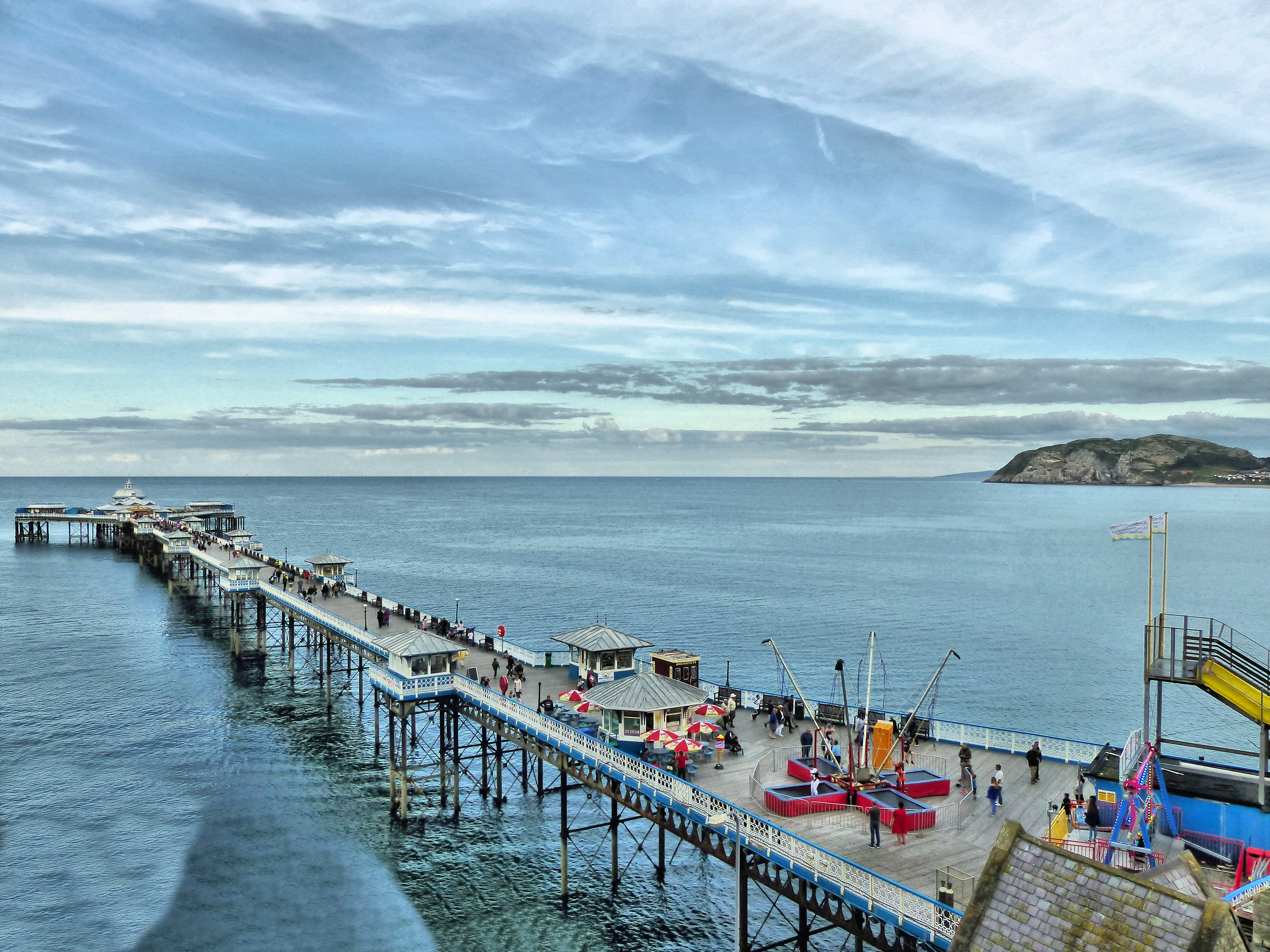
Llandudno pier from Marine Drive

The Llandudno Pier is on the North Shore. Built in 1877, it is a Grade II listed building. The pier was extended in 1884 in a landward direction along the side of what was the Baths Hotel (where the Grand Hotel now stands).

=== Happy Valley and Haulfre Gardens ===
The Happy Valley, a former quarry, was the gift of Lord Mostyn to the town in celebration of the Golden Jubilee of Queen Victoria in 1887. The area was landscaped and developed as gardens, two miniature golf courses, a putting green, a popular open-air theatre and extensive lawns. The ceremonies connected with the Welsh National Eisteddfod were held there in 1896 and again in 1963. The gardens are listed at Grade II on the Cadw/ICOMOS Register of Parks and Gardens of Special Historic Interest in Wales.

Haulfre Gardens were developed as the private gardens to a house, Sunny Hill, in the north-west of the town. Later acquired by the council, they were opened as a public park in 1929, the opening ceremony being conducted by David Lloyd George. The gardens are listed Grade II on the Cadw/ICOMOS register.

=== Marine Drive ===
The first route round the perimeter of the Great Orme was a footpath constructed in 1858 by Reginald Cust, a trustee of the Mostyn Estate. In 1872 the Great Ormes Head Marine Drive Co. Ltd. was formed to turn the path into a carriage road. Following bankruptcy, a second company completed the road in 1878. The contractors for the scheme were Messrs Hughes, Morris, Davies, a consortium led by Richard Hughes of Madoc Street, Llandudno. The road was bought by Llandudno Urban District Council in 1897.

The 4 miles (6.4 km) one-way drive starts at the foot of the Happy Valley. After about 1.5 miles (2.4 km) a side road leads to St Tudno's Church, the Great Orme Bronze Age Copper Mine and the summit of the Great Orme. Continuing on the Marine Drive the Great Orme Lighthouse (now a small hotel) is passed, and, shortly afterwards on the right, the Rest and Be Thankful Cafe and information centre. Below the Marine Drive at its western end is the site of the wartime Coast Artillery School (1940–1945), now a scheduled monument.

=== West Shore ===
The West Shore is a quiet beach on the estuary of the River Conwy. It was here at Pen Morfa that Alice Liddell (of Alice in Wonderland fame) spent the long summer holidays of her childhood.

=== Mostyn Street ===
Running behind the promenade is Mostyn Street leading to Mostyn Broadway and then Mostyn Avenue. These are the main shopping streets of Llandudno and Craig-y-Don. Mostyn Street accommodates the high street shops, the major high street banks and building societies, two churches, amusement arcades and Llandudno Library. The last is the starting point for the Llandudno Town Trail.

=== Victorian Extravaganza ===
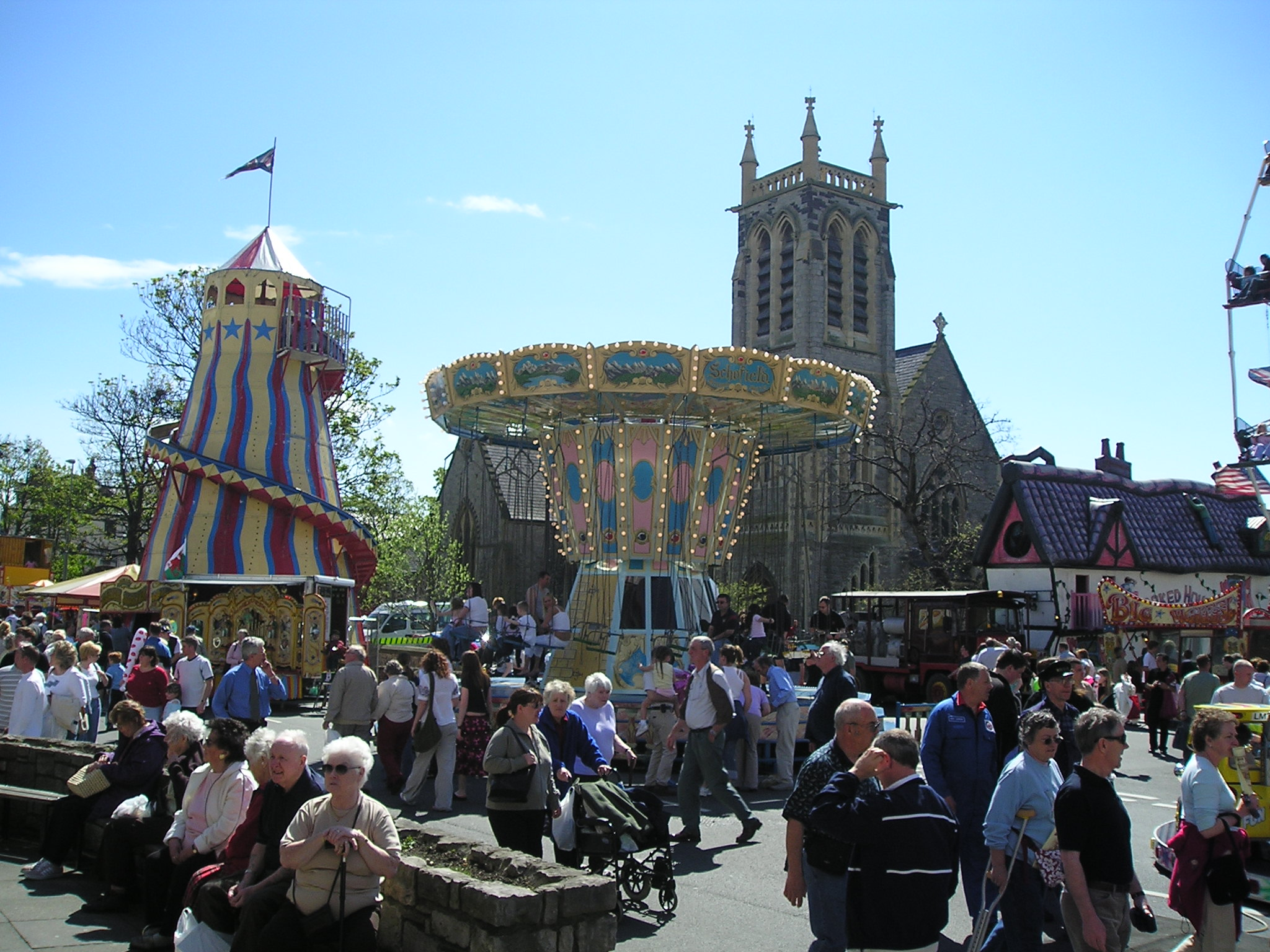
All the fun of the fair in Trinity Square at the Victorian Extravaganza

Every year in May bank holiday weekend, Llandudno has a three-day Victorian Carnival and Mostyn Street becomes a funfair. Madoc Street and Gloddaeth Street and the Promenade become part of the route each day of a mid-day carnival parade. The Bodafon Farm fields become the location of a Festival of Transport.

== Llandudno Lifeboat ==
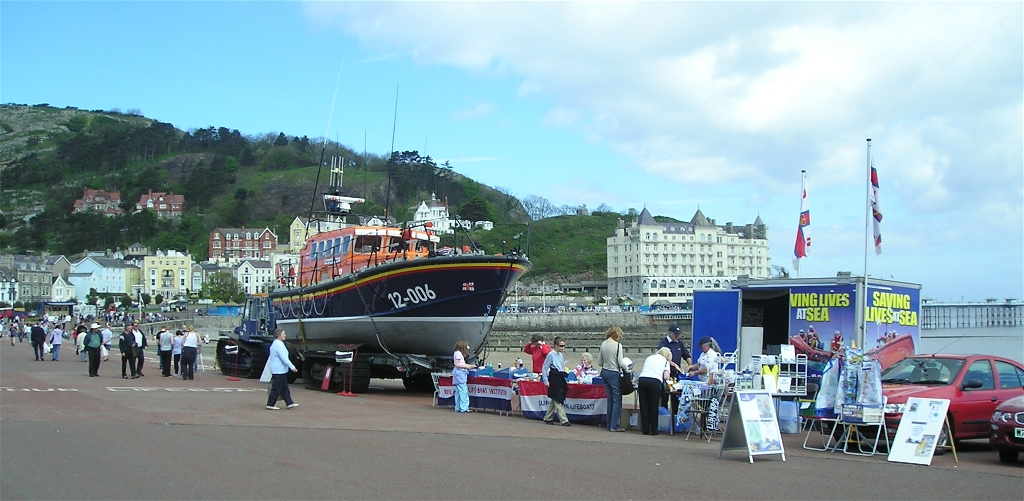
The Llandudno Lifeboat on the promenade

Until 2017, Llandudno was unique within the United Kingdom in that its lifeboat station was located inland, allowing it to launch with equal facility from either the West Shore or the North Shore as needed. In 2017, a new lifeboat station was completed, and new, high-speed, offshore and inshore lifeboats, and a modern launching system, were acquired. This station is close to the paddling pool on North Shore. Llandudno's active volunteer crews are called out more than ever with the rapidly increasing numbers of small pleasure craft sailing in coastal waters. The Llandudno Lifeboat is normally on display on the promenade every Sunday and bank holiday Monday from May until October.

== Places of worship ==
The ancient parish church dedicated to Saint Tudno stands in a hollow near the northern point of the Great Orme and two miles (3 km) from the present town. It was established as an oratory by Tudno, a 6th-century monk, but the present church dates from the 12th century and it is still used on summer Sunday mornings. It was the Anglican parish church of Llandudno until that status was transferred first to St George's (now closed) and later to Holy Trinity Church in Mostyn Street.

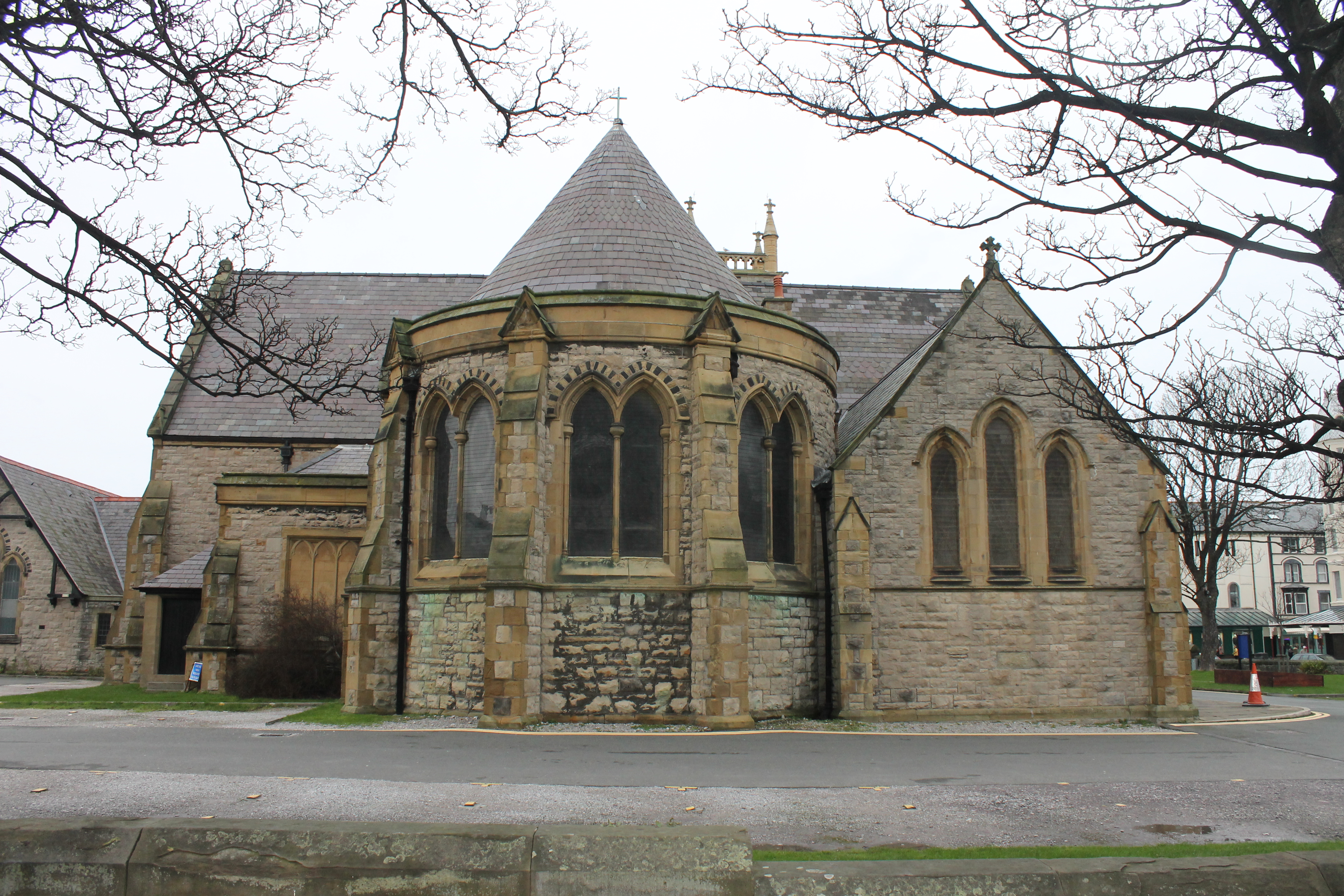

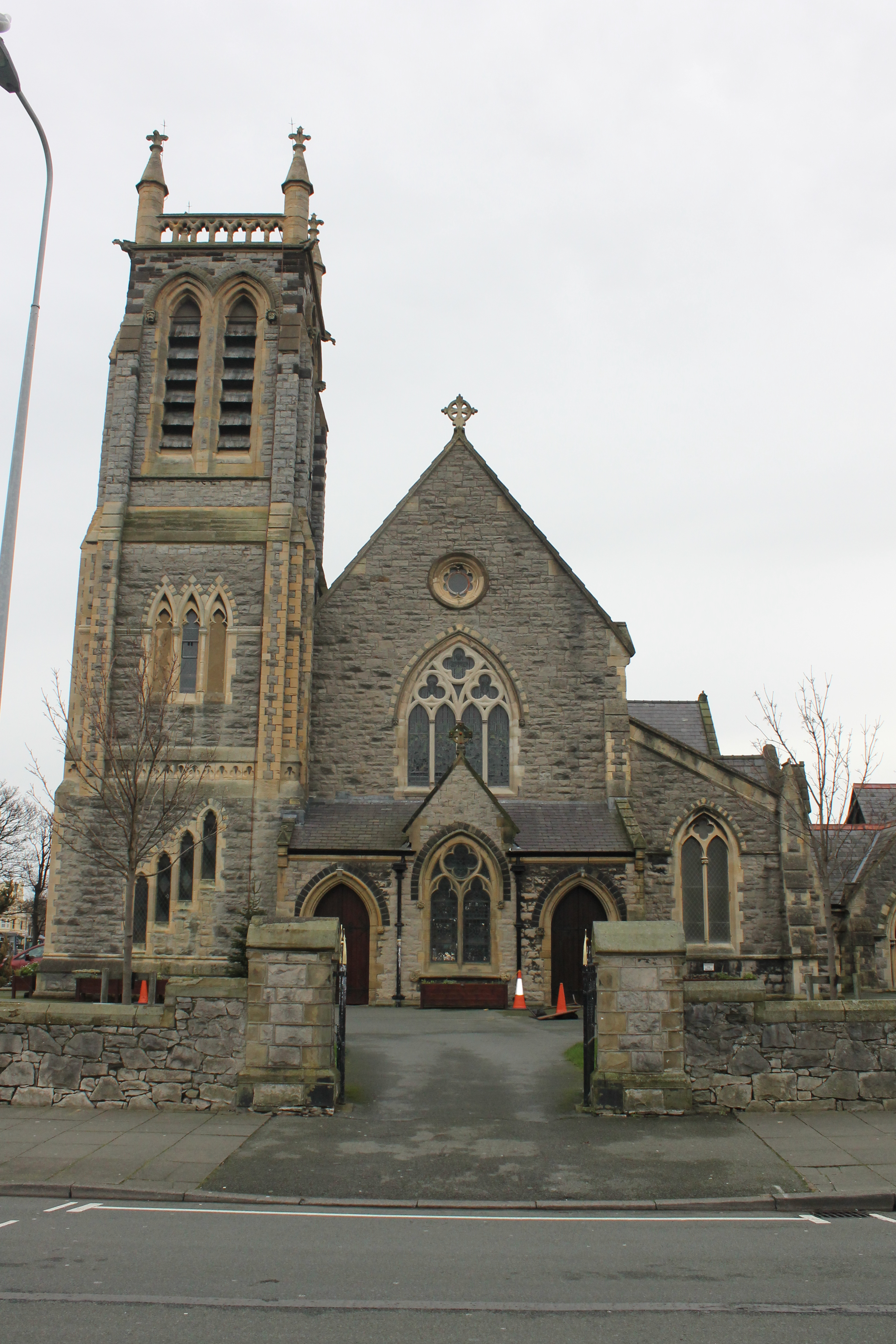

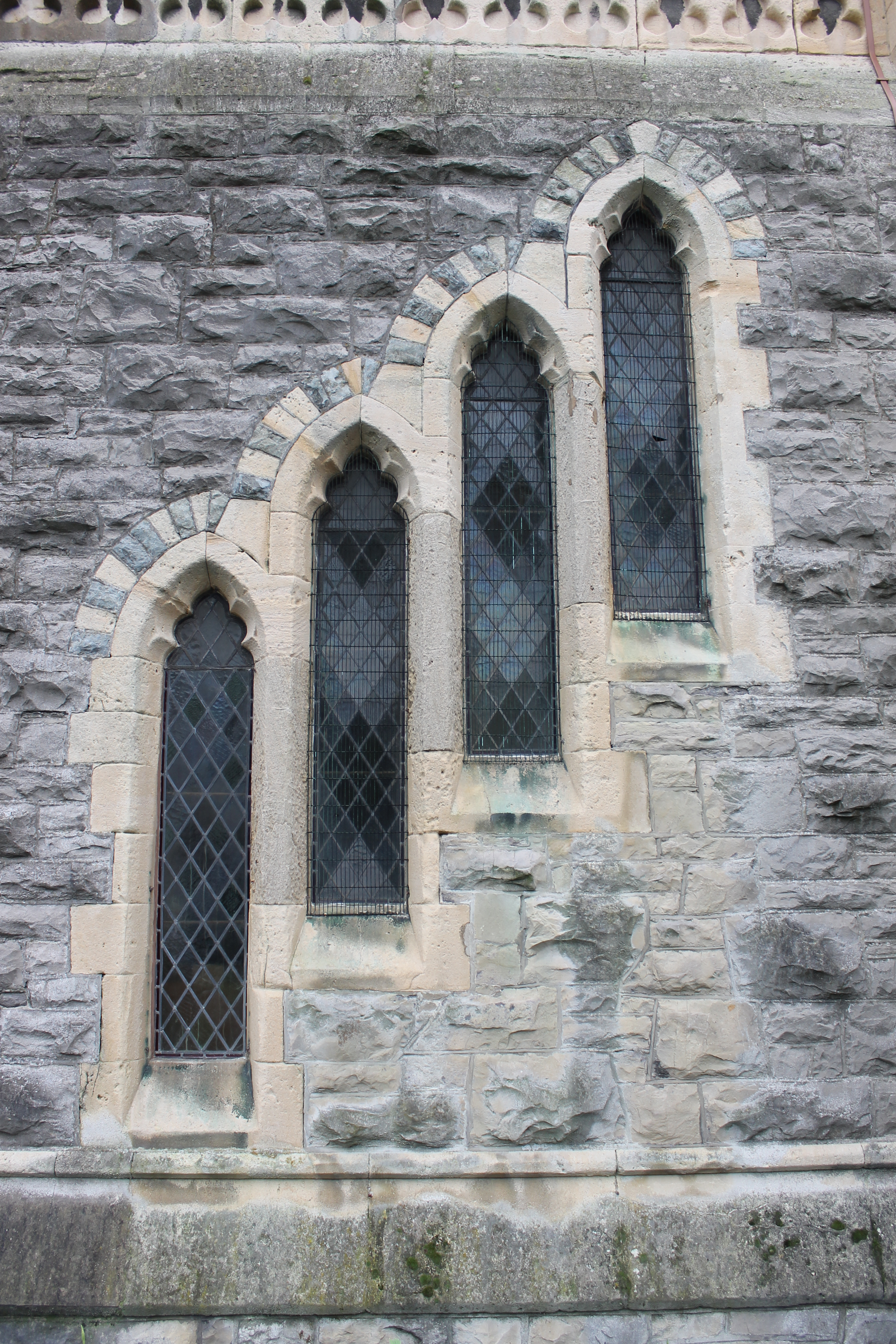

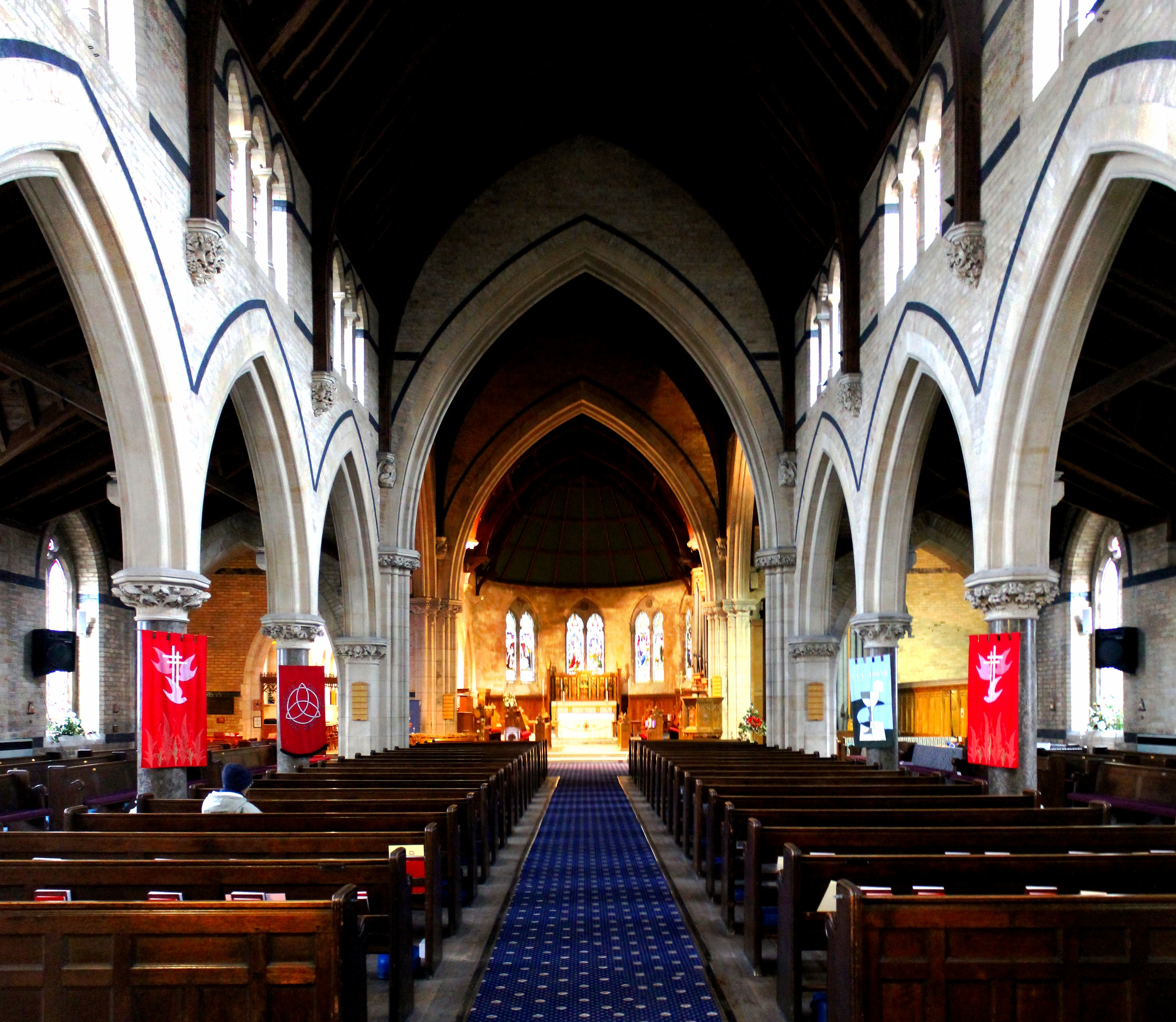

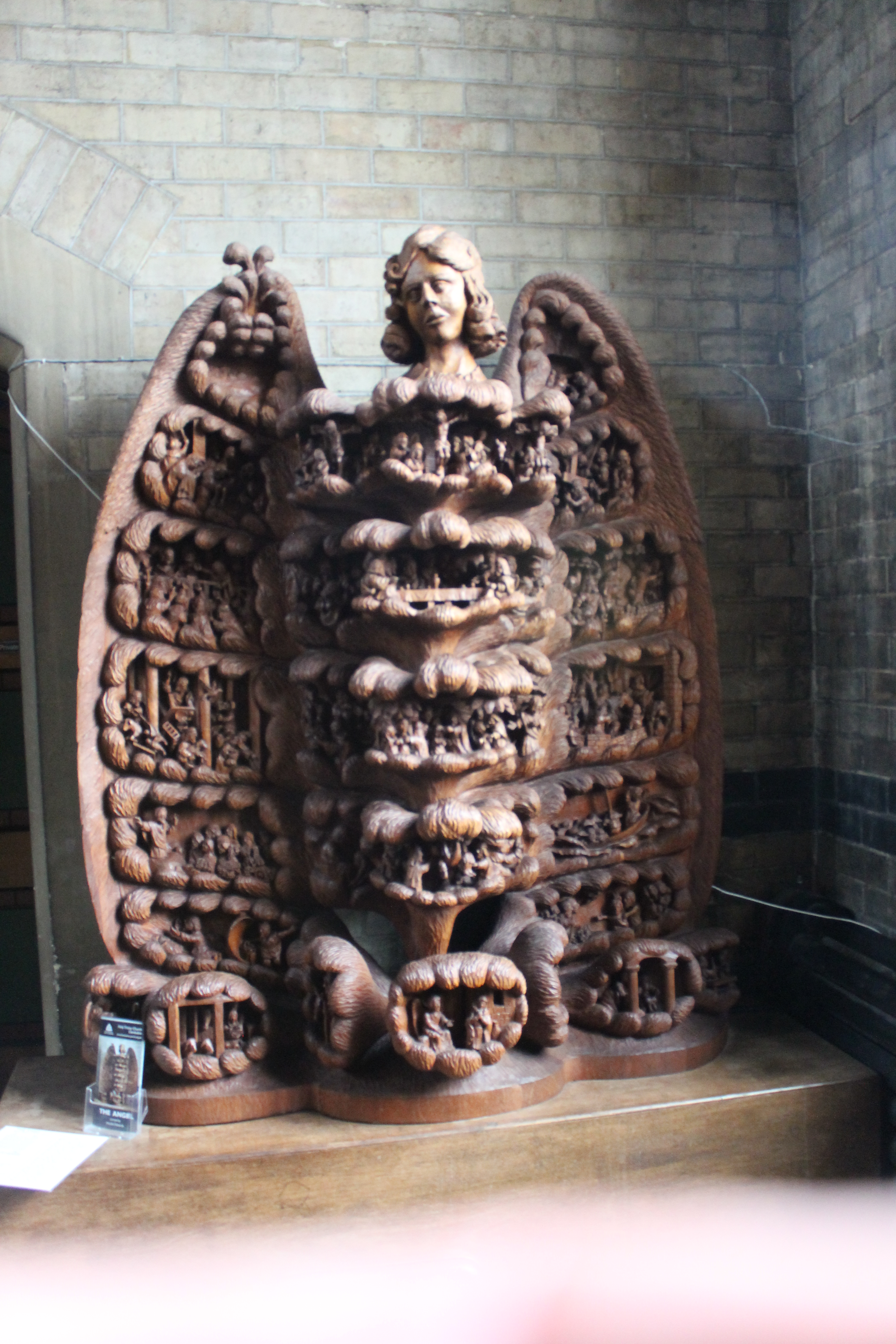

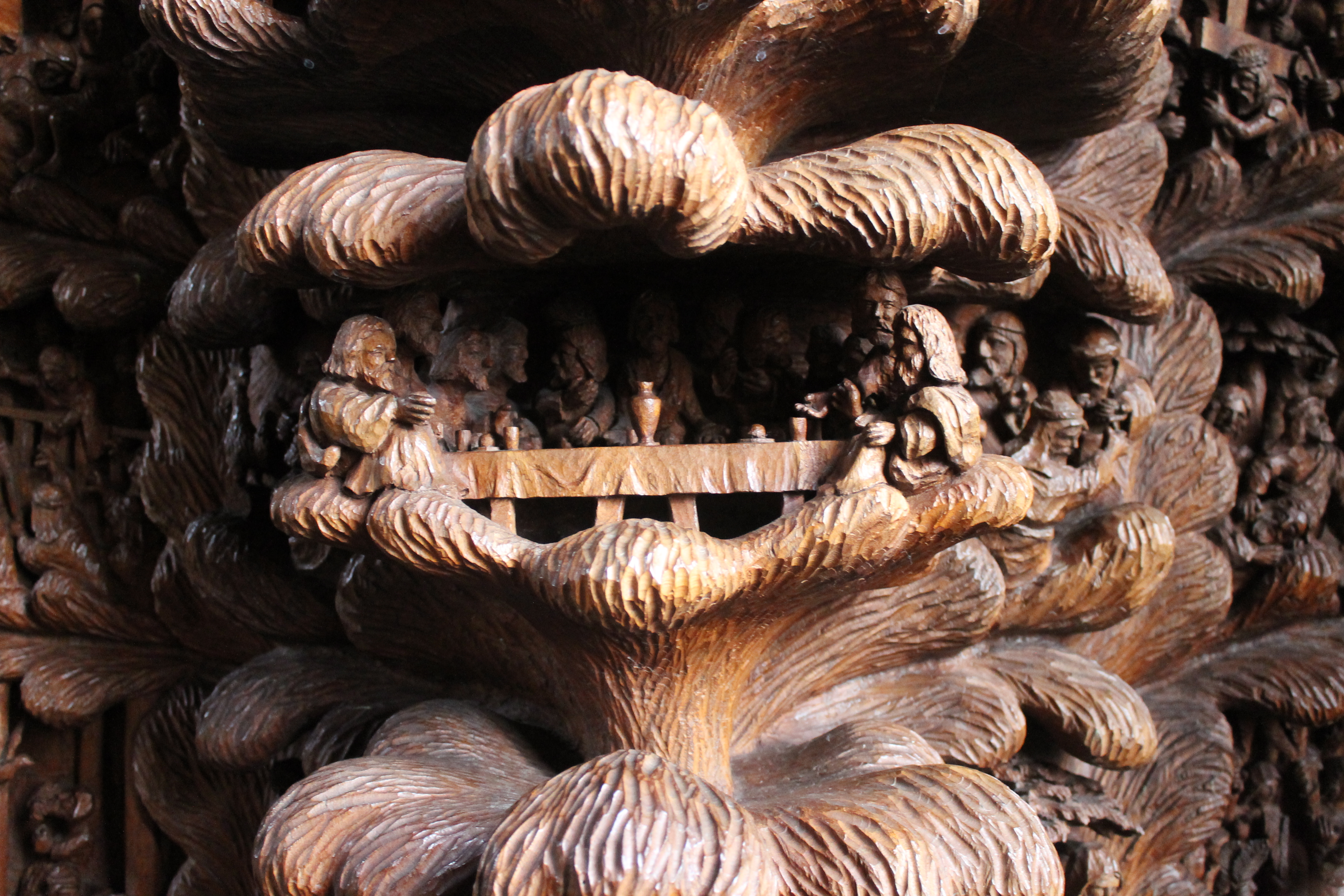

The principal Christian Churches of Llandudno are members of Cytûn (churches together) and include the Church in Wales (Holy Trinity and also Saint Paul's at Craig-y-Don), the Roman Catholic Church of Our Lady Star of the Sea, Saint John's Methodist Church, Gloddaeth United Church (Presbyterian), Assemblies of God (Pentecostal), Llandudno Baptist Church, St. David's Methodist Church at Craig-y-Don, the Coptic Orthodox Church of Saint Mary and Saint Abasikhiron and Eglwys Unedig Gymraeg Llandudno (the United Welsh Church of Llandudno). There is also a Christadelphian meeting hall in the town.

A member of the local Methodist community is Roger Roberts, now Lord Roberts of Llandudno, Liberal Democrat Spokesman for International Development in the House of Lords.

Llandudno is home to a Jewish centre in Church Walks, which serves local and visiting Jews – one of few in North Wales. There is also a Buddhist centre, Kalpa Bhadra, on Mostyn Avenue in Craig-y-Don.

== Sport ==
The town is host to Llandudno F.C., who currently compete in Cymru North, the second tier of Welsh football; the team have competed previously in the top level Cymru Premier division. The club plays its home matches at Maesdu Park and competed in the Europa League in 2016. Llandudno Albion currently play in the third tier of Welsh football and Llandudno Amateurs play in the fourth tier.

A football club is mentioned in Llandudno as far back as 1865. Gloddaeth Rovers dated back to 1878 and played for a decade; they were then replaced by Llandudno Swifts as the town's main club. Following the demise of Swifts in 1901, a new club called Llandudno Amateurs were formed; a different team to that which exists now.

The annual Welsh Open snooker tournament has been held in February at Venue Cymru since 2023.

Llandudno Rugby Club plays in the town and was established in 1952. It is a member of the Welsh Rugby Union.

There are also local pool, snooker and dominoes tournaments.

The third stage of the Tour of Britain Women's cycle race passed through Llandudno in 2026.

== Demographics ==
The 2011 census counted 20,701 usual residents of which 50.8% were born in Wales and 40.7% in England.

The population in 2021, according to the census, decreased to 19,700. 30% of the population are aged 65+, higher than the national average of 21.3%. The largest ethnic group is White with 95.9% of the population, higher than the national average of 93.8%, with the second largest being Asian/Asian British at 1.8%, lower than the national average of 2.9%. The largest religious group is Christianity who make up 52.6% of the population, higher than the national average of 43.6%, with the second largest being No religion who make up 38.4% of the population, lower than the national average of 46.5%.

== Governance ==
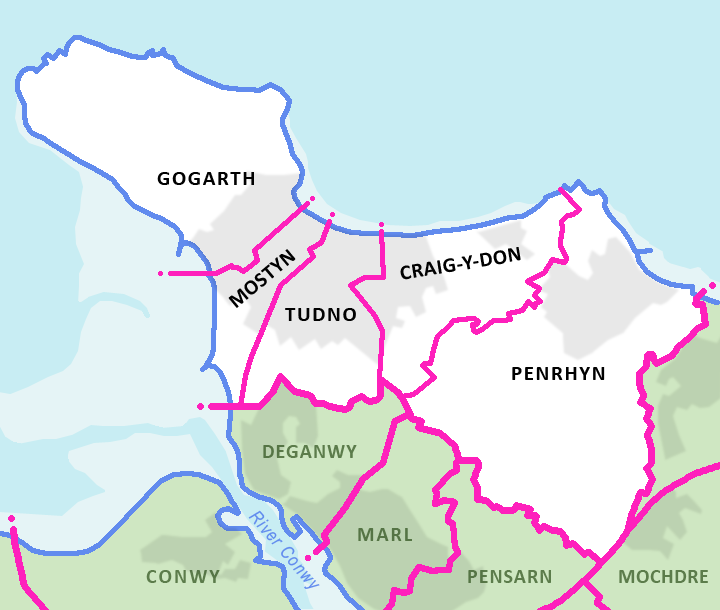
Electoral wards of Llandudno

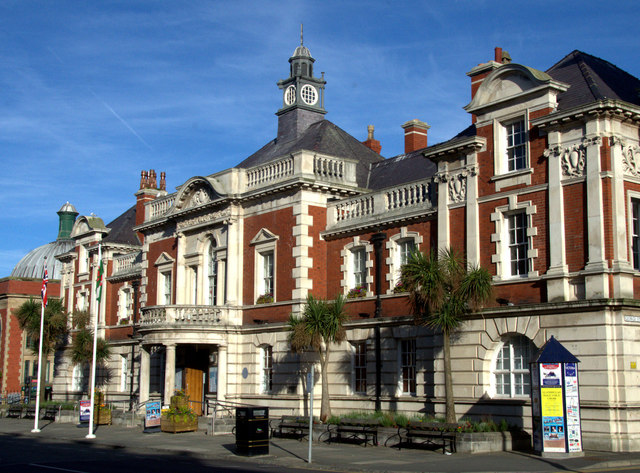
Llandudno Town Hall

There are two tiers of local government covering Llandudno, at community (town) level and principal area (county borough) level: Llandudno Town Council and Conwy County Borough Council. The town council is based at Llandudno Town Hall on Lloyd Street. Llandudno is now divided into five electoral wards: Craig-y-Don, Gogarth, Mostyn, Penrhyn and Tudno. The wards elect county councillors to Conwy County Borough Council and four community councillors each to Llandudno Town Council.

=== Administrative history ===
Llandudno was an ancient parish. In 1854 Llandudno was made an Improvement Commissioners District. The district covered part of the parish of Llandudno and part of the neighbouring parish of Eglwys Rhos.

Improvement commissioners districts such as Llandudno were converted into urban districts under the Local Government Act 1894. The 1894 Act also directed that parishes could no longer straddle district boundaries; the parishes of Llandudno and Eglwys Rhos were therefore both reduced to just cover the parts within the urban district; the parts outside the urban district made a separate parish called Penrhyn. A single parish called 'Llandudno-cum-Eglwysrhos' was created in 1905 covering the same area as the urban district. The urban district's name remained 'Llandudno', with 'Llandudno-cum-Eglwysrhos' being the name of the single civil parish the district contained. The urban district and parish were enlarged in 1934 to absorb Penhryn and part of the abolished parish of Llangystennin (the rest of which, around Llandudno Junction, went to the borough of Conwy).

The urban district council built Llandudno Town Hall to serve as its headquarters in 1902. In 1974 the urban district was abolished, with the area becoming a community within the Aberconwy district in the new county of Gwynedd. Further local government reform in 1996 saw the area become part of the principal area of Conwy County Borough.

Llandudno falls under the UK parliamentary constituency of Bangor Aberconwy, which is represented by the Labour MP Claire Hughes, and fell under the Senedd constituency of Aberconwy until 2026 after the 2024 Senedd Reforms. As of the May 2026 election, Llandudno is a part of the larger constituency of Bangor Conwy Môn and is represented by MS Rhun ap Iorwerth (Plaid Cymru), Helen Jenner (Reform UK), Mair Rowlands (PC), Elfed Williams (PC), John Clark (Ref) and Janet Finch-Saunders (Conservative). On the 7th of May 2026, Rhun Ap Iowerth, the leader of Plaid Cymru, was elected to represent this constituency, and was subsequently appointed as First Minister of Wales (Welsh: Prif Weinidog) on the 12th May 2026, ending Labour's century-long electoral dominance in Wales. The results of this election were announced in Venue Cymru in Llandudno on the 8th of May 2026. It falls under the North Wales electoral region.

== Links with Wormhout and Mametz ==
The town council's coat of arms

Llandudno is twinned with the Flemish town of Wormhout 10 miles (16 km) from Dunkirk. It was there that many members of the Llandudno-based 69th Territorial Regiment were ambushed and taken prisoner. Later, at nearby Esquelbecq on 28 May 1940, the prisoners were shot.

The 1st (North Wales) Brigade was headquartered in Llandudno in December 1914 and included a battalion of the Royal Welch Fusiliers, which had been raised and trained in Llandudno. During the 1914–18 war this Brigade, a major part of the 38th Welsh Division, took part in the Battle of the Somme and the Brigade was ordered to take Mametz Wood. Two days of fighting brought about the total destruction of Mametz village by shelling. After the war, the people of Llandudno (including returning survivors from the 38th Welsh Division) contributed generously to the fund for the reconstruction of the village of Mametz.

Llandudno is also twinned with Champery, Switzerland since August 2022.

== Cultural connections ==
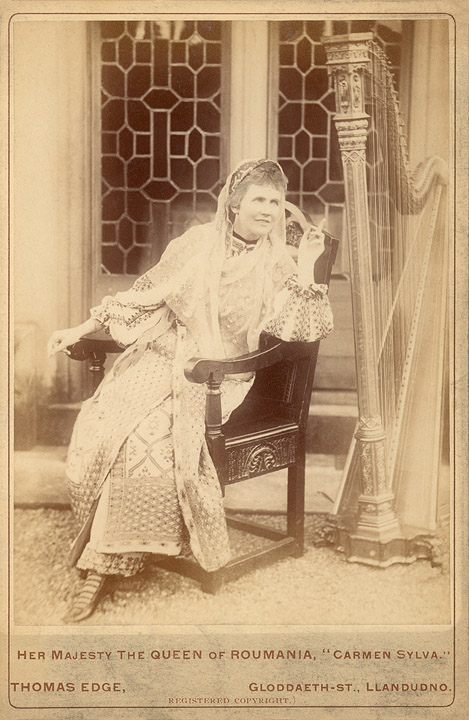
Carmen Sylva, the pseudonym of Queen Elisabeth of Romania, in Llandudno

Llandudno hosted the Welsh National Eisteddfod in 1864, 1896 and 1963, and in 2008 welcomed the Urdd National Eisteddfod to Gloddaeth Isaf Farm, Penrhyn Bay. The town also hosted the Liverpool Olympic Festival in 1865 and 1866.

Matthew Arnold gives a vivid and lengthy description of 1860s Llandudno – and of the ancient tales of Taliesin and Maelgwn Gwynedd that are associated with the local landscape – in the first sections of the preface to On the Study of Celtic Literature (1867). It is also used as a location for dramatic scenes in the stage play and film Hindle Wakes by Stanley Houghton, and the 1911 novel, The Card, by Arnold Bennett, and its subsequent film version.

Elisabeth of Wied, the Queen Consort of Romania and also known as writer Carmen Sylva, stayed in Llandudno for five weeks in 1890. On leaving, she described Wales as "a beautiful haven of peace". Translated into Welsh as "hardd, hafan, hedd", it became the town's official motto.

Other famous people with links to Llandudno include the Victorian statesman John Bright and multi-capped Welsh international footballers Neville Southall, Neil Eardley, Chris Maxwell and Joey Jones. Australia's 7th Prime Minister Billy Hughes attended school in Llandudno. Gordon Borrie QC (Baron Borrie), Director General of the Office of Fair Trading from 1976 to 1992, was educated at the town's John Bright Grammar School when he lived there as a wartime evacuee.

The international art gallery Oriel Mostyn is in Vaughan Street next to the post office. It was built in 1901 to house the art collection of Lady Augusta Mostyn. It was requisitioned in 1914 for use as an army drill hall and later became a warehouse, before being returned to use as an art gallery in 1979. Following a major revamp the gallery was renamed simply 'Mostyn' in 2010.

Llandudno has its own mini arts festival, LLAWN (Llandudno Arts Weekend). The festival takes place over three days of the weekend in late September, originally conceived as a way to promote the town during the lull in the tourism season.

== Notable people ==
See Category:People from Llandudno

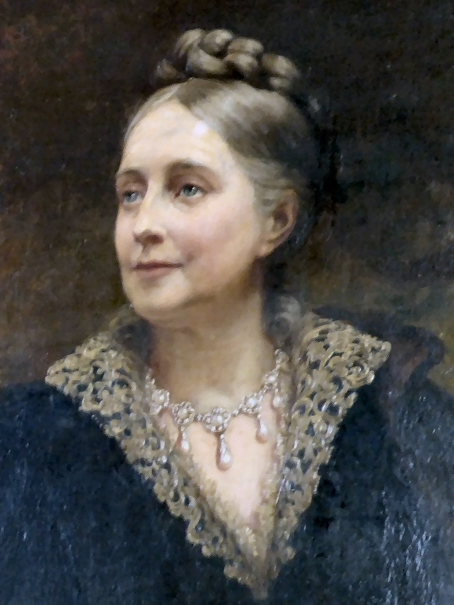
Augusta Mostyn

- Augusta Mostyn (1830–1912) philanthropist and photographer, lived in Gloddaeth Hall
- Martha Hughes Cannon (1857–1932) a Utah State Senator, physician, women's rights advocate and suffragist
- Dion Fortune (1890–1946) occultist, ceremonial magician, novelist and author
- Margaret Lacey (1911–1988) character actress and ballet teacher
- Sylvia Sleigh (1916–2010) naturalised American realist painter, worked in New York City
- Glyn Griffiths (1917–1983) flying ace with the Royal Air Force during the Second World War
- Peter Brinson (1920–1995) writer and lecturer on dance
- Jeremy Brooks (1926–1994) novelist, poet and dramatist, evacuated to Llandudno
- Roger Roberts, Baron Roberts of Llandudno (born 1935) politician and Methodist minister
- Ben Johnson (born 1946) painter of detailed cityscapes
- Tony Bastable (1944-2007) the Patron Saint of Llandudno according to the Half Man Half Biscuit song "I Love You Because (You Look Like Jim Reeves)"

=== Sport ===
- Joey Jones (1955–2025) football full-back with 594 club caps and 72 for Wales
- Neville Southall (born 1958) footballer with 710 club caps and 92 for Wales
- Neal Eardley (born 1988) footballer with over 400 club caps and 16 for Wales

== Freedom of the Town ==
The following people and military units have received the Freedom of the Town of Llandudno.

=== Individuals ===
- Neville Southall: September 1993.
- Philip Evans: January 2002
- Terence Davies: 16 April 2018.

=== Military units ===
- RAF Valley: September 1995.
- Llandudno Lifeboat Station, RNLI: January 2002.
- 203 (Welsh) Field Hospital (Volunteers) RAMC: 19 September 2009.
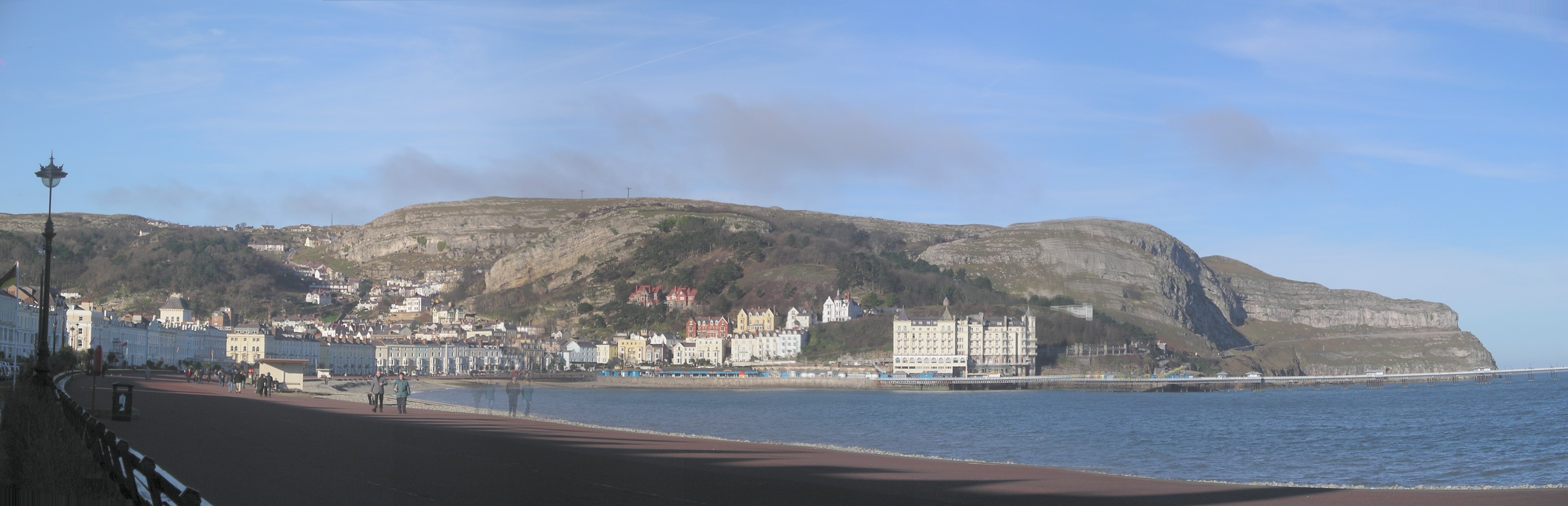
Llandudno's North Shore with the Great Orme behind

== Bibliography ==
- Ivor Wynne Jones. Llandudno Queen of Welsh Resorts Landmark, Ashbourne Derbyshire 2002 ISBN 1-84306-048-5
- Philip C. Evans. "Llandudno Coast Artillery School" Llandudno Town Council 2011
