= Karoline Leach =

British playwright and author

- Born: 20 July 1967 (age 59); Liverpool, UK
- Occupation: Writer
- Writing career
- Period: Early 21st century
- Genres: Biography, stageplays

Karoline Leach (born 20 July 1967) is a British playwright and author, best known for her book In the Shadow of the Dreamchild (ISBN 0-7206-1044-3), which re-examines the life of Lewis Carroll (pseudonym of Charles Lutwidge Dodgson), the author of Alice's Adventures in Wonderland. This book and her subsequent work on what she terms the "Carroll Myth" have been major sources of upheaval and controversy in recent years and she has produced very polarized responses from Carroll scholars and lay enthusiasts.

Leach was born in Liverpool. She studied acting and worked as both actress and director in British theatre before becoming a writer.

== Theatre work ==
Her first professional produced work as a writer was an adaptation of Hans Christian Andersen's The Snow Queen, commissioned by Orchard Theatre Company in 1989. "The Mysterious Mr Love" was produced in London's West End in 1997. Under the new title of Tryst that play opened off-Broadway at the Promenade Theatre, on 6 April 2006, and has subsequently been produced in many cities around the world, including Athens, Warsaw, Houston, Los Angeles and Montreal.

== The Carroll controversy ==
Leach's theory of a "Carroll Myth" created a furore when first suggested, and continues to divide scholars, though has gained the support of authors such as Carolyn Siger. Authors including Morton N. Cohen and Martin Gardner downplayed or dismissed her importance. Cohen, who was also a Dodgson biographer, repudiated Leach's position as being simply a plea for the defence, and, in a 2003 article in the Times Literary Supplement, labelled Leach and her supporters as "revisionists" attempting to rewrite history.

In 2004, Leach founded the Association for New Lewis Carroll Studies, that aims to promote reassessment of Carroll's life in light of the alleged 'Myth'. Its membership, as of 2010, includes scholars such as Hugues Lebailly, Carolyn Sigler, Sherry L. Ackerman, John Tufail and Cristopher Hollingsworth.
