= District of Aberconwy =

Former district of Gwynedd, Wales

Aberconwy
- Borough
- Area
  - Coordinates: 53.28418°N 3.83194°W
- History
  - Created: 1 April 1974
  - Abolished: 31 March 1996
  - Succeeded by: Conwy County Borough
  - HQ: Conwy
- Contained within
  - County Council: Gwynedd

The Borough of Aberconwy was a local government district with borough status from 1974 to 1996, being one of five districts in the county of Gwynedd, north-west Wales.

== History ==
The borough was created on 1 April 1974, under the Local Government Act 1972. It covered parts of nine former districts from the administrative counties of Caernarfonshire and Denbighshire, which were all abolished at the same time:

- Betws-y-Coed Urban District
- Conwy Municipal Borough
- Eglwysbach parish from Hiraethog Rural District‡
- Llanddoget parish from Hiraethog Rural District‡
- Llandudno Urban District
- Llanrwst Urban District‡
- Llanrwst Rural parish from Hiraethog Rural District‡
- Llanfairfechan Urban District
- Llansantffraid Glan Conway parish from Aled Rural District‡
- Nant Conwy Rural District
- Penmaenmawr Urban District
- Tir Ifan parish from Hiraethog Rural District‡

‡From Denbighshire (rest from Caernarfonshire)

The new district was named Aberconwy, meaning mouth of the River Conwy, with the same name being used in both Welsh and English.

Under the Local Government (Wales) Act 1994, the previous two tier system of counties and districts was replaced with new principal areas (each designated either a "county" or a "county borough"), whose councils perform the functions previously divided between the county and district councils. The Aberconwy area merged with the neighbouring Colwyn district from the county of Clwyd to become a county borough which the government originally named "Aberconwy and Colwyn". During the transition to the new system, the shadow authority requested a change of name from "Aberconwy and Colwyn" to "Conwy". The government confirmed the change with effect from 2 April 1996, one day after the new council came into being.

The pre-1996 counties of Wales continued to be used for some ceremonial purposes such as lieutenancy, being called preserved counties. The new Conwy County Borough therefore initially straddled the preserved counties of Gwynedd and Clwyd. In 2003 the area of the former Aberconwy district was moved from the preserved county of Gwynedd to Clwyd, uniting Conwy County Borough within the preserved county Clwyd.

== Political control ==
The first election to the council was held in 1973, initially operating as a shadow authority alongside the outgoing authorities until it came into its powers on 1 April 1974. Political control of the council from 1974 until its abolition in 1996 was as follows:

| Party in control | Years |
|---|---|
| Independent | 1974–1983 |
| No overall control | 1983–1996 |

== Premises ==
The council was based at Bodlondeb, a large house built in 1877 on Bangor Road in Conwy, which had served as the main offices of the old Conwy Borough Council since 1937. The council also maintained additional offices at Llandudno Town Hall, which had been built in 1902 for the former Llandudno Urban District Council. After Aberconwy's abolition in 1996, Bodlondeb became the headquarters of the replacement Conwy County Borough Council.
