= Hugues Lebailly =

French academic

Hugues Lebailly is a French academic and Senior Lecturer in English Cultural Studies at the Sorbonne. He is known for his work on nineteenth-century English literature, particularly his studies of Lewis Carroll which, in combination with the work of Karoline Leach and others, have begun a reassessment of Carroll's life and personality. His work on Carroll's place within what he has termed the "Victorian Child-Cult" has helped shape a new understanding of the man's sexuality and his artistry.

His publications include:

- 'Dr Dodgson et Mr Carroll: de la caricature au portrait.' ('Dr. Dodgson and Mr. Carroll: from Caricature to Portrait.') Cahiers Victoriens et Edouardiens n° 43, April 1996, Presses Universitaires de Montpellier.
- 'The Powerful and the Sweet:dialectique du masculin et du féminin dans la critique d'art victorienne'. ('The Dialectics of Masculinity and Femininity in Victorian Art Criticism.') Masculin/Féminin, Littératures et cultures anglo-saxonnes, proceedings of the 38th Congress of the S.A.E.S. Presses Universitaires de Rennes, May 1999 (pp. 151–163).
- 'Ordering disorder: la fonction normative de la critique d'art victorienne.' ('Ordering Disorder: the Normative Function of Victorian Art Criticism.') Littérature et Ordre Social, proceedings of the second International Congress of the University of Le Havre, headed by Jean-Paul Barbiche: Paris, l'Harmattan, 1999 (pp. 73–83).
- 'C. L. Dodgson and the Victorian Cult of the Child', The Carrollian, The Lewis Carroll Journal n° 4, autumn 1999 (pp. 3–31).
- Through a Distorting Looking-Glass: Charles Lutwidge Dodgson's artistic interests as mirrored in his nieces' edited version of his diaries'
- Charles Lutwidge Dodgson's relationship with the weaker and more aesthetic sex re-examined
