= Morton N. Cohen =

Canadian-born American author and scholar (1921–2017)

Morton Norton Cohen (27 February 1921 – 12 June 2017) was a Canadian-born American author and scholar who was a professor at City University of New York. He is best known for his studies of children's author Lewis Carroll including the 1995 biography Lewis Carroll: A Biography.

== Life ==
Morton Norton Cohen was born on 27 February 1921 in Calgary, Alberta. His family moved to Montreal, Quebec, and then to Revere, Massachusetts. He taught English at West Virginia University, Syracuse University, Rutgers University and the City College and the Graduate Center of the City University of New York. In addition to his work on Charles Dodgson, he produced studies of Henry Rider Haggard, Rudyard Kipling and other Victorian subjects, as well as children's literature, travel articles and fiction. He was elected a fellow of the Royal Society of Literature in 1996. The Modern Language Association set up the biennial Morton N. Cohen Award for a Distinguished Edition of Letters in 1989. The first award was given in 1991. Under the terms of the award, the "winning collection will be one that provides readers with a clear, accurate, and readable text; necessary background information; and succinct and eloquent introductory material and annotations. The edited collection should be in itself a work of literature."

Cohen died on 12 June 2017 in Manhattan, New York.

== Selected works ==
- H. Rider Haggard, His Life and Works – PhD thesis, Columbia University, issued 1958 in microfilm
- Rider Haggard: His Life and Works (London: Hutchinson, 1960)
- Rudyard Kipling to Rider Haggard: The Record of a Friendship (Hutchinson, 1965)
- The Letters of Lewis Carroll, 2 vols., ed. Cohen with the assistance of Roger Lancelyn Green (Oxford University Press, 1979)
- Lewis Carroll, Photographer of Children: Four Nude Studies (Rosenbach Foundation/Clarkson N. Potter, 1979)
- Lewis Carroll and the Kitchins (Argosy Bookstore, 1980)
- Lewis Carroll and Alice 1832-1982 (Pierpont Morgan Library, 1982)
- The Selected Letters of Lewis Carroll, edited by Cohen (London: Macmillan, 1982); (London: Papermac, 1996)
- Lewis Carroll and the House of Macmillan, ed. Cohen and Anita Gandolfo (Cambridge University Press, 1987)
- Lewis Carroll: Interviews and Recollections, ed. Cohen (University of Iowa Press, 1989)
- Lewis Carroll: A Biography (Macmillan, 1995)
- Reflections in a Looking Glass: A Centennial Celebration of Lewis Carroll, Photographer (New York: Aperture, 1998)
- Lewis Carroll & His Illustrators: Collaborations and Correspondence, 1865–1898, ed. Cohen and Edward Wakeling (Macmillan, 2003)
