= A. B. Frost =

American illustrator, graphic artist, painter and comics writer

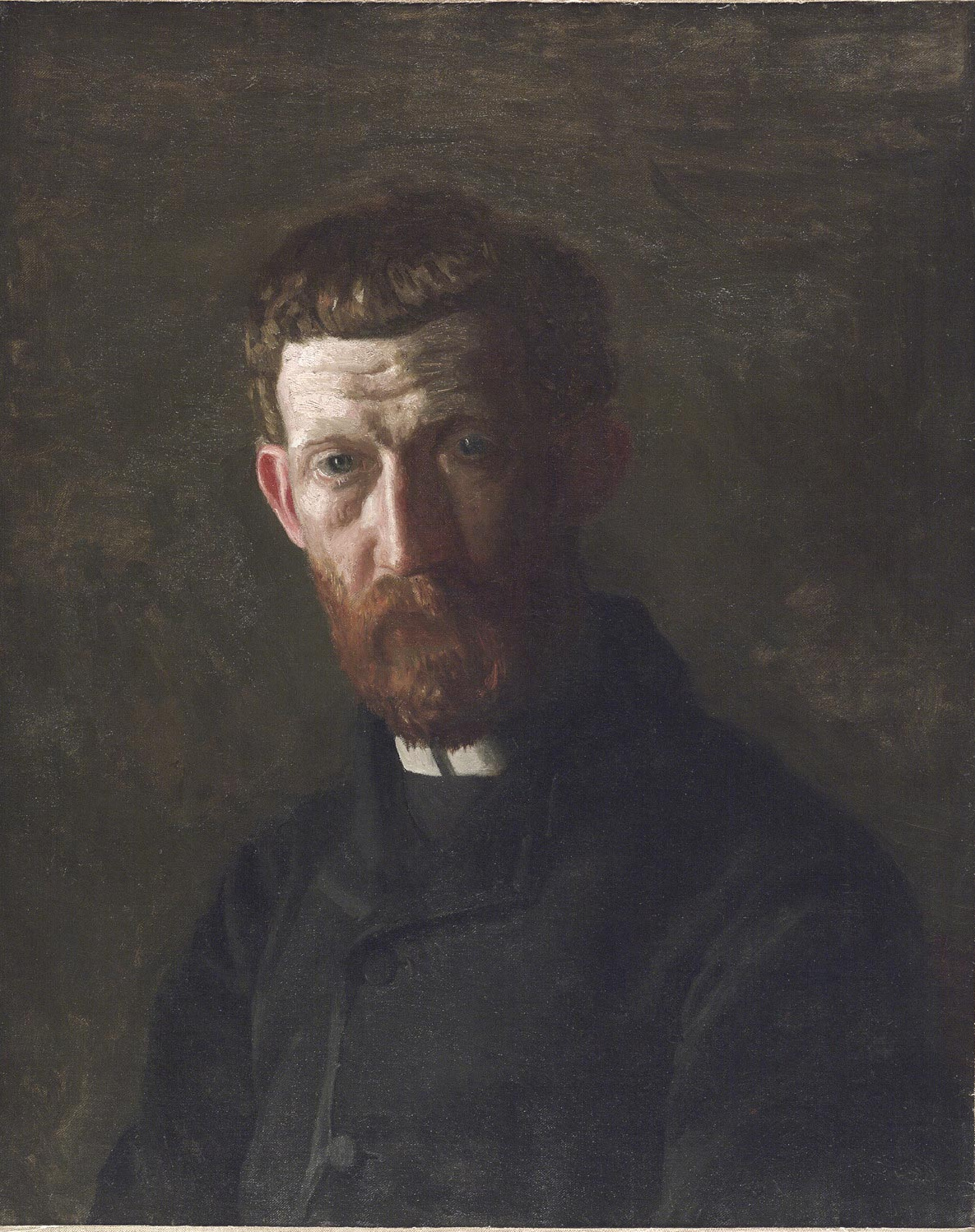
- Portrait of A.B. Frost by Thomas Eakins
- Born: January 17, 1851; Philadelphia, Pennsylvania, U.S.
- Died: June 22, 1928 (aged 77); Pasadena, California, U.S.
- Resting place: Laurel Hill Cemetery, Philadelphia, Pennsylvania, U.S.
- Education: Pennsylvania Academy of the Fine Arts
- Known for: Comics, graphic art, lithography, painting

Arthur Burdett Frost (January 17, 1851 – June 22, 1928), usually cited as A. B. Frost, was an American illustrator, graphic artist, painter and comics writer. He is best known for his illustrations of Br'er Rabbit and other characters in the Joel Chandler Harris' Uncle Remus books.

Frost's work is known for its dynamic representation of motion and sequence and for his realistic hunting, shooting and golfing prints. He illustrated over 90 books, produced hundreds of paintings and was a pioneer in the development of comic strips. He was admitted posthumously to the Society of Illustrators' Hall of Fame in 1985.

== Career ==
Frost was born January 17, 1851, in Philadelphia, Pennsylvania, the eldest of ten children. His father, John Frost, was a historian, biographer and literature professor. At the age of fifteen, he worked as an intern at a local business that taught him engraving and lithography. He was mostly self taught but did study under Thomas Eakins at the Pennsylvania Academy of Fine Arts, with Gilbert Tucker Margeson in Massachusetts and with William Merritt Chase at the Shinnecock Hills Summer School of Art. In 1874 he was asked by a friend to illustrate a book of humorous short stories, "Out of the Hurly Burly", by Charles Heber Clark, which was a commercial success and launched his illustration career.

In 1875, he worked at The Daily Graphic. In 1876, Frost joined the art department at the publisher Harper & Brothers, where he worked with well-known illustrators including Howard Pyle, E. W. Kemble, Frederic Remington and C. S. Reinhart. He published illustrations in other magazines such as Harper's Weekly, Punch and Scribner's. While there, he learned a wide variety of techniques, from cartooning to what later came to be called photorealistic painting. He moved to London in 1877 to study art and work. He was one of the first American illustrators to have success in England when he worked on illustrations for Mark Twain and Charles Dickens. He returned to Philadelphia and studied under painters Thomas Eakins and William Merritt Chase at the Pennsylvania Academy of the Fine Arts.

In 1892, Frost partnered with Joel Chandler Harris and included his drawings of Uncle Remus and Brer Rabbit and other characters into the book Uncle Remus and His Friend. Frost and Harris published several additional versions of the Uncle Remus books including Uncle Remus: His Songs and Sayings in 1895 and 1898.

Frost was influenced by the serial photography work of Eadward Muybridge and translated his photographic approach to create successive illustration panels and dialogue which was a pioneering form of comic strips and comic books. In 1884, Frost published Stuff and Nonsense, an anthology of his works that advanced the concept of time-stop drawings and contained other innovations. Although he was never published in newspapers, Frost's work was influential on newspaper comic strip illustrators such as Rudolph Dirks and Jimmy Swinnerton.

Frost incorporated his interest in hunting, shooting and golf into multiple illustrations and publications. He was an avid golfer and a member of the Morris County Golf Club in Morristown, New Jersey, during the initial uptake of the sport in the United States. His sketches of golf players focused on the drama and passion of the players set in detailed backgrounds. His golf illustrations were included in The Golfer's Alphabet (1898), The Epic of Golf (1923) and on two covers of Collier's magazine.

He was a member of the Philadelphia Sketch Club, the Society of Independent Artists and the Society of Illustrators.

== Personal life ==
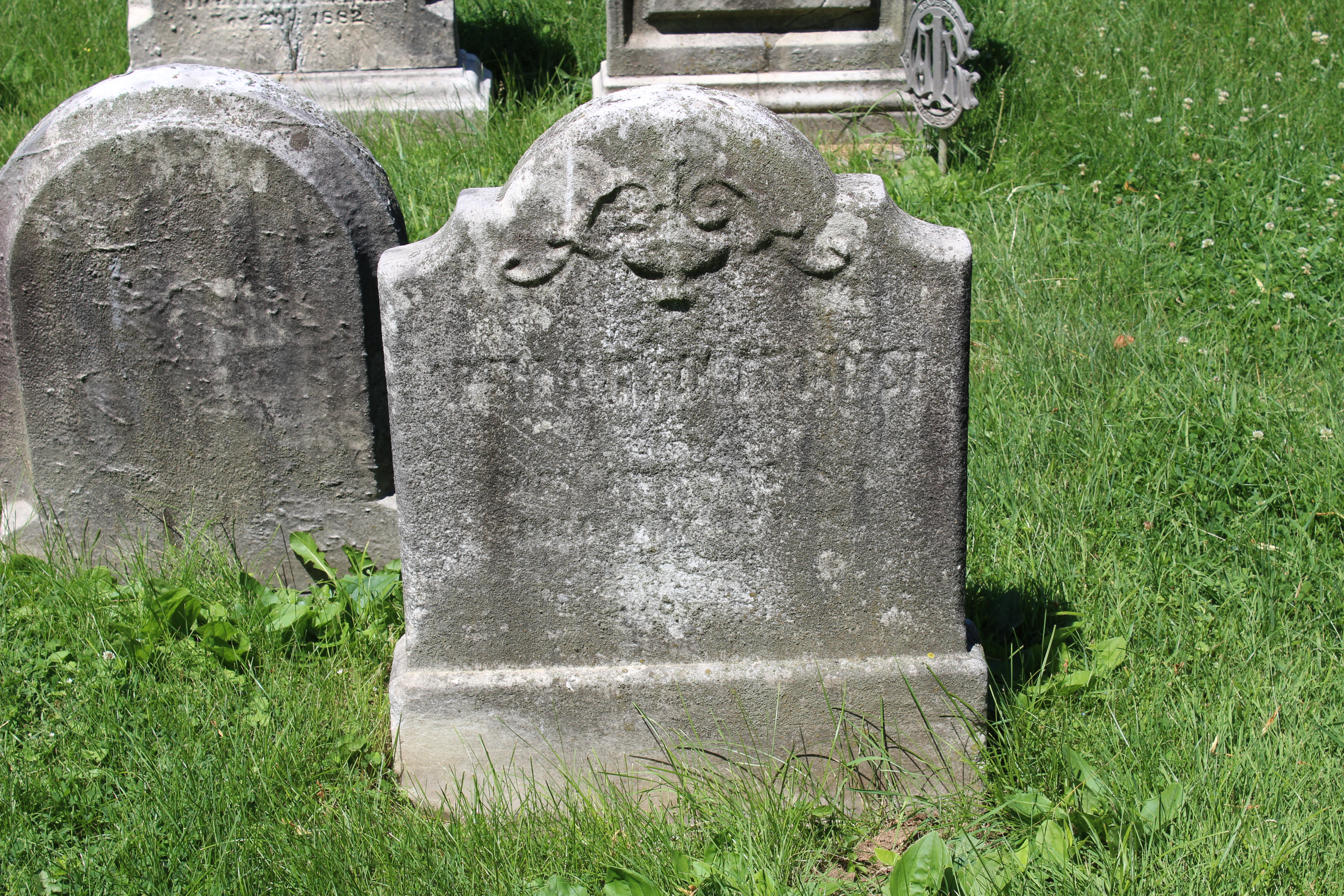
A.B. Frost tombstone in Laurel Hill Cemetery

Frost married another artist, illustrator Emily Louise Phillips, in 1883. He lived at Boisaubin Manor in Convent Station, New Jersey until 1908. From 1908 until May 1916, Frost and his family lived in Paris to allow his children to study art. After his return to the United States, he lived in New Jersey and Pennsylvania and worked as an illustrator and comics artist, mainly for Life magazine. In 1924, Frost moved to Pasadena, California and died there on June 22, 1928. He is interred at Laurel Hill Cemetery in Philadelphia in Section C, plot 63.

== Legacy ==
He was admitted posthumously into the Society of Illustration Hall of Fame in 1985. His depiction of Brer Rabbit from the Tales of Uncle Remus books was included on a commemorative stamp in 2001.

== Gallery ==
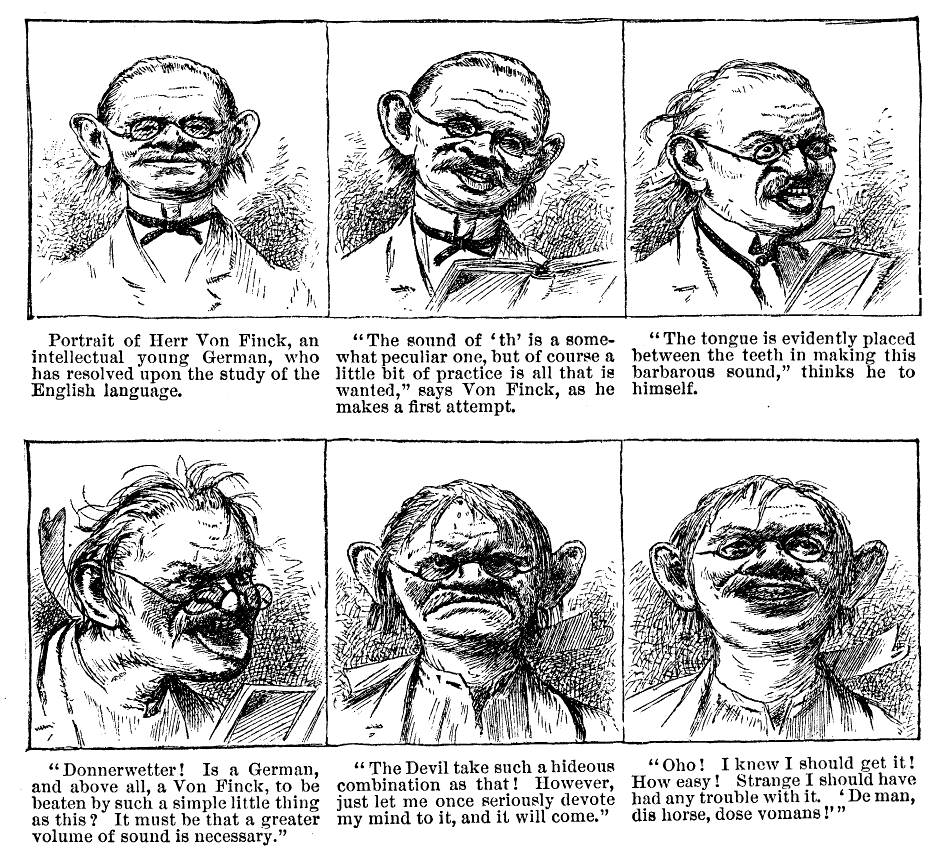
A. B. Frost's first comic: a German attempts to pronounce English-language "th" sounds, December 1897

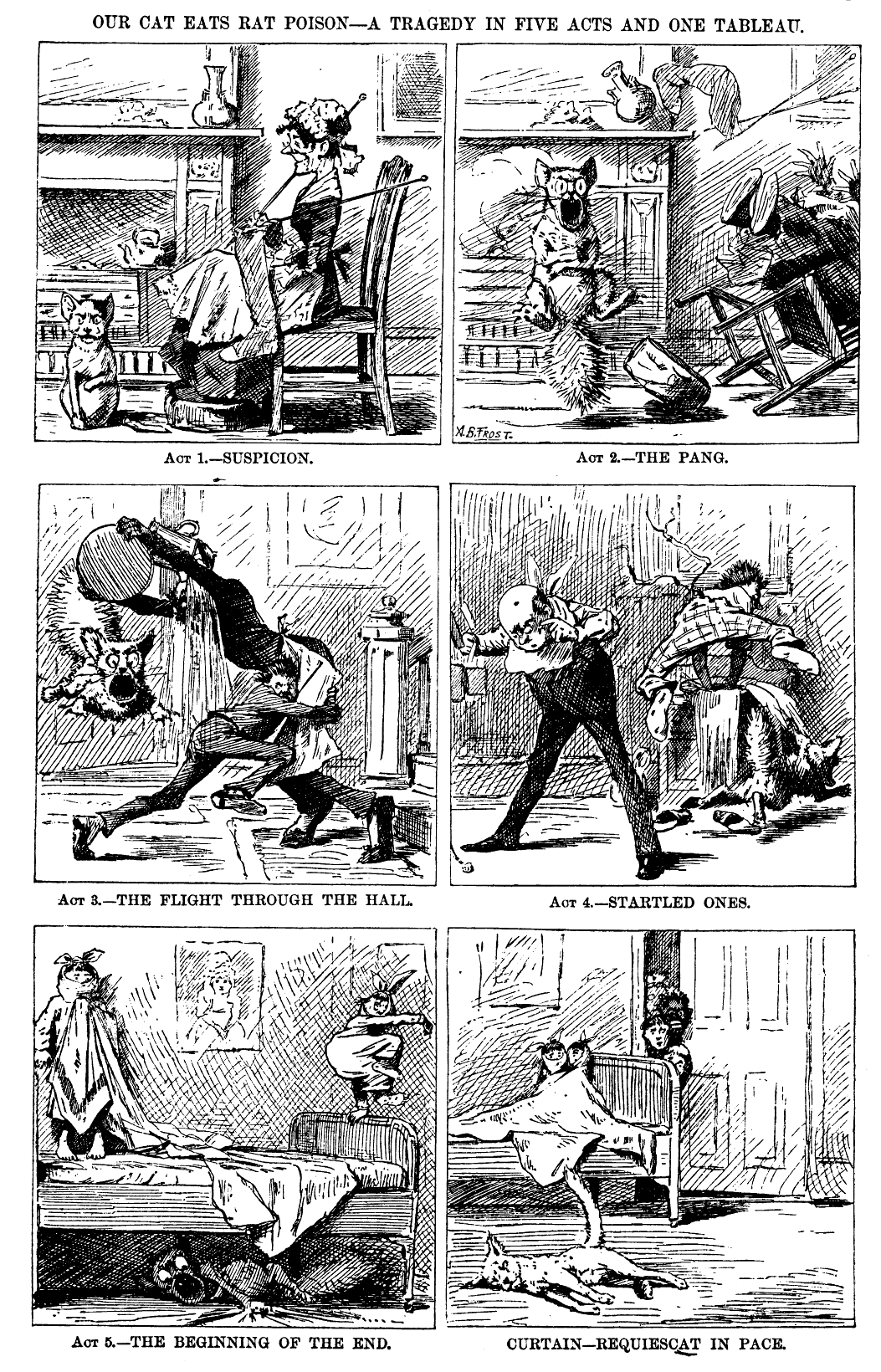
Our Cat Eats Rat Poison (titled Fatal Mistake in later editions)

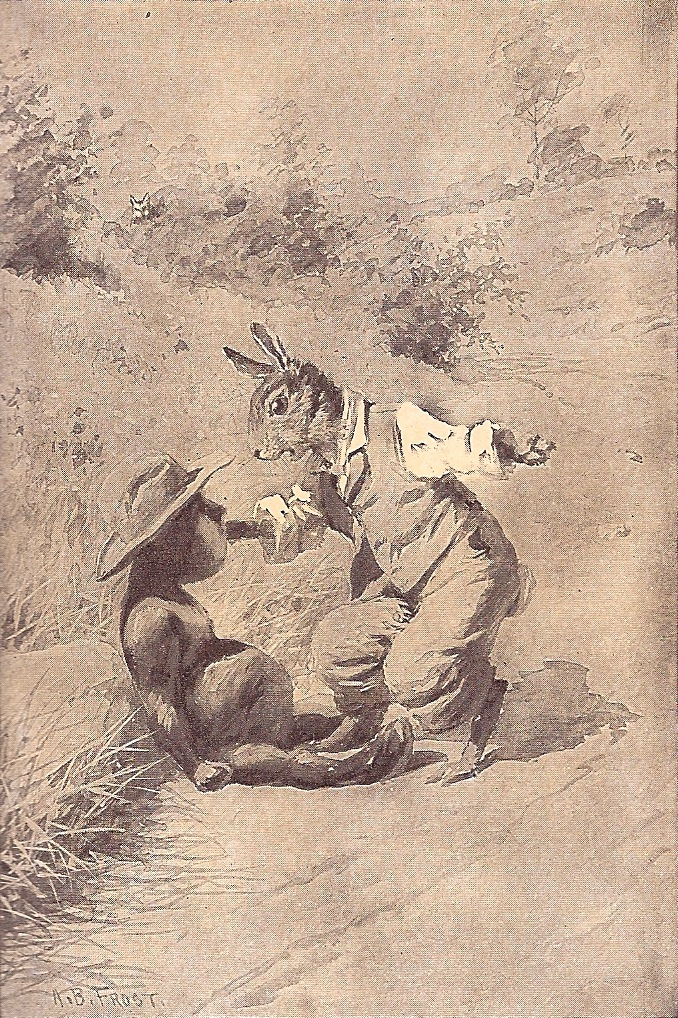
Brer Rabbit and the Tar Baby from the 1895 version of Uncle Remus: His Songs and Sayings

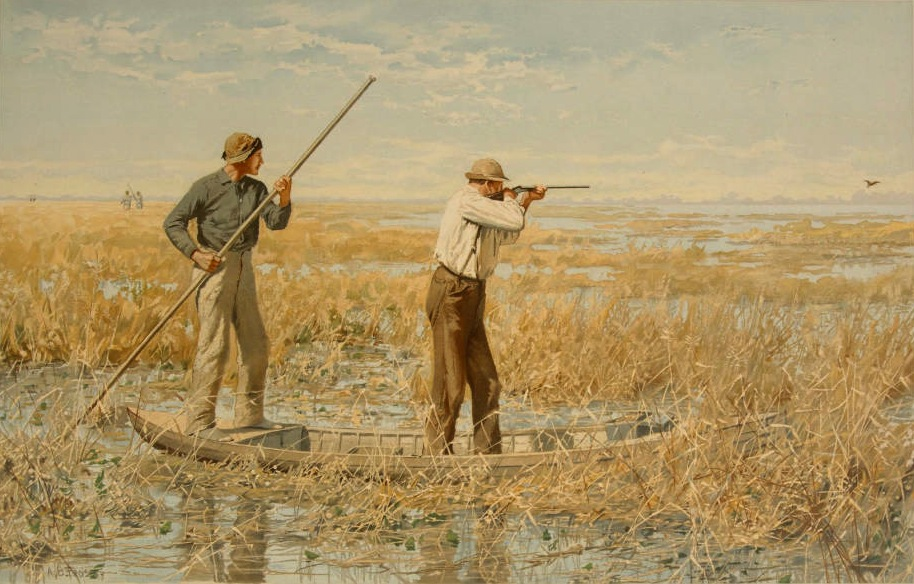
Rail Shooting, by A B Frost from Shooting Pictures, by Scribner & Sons (1895)

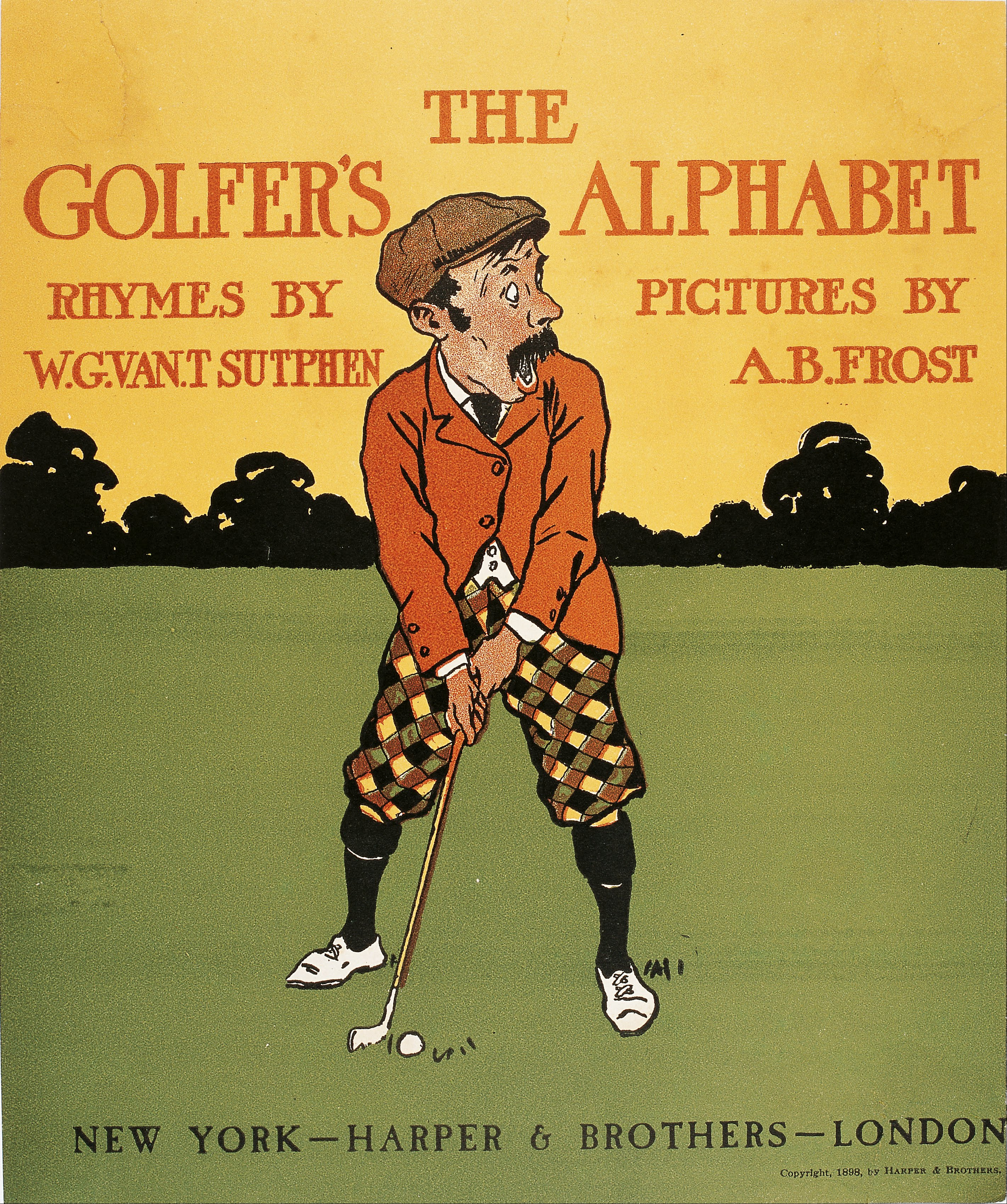
Front Cover of The Golfer's Alphabet (1898)

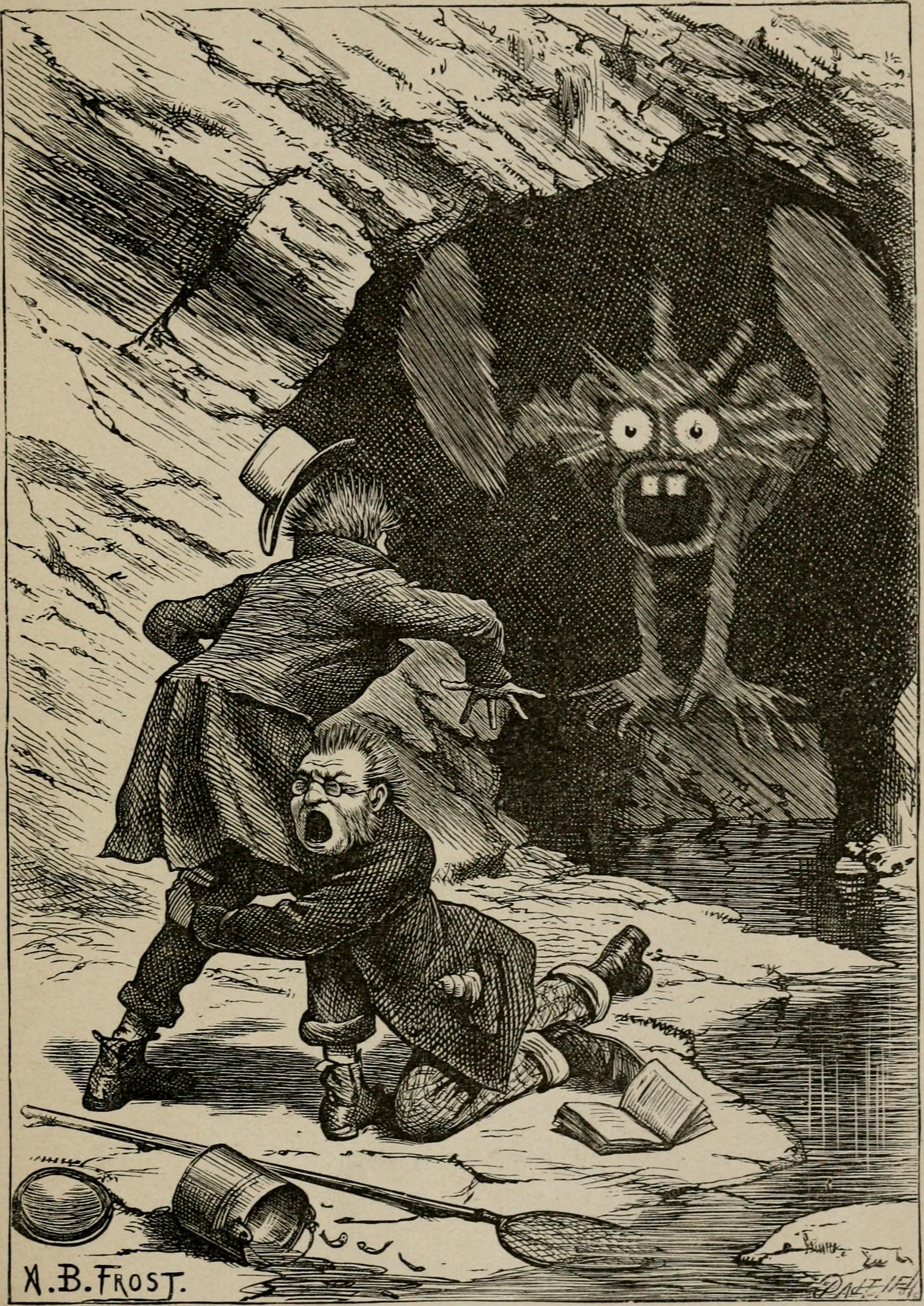
Illustration from Lewis Caroll's Rhyme? and Reason?

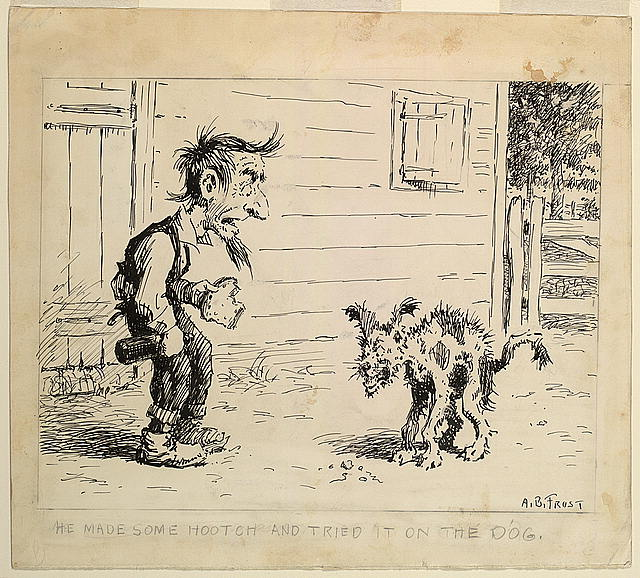
A 1921 illustration by Frost

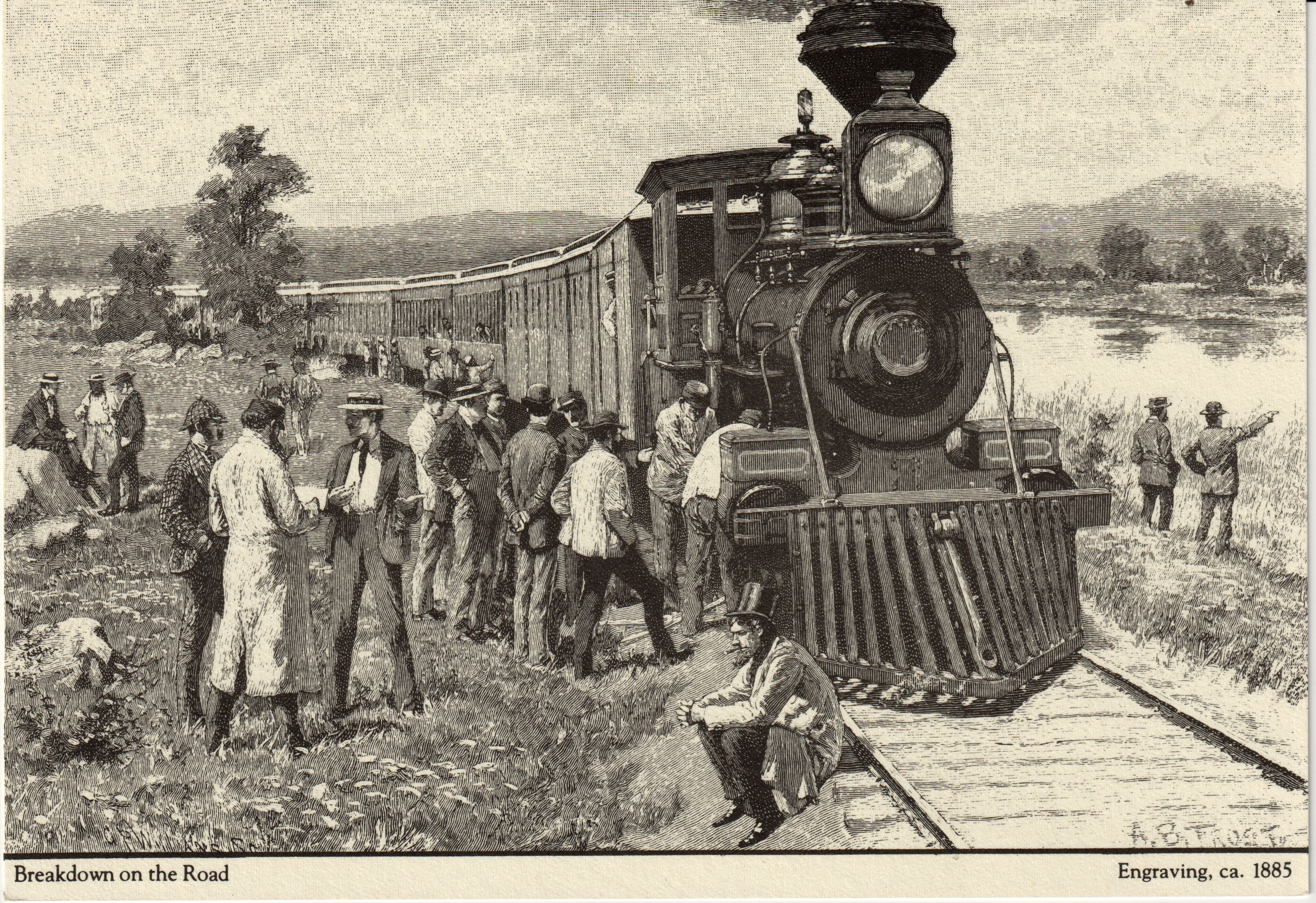
Breakdown on the Road, 1885

== Partial list of works ==
- Out of the Hurly Burly, illustrations (1874)
- Rhyme? And Reason?, by Lewis Carroll (1883)
- Rudder Grange, by Frank R. Stockton (1885)
- A Tangled Tale, by Lewis Carroll (1885)
- Our Cat Eats Rat Poison (titled Fatal Mistake in later editions) (July 1881 in Issue #374 Harper's Magazine)
- Stuff and Nonsense, anthology (1884)
- The Moral Pirates by W.L. Alden (1887)
- The Bull Calf and Other Tales, anthology (1892)
- Uncle Remus and His Friends, by Joel Chandler Harris (1892)
- The Story of a Bad Boy by Thomas Bailey Aldrich (1895)
- Tom Sawyer, Detective by Mark Twain (1896)
- The Associate Hermits by Frank R. Stockton (1898)
- Uncle Remus: His Songs and His Sayings by Joel Chandler Harris (1898)
- Sports and Games in the Open (1899)
- The Chronicles of Aunt Minervy Ann, by Joel Chandler Harris (1899)
- The Golfer's Alphabet, Harper & Brothers, New York and London, (1899)
- A Book of Drawings, P.F. Collier & Son, New York (1904)
- Carlo (1912)
- The Epic of Golf, by Clinton Scollard (1923)
