= Phantasmagoria (poem) =

1869 poem by Lewis Carroll

"Phantasmagoria" is a poem written by Lewis Carroll and first published in 1869 as the opening poem of a collection of verse by Carroll entitled Phantasmagoria and Other Poems. The collection was also published under the name Rhyme? And Reason? It is Lewis Carroll's longest poem. Both the poem and the collection were illustrated by A. B. Frost.

== Synopsis ==
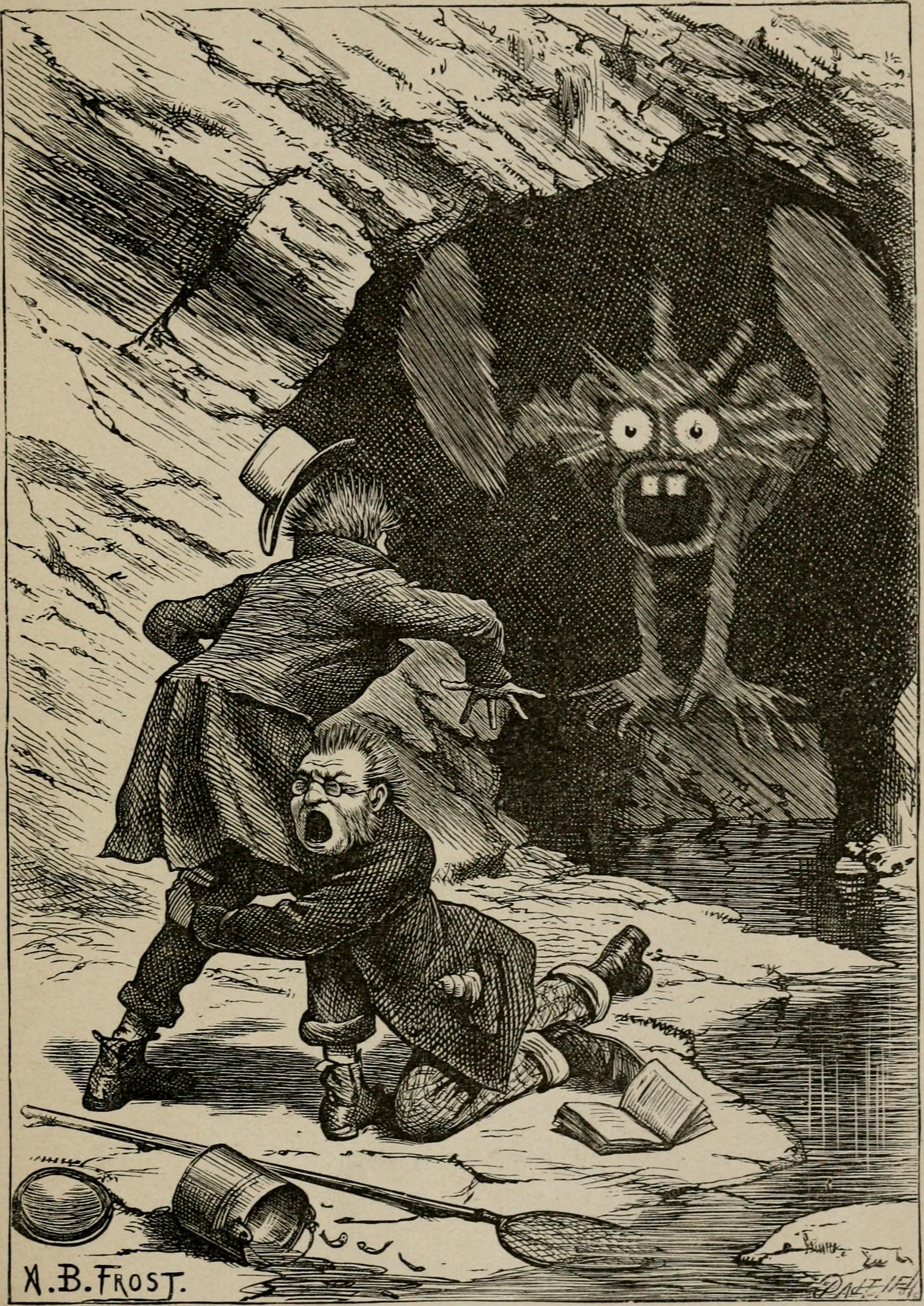
Illustration by A. B. Frost

"Phantasmagoria" is a narrative discussion written in seven cantos between a ghost (a Phantom) and a man named Tibbets. Carroll portrays the ghost as not so different from human beings: although ghosts may jibber and jangle their chains, they, like us, simply have a job to do and that job is to haunt. Just as in our society, in ghost society there is a hierarchy, and ghosts are answerable to the King (who must be addressed as “Your Royal Whiteness”) if they disregard the "Maxims of Behaviour”.

Ghosts, our Phantom tells the narrator, fear the same things that we often fear, only sometimes in reverse:

“And as to being in a fright,
Allow me to remark
That Ghosts have just as good a right,
In every way, to fear the light,
As Men to fear the dark.”

== The Cantos ==
Phantasmagoria is divided into seven cantos which are named:

Canto 1. The Trystyng
Canto 2. Hys Fyve Rules
Canto 3. Scarmoges
Canto 4. Hys Nouryture
Canto 5. Byckerment
Canto 6. Dyscomfyture
Canto 7. Sad Souvenaunce

=== Canto 1. The Trystyng ===
The Trystyng is the meeting between the ghost and the narrator in which they become acquainted. The narrator has come home one evening to find something "white and wavy" in his dimly lit room. Hearing a sneeze, he addresses the Phantom, a shy creature who has caught a cold, he says, “out there upon the landing”. The cordial exchange allays the narrator's apprehensions, the narrator's hospitality is appreciated by the ghost, and a conversation ensues.

The ghost explains that the number of ghosts any house can accommodate is variable: some houses have more than one ghost, but this is a "one-ghost" house. He describes the ghosts' hierarchy:

A Spectre has first choice, by right,
In filling up a vacancy;
Then Phantom, Goblin, Elf, and Sprite –
If all these fail them, they invite
The nicest Ghoul that they can see.

=== Canto 2. Hys Fyve Rules ===
Here he describes the Five Good Rules of Etiquette that ghosts are required to obey.

==== Rule 1 ====
Let the “Victim” (all hauntees are referred to as “victims”) begin the conversation: “No ghost of any common sense/Begins a conversation” (p. 12). Instead, the ghost should initiate a haunting by waving curtains or rattling a door. Should the victim take no heed, then the ghost tells him, “You’ll know the thing's a failure" (p. 12).

==== Rule 2 ====
In a "ceremonious" call, "First burn a blue or crimson light...then scratch the door or walls" (p. 14).

==== Rule 3 ====
Ghosts are required to "Protect / the interests of the Victim...To treat him with a grave respect, / And not to contradict him".

The narrator says he has encountered ghosts who forget the third rule, to which the ghost suggests that perhaps “you first transgressed” by treating the ghost rudely:

If you address a Ghost as 'Thing!'
Or strike him with a hatchet,
He is permitted by the King
To drop all formal parleying –
And then you're sure to catch it!

==== Rule 4 ====
Ghosts must not trespass where other ghosts are living, otherwise (unless pardoned by the king) they must “instantly be slaughtered”:

That simply means 'be cut up small':
Ghosts soon unite anew.
The process scarcely hurts at all,
Not more than when you’re what you call
‘Cut up’ by a Review.

==== Rule 5 ====
The king must be addressed as “Sir” and “Your Royal Whiteness” (p. 17).

After reciting his maxims, the ghost is thirsty and requests a glass of beer.

=== Canto 3. Scarmoges ===
The ghost speaks of the different classes of ghosts (Spectres, Elves, Goblins, and more) and their hierarchy, with Elves being “stupid company, you know, For any but themselves” (p. 19). He describes Inspector Kobold of the Spectre order, who spends his time at inns where port is served and is thus known as the “Inn-Spectre” (p. 21). The narrator tolerates the pun, but when the ghost criticises the narrator's house as “neither snug nor spacious” (p. 23), and complains about his host's food, wine, and cigars, the narrator objects angrily:

You’re getting as familiar
As if you were my cousin! (p. 24)

The ghost reacts by throwing a bottle at the narrator, which strikes him in the nose and renders him unconscious for a time. When the narrator awakens, the ghost continues telling his story.

=== Canto 4. Hys Nouryture ===
In Canto IV, the ghost makes a reference to Bradshaw’s Railway Guide (which Carroll had parodied as a young child in his “Guida di Braggia”).

“Oh, when I was a little ghost,
A merry time had we!
Each seated on his favourite post,
We chumped and chawed the buttered toast
They gave us for our tea.”

"That story is in print!" I cried.
"Don’t say it’s not, because
It’s known as well as Bradshaw’s Guide!”
(The ghost uneasily replied
he hardly thought it was.)

Hailing from a long line of ghosts and of the order, the Phantom tells his family tree as such: His father was a Brownie; his mother was a Fairy. The children were of different stripe – there was a Pixy, two Fays, a Banshee, a Fetch and a Kelpie, a Poltergeist and a Ghoul, two Trolls (“which broke the rule”), a Goblin and a Double, then an Elf, a Phantom, and finally, a Leprechaun.

No Spectres, although he notes that when he was a young Phantom some Spectres did call on the family and were “dressed in the usual white" (p. 29). Spectres are the “ghost-nobility” and look upon the rest of the ghost species with disdain and scorn.

The ghost informs us of the ways of ghosts: it’s old-fashioned to groan, and instead now there is the more fashionable squeak – which the narrator tells us "chill[s] me to the bone". (p. 31). A more difficult skill to master, the ghost says, is "gibbering" – “that's something like a job” (p. 31). Ghosts are required to spend a great deal of money on skulls, crossbones, coloured fire, the fitting of robes, and other expenses. Ghosts also must conform to the standards of the Haunted House Committee, who "make a fuss / Because a Ghost was French, or Russ, / Or even from the City", and who disapprove of dialects such as the Irish brogue (p. 34).

=== Canto 5. Byckerment ===
The narrator asks, aren’t victims consulted about their particular ghost? “Not a bit!” – imagine, he tells us, what it would take to satisfy a single child: “There’d be no end to it!” (p. 35). Ghosts regard new houses as unsuitable for haunting until the ghost has "trimmed" the premises by loosening doors and drilling holes in floorboards “to let the wind come whistling through” (p. 38).

The ghost mentions that he is subject to the authority of the Knight-Mayor. When the narrator says he doesn’t know the Knight-Mayor the ghost tells him, “Either you never go to bed,/Or you’ve a grand digestion”, as the Knight-Mayor's duties are to "pinch and poke” those who eat too much before going to sleep (p. 39).

=== Canto 6. Dyscomfyture ===
The ghost discovers he has the wrong house and is not at Tibbs’ house but Tibbets’, which makes the Phantom very angry and he tells our narrator, Tibbets,

“Why couldn’t you have told me so
Three quarters of an hour ago?
You king of all the asses!” (p. 48)

When the narrator objects that he is not to blame for the ghost's carelessness, the ghost quickly calms down, accepts responsibility for his mistake, and thanks Tibbets for his hospitality. The scene ends with the two shaking hands (the ghost calls Tibbets “Turnip-top”). He says a Sprite may be sent instead and gives him advice on how to manage the sprite by rapping him on the knuckles.

=== Canto 7. Sad Souvenaunce ===
The Phantom leaves (favorite phantom) and nothing can bring him back, which leaves the narrator weeping…so he makes himself a drink and sings a “Coronach”

“And art thou gone, beloved ghost?
Best of all familiars!
Nay, then, farewell, my duckling roast,
Farewell, Farewell, my tea and toast,
My meerschaum and cigars!”

== Publication ==
=== Phantasmagoria and Other Poems ===
1869 collection of 26 poems, unillustrated.

Phantasmagoria by Lewis Carroll was first published by Macmillan and Co., London, in 1869. Macmillan was also the publisher of the Alice in Wonderland books by Carroll. The first edition, had a blue cardboard cover with gold embossed cover illustration and edges and spine, bound by Burn & Co., Kirby Street, E.C.

Cover illustrations on the original book (Morgan Library copy) represent the Crab Nebula in Taurus and Donati's Comet, "Two distinguished members of the Celestial Phantasmagoria".

Illustration of the Crab Nebula on the front cover of the original publication of phantasmagoria.

=== Rhyme? and Reason? ===
1883 collection of 17 poems (also New York: Macmillan and Co., 1884), illustrated by Arthur B. Frost (new) and Henry Holiday ("The Hunting of the Snark").

One of the front pages states (quote):

Of the following poems, "Echoes", "A Game of Fives", the last three of the "Four Riddles", and "Fame's Penny-Trumpet", are here published for the first time. The others have all appeared before, as have also the illustrations to "The Hunting of the Snark".

Some library records for Phantasmagoria and Other Poems, and other sources concerning that title, provide a list of contents that includes the four poems first published in 1883. This is because Macmillan re-used the old title Phantasmagoria and Other Poems for a different collection in 1911 and stated on its title page "First published in 1869." In fact, it is a reissue of Rhyme? and Reason? except that "The Hunting of the Snark" is omitted. See Ebook #651 at Project Gutenberg, whose source is the 1911 collection.

- Phantasmagoria, in Seven Cantos [listed]
- Echoes
- A Sea Dirge
- Ye Carpette Knyghte
- Hiawatha's Photographing
- Melancholetta
- A Valentine
- The Three Voices
- Tèma con Variaziòni
- A Game of Fives
- Poeta Fit, non Nascitur
- The Hunting of the Snark, an Agony in Eight Fits [listed]
- Size and Tears
- Atalanta in Camden Town
- The Lang Coortin'
- Four Riddles [numbered I–IV, with prose preface]
- Fame's Penny-Trumpet

=== Phantasmagoria and Other Poems ===
1911 collection of 16 poems, illustrated by Arthur B. Frost.

This collection matches the 1883 Rhyme? and Reason? in contents and sequence, except that it does not contain "The Hunting of the Snark" (and thus contains no illustrations by Holiday). A copy of the first edition is the source for Project Gutenberg Ebook #651.
