= Origins of a Story =

Reference Book

- Book cover
- Author: Jake Grogan
- Language: English
- Genre: Non-fiction
- Publisher: Appleseed Press Book Publishers Inc.
- Publication place: United States
- ISBN: 9781604337518

Origins of a Story: 202 True Inspirations Behind the World's Greatest Literature is a 2017 non-fiction book by Jake Grogan. It is about authors' inspirations for well known stories, including inspirations of Stephen King, Dr. Seuss, Lewis Carroll, and more.

== Reception ==
A review from Kirkus Reviews concluded with, "A lively peek into literary genius". Matt Sutherland of Foreword Reviews wrote, "If you’ve wondered how your favorite masterpieces got their starts, the itch can now be scratched". The book was a 2017 INDIES finalist on Foreword Magazine.
