= Boisaubin Manor =

Historic house in New Jersey, United States

- U.S. National Register of Historic Places
- New Jersey Register of Historic Places
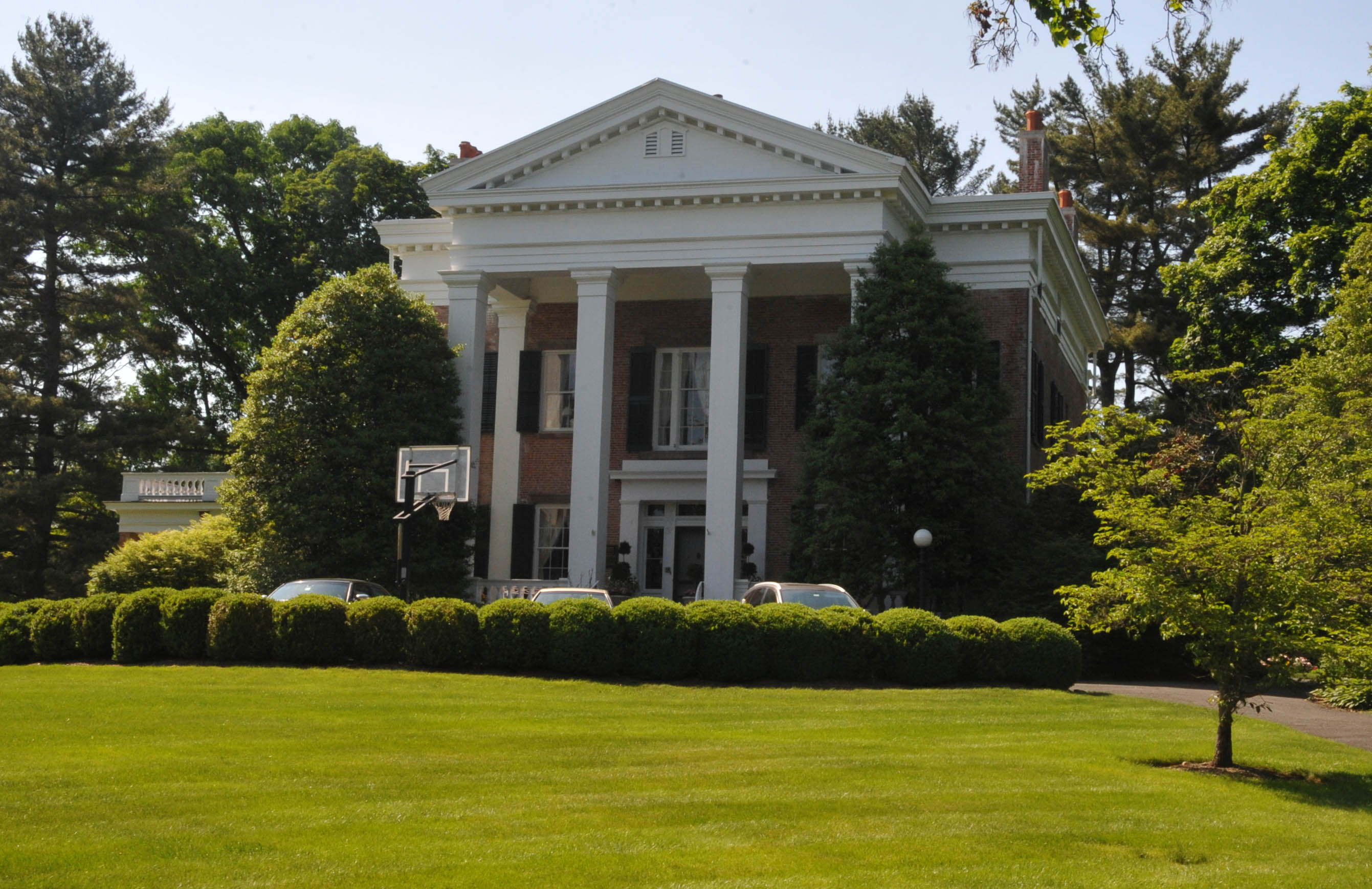

- Location within Morris County, New Jersey Location within New Jersey Location within the United States
- Location: Treadwell Avenue; Chatham Township, New Jersey
- Nearest city: Morristown, New Jersey
- Coordinates: 40.76750°N 74.44360°W
- Area: 9 acres (3.6 ha)
- Built: 1822–1834
- Architectural style: Greek Revival
- NRHP reference No.: 76001175
- NJRHP No.: 2097

Significant dates
- Added to NRHP: October 22, 1976
- Designated NJRHP: June 13, 1973

Boisaubin Manor is a historic brick house located on Treadwell Avenue in the Convent Station section of Chatham Township, southeast of Morristown, in Morris County, New Jersey, United States. Built sometime between 1822 and 1834, it was added to the National Register of Historic Places on October 22, 1976, for its significance in art and architecture.

== History and description ==
Vincent Class Van Schal-Kwyck Boisaubin (1755–1834) was born in Port-Louis, Guadeloupe. He was educated in Paris and became a member of the Garde du Corps of King Louis XVI of France. He fled during the French Revolution and purchased land near Morristown. The manor house was built sometime between 1822 and 1834 with Greek Revival style. His son, Amidee Boisaubin, inherited the property and in 1851 sold it to Alfred Treadwell. By 1890, the illustrator A. B. Frost bought the property and named it Moneysunk. In 1910, Henry W. Shoemaker purchased the property and called it Kresheim.

== See also ==
- National Register of Historic Places listings in Morris County, New Jersey
