= The Game of Logic =

1886 book by Lewis Carroll

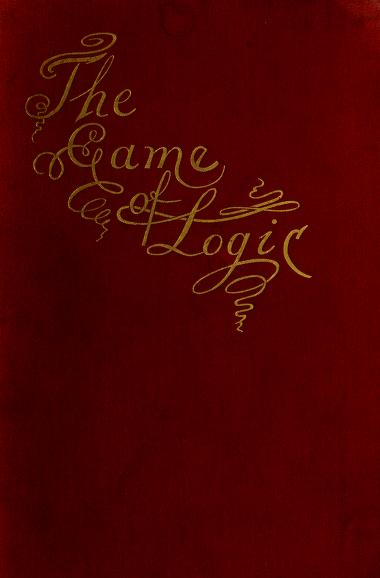
- Cover of the original edition
- Author: Lewis Carroll
- Publication date: 1886

The Game of Logic is a book, published in 1886, written by the English mathematician Charles Lutwidge Dodgson (1832–1898), better known under his literary pseudonym Lewis Carroll. In addition to his well-known children's literature, Dodgson/Carroll was an academic mathematician who worked in mathematical logic. The book describes, in an informal and playful style, the use of a board game to represent logical propositions and inferences. Dodgson/Carroll incorporated the game into a longer and more formal introductory logic textbook titled Symbolic Logic, published in 1897. The books are sometimes reprinted in a single volume.

The book aims to teach players the fundamentals of logic by asking players to use coins on a board. The proposition used in this context is: "Some fresh cakes are sweet." The game world is divided into four quadrants. It is to be played with five gray coins and four red coins. A red coin symbolizes one or more cakes being present in an area while a gray coin symbolizes the absence of the cake(s). Each quadrant represents a variation of the original proposition. The cakes are fresh and sweet within the northwest quadrant. They are fresh but not sweet in the northeast. They are neither fresh nor sweet in the southeast. They are not fresh but are sweet in the southwest.

The four quadrants are further divided into two subclasses: cakes that are eatable and those that are non-eatable. This subdivision allows players to understand more complex propositions and syllogisms.

The second half of the book introduces players to a 2x2x2 diagram. This allows for players to solve problems involving three propositions at the same time.

The book is divided into several chapters. The first portion, "To My Childhood-Friend" is as an introduction from the author to his readers. This is followed by a preface chapter. Chapter 1 is divided into three parts. In the first part, the author describes the three different types of propositions that will be used. The second part is an outlook on the "Universe of Things" and syllogisms. The third part of the chapter explains the logic to be used and the associated fallacies. This marks the end of the first chapter. The second chapter presents various questions for readers to answer. These questions are then answered and explained by the author in the third chapter. The last and fourth chapter contains various logic games.

== See also ==
- Logic puzzle
- Carroll diagram
