= Eight or Nine Wise Words about Letter-Writing =

Essay by Lewis Carroll

Eight or Nine Wise Words about Letter-Writing is an essay by Lewis Carroll on useful tips for composing, writing, mailing, and recording letters. The essay was published in 1890 by Emberlin and Son as a hardcover booklet consisting of 35 pages of text, followed by four pages of advertising, three pages of illustration, a stamp holder, and an illustration on the back cover. This essay is of some importance in philately because it was part of the "Wonderland" Postage-Stamp-Case, which was first sold in 1889 by Emberlin and Son. There were at least seven editions of the booklet and at least three editions of the stamp case.

== Table of contents ==
- §1. On Stamp Cases
- §2. How to Begin a Letter
- §3. How to go on with a Letter
- §4. How to end a Letter
- §5. On registering Correspondence

== Nine rules ==
Section 3 "How to go on with a Letter" contains nine rules for letter writing.

- 1st Rule. Write legibly.
- 2nd Rule. Don't fill more than a page and a half with apologies for not having written sooner! The best subject, to begin with, is your friend's last letter.
- 3rd Rule. Don't repeat yourself.
- 4th Rule. When you have written a letter that you feel may possibly irritate your friend, however necessary you may have felt it to so express yourself, put it aside till the next day. Then read it over again, and fancy it addressed to yourself.
- 5th Rule. If your friend makes a severe remark, either leave it unnoticed, or make your reply distinctly less severe: and if he makes a friendly remark, tending towards "making up" the little difference that has arisen between you, let your reply be distinctly more friendly.
- 6th Rule. Don't try to have the last word!
- 7th Rule. If it should ever occur to you to write, jestingly, in dispraise of your friend, be sure you exaggerate enough to make the jesting obvious: a word spoken in jest, but taken as earnest, may lead to very serious consequences.
- 8th Rule. When you say, in your letter, "I enclose cheque for £5," or "I enclose John's letter for you to see," leave off writing for a moment—go and get the document referred to—and put it into the envelope. Otherwise, you are pretty certain to find it lying about, after the Post has gone!
- 9th Rule. When you get to the end of a notesheet, and find you have more to say, take another piece of paper—a whole sheet, or a scrap, as the case may demand: but whatever you do, don’t cross! Remember the old proverb Cross-writing makes cross reading.

== See also ==
- Victorian letter writing guides
