= Charles Heber Clark =

American novelist and humorist

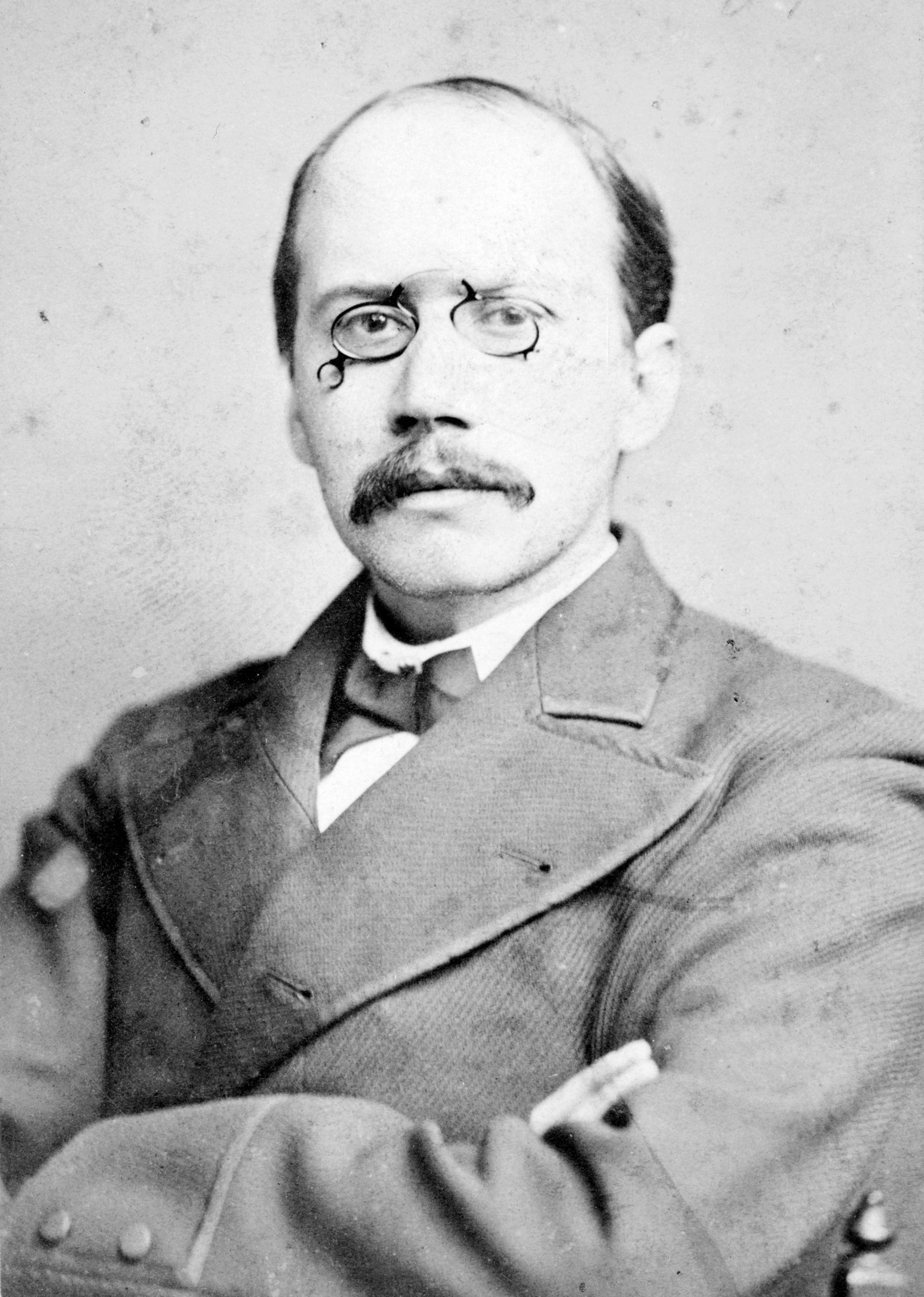
Charles Heber Clark by Frederick Gutekunst

Charles Heber Clark (July 11, 1841 – August 10, 1915) was an American novelist and humorist. Most of his work was written under the pen name Max Adeler. Clark was also known by the pseudonym John Quill.

== Biography ==
Clark was born in Berlin, Maryland, the son of William J. Clark, an Episcopal clergyman whose abolitionist sympathies made his stay in Southern parishes short. Charles was educated at a school in Georgetown, D.C., and at the age of fifteen became an office boy in a Philadelphia commission house. During the American Civil War, he enlisted in the Union Army. He was discharged two years later at the close of the war. He then became a reporter for The Philadelphia Inquirer, and within two months was promoted to editorial writer. Later he was a dramatic and music critic of the Philadelphia Evening Bulletin, and an editorial writer on the North American. He was interested in economics, and he was a strong advocate of a high tariff. The bias led him to become editor and proprietor of the Textile Record, a founder and secretary of the Manufacturers' Club, and editor of its organ, the Manufacturer. Clark was also on the board of directors of the Johnson and Johnson medical supply company. He became independently wealthy through investments and retired from editorial work to his suburban home in Conshohocken, Pa. He was twice married, his first wife having been Clara Lukens; she died in 1895. Two years later, he married Elizabeth Killé Clark, a "distant cousin." Clark was the sister of Walter Leighton Clark, an industrialist and founder of the Grand Central Art Galleries.

Almost all of Clark's literary output appeared under the pseudonym "Max Adeler." Among his most famous works was "Out of the Hurly Burly," which enjoyed immense popularity during its time but has largely faded from memory today. Clark's exuberant and lavish humor captivated audiences in England for an extended period, with some of his writings initially finding publication there. "Out of the Hurly Burly" was the first book illustrated by comics pioneer A. B. Frost, who would also illustrate other books by Clark. Some of the pieces in Clark/Adeler's books hold up quite well today.

A subject of much contention was Clark's claim that Mark Twain plagiarized his 1880 novelette "Fortunate Island" with A Connecticut Yankee in King Arthur's Court, published in 1889. In Clark's work, a technically proficient American is shipwrecked on an island that broke off from Britain during Arthurian times, and never developed any further, while Twain's book takes a technically proficient American back to the Arthurian times themselves. Twain actually wrote what he considered a rebuttal to the charge, only he compared "Yankee" to Clark's story "An Old Fogey" which also appeared in the same volume as "Fortunate Island." Additionally, Twain and Clark had a long running feud dating back to the early 1870s, where each writer accused the other of plagiarism. One piece by Twain attacking Clark (as "John Quill" but not actually named) appeared in Galaxy Magazine in 1870, entitled "A Literary Old Offender in Court with Suspicious Property in His Possession".

Clark hated his own reputation as a humorist in later years and gave up humor for a while. He returned to it in the early years of the twentieth century, writing light pieces for magazines, and a few nostalgia-laced romances. He died in Eagles Mere, Pennsylvania in 1915.

== Partial bibliography ==
- Out of the Hurly Burly; or, Life in an Odd Corner (1874)
- "Elbow-Room; A Novel Without a Plot" (1876)
- "Random Shots" (London - 1878)
- "An Old Fogey and Other Stories" (London - 1881)
- "The Fortunate Island and Other Stories" (US edition of "An Old Fogey and Other Stories) (1882)
- "Captain Bluitt, A tale of Old Turly" (1901)
- "The Quakeress, a Tale" (1905)
- "The Great Natural Healer" (1910)
