= The White Knight (book) =

- First edition
- Author: Alexander L. Taylor
- Language: English
- Genre: Biography
- Publisher: Oliver & Boyd
- Publication date: 1952
- Publication place: United Kingdom
- OCLC: 186449183
- Dewey Decimal: 828/.8/09 B
- LC Class: PR4612 .T3 1976

The White Knight is a biography of the author Lewis Carroll by Alexander L. Taylor, first published in 1952.
