= Carroll diagram =

Diagram type

A simple Carroll diagram.

A Carroll diagram, Lewis Carroll's square, biliteral diagram or a two-way table is a diagram used for grouping things in a yes/no fashion. Numbers or objects are either categorised as 'x' (having an attribute x) or 'not x' (not having an attribute 'x'). They are named after Lewis Carroll, the pseudonym of polymath Charles Lutwidge Dodgson.

== Usage ==
A more complex Carroll diagram.

Although Carroll diagrams can be as simple as the first one above, the most well known types are those similar to the second one, where two attributes are shown. The 'universe' of a Carroll diagram is contained within the boxes in the diagram, as any number or object has to either have an attribute or not have it.

Carroll diagrams are often learnt by schoolchildren, but they can also be used outside the field of education, since they are a tidy way of categorising and displaying information.

== See also ==
- Diagram
- Karnaugh map
- Set theory
- Venn diagram
- The Game of Logic
