= 1587 in literature =

This article contains information about the literary events and publications of 1587.

== Events ==
- April 14 – A clandestine Roman Catholic printing press is discovered in a cave on the Little Orme on the North Wales coast, where it has been used by the recusant Robert Pugh (squire of Penrhyn Old Hall) and his chaplain, Father William Davies, to print the first part of Y Drych Cristianogawl (The Christian Mirror), the first book to be printed in Wales. Attributed to G. R. of Milan (Gruffydd Robert or perhaps Robert Gwyn (c. 1540/50–1592/1604)), the book is given a false imprint of "Rouen, 1585".
- Autumn – Poet Torquato Tasso travels to Rome to stay with his friend Cardinal Scipione Gonzaga, Latin Patriarch of Jerusalem.
- October 31 – Leiden University Library opens its doors after its foundation in 1575.
- Late (probable date) – The first part of Christopher Marlowe's drama Tamburlaine the Great is performed in London by the Admiral's Men, with Edward Alleyn in the lead. Marlowe is known to be engaged in confidential government work.
- The Rose Theatre is built by Philip Henslowe in Southwark on the south bank of the River Thames.
- The chapbook Historia von D. Johann Fausten, printed by Johann Spies in Frankfurt, is the first published version of the Faust story.

== New books ==
=== Prose ===
- Antonio Agustín y Albanell - De Emendatione Gratiani dialogorum libri duo and Epitome iuris pontificii veteris (first volume published)
- John Bridges - A Defence of the Government Established in the Church of England for Ecclesiastical Matters
- George Gifford – A discourse of the subtill practises of deuilles by witches and sorcerers
- Raphael Holinshed – Holinshed's Chronicles, 2nd edition, revised
- John Penry – The Æquity of an Humble Supplication
- William Rankins – A Mirror of Monsters

=== Drama ===
- Thomas Kyd – The Spanish Tragedy (approximate date)
- Christopher Marlowe
  - Tamburlaine
  - (with Thomas Nashe?) – Dido, Queen of Carthage (earliest likely date)
- George Peele (possibly) – The Life and Death of Jack Straw (approximate date)

=== Poetry ===
- Cristóbal de Virués – El Monserrate

== Births ==
- February 24 – Matthias Faber, German religious writer (died 1653)
- June 21 – Kaspar von Barth, German philologist (died 1658)
- October 17 – Nathan Field, English dramatist (died 1620)
- November 17 – Joost van den Vondel, Dutch dramatist (died 1679)
- November 18 – Lady Mary Wroth, English poet and dramatist (died c. 1651–1653)
- Unknown dates
  - Michael Alford, English Jesuit writer (died 1652)
  - Francesco Angeloni, Italian historian (died 1652)
  - Francis Kynaston, English poet (died 1642)

== Deaths ==
- March 15 – Kaspar Olevianus, German Protestant theologian (born 1536)
- April 18 – John Foxe, martyrologist (born 1517)
- September 19 – Pamelius, Belgian theologian (born 1536)
- November – Mother and daughter:
  - Madeleine Des Roches, French poet and author (born c. 1520)
  - Catherine Des Roches, French poet and author (born 1542)
- Unknown date
  - Dudley Fenner, English theologian (born c. 1558)

== In literature ==
- Friedrich Schiller's drama Maria Stuart (1800) depicts the last days of Mary, Queen of Scots
