= William Davies (priest) =

Welsh Roman Catholic priest and martyr

Blessed William Davies

Martyr
- Born: c. 1555; North Wales, probably Croes yn Eirias, Denbighshire
- Died: 27 July 1593 (aged 37 - 38); Beaumaris Castle, Beaumaris, Anglesey, Wales
- Venerated in: Roman Catholic Church
- Beatified: 22 November 1987 by Pope John Paul II
- Feast: 27 July, 22 November (with the Martyrs of England and Wales)

William Davies (died 27 July 1593) was a recusant Welsh Roman Catholic missionary who worked as an underground schoolmaster in the Creuddyn Peninsula of North Wales. Davies was martyred at Beaumaris Castle in Anglesey during the Elizabethan era, as part of the religious persecution of the Catholic Church in Wales that began under Henry VIII and ended only with Catholic Emancipation in 1829. Davies was beatified by Pope John Paul II as one of the Eighty-five martyrs of England and Wales in 1987. Our Lady Queen of Martyrs Catholic Church in Beaumaris contains a large fibreglass relief at the west end of its nave depicting Davies' martyrdom. He is credited with involvement in the underground publication of Y Drych Cristianogawl and with composing at least one devotional work of Welsh bardic poetry during his imprisonment.

== Life ==
His former student William Robins later alleged that Davies was born into the Welsh nobility. A 1596 legal document named his father as Syr William Dai and further names Davies' paternal grandfather as the famous Welsh harpist Dafydd Nantglyn, who won the silver harp for his performance at the 1523 Eisteddfod in Caerwys. The Exchequer Rolls, however, contradicts Robbins by describing Syr William Dai as neither a gentleman nor a yeoman. Although Syr William was not a Catholic, the names of Davies' mother, Katherina Jevans, and his sister, Elena Davies, appear in the 1587-1588 Recusant Rolls for the parish of Llandrillo-yn-Ros.

Davies was born in North Wales, probably Croes yn Eirias, Denbighshire, but his date of birth is not known, however one source gives the year 1555. Groes yn Eirias is the old name for the area of dwellings between Llanelian and Colwyn Bay, Groes Road Colwyn Bay is a route to Llanelian Church. Eirias Park is in the same area. (It is now in Conwy County Borough.)

He arrived at Douai on 6 April 1582 just in time to assist at the first Mass of Nicholas Garlick. He received tonsure and minor orders on 23 September 1583, together with seventy-three English and Welsh students. Ordained as a priest in 5 April 1585, the Douay Diaries state that on 6 June 1585, he returned to work as an outlawed missionary to the Welsh people.

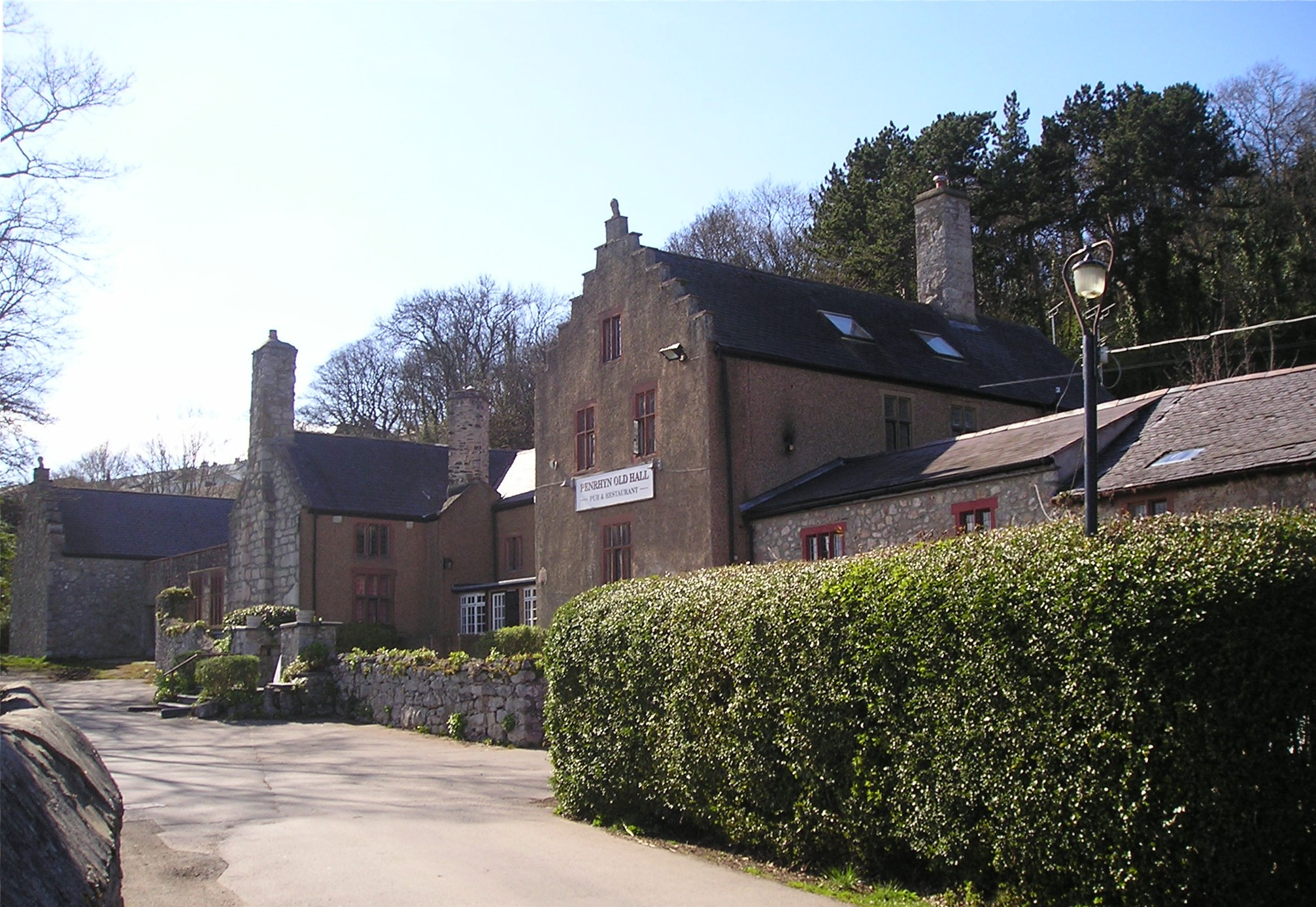
Penrhyn Hall, at the foot of the Little Orme

With the covert protection of Robert Puw of Penrhyn Hall (d. 1629), a recusant member of the Welsh gentry from the Creuddyn Peninsula and grandfather of the Cavalier poet Gwilym Puw, Davies turned the manor into a centre of underground education, an illegal minor seminary]. The now ruined medieval chapel dedicated to the Blessed Virgin Mary of Penrhys on the grounds of Penrhyn Hall was secretly used whenever possible as the seminary chapel.

After Henry Herbert, 2nd Earl of Pembroke replaced Sir Henry Sidney as Lord President of the Council of the Marches of Wales, an anti-Catholic crackdown was implemented. Pembroke was reportedly, "determined to stamp out Catholicism and recusancy in Wales and had been charged by Elizabeth on 15 September 1586 to implement the laws against Catholics with rigour".

In response, Davies was one of eight men who remained in hiding in a cave at Y Gogarth Fach, or Little Orme Head, betwixt Llandudno and Penrhyn Bay, between c. August 1586 and 14 April 1587.

While hiding in the cave, in high risk defiance of Elizabethan era censorship laws, Puw and Davies also secretly produced a print run of the banned Catholic book Y Drych Cristianogawl, a short essay on the love of God by exiled Welsh priest Gruffydd Robert and which is believed to be the first book of Welsh-language literature ever printed in Wales. According to Jan Morris, however, "the title page says, no doubt for safety's sake, that it was printed in Rouen". The strictly illegal Catholic altar and printing press Puw and Davies used were later captured by local magistrate Sir Thomas Mostyn of Gloddaith and other local priest hunters during a raid upon the cave.

On 15 March 1592, he was arrested at Holyhead along with four minor seminary students trained at Penrhyn Hall, whom Davies was smuggling via Ireland to continue their education at the English College in Valladolid. The arrests were instigated by a zealous Protestant named Foulk Thomas, but local Catholics attempted to intervene, which allowed Robert Puw of Penrhyn, who was along for the same errand to flee and successfully escape arrest.

He was taken the following day to Beaumaris Castle, where he was interrogated by Hugh Bellot, Anglican bishop of Bangor. Davies eventually confessed that he was a priest, but refused take the Oath of Supremacy or implicate anyone who had aided or received the sacraments from him. In response, Davies was separated from his students and incarcerated in a "dark stinking dungeon".

After a month he was able to visit his students for an hour each the day, and even to celebrate Mass. The jailor, who understood that they were solely, "prisoners for religion" rather than career criminals, chose to be so lax that they might have escaped had they so wished. Catholics from all parts came to consult him, and Protestant ministers came to debate with Davies.

At the assizes he and his companions were condemned to death, on which Davies intoned the Te Deum, which his four students also took up. The judge reprieved the condemned "till the Queen's pleasure be known".

Sent to Ludlow, to be examined by the Council of the Marches, Davies encountered more Protestant ministers. They took him to church under pretext of a disputation, and then began the Protestant service. He sang the Ecclesiastical Latin Vespers in a loud voice.

From Ludlow he was sent to Bewdley, where he had to share his prison with felons, and thence to other jails. He was sent back to Beaumaris, and rejoined his young companions. For some six months he lived with them the life of a religious community, dividing the time between prayer and study. Despite the pleas of Robert Puw, Davies refused to permit an attempt to rescue him from incarceration, as he knew it would require the use of violence. It is further believed, by at least one historian, that it was at this time that Davies composed a still extant work of Welsh bardic poetry titled "Carol Santaidd i'r Grawys" ("A Holy Carol for Lent").

== Execution ==
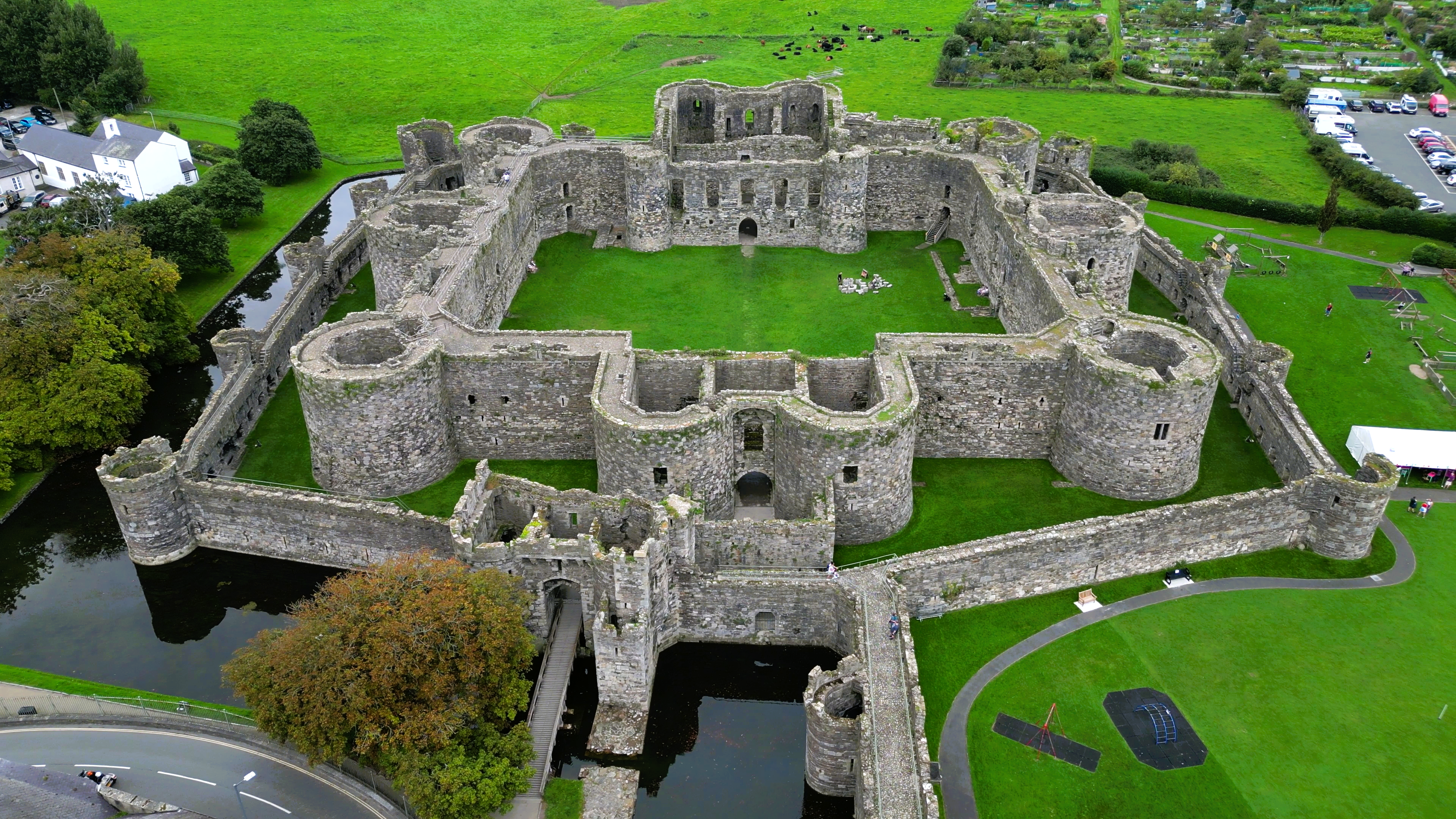
Beaumaris Castle in Anglesey, as it appeared in 2023.

At the summer assizes it was decided that the priest must die as a traitor, though he was offered his life in vain if he would but once "go to church". Due to widespread opposition that prevented any local person from agreeing to act as executioner, a butcher had to be imported from Chester and paid 40s. for the task. On 27 July 1593, Davies was hanged, drawn, and quartered at Beaumaris Castle.

Before he climbed the ladder, Davies was asked by the deputy sheriff what he thought of the Queen and replied, "God give her a long, prosperous reign and grace to die a member of the Catholic Church". After climbing the ladder, Davies said about the history of Anglesey, "This island was called in old time 'the dark island', the which name it never better deserves than at this present, but I beseech God that the blood which I am about to shed may give a light unto it of that Faith which it hath received above a thousand years ago". According to Diego de Yepez, Davies also kissed the hangman's noose and said, "Thy yoke, Lord, is sweet and Thy burden light".

Being then interrupted and prevented from speaking further, Davies instead said thrice in Ecclesiastical Latin, "In manus tuas, Domine, confide animam meam". ("Into Thy hands, O Lord, I confide my spirit.") Davies was then turned from the ladder and hanged.

An Elizabethan English account attributed to John Bennett alleges that Davies was allowed to die on the gallows before being cut down, disembowelled, beheaded, and quartered. The account by Diego de Yepez, on the other hand, alleges that Davies was instead cut down and disembowelled while still alive. His severed head and two of his quarters were afterwards displayed spiked upon Beaumaris Castle. The other two quarters were similarly displayed, one at Conwy Castle and the other either at Carnarvon Castle or at Caus Castle in Shropshire.

The four seminarians, though convicted of "felony" for having been arrested in the company of a priest and condemned to imprisonment for life, managed in time to escape. The youngest of Davies four "children", William Robins, found his way to the English College, Valladolid, where he recounted the whole story to Bishop Diego de Yepez, who wrote about Davies in his Historia particular de la Persecucion en Inglaterra.

Davies execution was also reported in a letter by Richard Verstegan to Robert Persons.

Davies' bloodstained cassock, the similarly bloodstained implements used for his execution, and the table the martyr had formerly used as an altar whenever offering Mass in prison were all sold by the executioner "for a good price" back to Davies' four "children" and afterwards preserved as relics. John Edwards of Plas Newydd dipped his handkerchief into Davies' blood and similarly treasured it as a relic. Robert Puw managed to acquire his deceased friend's severed hand, which was similarly treasured for generations by the Puw family, also as a relic.

== Veneration ==
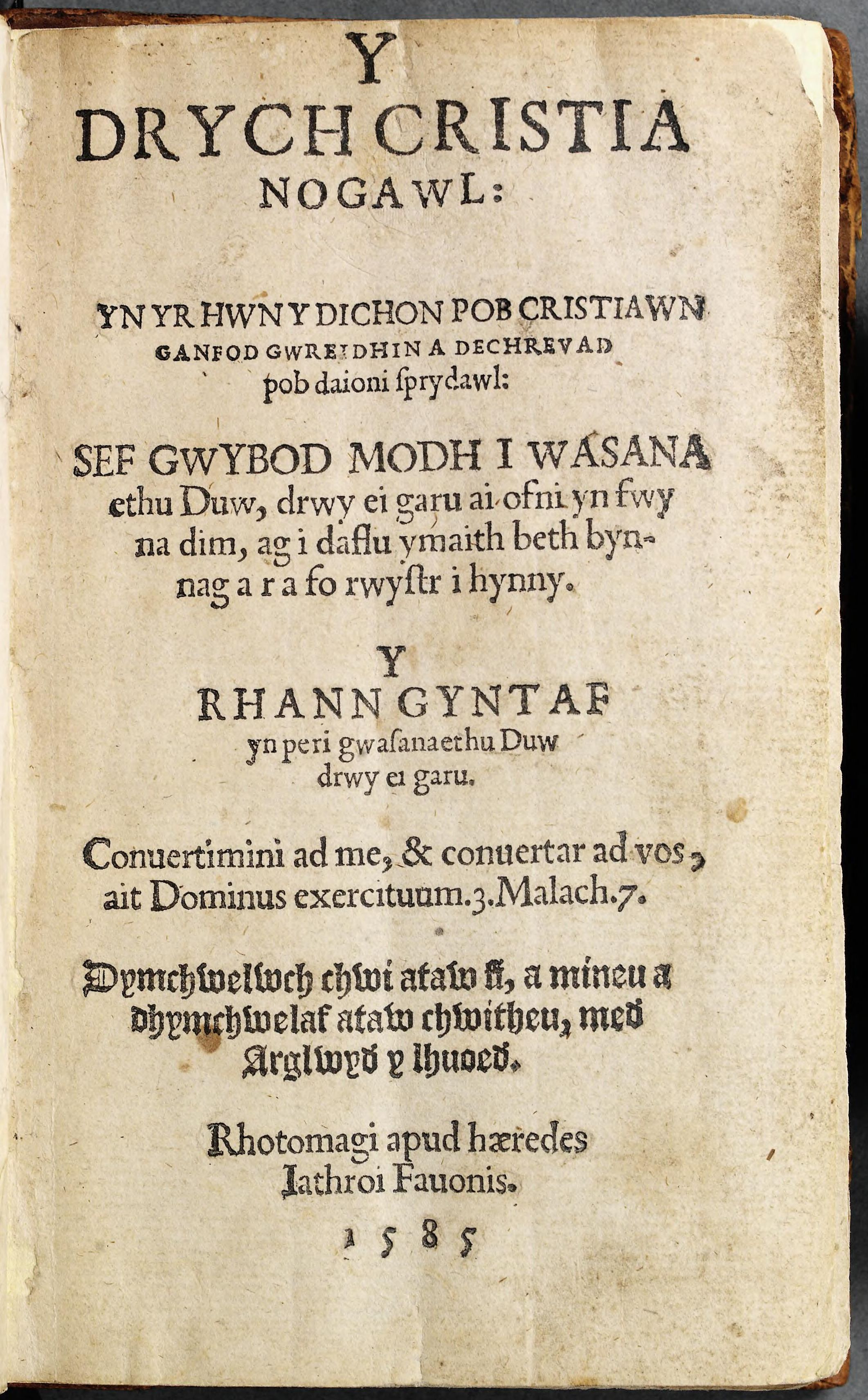
Y Drych Cristianogawl

William Davies was beatified by Pope John Paul II as one of the Eighty-five martyrs of England and Wales on 22 November 1987. Davies' feast day is celebrated every year on 27 July.

During the 2010 papal visit to the United Kingdom, Pope Benedict XVI was presented with an exact facsimile and replica of Y Drych Cristianogawl, which had been commissioned by Joseph Anthony Kelly, editor of The Universe Catholic weekly as a gift to the Holy See from the Welsh people. The facsimile was produced by renowned book conservator Julian Thomas at the National Library of Wales in Aberystwyth, using one of the only two surviving copies of the original volume.

Gwilym Puw, the grandson of Robert Puw, was later to praise Davies in Welsh bardic poetry as, "Syr William seren ei wlad" ("Sir William, star of his country").
