= Bodysgallen Hall =

Manor house in Conwy, Wales

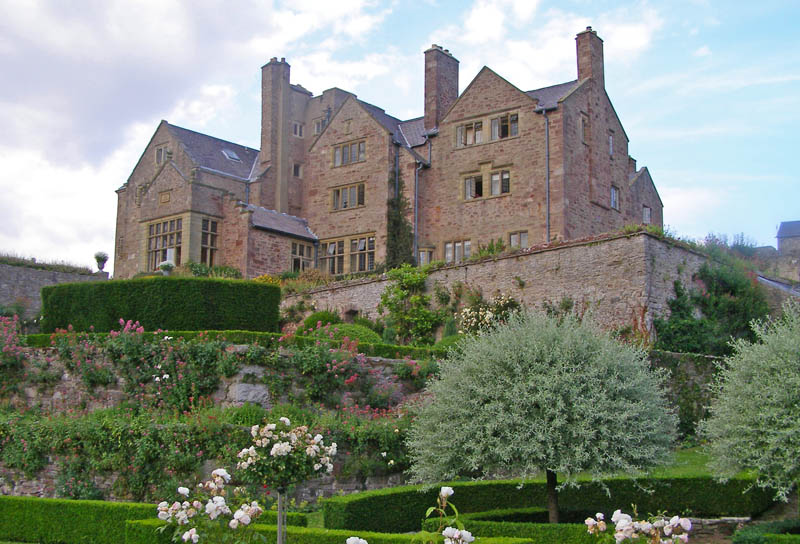

- Location within Wales

General information
- Location: Conwy county borough, United Kingdom
- Coordinates: 53°17′47.85″N 3°48′10.05″W

Website
- www.bodysgallen.com

Bodysgallen Hall is a manor house in Conwy county borough, north Wales, near the village of Llanrhos. Since 2008 the house has been owned by the National Trust. It is a Grade I listed building, currently used as a hotel. This listed historical building derives primarily from the 17th century, and has several later additions. Bodysgallen was constructed as a tower house in the Middle Ages to serve as defensive support for nearby Conwy Castle. According to tradition, the site of Bodysgallen was the 5th century AD stronghold of Cadwallon Lawhir, King of Gwynedd, who had wide-ranging exploits as far as Northumberland.

The ruins of Cadwallon Lawhir's residence are on a woodland knoll above the present Bodysgallen Hall. By 1835 it was a ruin totally overgrown by thorns. According to the ancient record of Caernarvon, Bod Caswallon (Bodysgallen) was one of the townships called Tre Welyog, meaning it was a unit of hereditary land (gwely) held in common by members of a wider family unit in medieval Wales, which was often divided and subdivided among heirs to the fourth generation; with the passage of time some of the smaller landholders might be "bought out" and become tenants of a larger estate. This possibly might have been one of three gwelyau, originally belonging to Gloddaeth.

== Cadwallon Lawhir heritage ==
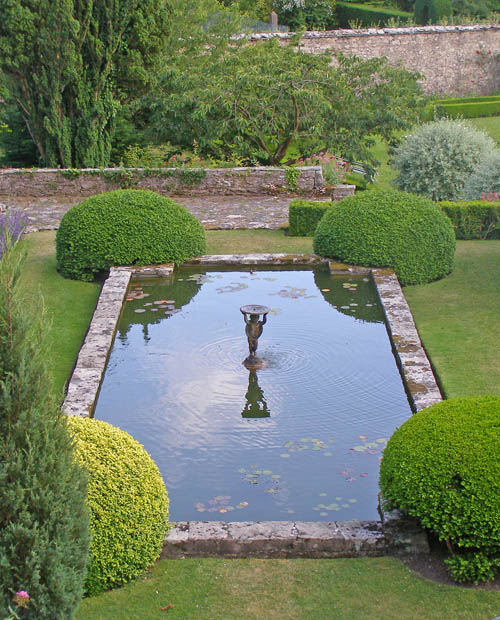
Reflecting pool in lower garden, Bodysgallen Hall.

The site was first occupied, according to tradition, by Cadwallon Lawhir (sometimes confused with another early Welsh leader Caswallon, which led in the 18th century to the false etymology Bod Caswallon "dwelling place of Caswallon" for Bodysgallen). Cadwallon Lawhir ("Cadwallon Long-hand", possibly a reference to the extent of his authority) succeeded to the sovereignty of North Wales in AD 442 and lived until 517; however there is no evidence for or against him having a court at Bodysgallen.

The 1620 block, built by Robert Wynn, finds its main entrance on the northwest exposure and has a 19th-century three storey gabled porch bay addition. On the ground floor the porch bay has a four-central headed doorway by first floor features of a transformed window and three mullioned windows to the attic. Behind the porch, this doorway retains its original door and latch. On the southwest exposure the bay nook windows on both ground and first floor are of 17th century mullioned construct.

== 17th-century history ==
Robert and Katherine Wynn owned the property in the early 17th century. They developed the present-day building core with severe rectilinear architecture with pink limestone mullions. The initials K.W. and R.W. appear in the 1620 date stone on the southwest gable. The largest rooms of the 17th century addition (and still today) are the ground floor or terrace level low hall and the great hall immediately above. Both rooms feature an unusual southwest corner construction of an unusual bay with windows on the south and west and a fireplace on the north side of the bay. Both fireplaces feature overmantels that display heraldic arms. In the great hall, these arms display the shouldered form rendered in Plas Mawr, an Elizabethan townhouse in Conwy founded by a branch of the Wynns. The arms include the motto of the Mostyns, Auxilium Meum a Domino ("my help is from the Lord").

== Mostyn and Wynn families ==
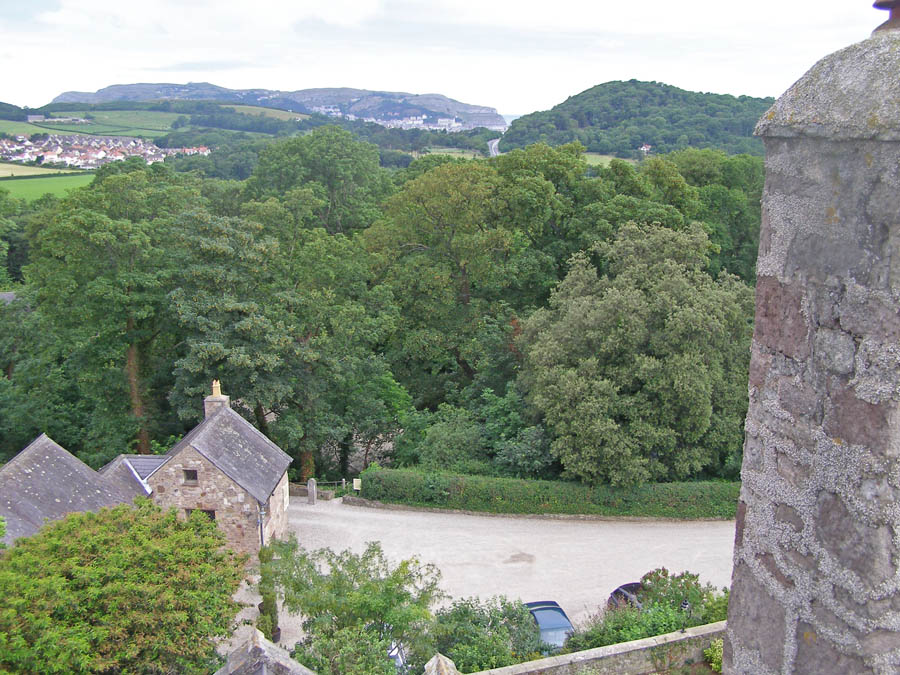
View from the tower of Bodysgallen Hall.

Richard Mostyn, the High Sheriff of Carnarvonshire, as it was called then, owned Bodysgallen in Elizabethan times. On the marriage of Richard Mostyn's daughter Margaret to Hugh Wynn (born 1620) that Bodysgallen, along with Berthdu, passed to the Wynn family. Richard Mostyn's son, Colonel (and governor) Roger Mostyn, is thought to have added the northwest wing to Bodysgallen, while Roger's son Dr Hugh Wynn, Prebendary of St Paul's Cathedral and Salisbury Cathedral, is responsible for the northeast wing which had a date stone of 1730.

When Dr Hugh Wynn died in 1761, his daughter Margaret (not to be confused with her great-grandmother Margaret Wynn née Mostyn) inherited Bodysgallen to add to her estates of Berthdu and Plas Mawr. In 1776 she married Sir Roger Mostyn, 5th Baronet (a descendant of the Elizabethan Richard Mostyn) and thus returned Bodysgallen to the Mostyn lineage after 156 years of Wynn ownership.

== Exterior architecture ==
The first recorded history of the site is in the mid 14th century in the Record of Caernarvon. The core element of Bodysgallen Hall is the late 13th century watchtower, intended to assist in defense of Conwy Castle. This five-storey tower is made of on site quarried pink sandstone with grit dressings and has a slate roof. The square tower has a five-storey ascending anti-clockwise (non defensive) spiral staircase with one small room on each floor. Independent masonry analysis of this staircase dates it to the late 13th century. The staircase becomes narrower with height. The treads are 60 cm (2 feet) wide at the top with maximum tread depth of 31 cm (12 inches). The core tower has later additions of global wings, with consistent vernacular style:.

== Gardens ==
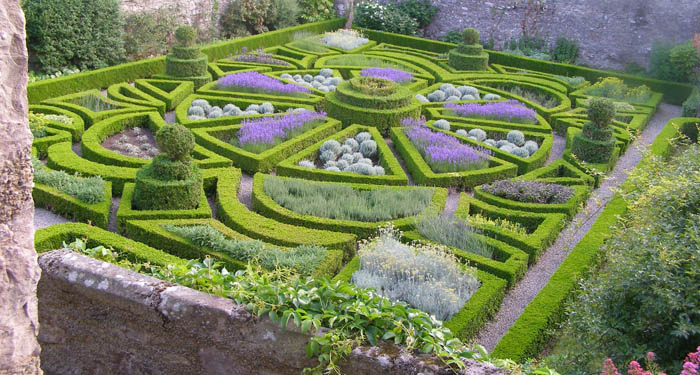
Bodysgallen Hall, Parterre garden.

Bodysgallen is situated on the west facing slope of Bryn Pydew hill within a broadleaf forest ecosystem between the first and second ridges south of the Great Orme and Little Orme headlands. Surrounding lands, still owned by the estate, exhibit sheep pasture and forests probably not very different from conditions 1000 years earlier. Thus it was natural to develop the gardens in a terraced form consistent with the surrounding forests. The tourist Richard Fenton noted in 1810 that Bodysgallen was "embosomed in woods of Noble growth, which are suffered to luxuriate their own way, without any fear of the axe". The original garden design dates from 1678 and is credited to Robert Wynn, son of Hugh Wynn, the original Wynn owner. The centerpiece sundial bears the date 1678. Robert laid the principal garden out in Dutch fashion, a sunken, high walled garden that became popular throughout Great Britain in the early 17th century. Today this garden consists of a low-growing topiary maze.

Below and to the east is the larger walled rose garden; other prominent garden features are a rectangular lily pond and a series of smaller herb and perennial gardens below the pineapple stone cottage and to the north. A croquet lawn is found to the north of the main building. The gardens are designated Grade I on the Cadw/ICOMOS Register of Parks and Gardens of Special Historic Interest in Wales.

== Area setting ==
The site has frontage on the north side of the A470 about one mile south of the seaside resort of Llandudno. The terraces at Bodysgallen command wide views towards the north and west.

== See also ==
- Dovecote
- Walled garden
- List of gardens in Wales
