= Creuddyn =

Creuddyn may refer to:

- The Creuddyn Peninsula, in Conwy county borough
- Creuddyn, Ceredigion, a historic commote of Ceredigion
- Creuddyn, Rhos, a historic commote of Cantref Rhos
- Llanfihangel y Creuddyn, a village and parish in Ceredigion
- Ysgol y Creuddyn, a secondary school in Penrhyn Bay
