= Creuddyn Peninsula =

Peninsula in north Wales, into Irish Sea

Coordinates: 53.31°N 3.80°W

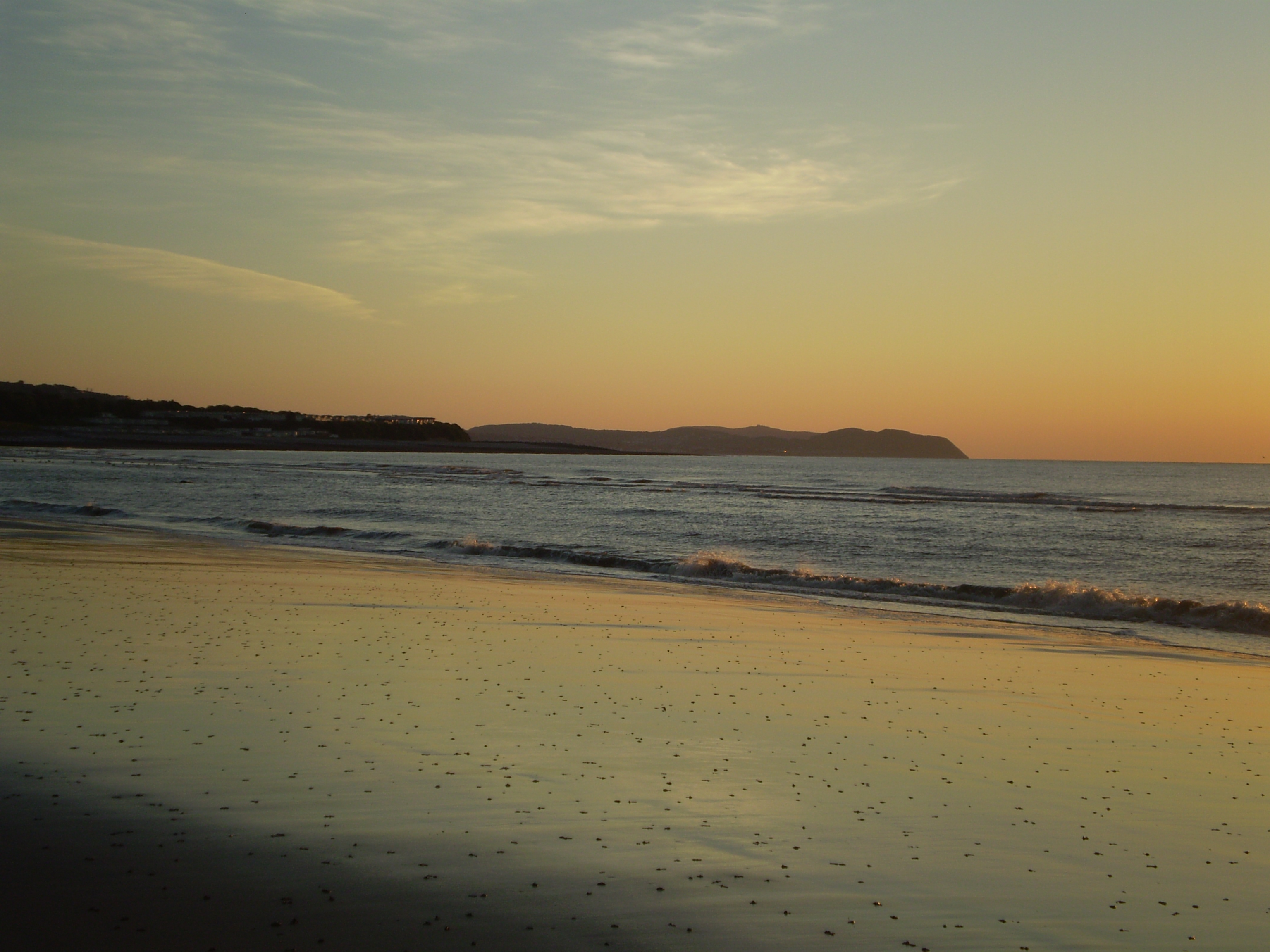
Creuddyn peninsula

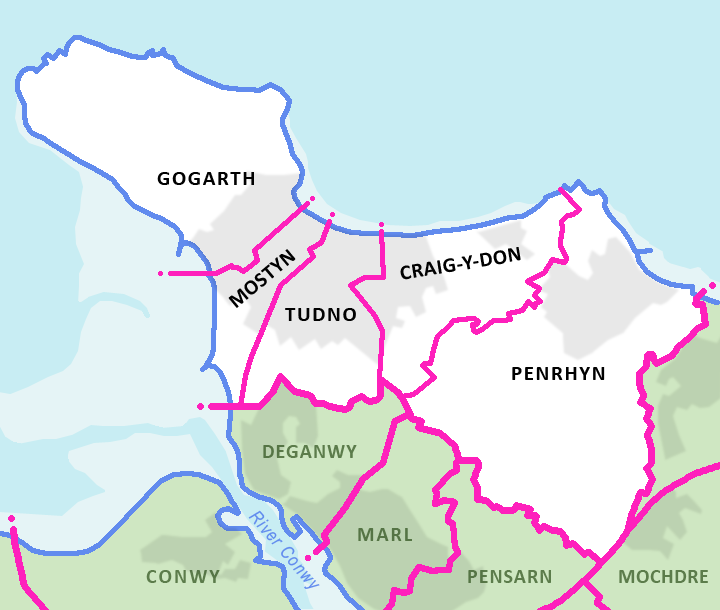
Electoral wards on Creuddyn (Llandudno community highlighted)

The Creuddyn Peninsula (Welsh: Y Creuddyn) is a small peninsula in Conwy County Borough, Wales, protuding into the Irish Sea's Liverpool Bay area. The towns of Llandudno, Rhos-on-Sea, Llandudno Junction, Penrhyn Bay and Deganwy sit on the peninsula. Their combined population is 38,952.

The area is also called Y Creuddyn, the name of a medieval commote (unit within a cantref) containing the peninsula—but slightly larger.

Ysgol y Creuddyn, a Welsh-medium secondary school, is named after the peninsula on which it sits.

== Geography ==
The peninsula is bounded by the Irish Sea inlets of Conwy Bay (on the west), Llandudno Bay (or North Shore; on the north) and Rhos or Colwyn Bay (on the north-east); the Conwy Estuary on the south-west, and, roughly, by the A55 road (North Wales Expressway) on its base in the south-east.

The Great Orme, at 207 metres, forms the limestone tip of the peninsula. A 141-metre-high headland, the Little Orme, lies on the north-east side. Several other limestone hills, all of around 100 metres, lie inland on the Creuddyn: Bryn Euryn, Bryniau, Coed Gaer, Bryn Pydew, Mynydd Pant and the Vardre.

== Settlements ==
- Bryn Pydew
- Craig-y-Don
- Deganwy
- Esgyryn
- Glanwydden
- Llandudno
- Llandudno Junction
- Llangystennin
- Llanrhos
- Pabo
- Penrhyn Bay
- Penrhynside
- Rhos-on-Sea
