= PUW =

PUW or Puw may refer to:

- Guto Puw (born 1971), Welsh composer, university lecturer and conductor
- Gwilym Puw (1618–1689), Welsh Catholic and Cavalier poet and Royalist officer
- Pullman–Moscow Regional Airport (IATA and FAA LID: PUW), a public airport in Whitman County, Washington, United States
- Puluwat language (ISO 639-3: puw), a Micronesian language of the Federated States of Micronesia
