= Llangystennin =

Historic parish in Conwy, Wales

Coordinates: 53.297°N 3.769°W

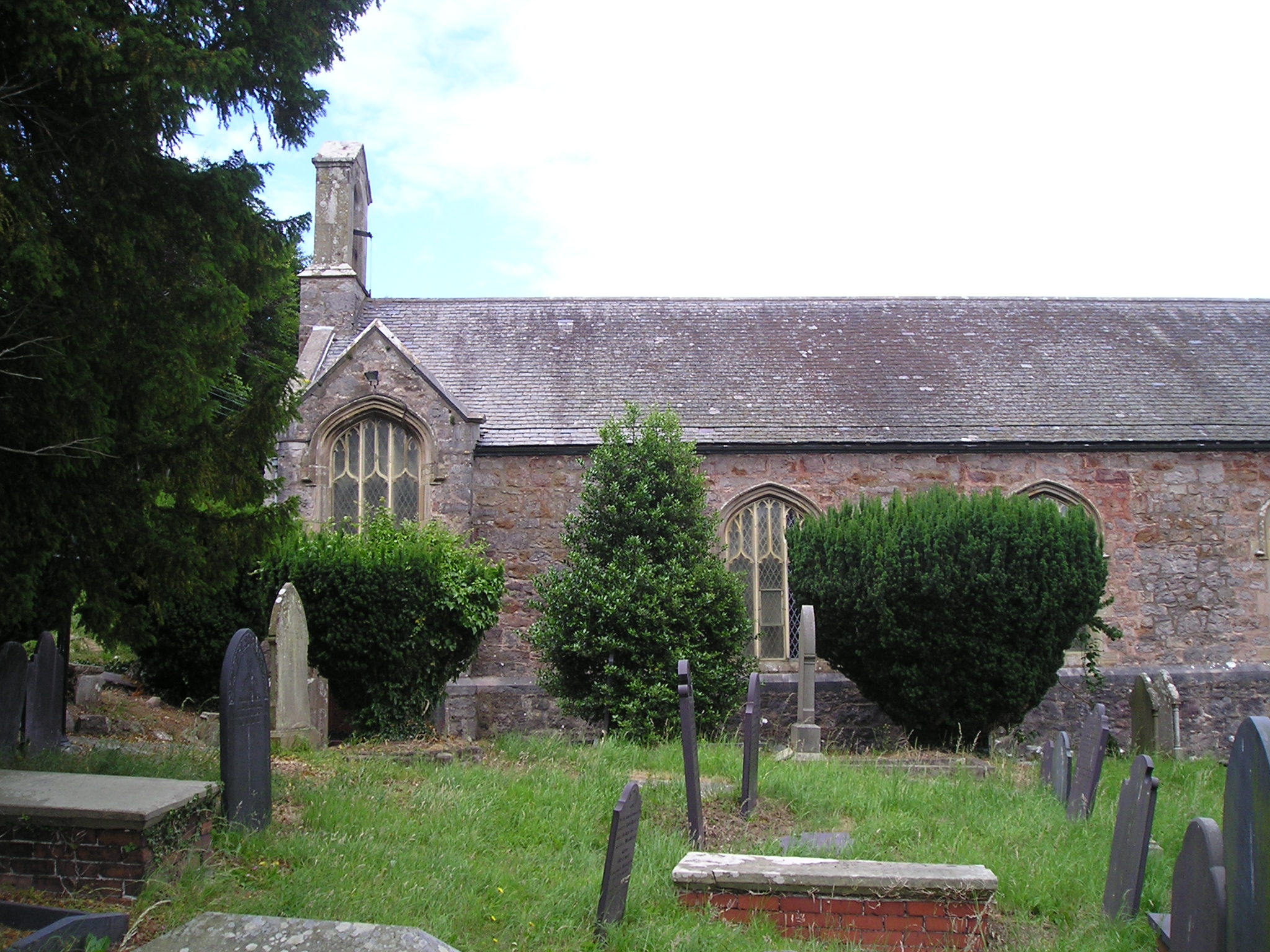
- Saint Cystennin's church at Llangwstennin

- Location within Conwy
- OS grid reference: SH766688
- Community: Llandudno
- Principal area: Conwy
- Country: Wales
- Sovereign state: United Kingdom
- Post town: LLANDUDNO JUNCTION
- Postcode district: LL31
- Dialling code: 01492
- Police: North Wales
- Fire: North Wales
- Ambulance: Welsh
- UK Parliament: Bangor Aberconwy
- Senedd Cymru – Welsh Parliament: Bangor Conwy Môn

Llangystennin (sometimes spelt Llangwstennin) is a rural parish to the south-east of Llandudno and Llanrhos in Conwy County Borough, north Wales.

Llangystennin includes Llangwstennin Hall, the villages of Mochdre, Pabo and Bryn Pydew and the small town of Llandudno Junction.

The parish takes its name from St. Cystennin (Constantine) who is said to be a son of St. Helen of Caernarfon (Elen Luyddog) together with whom and with his brother St. Peblig he is credited with introducing into Wales in the 5th century the Celtic form of monasticism from Gaul.

The parish is home to the St Cystennin’s Church. It was built in 1843, replacing the dilapidated medieval church that was on the same site. Although it's not known when the original church was built, there have been records of Christian worship on the site dating back to 338AD. The church bells from the prior church are archived in the People's Collection Wales. 15th century stained glass panels from the prior church were restored in 2007, and are now displayed within St Cystennin’s Church.

== Notable people ==
- Margaret Lloyd (Moravian) (1709–1762)
