= Gwilym Puw =

Welsh Catholic and Cavalier poet and Royalist officer

Captain Gwilym Puw (sometimes anglicised as William Pugh) (c. 1618 – c. 1689) was a Welsh Catholic poet and Royalist officer in the English Civil War.

== Early life ==
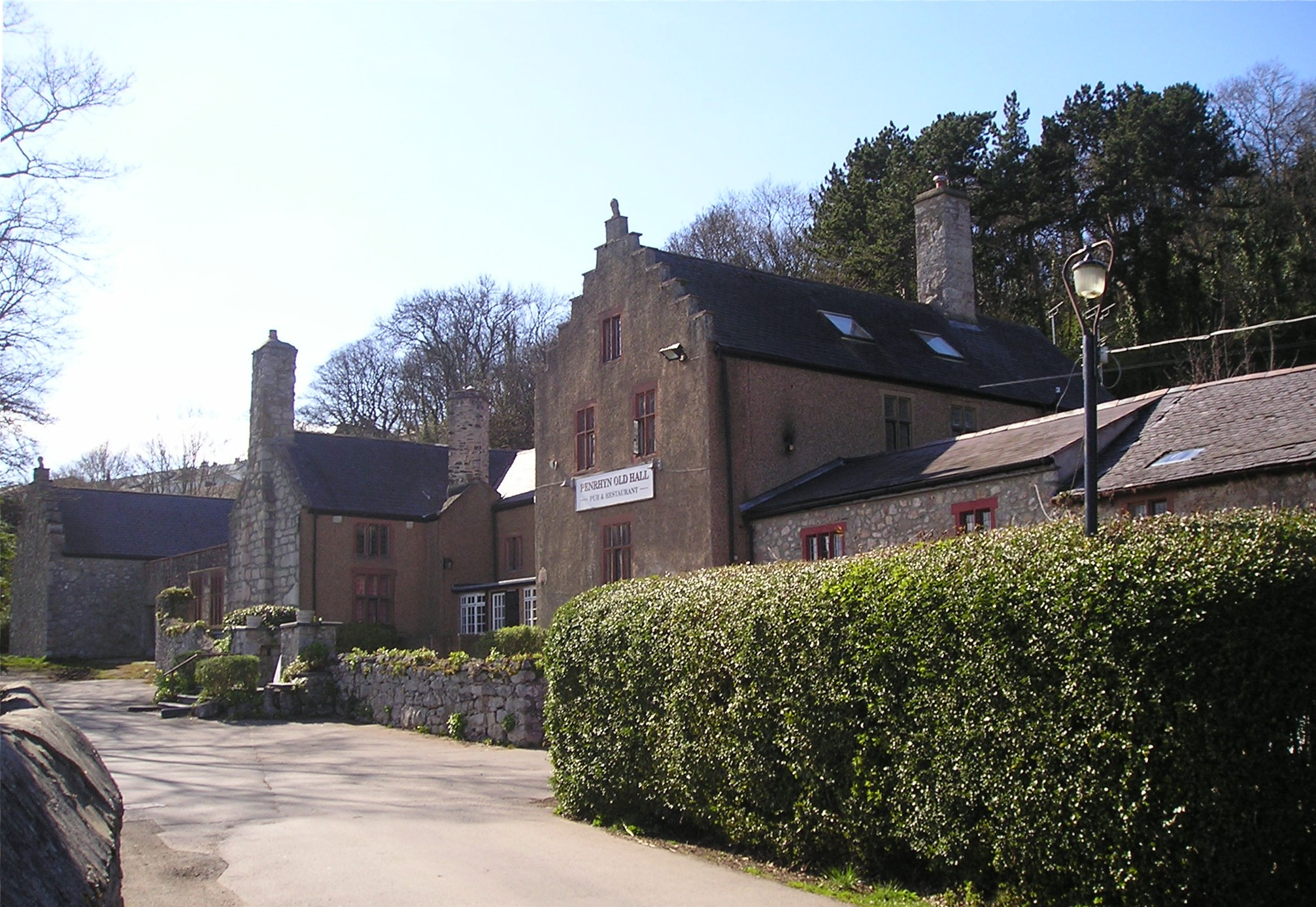
Penrhyn Hall

Gwilym Puw was born into a prominent recusant family of the Welsh gentry in the Creuddyn Peninsula in north Wales around 1618. His parents were Phylip Puw and Gaynor Gwyn of Penrhyn Creuddyn, Caernarfonshire and he was the third of at least four sons. His paternal grandfather, Robert Puw of Penrhyn Hall, is known to have been very closely connected to Elizabethan era outlawed priest and Catholic martyr William Davies, who Gwylim Puw later described as "Syr William seren ei wlad" ("Sir William, star of his country").

== Poetry ==
Puw was a prolific author of Welsh-language literature and strict metre poetry in defence of the Catholic faith. He also translated Catholic liturgical works from Ecclesiastical Latin into his native Welsh and collected and wrote down many works of secular and Christian poetry from the local oral tradition. In particular, it is due to him that the strict metre Welsh bardic poetry of St Richard Gwyn survives.

In 1648 he composed a Welsh poem in which loyalty to King Charles I is combined with devotion to the Roman Catholic Church. He begins by saying that the political evils afflicting Britain during the English Civil War are God's punishment for the abandonment of the "true religion". People were far happier, he proceeds, when the 'Old Faith' prevailed. But a better time is coming. Oliver Cromwell and his Puritan Roundheads will be made square by a crushing defeat, and the king will return "under a golden veil"; the Tridentine Mass shall be sung once more, and a bishop shall elevate the host. Here we have evidently a mystical allusion to the King of Kings on His throne in the tabernacle, and the Real Presence is the theme underlying the whole poem.
