= Margaret Lloyd =

Margaret Lloyd may refer to:

- Margaret Lloyd (soprano) (born 1973), American operatic soprano from Ames, Iowa
- Margaret Lloyd (dance critic) (1887–1960), American dance critic for the Christian Science Monitor
- Margaret Lloyd (Moravian) (1709–1762), Welsh Moravian worker and activist
- Margaret Lloyd George (1864–1941), Welsh humanitarian
- Peggy Lloyd (1913–2011), American actor and director
