= Little Ormes Head Quarry tramway =

Railway in north Wales (1889–1931)

Coordinates: 53.322°N 3.767°W

Overview
- Headquarters: Porth Dyniewyd
- Locale: Wales
- Dates of operation: 1889–1931
- Successor: Abandoned

Technical
- Track gauge: 3 ft (914 mm)
- Length: 1 mile

The Little Ormes Head Quarry tramway was a 3 ft (914 mm) narrow gauge industrial railway operating at three levels within the extensive limestone quarry on the Penrhyn Bay side of the Little Orme at Llandudno on the North Wales coast.

== Locomotives ==
Name	Builder	Wheel arrangement	Date	Works number	Notes
Mona	Hughes Foundry	0-4-0VB			
Little Orme	Manning Wardle	0-4-0ST	1873	478	Built for the Leeds Corporation Waterworks at Swinsty Reservoir
Ellesmere	Kerr Stuart	0-4-2ST	1912	1255	
Garth	Kerr Stuart	0-4-2ST	1914	1257	
Penrhyn	Kerr Stuart	0-4-2ST	1918	3092	Scrapped 1940
No. 1	Sentinel	4wVB	1926	6256	
No. 2	Sentinel	4wVB	1926	6255	
No. 3	Sentinel	4wVB	1926	6257	

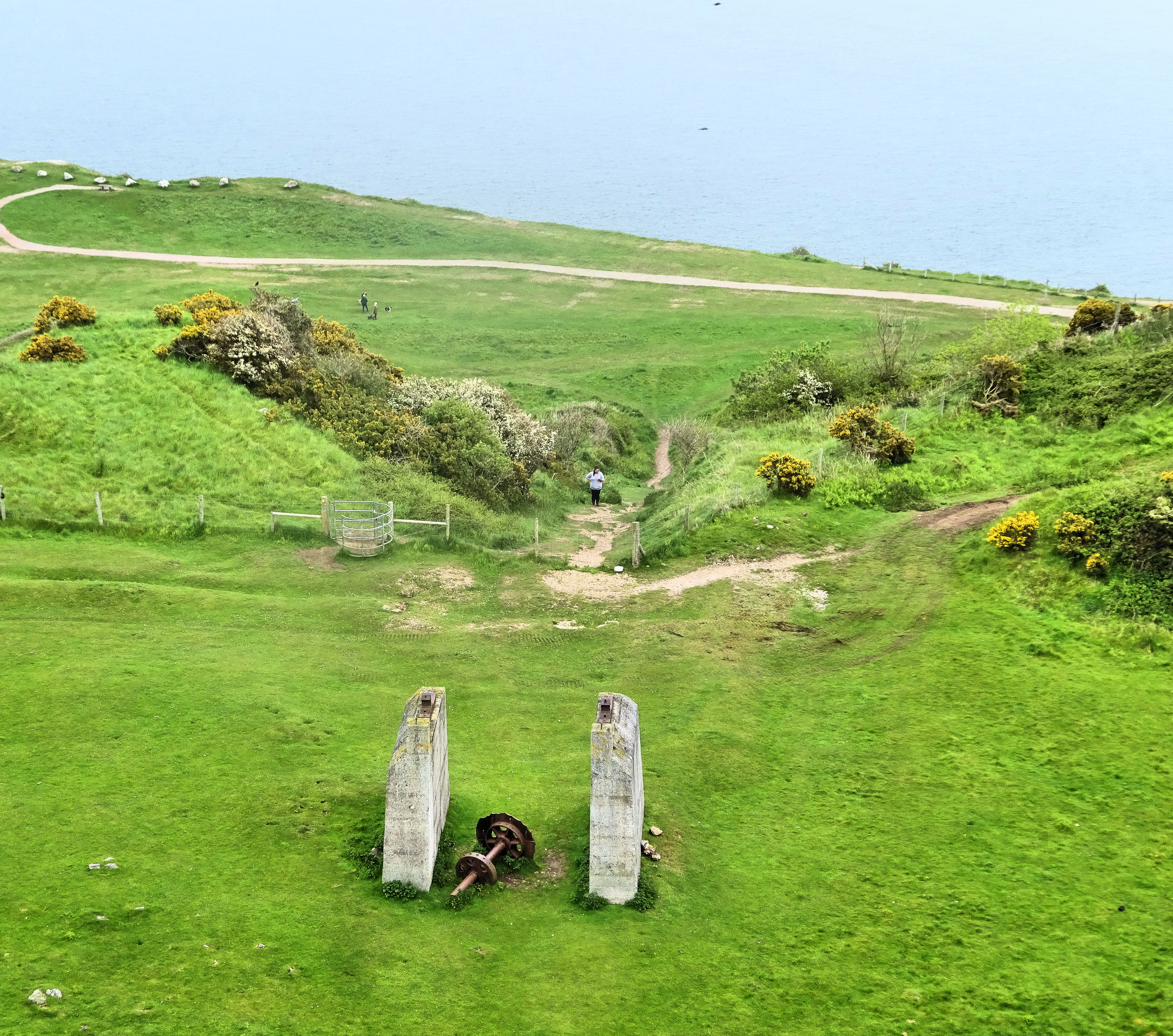

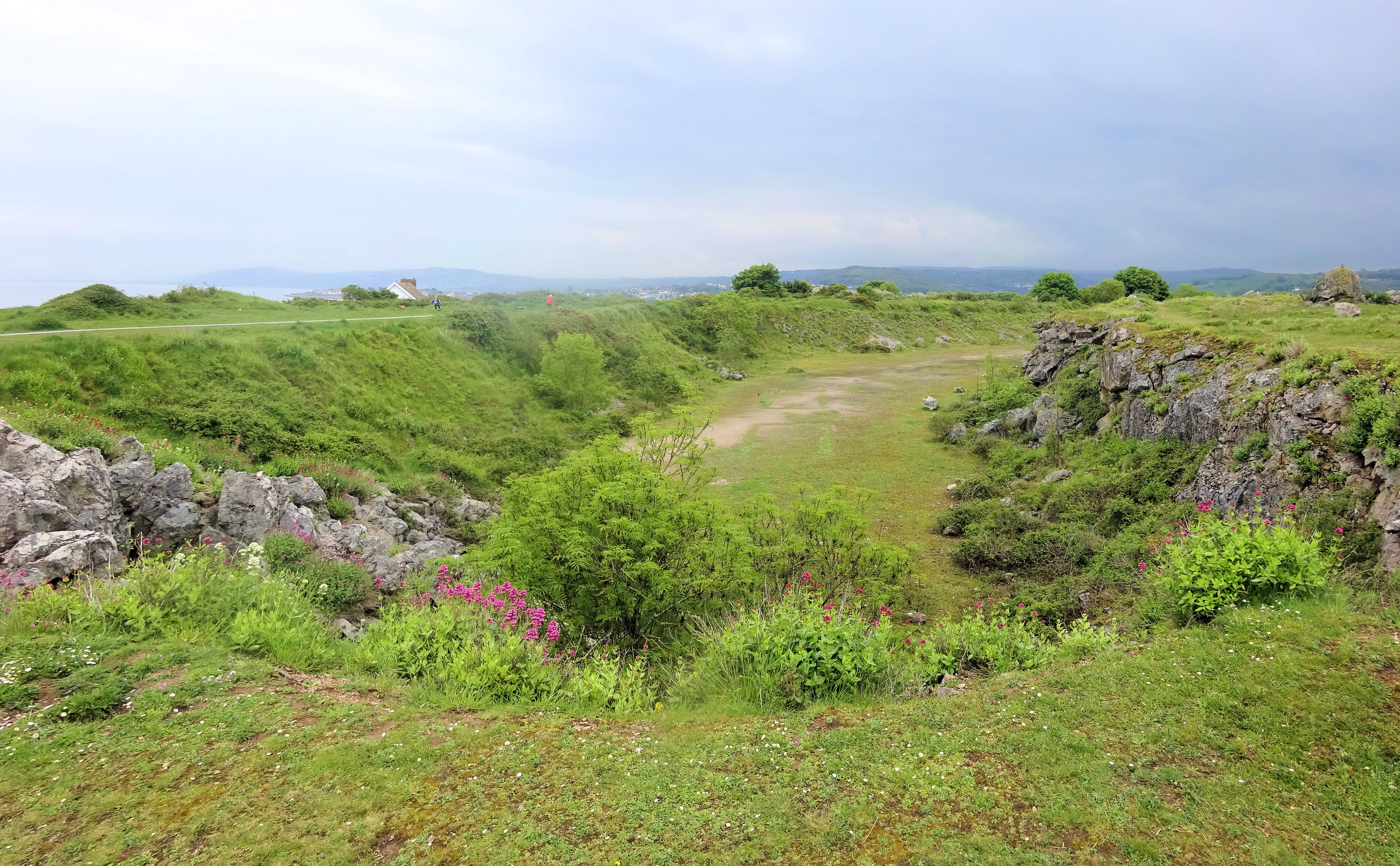

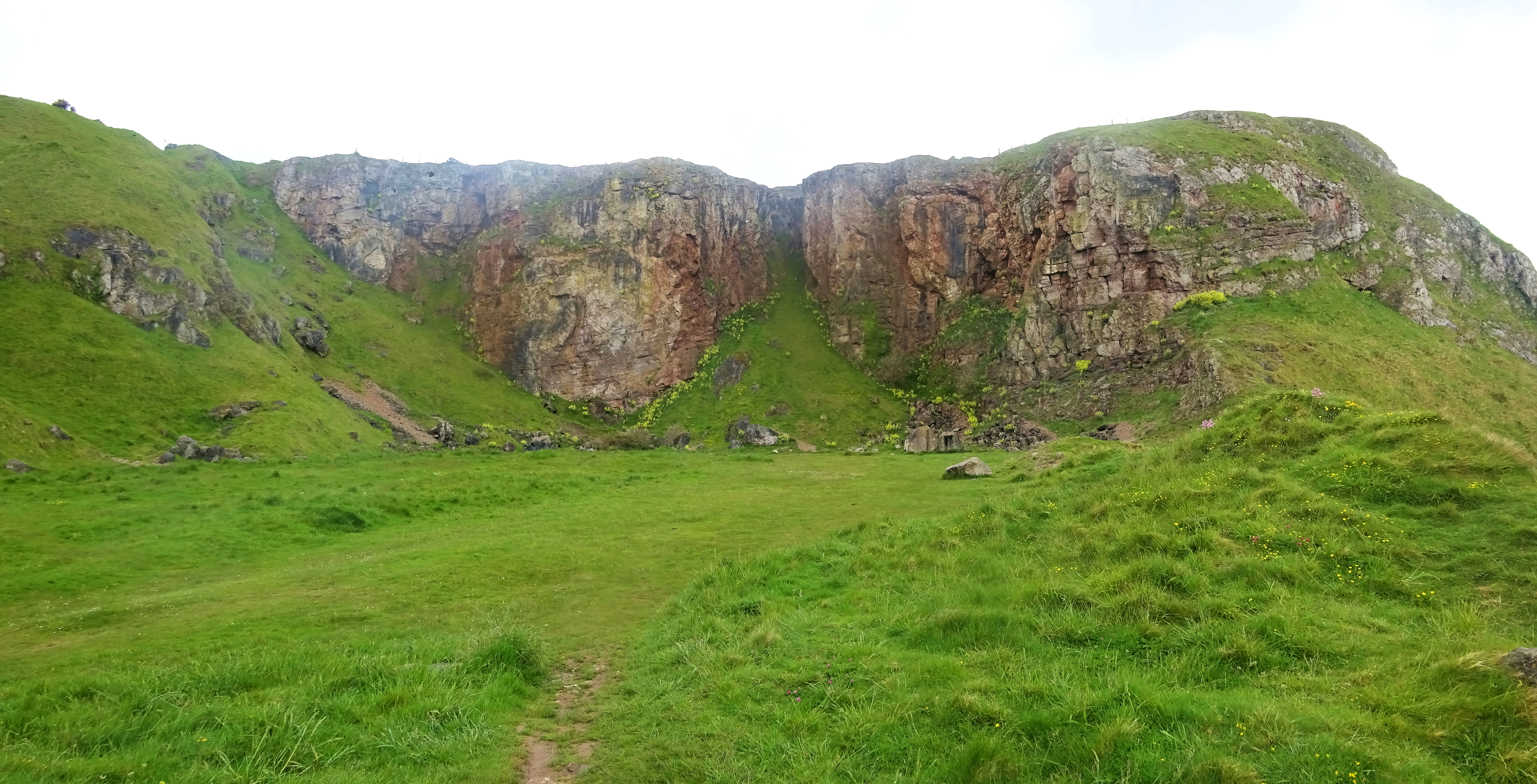

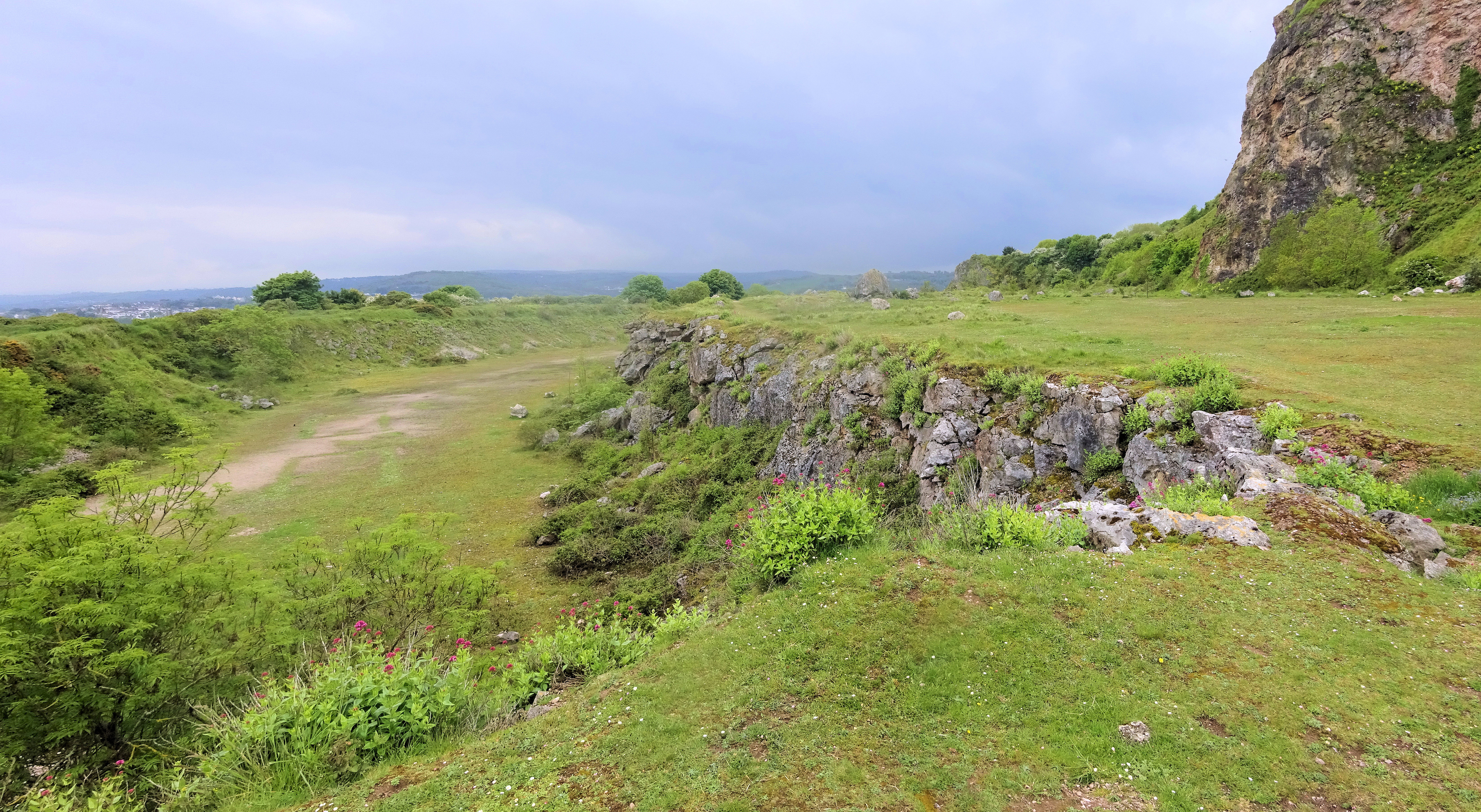

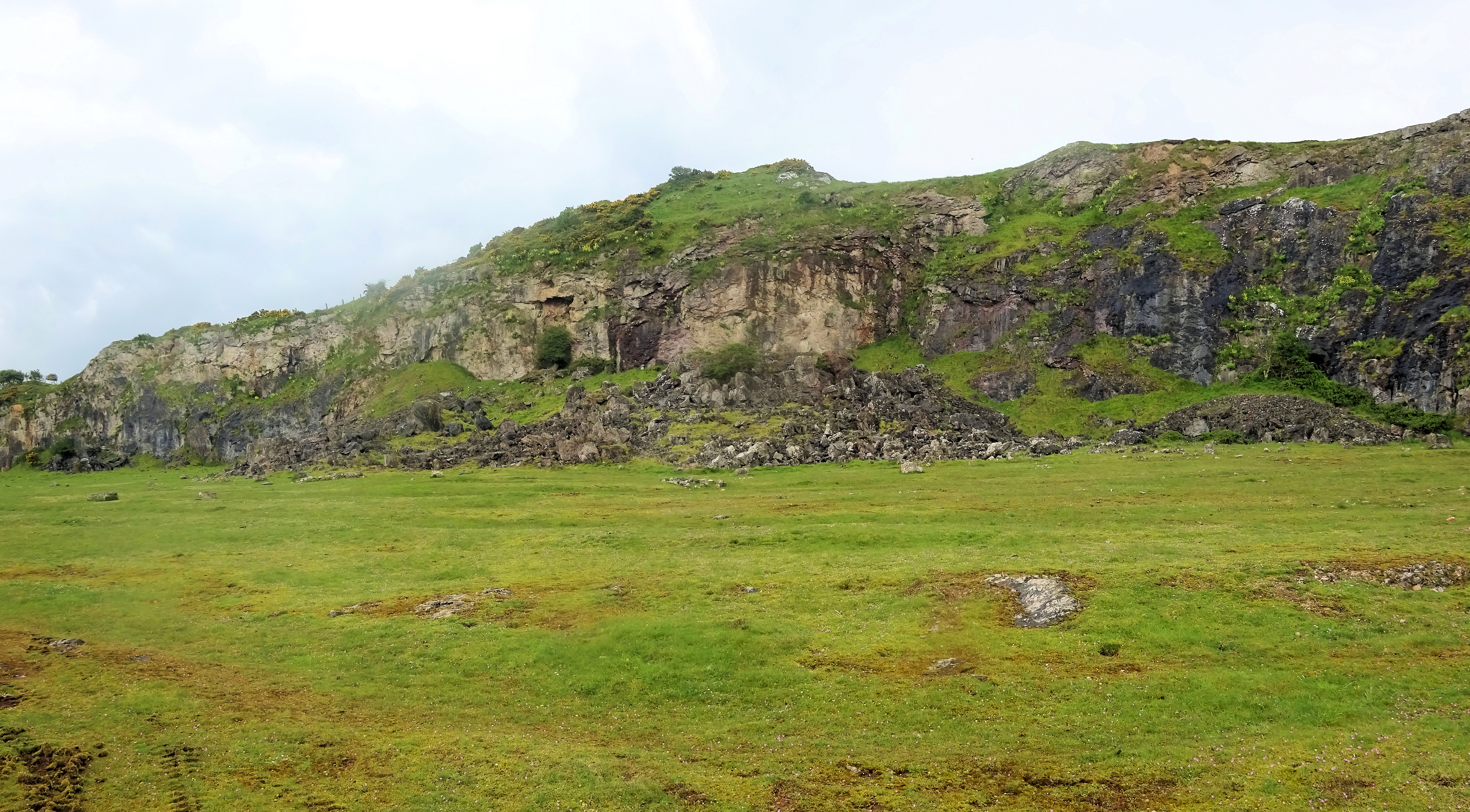

== See also ==
- British industrial narrow gauge railways
