= Al Lewis (singer-songwriter) =

Welsh singer-songwriter (born 1984)

- Born: 1984 (age 41–42); Pwllheli, Wales
- Genres: Folk, pop, Welsh
- Occupations: Singer, songwriter
- Years active: 2007–present
- Labels: ALM, Sain
- Website: allewismusic.com

Al Lewis (born 1984 in Pwllheli, Wales) is a Welsh singer and songwriter. He became known in the Welsh language media after his song came second in the Cân i Gymru contest in 2007.

== Biography ==
Lewis attended Ysgol y Creuddyn in Llandudno, where he formed a cover band called Bluewood.

He participated in Cân i Gymru in 2007, the 38th edition of the competition. He came second in the competition with the song Llosgi (Burning), jointly composed by Lewis and Arwel Lloyd Owen.

In 2007, Lewis released his first Welsh language EP entitled Byw Mewn Breuddwyd. Lewis appeared at the Wakestock Festival, alongside Mark Ronson, and at the inaugural Sŵn Festival in Cardiff.

In June 2009, Lewis released his first Welsh language album, Sawl Ffordd Allan, reaching number one in the C2 Radio Cymru Welsh language chart, and the Skin & Bones EP, in collaboration with fellow Welsh singer and songwriter Sarah Howells of Paper Aeroplanes.

Lewis and Howells have also recorded a live video session for the BBC. BBC Radio Wales described his collaboration with Howells as showing "cinematic mainstream melodies reminiscent of James Blunt or Simon and Garfunkel."

Lewis' album, In the Wake, was released in October 2010.

In early 2013, Lewis released his second English language album, which again featured backing vocals from Sarah Howells. The album also features a rerecorded version of Llosgi. The album was produced by Charlie Peacock. The album was recorded at his home studio in Nashville.

In December 2013 Lewis released a Christmas single, A Child's Christmas in Wales, in homage to Welsh poet and writer Dylan Thomas. The song was added to the BBC Radio 2 playlist.

By his links in Nashville, Lewis met Mississippi-born singer-songwriter Alva Leigh and they formed the band Lewis and Leigh. As of October 2014 Lewis and Leigh have released a four-track EP, Night Drives. The EP features three original songs and a cover of Wilco's Say You Miss Me.

Lewis's music is regularly played on BBC Radio 2. In 2015 he headlined the bill at Sesiwn Fawr in Dolgellau.

== Discography ==
=== Albums ===
- Sawl Ffordd Allan (2009), Sain
- In the Wake (2010), ALM
- Ar Gof a Chadw (2011)
- Battles (2013), ALM
- Heulwen o Hiraeth (2014) – as Al Lewis Band
- Ghost (2016), Celticana Records – with Alva Leigh as Lewis & Leigh
- Pethe Bach Aur (2018) – as Al Lewis Band
- Te yn y Grug (2020) – as Al Lewis
- Fifteen Years (2024) – as Al Lewis

=== EPs ===
- Byw mewn Breuddwyd (2007), ALM
- Dilyn pob Cam (2008), Sain
- One Way Love Affair (2008), ALM
- Skin and Bones (2009), ALM
- Our Lines Remain (2012), ALM
