= Tegwen =

Tegwen is a Welsh feminine given name. It derives from teg "lovely" and (g)wen "blessed".

Notable people with the name Tegwen include:

- Tegwen Bruce-Deans (born 2000), writer
- Tegwen Malik (born 1975), Welsh squash player
- Tegwen Matthews (born 1955), Welsh amateur golfer
