= Llanrhos =

Village in Conwy County Borough, Wales

Coordinates: 53.303°N 3.815°W

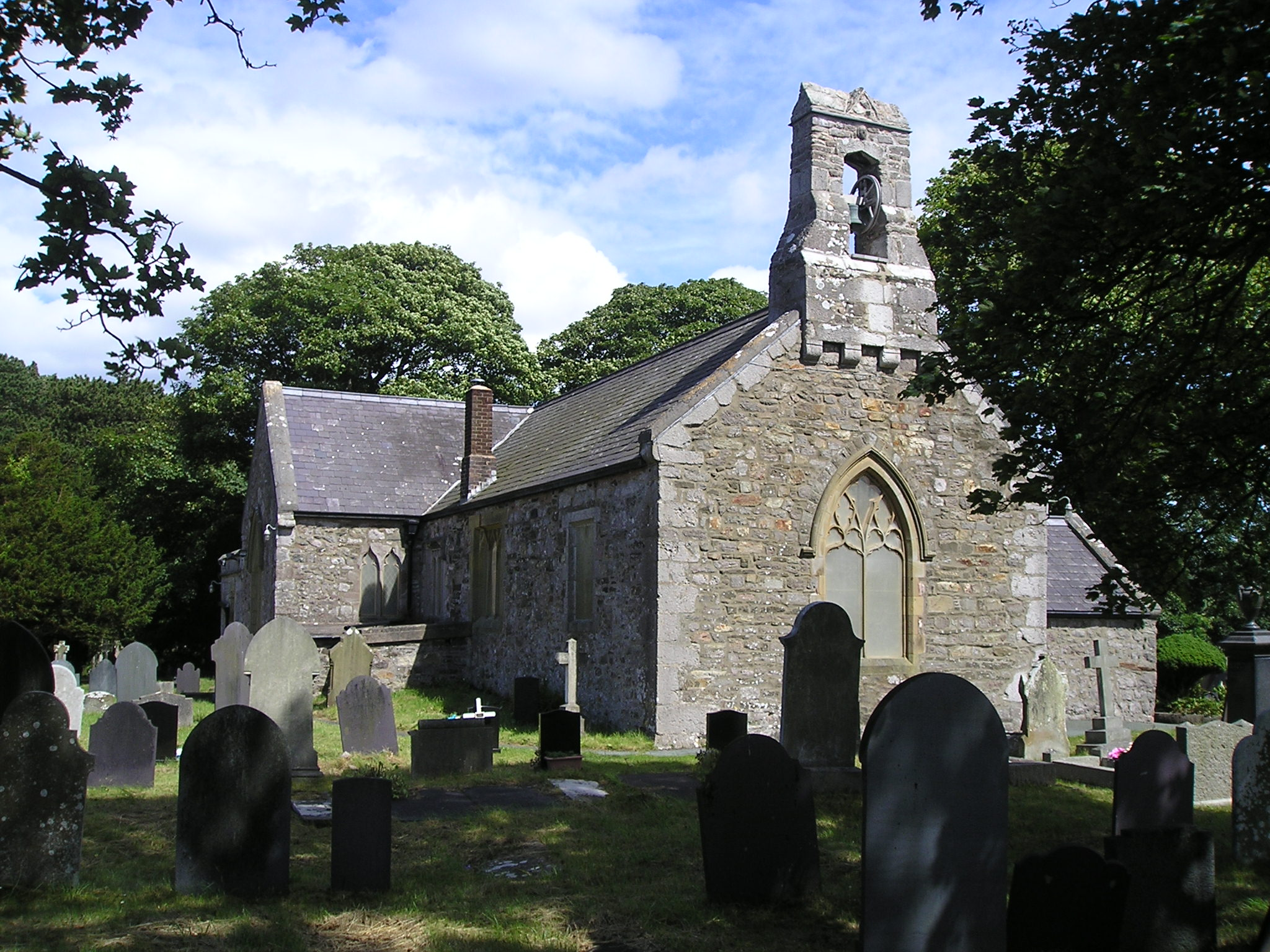
- Saint Hilary's church at Llanrhos

- Location within Conwy
- OS grid reference: SH790800
- Community: Conwy
- Principal area: Conwy
- Country: Wales
- Sovereign state: United Kingdom
- Post town: LLANDUDNO
- Postcode district: LL30
- Dialling code: 01492
- Police: North Wales
- Fire: North Wales
- Ambulance: Welsh
- UK Parliament: Bangor Aberconwy
- Senedd Cymru – Welsh Parliament: Bangor Conwy Môn

Llanrhos (Welsh for 'church on the moor') is a village in the community of Conwy, in Conwy County Borough, Wales. The village lies between the towns of Conwy and Llandudno. Llanrhos was a civil parish from 1894 until 1974. The area was formerly part of a larger parish called Eglwys Rhos or Eglwysrhos, being an old variant name for the same village. The ancient parish included Deganwy, the Craig-y-Don district of Llandudno, the Little Orme and Penrhyn Bay. The area was in the administrative county of Caernarfonshire prior to 1974.

== History ==
Until the 19th century, the name Eglwysrhos was used interchangeably with Llanrhos, but seemed to fall out of favour with time. From the 19th century Eglwysrhos was predominately used to describe the wider parish, and Llanrhos the village inside its boundaries.

An area in the south-west of the parish including Deganwy was included within the ancient borough boundaries of Conwy. As more urban areas developed within the parish, new administrative structures were set up to manage them. In 1854 an area on the northern edge of the parish was included within the Llandudno Improvement Commissioners District.

When elected parish and district councils were established under the Local Government Act 1894, parishes were no longer permitted to straddle district boundaries. The old parish of Eglwysrhos was therefore split into three civil parishes:

- "Eglwysrhos" covering the part within the Llandudno Improvement Commissioners District (which became Llandudno Urban District at the same time).
- "Llanrhos" covering the part within the borough of Conwy.
- "Penrhyn" covering the remainder of the old parish, plus the rural part of the old Llandudno parish outside the urban district.

Eglwysrhos and Llanrhos were both urban parishes and so did not have parish councils, but were directly administered by Llandudno Urban District Council and Conwy Borough Council respectively. The village of Llanrhos itself straddled the boundary between Llandudno Urban District and Conwy borough; the parish church and village school were in the Llandudno Urban District.

The parish of Eglwysrhos was abolished in 1905, merging with Llandudno parish to form an urban parish called "Llandudno cum Eglwysrhos" covering the same area as the Llandudno Urban District. The parish of Penrhyn was abolished in 1934, mostly being incorporated into Llandudno Urban District, with a smaller area added to Llanrhos.

Urban parishes were abolished in 1974, when communities were established instead, based on the urban districts or boroughs, which were also abolished. As such, Llanrhos parish became part of Conwy community, whilst Llandudno cum Eglwysrhos parish became the Llandudno community. The area was also transferred from Caernarfonshire to the Aberconwy district of Gwynedd at the same time. Further local government reform in 1996 saw the area become part of the principal area of Conwy County Borough.

== Notable buildings ==
=== Saint Hilary's Church ===
The Church in Wales parish church is dedicated to St Hilary and is in the diocese of St Asaph. It is said to have been erected on the site of a mid-6th-century church built by Maelgwn Gwynedd, whose castle was within the parish on the twin peaks at Deganwy. The church was rebuilt by the Cistercian monks of Aberconwy Abbey in 1282 and remained largely unchanged until extensive rebuilding in 1820 and 1865, paid for by the Mostyn family and local landowners. The rebuild incorporated the roof beams and many other features of the late medieval church and these are still in place. Local legend recounted by Thomas Pennant in his 1784 work A Tour in Wales, has it that Maelgwyn died at the church, having taken refuge there to avoid the yellow pestilence. The plague is colourfully said to have taken the form of a fair women with the powers of a basilisk, who slew Maelgwyn with a glance as he incautiously looked out of a window. He is said to have been buried beneath the south door. St Mary's well (Welsh: Ffynnon Santes Fair) is west of the church; once lost it was rediscovered after local flooding in June 1993, being excavated and restored the following year. It is said that Maelgwyn's church was originally dedicated to Saint Mary, before the Cistercians rebuilt and rededicated the holy site to Saint Hilary.

=== Gloddaeth Hall ===
The historic mansion of Gloddaeth Hall was the home of Iorwerth Goch of Creuddyn and pre-dates the 13th century conquest of Edward I. By 1460 it had become through marriage one of the homes of the Mostyn family, members of which lived there until about 1935 when it became a girls' boarding school, which closed in 1964. In 1965, Lord Mostyn transferred the lease to Saint David's College for boys, which is now co-educational.

=== Bodysgallen Hall ===
Bodysgallen Hall, within the village, home of its bachelor owner, Ievan Lloyd Mostyn, until his death in 1966, was sold in 1967 for £15,000 with the contents being sold for £35,000. Cadwallon Lawhir's 5th century AD residence ruins are extant atop a woodland knoll above the present Bodysgallen Hall (Williams, 1835). The square tower (non-defensive) has a five-storey, ascending anti-clock wise, extant spiral staircase, which yields commanding views to the north (Lumina Technologies, 2006). Bodysgallen Hall is now a five-star destination hotel.

=== The Mostyn Arms and the Queen's Head ===
The village was once home to two sizeable public houses, The Mostyn Arms and The Queen's Head. These buildings flanked the church to the north and south, a proximity which was to be their undoing when the pious Lady Augusta Mostyn ordered their demolition in the latter years of the 19th century. The adjacency of the public houses to her estate was another factor which hastened their demise, as Lady Mostyn felt the nearness of such temptations was hampering the productivity of her workers. In 1898 Lady Mostyn came to an arrangement with the owner of the Mostyn arms - Sam Hughes - providing him with a freehold a short distance to the north on which he could build a new premises. This building still stands today on the southern outskirts of Llandudno and is called The Links Hotel (Gwesty Links in Welsh).

=== Llanrhos Temperance Hotel ===
True to her convictions, in 1908 Lady Mostyn would go on to build a temperance house known as Llanrhos Temperance Hotel opposite the church, which later found use as a sub-post office. The building still stands and is now in use as a private residence.

=== Llanrhos Grange ===
Over the years Llanrhos Grange was also known as Bryn Lupus and Swinglehurst. It was a substantial 2-storied stucco building with grounds. It is notable for being the birthplace of famous mariner Harold Lowe, who was fifth officer on the RMS Titanic when she sank on her maiden voyage. Its last usage was as a convalescent home for men, run by the Manchester and Salford Hospital Saturday Fund and renamed after the eponymous chairman, Charles Swinglehurst. By 1965 the building had fallen into disrepair and was demolished. Bryn Lupus Road which runs east–west through the village, linking it with Deganwy, bears testament to the vanished building.

== Notable people associated with Llanrhos ==
- Maelgwn Gwynedd - 6th-century king of Gwynedd
- Harold Lowe - Fifth Officer and survivor of the RMS Titanic, born in Bryn Lupus House
- Lady Augusta Mostyn - philanthropist and artist
- Edith Rigby - suffragette
