= Ysgol y Creuddyn =

State school in Penrhyn Bay, Conwy County Borough, Wales

Ysgol Y Creuddyn

Location
- Ffordd Derwen; Penrhyn Bay, Conwy, LL30 3LB; Wales; 53.3111°N 3.7785°W

Information
- Type: State School
- Established: 1981; 45 years ago
- Local authority: Conwy
- Gender: All
- Age: 11 to 19
- Enrolment: 633 (2023)
- Houses: Bodysgallen, Gloddaeth, Penrhyn
- Colours: Green, yellow and red
- Website: moodle.creuddyn.conwy.sch.uk

Ysgol y Creuddyn (Welsh pronunciation: [ˈəskɔl ə ˈkrɛɨðɨn]) is a Welsh-medium secondary school in Penrhyn Bay, Conwy County Borough, Wales. The school was established on Wednesday 2 September, 1981, with 218 students. As of 2023, 633 pupils are enrolled.

The school is situated next to Glanwydden village and on the Creuddyn peninsula—after which it is named.

Students are bilingual, with all subjects taught in the Welsh language (except English and French) up to GCSE level. In 2024, 59.9 per cent of the pupils spoke Welsh at home.

The school is the predominant Welsh language school in the area, and it serves pupils from an area including Abergele, Colwyn Bay, Betws yn Rhos, Conwy, Llandudno, Llanfairfechan, Penmaenmawr and Eglwysbach. The school teaches children from the ages of 11 to 18.

== Notable former pupils ==
- Gwenno Mair Davies, Crown winner at the Urdd National Eisteddfod (and later head teacher of the school)
- Al Lewis, singer-songwriter
