= St David's College, Llandudno =

Private school in Llanrhos, north Wales

St David's College
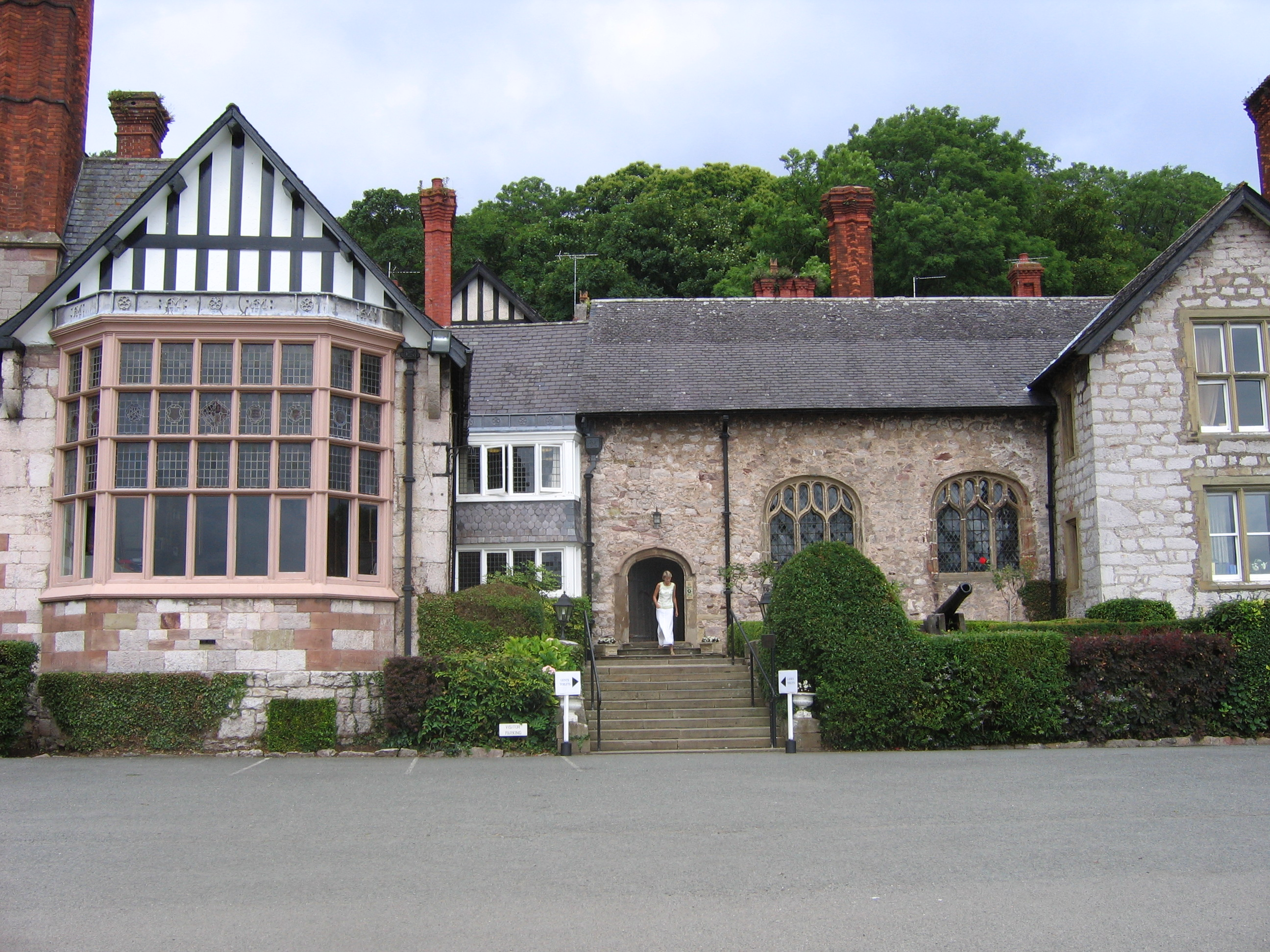

Location
- Gloddaeth Hall; Llanrhos, Conwy County Borough, LL30 1RD; Wales; 53°18′34″N 3°47′56″W

Information
- Type: Private day and boarding
- Religious affiliation: Christian
- Established: 1965
- Founder: John Mayor
- Local authority: Conwy County Borough
- Department for Education URN: 401971 Tables
- Chair: Peter Gaskell
- Headmaster: Andrew Russell
- Gender: Mixed
- Age: 9 to 19
- Enrolment: 310 (September 2023)
- Houses: Snowdon, Tryfan, Cader Idris
- Colours: Navy, Green, Yellow
- Website: www.stdavidscollege.co.uk

St David's College is a private, boarding and day, middle and high school occupying Gloddaeth Hall in Llanrhos, Llandudno, north Wales. The school was founded by John Mayor in 1965 with the aim of offering a whole-person education based on Christian principles and outdoor education. The school also supports children and young adults with learning difficulties and has a whole-school approach to dyslexia with emphasis on developing individual talents.

== Buildings ==
It occupies an eclectic variety of buildings such as Gloddaeth Hall, centred on the Minstrel Hall dating from the Tudor period, right up to Chelsea/Augusta Houses and the Keith Lennard Technology Centre, which have all been built in the last few years.

In 2022 the school began a £15 million refurbishment project. As part of this, the sports hall was demolished in 2022. The site where it stood is planned to be replaced with a performing arts centre. There are also plans to create new rugby and football pitches, and to restore the original chapel.

== Boarding houses ==
It has five boarding houses all situated on the campus grounds:

- Snowdon (Boys and Girls)
- Tryfan (Boys and Girls)
- Cader (Boys and Girls)
- Augusta (Girls)
- Hettie (Junior)

== Notable former pupils ==
- Cieren Fallon, jockey
- Jerry Moffatt, rock climber
- Edward Cadogan, 9th Earl Cadogan
