= Y Drych Cristianogawl =

First book printed in Wales

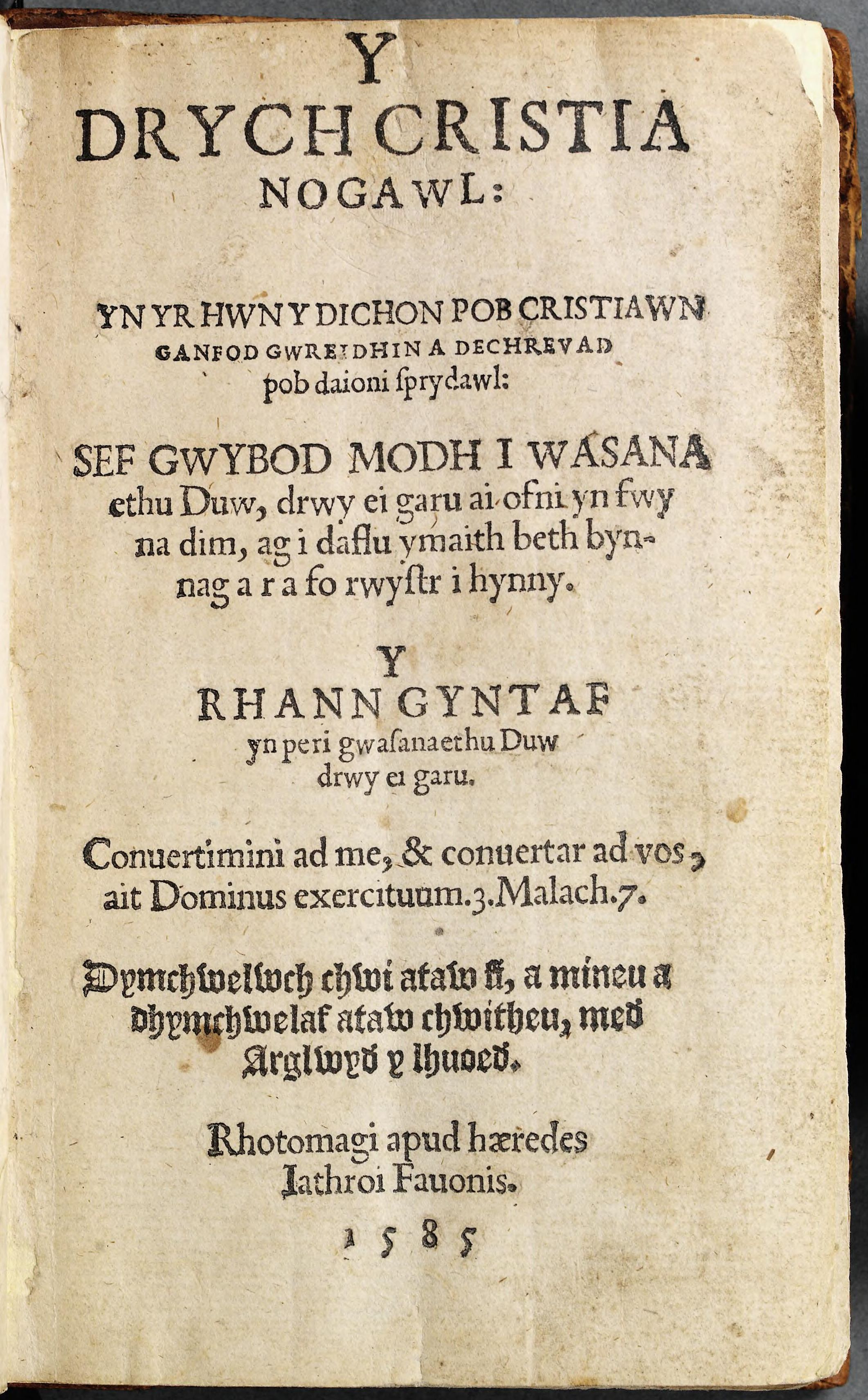
Y Drych Cristianogawl

Y Drych Cristianogawl (Welsh: Y Drych Cristnogol, The Christian Mirror) is a Welsh publication from the Elizabethan era and the first book to have been printed in Wales. It has been described as a short essay on the love of God by Gruffydd Robert and Elizabethan era martyr Blessed William Davies is believed to have been at least involved in its production.

Whilst Y Drych Cristianogawl was not the first book to be printed in the Welsh language, it was the first book to be printed in Wales. During most of the 16th century, the House of Tudor enforced strict censorship over both the publishers and the theatres, and the printing of Roman Catholic books in England, Ireland, and Wales as well as their importation from abroad was strictly prohibited by the Crown. As a result, in a 16th-century parallel to the strictly illegal samizdat literature that followed the Russian Revolution, Catholic literature was covertly copied by hand and distributed, usually in manuscript form. Y Drych Cristianogawl, however, was successfully published on a secret printing press and the first part was printed in 1585 by Roger Thackwell inside Rhiwledin cave, on the Little Orme, near the modern towns of Llandudno and Penrhyn Bay. Evidence of an illegal printing press was later found in the cave by Crown officials in 1587. The latter parts were not printed due to a government crackdown, but have survived in manuscript form.

Four original copies survive, of which the only perfect copy is held by the National Library of Wales and from which a replica was made and presented to Pope Benedict XVI during the 2010 Papal visit to the United Kingdom by the Bishop of Wrexham, Edwin Regan, as a gift to the Holy See from the Welsh people.

== See also ==
- Yny lhyvyr hwnn – The first book to be printed in the Welsh language
