= Penrhyn Bay =

Seaside town in Conwy, Wales

Coordinates: 53.314°N 3.770°W

Penrhyn Bay: Welsh: Bae Penrhyn
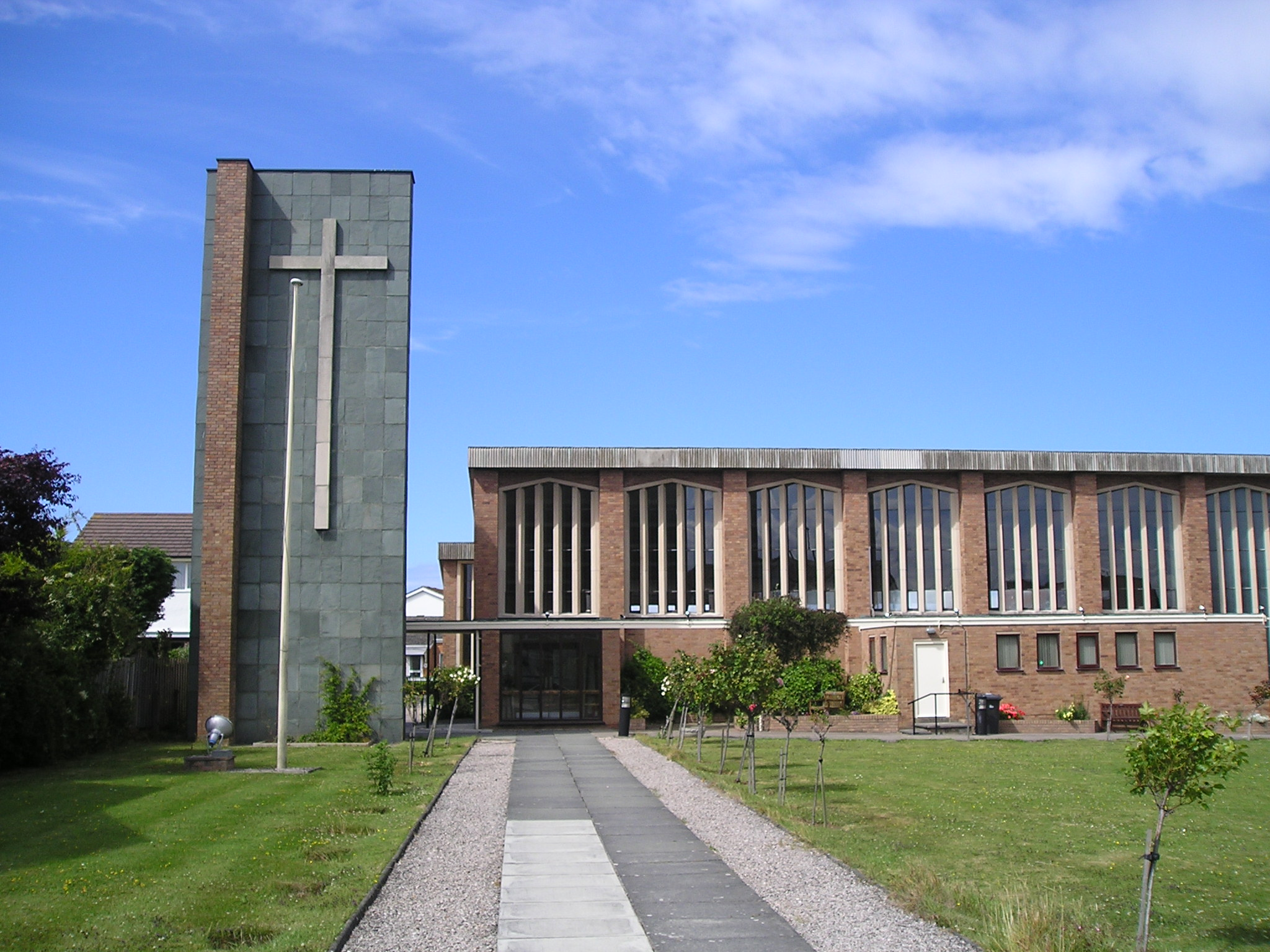
- The Church of Saint David in Penrhyn Bay (Parish of Llanrhos)

- Location within Conwy
- Population: 4,883 (2011)
- OS grid reference: SH822812
- Community: Llandudno
- Principal area: Conwy
- Country: Wales
- Sovereign state: United Kingdom
- Post town: Llandudno
- Postcode district: LL30
- Dialling code: 01492
- Police: North Wales
- Fire: North Wales
- Ambulance: Welsh
- UK Parliament: Bangor Aberconwy
- Senedd Cymru – Welsh Parliament: Aberconwy

Penrhyn Bay (Welsh: Bae Penrhyn "headland bay") is a seaside town on the northern coast of Wales, in Conwy county borough, within the parish or community of Llandudno, and part of the ecclesiastical parish of Llanrhos. It is a prosperous village, with a cluster of local shops, a pub, a parish church and a modern medical centre with doctors' surgery at the foot of the pass over the shoulder of the Little Orme from Llandudno Bay. Here there is a Welsh-medium primary school called Ysgol Glanwydden and a secondary school using the same medium of instruction called Ysgol y Creuddyn. It is considered to be a residential suburb of Llandudno lying east of the Little Orme. It adjoins the resort of Rhos-on-Sea and covers a large part of the Creuddyn peninsula. The population of Penrhyn Ward at the 2011 census was 4,883.

== History ==
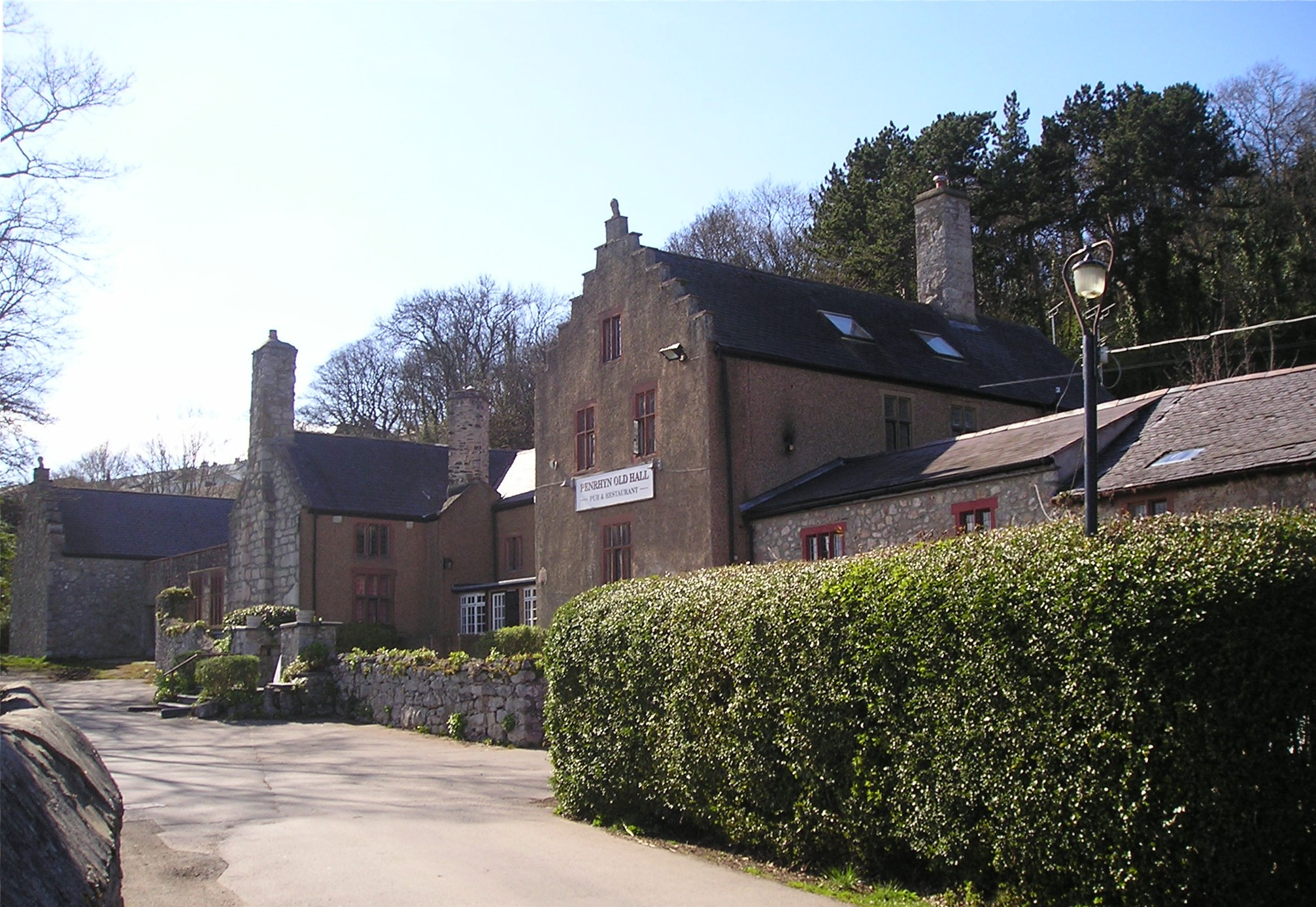
Penrhyn Old Hall at the foot of the Little Orme

The oldest building in Penrhyn Bay is Penrhyn Old Hall dating from the early 15th century. It was the home of the Pugh family whose fortunes faded through the high fines imposed for Recusancy and their staunch adherence to the Catholic Church in Wales, even when their tenants and neighbours increasingly conformed to Anglicanism. On 14 April 1587, printing material for Catholic Welsh-language literature was found in a cave on the Little Orme, where it is believed to have been used by Robert Pugh (squire of Penrhyn Hall) and his chaplain and future Catholic martyr William Davies to print Y Drych Cristianogawl ('The Christian Mirror'), one of the first books ever printed in the Welsh language. They had taken refuge there during the persecution of Catholics instigated by Queen Elizabeth I in May 1586.

On the grounds of the Penrhyn Hall are the ruins of a medieval chapel dedicated to the Blessed Virgin Mary of Penrhyn, last used by the Church in Wales for Anglican worship c.1930. The Pugh family also held a charter and built a windmill to serve their land in the nearby village of Glanwydden the first charter dating 1580. In addition to being the Welsh equivalent to Scalan, Penrhyn Hall is also important as the birthplace of Welsh-language Cavalier poet and collector of local oral tradition Gwilym Puw and now serves as both a village pub and restaurant.

Originally a small farming community, Penrhyn Bay came to rely heavily on the employment opportunities of the limestone quarry operating since the mid-19th century, and served by its own narrow gauge railway, but quarrying ceased in 1936. However, Penrhyn Bay expanded rapidly in the 20th century to become a desirable suburb of Llandudno, with developments taking place in the 1930s, 1950s and 1960s. Most recently, in the 1990s, further large development of family homes took place to the south of the town. The village also has a school called Ysgol Glanwydden which was built in 1910.
