= Margaret Lloyd (Moravian) =

Welsh Moravian worker (1709–1762)

- Born: 27 May 1709
- Died: 8 September 1762 (aged 53)

Margaret Lloyd (27 May 1709 – 8 September 1762) was a Welsh Moravian worker and activist, one of the early members of the Moravian congregation in London. Hailing from Llangystennin in North Wales, she was the brother of Robert Lloyd (1707–1753), who became rector of Aber. Lloyd moved to London and initially became a Wesleyan, but in 1740 she gravitated towards the Moravian church and became a full-time helper the following year.

In 1743, Lloyd was assigned to supervise the Moravian Church in Yorkshire. She married Thomas Moore in Yorkshire on 27 August 1744. Due to their activism against German autocracy at the mission, which led to them being outcast for a period from the Moravian church. They later became accepted by The Brethren Church, and Lloyd became renowned for her influence in the Moravian Brethren of North Wales. She died in Leeds on 8 September 1762 and was buried in the Brethren church cemetery in Fulneck.
