= Michael Alford (historian) =

Jesuit missionary and ecclesiastical historian (1587-1652)

Michael Alford (1587 – 11 August 1652) (real name Griffith) was an English Jesuit missionary and ecclesiastical historian. He left two major works, Britannia Illustrata, Annales Ecclesiastici et Civiles Britannorum also known as Annales Ecclesiae Britannicae.

== Life ==
Michael Alford was born in London in 1587. He entered the novitiate at Louvain in 1607. he studied philosophy at Seville and theology at Leuven. Subsequently, he was assigned to be a minister to English gentry, merchants, and sailors in Naples. From there he was sent to Rome. Around August 1621 he became rector at the Jesuit college in Ghent.

Late in 1628 or perhaps the subsequent year, he was sent to the English mission. Thomas Campbell says that Alford's real name was Griffith, and that he passed as John Flood, the aliases being used to escape detection. Upon landing at Dover he was mistakenly arrested on suspicion of being Father Richard Smith, Bishop of Chalcedon, for whose apprehension the government had offered a reward. A copy of Thomas s Kempis' Imitation of Christ was found on his person, thus arousing suspicion of his being a priest. His captors conveyed him to London, "but as his person in no respect corresponded with the description of the bishop, he was restored to liberty through the mediation of Queen Henrietta Maria".

The county of Leicester became the chief district of Father Alford's missionary work for the next thirty-three years. In 1636 he was appointed rector of the "Residence" of St Anne, comprising the county of Leicester. He resided at Holt, where he employed his leisure in composing his learned works. There is also a tradition that he was also at the covert College of St. Francis in Combe, Herefordshire, which held a considerable library.

In order to put the finishing stroke to his Annales Ecclesiae Britannicae he obtained leave to retire to the College of St. Omer in the spring of 1652, and while there he succumbed a fever on 11 August the same year. The annals were published in Liege in 1663, eleven years after his death.
