= Bryn Pydew =

Village in Conwy County Borough, Wales

Coordinates: 53.296°N 3.790°W

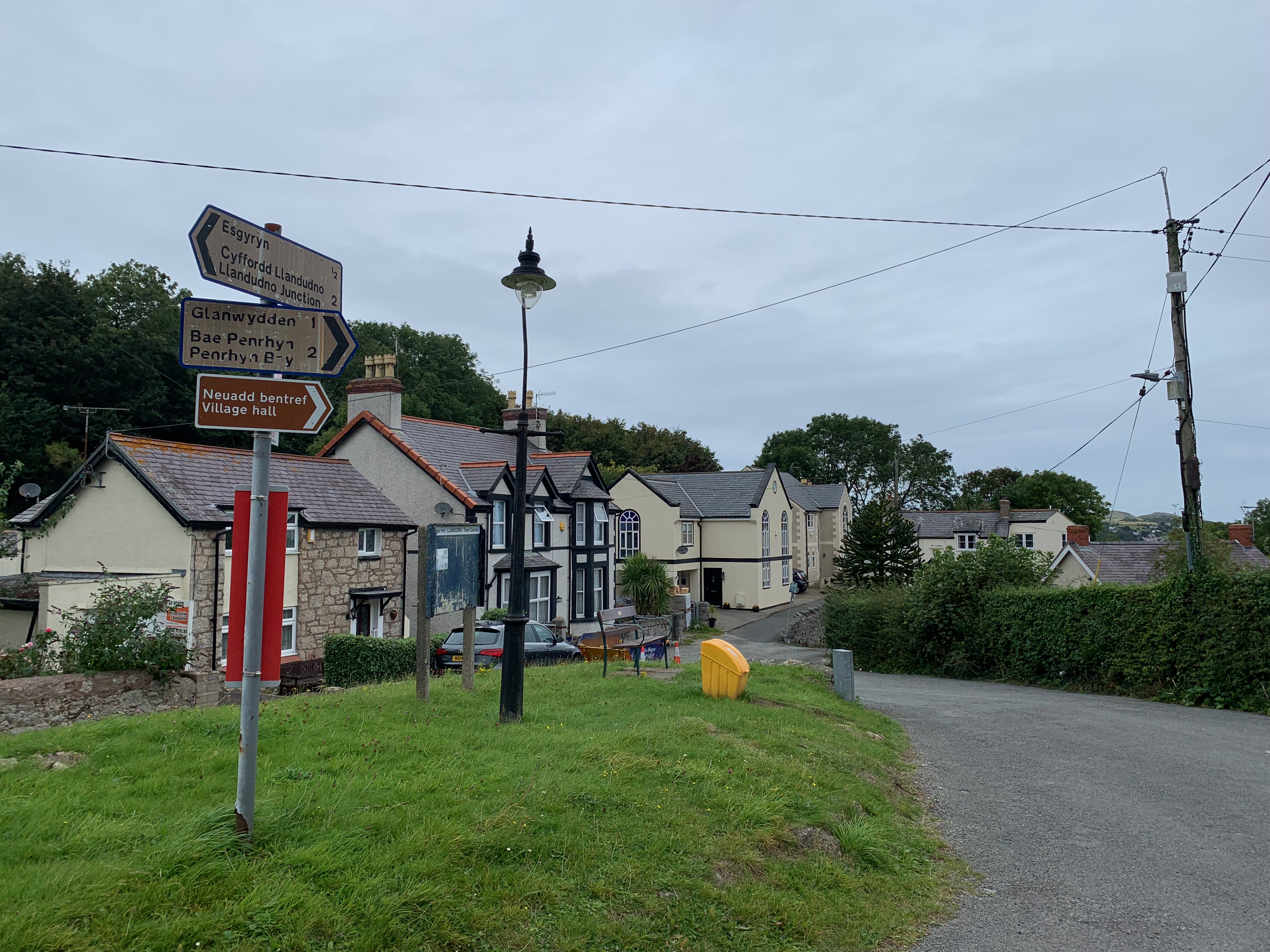
- Bryn Pydew village

- Location within Conwy
- Population: 451 (2011)
- Community: Conwy
- Principal area: Conwy
- Preserved county: Clwyd
- Country: Wales
- Sovereign state: United Kingdom
- Post town: CONWY
- Postcode district: LL31
- Dialling code: 01492
- Police: North Wales
- Fire: North Wales
- Ambulance: Welsh
- UK Parliament: Bangor Aberconwy
- Senedd Cymru – Welsh Parliament: Aberconwy

Bryn Pydew is a small settlement to the east of Llandudno Junction in North Wales. The limestone hill of Bryn Pydew reaches 128 metres (420 feet) above sea level. At the 2011 census the population was 451. Bodysgallen Hall is nearby.

Bryn Pydew is home to one of the 36 sites of the North Wales Wildlife Trust, in addition to the nearby Marl Hall Woods.

== Transport ==
Bryn Pydew used to have a daily scheduled bus service for many years. The village is now only served by buses three times per week: Tuesday, Wednesday and Thursday, operating on request only.
