= Glanwydden =

Village in Conwy County Borough, Wales

Coordinates: 53.306°N 3.776°W

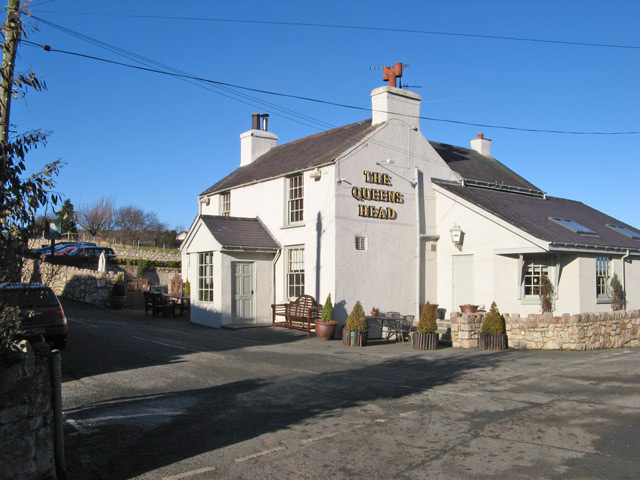
- The Queens Head public house, Glanwydden

- Location within Conwy
- OS grid reference: SH816802
- Community: Llandudno
- Principal area: Conwy
- Country: Wales
- Sovereign state: United Kingdom
- Post town: LLANDUDNO JUNCTION
- Postcode district: LL31
- Dialling code: 01492
- Police: North Wales
- Fire: North Wales
- Ambulance: Welsh
- UK Parliament: Bangor Aberconwy
- Senedd Cymru – Welsh Parliament: Bangor Conwy Môn

Glanwydden is a small village located between Llandudno and Colwyn Bay in Conwy county borough, north Wales.

== Amenities & History ==
The village has one pub and around 30 houses. It was the centre of the limestone quarry trade in the 17th century with most of the stone being used to build the hotels in Llandudno.

The village predates the quarries with a windmill and storage house whose charter dates from 1580. The Pub "the QueensHead" was votes Wales best pub 2009

The village played host to the Urdd Eisteddfod in May 2008. The village used to have a school from 1875-1905 until the new school opened on Derwen Lane. The village has a small chapel that dates back to 1790. The local dairy, opposite the Queens head, has been demolished.

There is a windmill that stands in the village, and is now a family home. There is evidence in Aberystwyth that the first Royal Charter, granted to the Wynne family for the construction of a windmill on the site in 1580. It is reputed to be the largest based windmill in wales. The first reference to a windmill is in the 1590s when Sir Robert Sailsbury of Bachymyd Hall leased it to William Sailsbury of Glanwydden. It was probably rebuilt in 1668 by the Sailsburys, as it was part of their estate. Under the influence of the Morris family of Llanfihangel Tre'r Beirdd, it was again modified in 1704. The Morris family had business in the area and had also married into the Sailsbury family. This is a possible interpretation of the date above the main doors which is S.R.M. -668/1704. During the 18th century, the windmill came into the hands of the Davis family.

During the first half of the 20th century it was completely gutted and then used as a cow shed. It was reported in 1956 by the Royal Commission for Ancient Monuments as being 25 feet in internal diameter at the base and built of limestone rubble. The remnants of the windmill which stood on the slightly sloping mound were sold off during the 1980s and were incorporated into a detached house. The Mill fell into disuse in the late industrial era, when steam powered mills in Manchester and Liverpool superseded most wind powered flour production. Local stories say the sails for the mill fell off during the later days of the first world war killing a pig. The mill was then plundered for its stone for local buildings. Only the base part of the mill remaining and used as a sheep fold by local farmers. In the 1980s the Windmill way sympathetically restored and is now a family home. There is still evidence of its working past in the gardens of the house with three large pieces of mill stone uncovered and on display.

Built in 1857 Glan Morfa house, on the outskirts of the village, was built by the Parry family using the local limestone. Lady Erskine lived at the property in the 1930s. The present owners (Griffiths family) great-great-grandfather was the local cobbler and would visit local houses to collect shoes to mend. In the 1980s "Bessie's" riding stable was a local hub for learner and experienced riders. This was next to the Queens head pub where some listed outbuildings remain.

== See also ==
- Penrhyn Bay
