= Cerdd dafod =

Welsh poetry tradition

Cerdd dafod (literally "tongue craft") is the Welsh tradition of creating verse or poetry to a strict metre in the Welsh language.

== History ==
The history of cerdd dafod can be traced to 6th-century Welsh poets such as Aneirin and Taliesin, but is probably much older. Studies also suggest that features of this form of poetry are comparable to the ancient Irish versifications and therefore point to an older shared Celtic inheritance. Since the 14th century the composition of cerdd dafod has required strict observance of the rules of cynghanedd: an intricate system of sound arrangement based on stress, alliteration, and internal rhyme within each line.

One of the earliest texts on the subject is credited to Einion Offeiriad (fl c. 1320–c. 1349) a bard considered to have been under the patronage of Sir Rhys ap Gruffydd, a powerful nobleman of south-west Wales. In it, he lists 24 canonical metres used for all poems in the writing of cerdd dafod. This was later revised by Dafydd ab Edmwnd who, at an eisteddfod held at Carmarthen around 1450, changed two of Einion's metres to two more complicated versions of his own. These changes were adopted by future competitions as the preferred canon.

In 1925 the Celtic linguist Sir John Morris-Jones published Cerdd Dafod in Welsh, an in-depth study of the traditional practice of cynghanedd and a text now seen as the definitive work on the topic. This was brought about as a result of his desire to see a return to traditional poetry and use of strict metre in eisteddfodau.

The end of the 20th century saw a renaissance in cerdd dafod, especially in the metres known as englyn and cywydd, attributed to the poet Alan Llwyd.

== Bibliography ==
- Davies, John; Jenkins, Nigel; Menna, Baines; Lynch, Peredur I., eds. (2008). The Welsh Academy Encyclopaedia of Wales. Cardiff: University of Wales Press. ISBN 978-0-7083-1953-6.

== See also ==
- Traditional Welsh poetic metres
