= Gloddaeth Hall =

Country house in Llandudno, Conwy, Wales

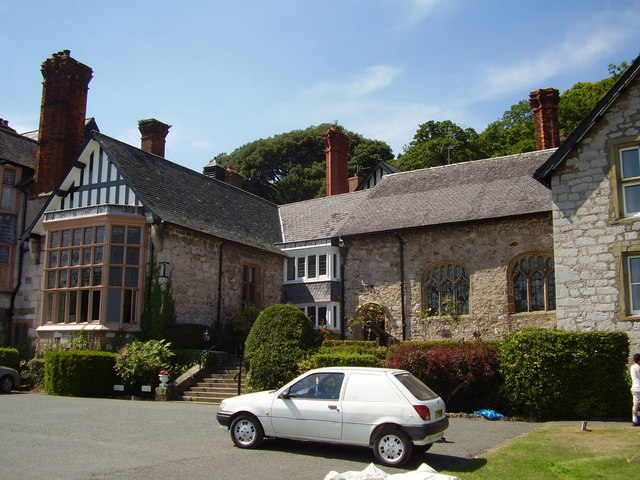
- Gloddaeth Hall

- Location within Wales
- Alternative names: St David's College

General information
- Location: Llandudno, Llandudno, Wales
- Coordinates: 53°18′34″N 03°47′54″W
- Elevation: 62m

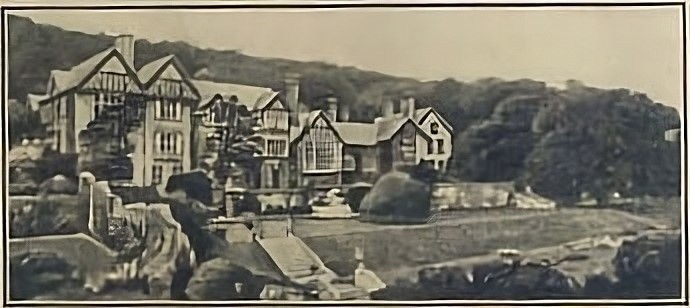
Gloddaeth Hall of the Mostyn family, 1935

Gloddaeth Hall originated as a large country house in Llandudno, Caernarfonshire (now Conwy), Wales. It is designated by Cadw as a Grade I listed building. It stands on land which had been owned by the Mostyn family since the 15th century.

The core of the building is a 16th-century hall and two storey solar block, built of stone rubble with freestone dressings. There are gabled stone slate roofs. The hall is open to the hammer beam roof. The lower room of the solar has 16th century panelling, the upper room has a 17th century panelling. A wing to the east was added around 1700.

In the 19th century, further additions were made to the building by William Nesfield, and John Douglas, who designed a new west wing for Augusta, Lady Mostyn in 1889.

A 17th century dovecote remains. Some elements of the formal gardens to the south-east may also be 17th century. The gardens are designated Grade I on the Cadw/ICOMOS Register of Parks and Gardens of Special Historic Interest in Wales.

The hall now forms part of St David's College, a mixed sex independent boarding and day school for pupils aged 9–19. Tennis player Angela Buxton attended school at Gloddaeth Hall.

== See also ==
- List of houses and associated buildings by John Douglas
