= Little Orme =

Headland in Conwy County Borough, Wales

Coordinates: 53°19′29″N 3°46′43″W

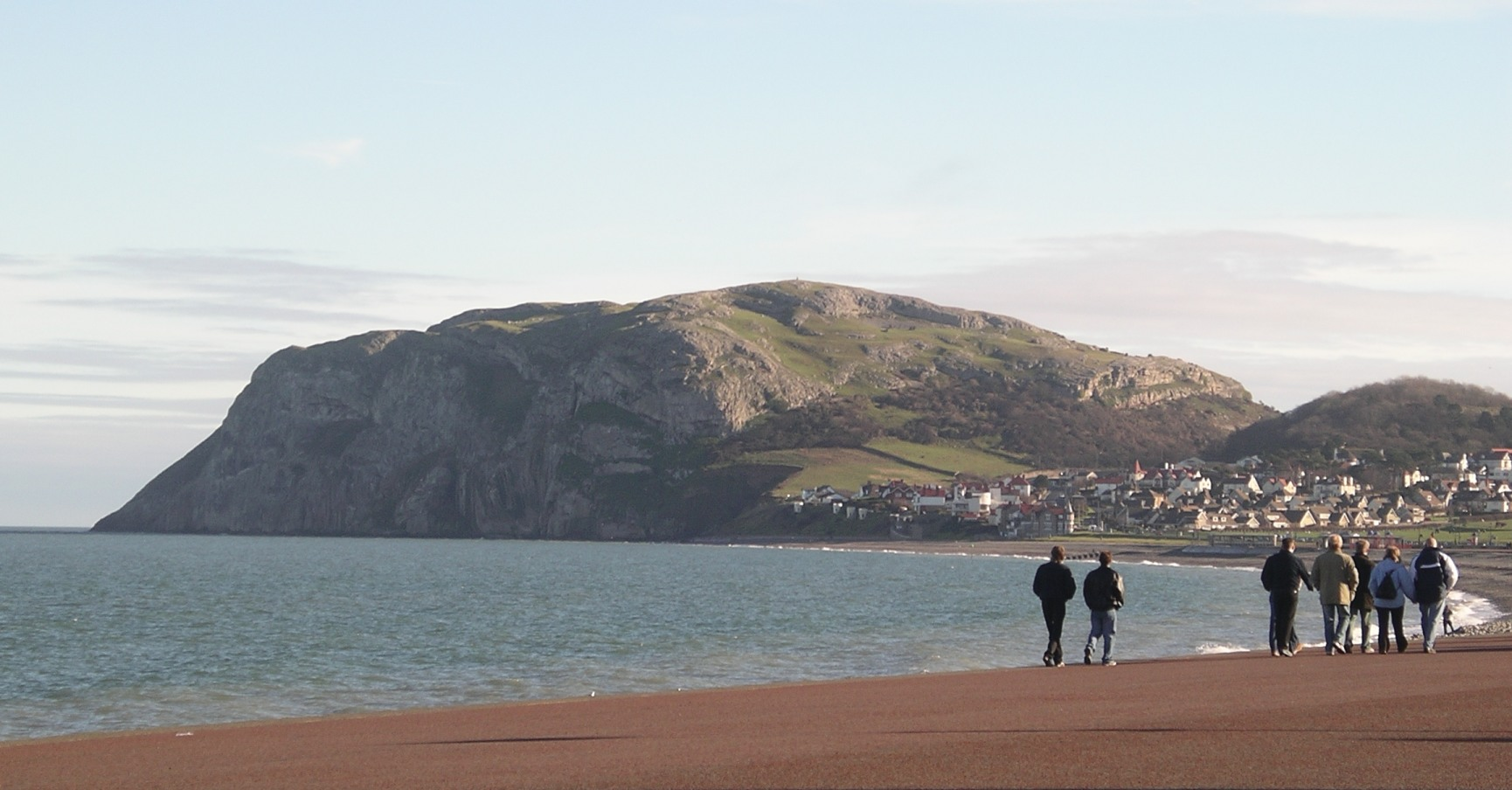
The Little Orme from Llandudno Promenade, January 29, 2005

The Little Orme (Welsh: Rhiwledyn, also known as Trwyn y Fuwch, Trwyn y Gogarth and Y Gogarth Fach) is a headland in Llandudno, Wales. It is 141 metres (463 ft) in height. It is one of two headlands situated at either end of Llandudno Bay, the other larger headland used by tourists is the Great Orme. The Little Orme has public footpaths and two summits, the higher summit has a trig point.

== History ==
The Little Orme was inhabited during the Mesolithic and Neolithic eras, notably the Pant y Wennol cave.

A small hoard of Iron Age Celtic metalwork was found in a cave on the Little Orme.

The medieval chapel of Blessed Mary of Penrhyn, abandoned in 1930 and now in ruins, is at the foot of the Little Orme in the grounds of Penrhyn Hall at Penrhyn Bay.

On 14 April 1587, printing material for Catholic literature was found in a cave on the Little Orme, where it had been used by the recusant Robert Pugh (squire of Penrhyn Hall) and his Chaplain Father William Davies to print Y Drych Cristianogawl (The Christian Mirror), the first book to be printed in Wales. They had taken refuge there during the persecution of Catholics instigated by Queen Elizabeth I in May 1586.

The Royal Artillery coastal gunnery school, 198 battery, was posted to Little Orme during the Second World War. Target practice was undertaken from the headland to anchored boats, and unspent ammunition and unexploded shells may still be encountered offshore. Gun emplacements and ancillary buildings were in situ until at least the early 1960s, but the site has since been landscaped.

== Ecology and environment ==
Parts of the Little Orme (notably the NWWT's Rhiwledyn Nature Reserve) are a Site of Special Scientific Interest. The North Wales Bird Trust is located on its lower slopes, and the Little Orme is a warden-patrolled sanctuary for sea birds, including European Shag and Common Guillemot. Bird viewing around the cliffs can be facilitated by trips using small boats.

Seals visit the headland and can be seen at Angel Bay (Porth Dyniewaid) during the breeding season.

== Uses ==
Unlike the Great Orme, the Little Orme has not been developed for copper mining or tourism. There has been limestone quarrying since the mid-19th century on the Penrhyn Bay side, where the Little Ormes Head Quarry tramway was situated. It was centred on Porth Dyniewyd and served by its own narrow gauge railway, but quarrying ceased in 1936. There is some farming on the lower slopes.

The North Wales Path runs across the Little Orme, using the several public footpaths on its summit.

The cliffs are a popular challenge for highly experienced rock climbers. The Coast Guard Rescue Unit use the Little Orme for training. Otherwise, it is a popular sightseeing location and walking/hiking site.

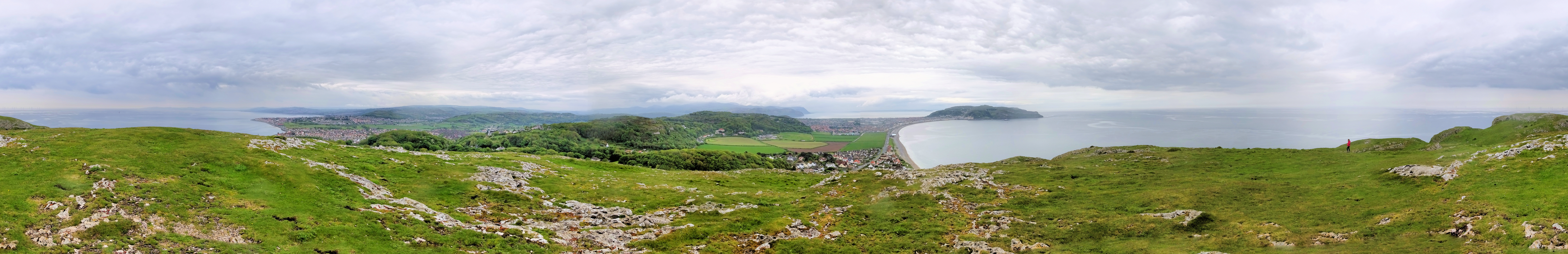
