= List of places in Conwy County Borough (categorised) =

This is a categorised list of places in Conwy County Borough, north Wales. See the list of places in Wales for places in other principal areas.

== Administrative divisions ==
=== Electoral wards ===
See the article on electoral wards for an explanation of this list. Prior to May 2022 the county borough wards were as follows:

- Abergele-Pensarn
- Betws-y-Coed
- Betws-yn-Rhos
- Bryn
- Caerhun
- Capelulo
- Colwyn
- Conwy
- Craig-y-Don (Llandudno)
- Crwst
- Deganwy
- Eglwysbach
- Eirias
- Gele
- Glyn
- Gogarth (Llandudno)
- Gower
- Kinmel Bay
- Llanddulas
- Llandrillo-yn-Rhos
- Llangernyw
- Llansanffraid
- Llansannan
- Llysfaen
- Marl
- Mochdre
- Mostyn (Llandudno)
- Pandy
- Pant-yr-Afon/Penmaenan
- Penrhyn, Llandudno (Llandudno)
- Pensarn
- Pentre Mawr
- Rhiw
- Towyn
- Trefriw
- Tudno (Llandudno)
- Uwch Conwy
- Uwchaled

From the May 2022 elections, the number of wards were reduced from 38 to 30:

- Betws-y-Coed and Trefriw
- Betws-yn-Rhos
- Bryn
- Caerhun
- Colwyn
- Conwy
- Craig-y-Don
- Deganwy
- Eglwys-bach a Llangernyw
- Eirias
- Gele and Llanddulas
- Glyn
- Glyn y Marl
- Gogarth Mostyn
- Kinmel Bay
- Llandrillo-yn-Rhos
- Llanrwst a Llanddoged
- Llansanffraid
- Llansannan
- Llysfaen
- Mochdre
- Pandy
- Pen-sarn Pentre Mawr
- Penmaenmawr
- Penrhyn, Llandudno
- Rhiw
- Tudno
- Tywyn
- Uwch Aled
- Uwch Conwy

=== Communities ===
This is a list of local communities:

- Abergele
- Betws yn Rhos
- Betws-y-Coed
- Bro Garmon
- Bro Machno
- Caerhun
- Capel Curig
- Cerrigydrudion
- Colwyn Bay
- Conwy
- Dolgarrog
- Dolwyddelan
- Eglwysbach
- Henryd
- Kinmel Bay and Towyn
- Llanddoged and Maenan
- Llanddulas and Rhyd-y-Foel
- Llandudno
- Llanfair Talhaiarn
- Llanfairfechan
- Llanfihangel Glyn Myfyr
- Llangernyw
- Llangwm
- Llannefydd
- Llanrwst
- Llansanffraid Glan Conwy
- Llansannan
- Llysfaen
- Mochdre
- Old Colwyn
- Penmaenmawr
- Pentrefoelas
- Rhos-on-Sea
- Trefriw
- Ysbyty Ifan

== See also ==
- List of places in Conwy County Borough
