= List of places in Conwy County Borough =

Map of places in Conwy County Borough compiled from this list
See the list of places in Wales for places in other principal areas.

This is a list of towns and villages in Conwy County Borough, Wales.

== A ==
- Abergele

== B ==
- Betws-y-Coed
- Betws yn Rhos
- Bodelwyddan

== C ==
- Capel Curig
- Capel Garmon
- Cefn Brith
- Cerrigydrudion
- Colwyn Bay
- Conwy

== D ==
- Deganwy
- Dolgarrog
- Dolwyddelan
- Dwygyfylchi

== E ==
- Eglwysbach

== G ==
- Glan Conwy
- Glasfryn
- Groes
- Gwytherin

== K ==
- Kinmel Bay

== L ==
- Llanbedr-y-Cennin
- Llanddoged
- Llanddulas
- Llandudno
- Llandudno Junction
- Llanfairfechan
- Llanfair Talhaiarn
- Llangernyw
- Llanrhychwyn
- Llanrwst
- Llysfaen

== M ==
- Maenan
- Melin-y-Coed
- Mochdre

== N ==
- Nant-y-Rhiw
- Nebo

== O ==
- Old Colwyn

== P ==
- Pandy Tudur
- Penmachno
- Penmaenmawr
- Penrhyn Bay
- Pentrefoelas

== R ==
- Rhos-on-Sea
- Rowen

== T ==
- Tal-y-bont
- Tal-y-Cafn
- Trefriw
- Ty'n-y-Groes
- Towyn

== Y ==
- Ysbyty Ifan

== See also ==
- List of places in Conwy county borough (categorised)
