= Marl (Conwy electoral ward) =

Former electoral ward of Conwy, Wales

Coordinates: 53.290°N 3.812°W

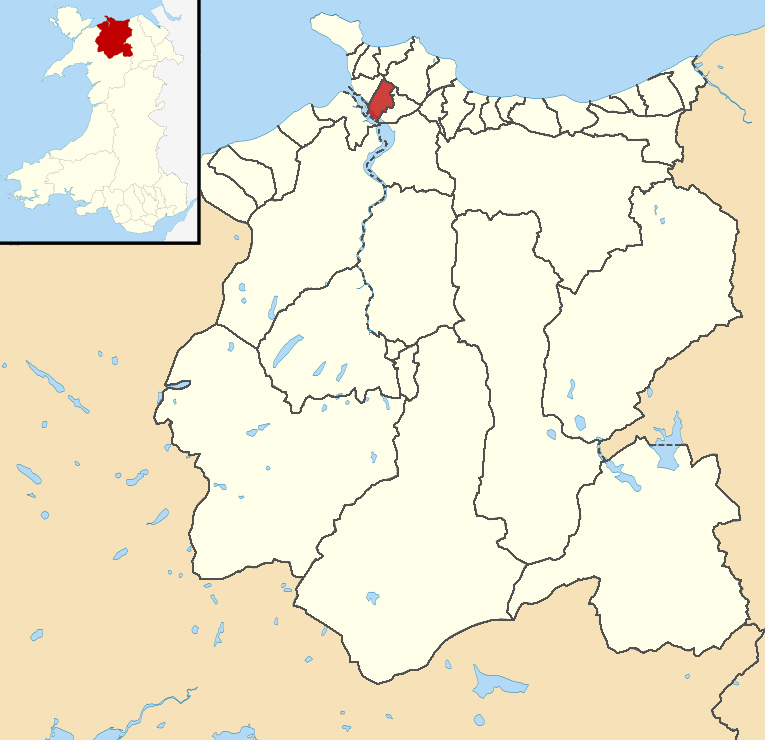
Location of the pre-2022 Marl ward within Conwy County Borough

Marl is one of the electoral wards in the community of Conwy, Conwy County Borough, Wales. It elects councillors to Conwy Town Council and, until 2022, also elected representatives to Conwy County Borough Council.

== Description ==
The Marl ward covers part of the town of Llandudno Junction to the east of the River Conwy. The wards of Deganwy and Pensarn border Marl, also to the east of the river. Conwy ward lies on the opposite side of the river, including the walled town of Conwy. To the north of Marl is the Llandudno ward of Penrhyn.

The county borough ward elected two councillors to Conwy County Borough Council.

According to the 2011 UK Census the population of the Marl ward was 3,879.

Following a ward boundary review, the county borough ward of Marl was merged with the neighbouring Pensarn (the most under-represented ward in the county borough) to create a new ward of Glyn y Marl. The new ward would elect three councillors to Conwy County Borough Council, from May 2022.

== County council elections ==
The ward elected two county councillors to Conwy County Borough Council and, at the May 2017 election, one seat was won by the Welsh Liberal Democrats and the other by the Welsh Labour Party. The Labour councillor, Mike Priestly, had previously represented the ward since 2004 as a Liberal Democrat. He had defected to the Labour Party in 2014 and, being a former trade union official, described it as "coming back to my roots". Local chiropodist Sue Shotter had won her seat from the Conservatives at a by-election in January 2011 and held it ever since.

=== 2017 ===
2017 Conwy County Borough Council election
Party	Candidate	Votes	%	±%
Labour	Mike Priestley *	953	32.8	
Liberal Democrats	Sue Shotter *	667	23.0	
Labour	Bill Chapman	510	17.6	
Conservative	Helen Roberts	417	14.4	
Conservative	Eva Leonie Roberts	358	12.3	
Turnout		2905	44.5	
Labour gain from Liberal Democrats		Swing		
Liberal Democrats hold		Swing		

=== 2012 ===
2012 Conwy County Borough Council election
Party	Candidate	Votes	%	±%
Liberal Democrats	Mike Priestley *	909	39.6	
Liberal Democrats	Sue Shotter *	683	29.7	
Labour	Bill Chapman	324	14.1	
Conservative	Beverley Anne James	225	9.8	
Conservative	Karen Marie Jones	157	6.8	
Turnout		2298	41.0	
Liberal Democrats hold		Swing		
Liberal Democrats hold		Swing		

* = sitting councillor prior to the election

=== 2011 by-election ===
A by-election took place on Thursday 20 January 2011, after Conservative councillor Linda Hurr had stood down on health grounds.

2011 Marl ward by-election
Party	Candidate	Votes	%	±%
Liberal Democrats	Sue Shotter	389		
Conservative	Julie Fallon	270		
Labour	Michael Pritchard	216		
Independent	Jason Landy	87		
Liberal Democrats gain from Conservative		Swing		

== Town Council elections ==
For the purposes of elections to Conwy Town Council, Marl ward elects or co-opts a total of four town councillors.

== See also ==
- List of places in Conwy County Borough (categorised)
