= Crwst =

Electoral ward in Conwy, Wales

Coordinates: 53.143°N 3.801°W

- Electoral ward
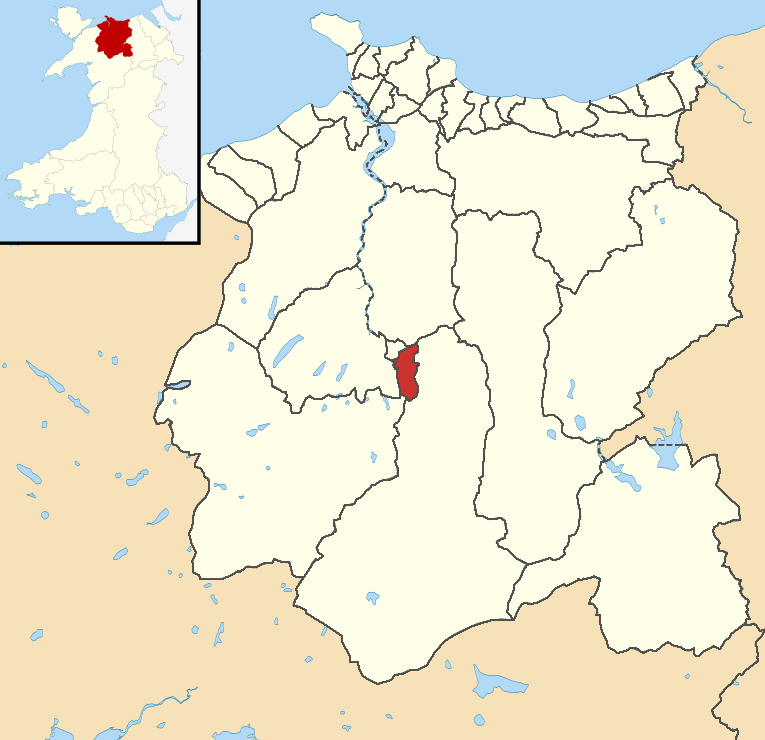
- Location of Crwst ward in Conwy County Borough

- Location within Conwy
- Country: Wales
- County Borough: Conwy
- Town: Llanrwst

Population (2011)
  - Total: 2,118

Crwst is an electoral ward in the town of Llanrwst, Conwy County Borough, Wales. It covers the southern part of the town, with its western border defined by the River Conwy and its northern border (dividing it from Llanrwst's Gower ward) defined by the Nant y Fedwen.

According to the 2011 UK Census, the population of the ward was 2,118.

== County council elections ==
The ward elects a county councillor to Conwy County Borough Council.

Independent councillor, Edgar Parry, was elected at the May 2012 election, with 317 votes.

At the May 2017 election, the seat was won by Aaron Wynne for Plaid Cymru, beating the incumbent Independent, Edgar Parry, and the Welsh Liberal Democrats' Baroness Christine Humphreys.

When elected in 2017, Councillor Wynne became Wales's youngest county councillor and Conwy County Borough Council's youngest ever elected member.

== See also ==
- List of places in Conwy County Borough (categorised)
