= Gele (electoral ward) =

Community electoral ward in Conwy, Wales

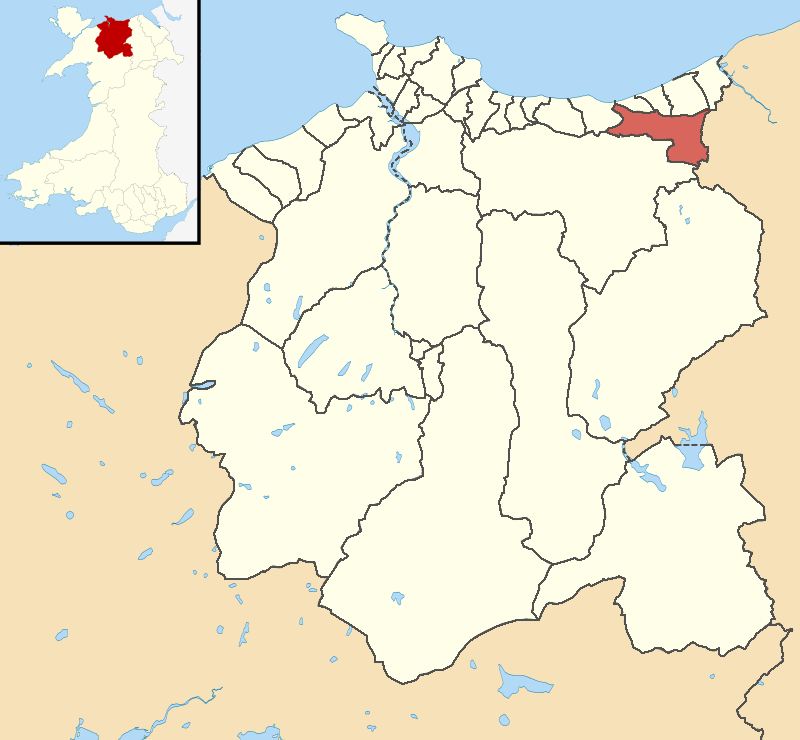
Location of Gele ward within Conwy County Borough

Gele was one of the electoral wards to Conwy County Borough Council and remains a community ward for the town council of Abergele, Conwy County Borough, Wales. It covers the southern part of the town and a more rural area to the southeast including the settlement of St George. It takes its name from the River Gele which runs through the western part of the ward.

As of 2016 the estimated ward population of the ward was about 4,600, with 22.7% able to speak Welsh.

== County council elections ==
The ward elected three county councillors to Conwy County Borough Council and, at the May 2017 election, the seats were won by Independent councillor David Wood and Conservative Party councillors Mark Baker and Pauline Heap-Williams. It has been represented by a wide variety of political parties since 1995, including a Liberal Democrat (1995-2004) and a Plaid Cymru representative (2012–17).

In December 2022 after Cllr Andrew Wood was re-elected to represent the new ward, Gele and Llanddulas, it was reported that he had broken the law by voting by operating his phone whilst driving, an opposition councillor described it as being "completely reckless".

=== 2017 ===
2017 Conwy County Borough Council election
Party	Candidate	Votes	%	±%
Independent	Andrew David Wood *	1,166	26.5	
Conservative	Mark Edward Baker	801	18.2	
Conservative	Pauline Susan Heap-Williams	740	16.8	
Conservative	Lynn Cunnah-Watson	676	15.4	
Plaid Cymru	Delyth Ann MacRae *	588	13.4	
Independent	Morris Roberts	422	9.6	
Turnout		1837	48.5	
Independent hold		Swing		
Conservative hold		Swing		
Conservative gain from Plaid Cymru		Swing		

=== 2012 ===
2012 Conwy County Borough Council election
Party	Candidate	Votes	%	±%
Independent	Andrew David Wood	1,026	26.0	
Conservative	Tim Rowlands *	746	18.9	
Plaid Cymru	Delyth Ann MacRae	537	13.6	
Conservative	John Pitt *	535	13.6	
No party name given	Ron Peacock *^{[a]}	409	10.4	
Labour	Dr Graham Edward Lawle	385	9.8	
Plaid Cymru	Bryan Anthony Kinsey	301	7.6	
Turnout		1759	45.0	
Independent gain from Conservative		Swing		
Conservative hold		Swing		
Plaid Cymru gain from Conservative		Swing		

* = sitting councillor prior to the election
^{[a]} = elected as a Conservative at the 2008 election

== Town Council ==
Gele is a community ward to Abergele Town Council, electing six town councillors.

== See also ==
- List of places in Conwy County Borough (categorised)
