= Gower (Llanrwst electoral ward) =

Electoral ward in Conwy, Wales

Coordinates: 53.143°N 3.801°W

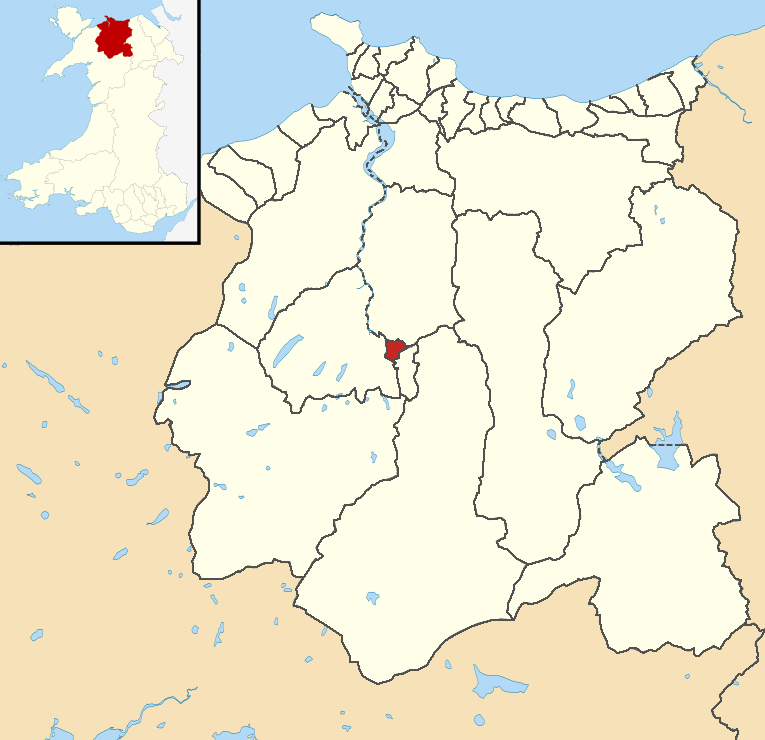
Location of pre-2022 Gower ward within Conwy County Borough

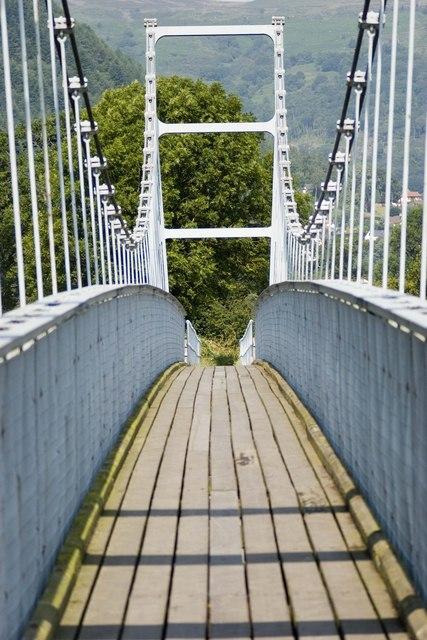
Gower Bridge over the Afon Conwy

Gower is one of the electoral wards of town of Llanrwst, Conwy County Borough, Wales. It covers the northern part of the town, with its western border defined by the River Conwy and its southern border (dividing it from Llanrwst's Crwst ward) defined by the Nant y Fedwen.

The ward is named after the Rev John Gower, rector of Trefriw for 43 years from 1869, who had built in 1881 the road and bridge connecting the village with Llanrwst.

According to the 2011 UK Census the population of the ward was 1,205.

== County council elections ==
The ward elects a county councillor to Conwy County Borough Council and, at the May 2017 election, the seat was won by Robert Jenkins for Plaid Cymru. It has been represented continuously by Plaid Cymru since 1995.

Gower ward became newsworthy in June 2004 when the sitting councillor, 74 year old Dafydd Parry Jones, collapsed and died while out campaigning in the county council election. Cllr Jones had been Gower's representative since 1996 and had been chair of the county council in 1998 and leader of the council's Plaid Cymru group. The election in the ward was subsequently postponed to 22 July.

== Town council ==
Gower is a ward to Llanrwst Town Council, represented by six of the 13 town councillors.

== See also ==
- List of places in Conwy County Borough (categorised)
