= Uwch Conwy =

Ward in Conwy County Borough, Wales

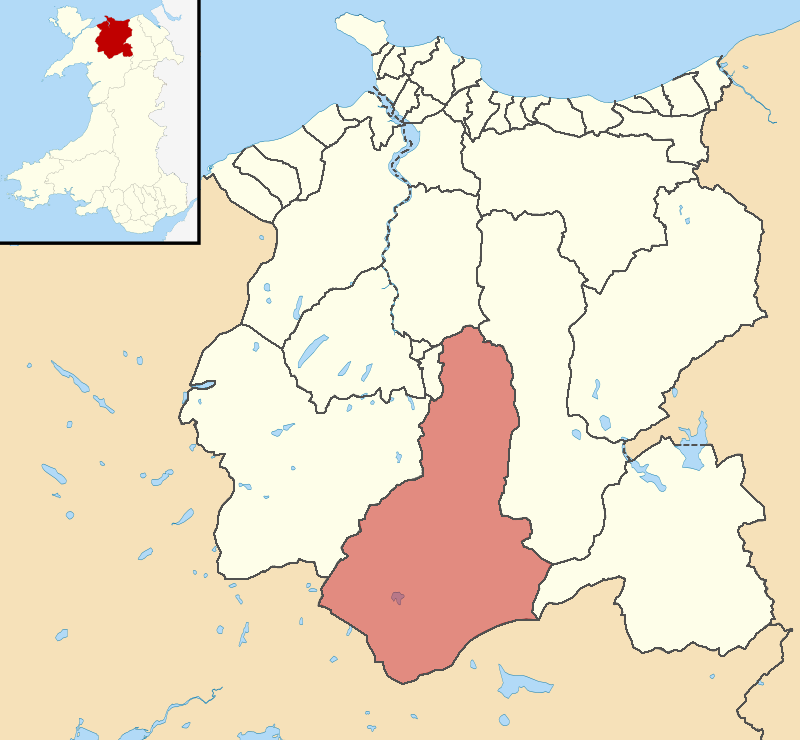
Location of the Uwch Conwy ward within Conwy County Borough

Uwch Conwy is an electoral ward in the southern central part of Conwy County Borough, Wales. It covers three communities, of Bro Garmon, Bro Machno and Ysbyty Ifan.

According to the 2011 UK Census the population of the ward was 1,465.

== County council elections ==
The ward elects a county councillor to Conwy County Borough Council and, at the May 2017 election, the seat was won by Wyn Ellis Jones for Plaid Cymru. The seat has been represented by Plaid Cymru since 1999. Cllr Jones took the seat unopposed in May 2004, subsequently being elected unopposed in May 2008 and May 2012.

== See also ==
- List of places in Conwy County Borough (categorised)
