= Llandrillo yn Rhos (electoral ward) =

Electoral ward in Conwy, Wales

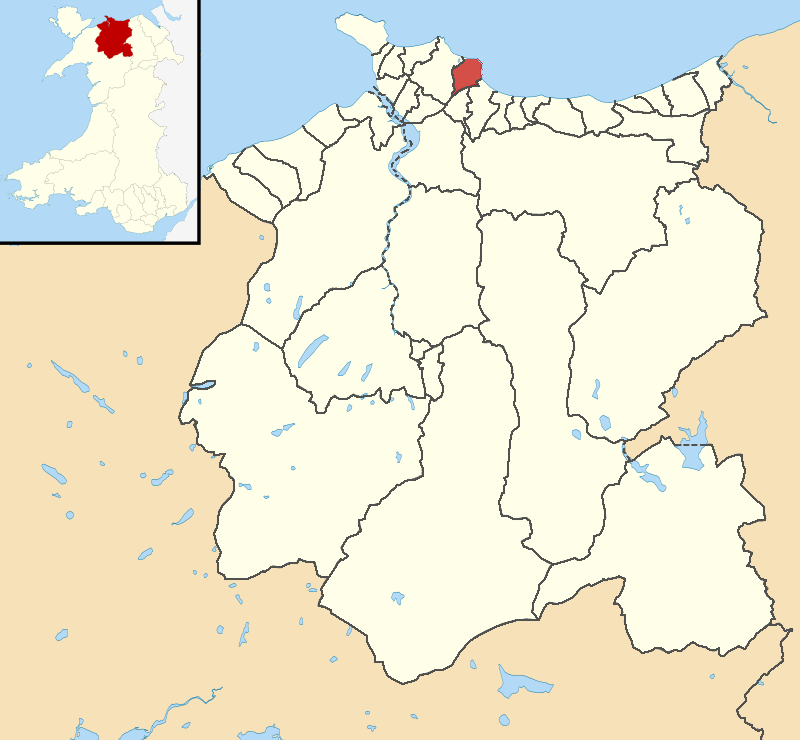
Location of the Llandrillo-yn-Rhos ward within Conwy County Borough

Llandrillo yn Rhos is an electoral ward in Conwy County Borough, Wales. Its boundaries are coterminous with those of the community of Rhos-on-Sea (Welsh: Llandrillo-yn-Rhos), on the North Wales coast, with the Mochdre and Rhiw wards to the south, Penrhyn ward to the west and Liverpool Bay to the northeast.

According to the 2011 UK Census the population of the ward was 7,593.

== County elections ==
The ward elects four county councillors to Conwy County Borough Council and, at the May 2017 election, all four seats were won by the Welsh Conservative Party. Newly elected councillor, James Lusted, was a well-known local actor and television presenter who has dwarfism. He pledged to campaign for people with disabilities. At 43 inches tall he became the Conservative Party's shortest elected politician.

2017 Conwy County Borough Council election
Party	Candidate	Votes	%	±%
Conservative	Roger Parry *	1,374	18.1	
Conservative	James Daniel Lusted	1,265	16.6	
Conservative	David Maelgwyn Roberts *	1,257	16.5	
Conservative	Donald Milne *	1,074	14.1	
Independent	Hannah Fleet	889	11.7	
Labour	Chris Brockley	775	10.2	
Independent	Gemma Leigh Campbell	667	8.8	
UKIP	David Philip Griffiths	299	3.9	
Turnout		7600	42.7	
Conservative hold		Swing		
Conservative hold		Swing		
Conservative hold		Swing		
Conservative hold		Swing		

* = sitting councillor prior to the election

== Town council ward ==
Rhos-on-sea elects town councillors to the Bay of Colwyn Town Council, but the community ward is called Rhos.
