= Tudno (electoral ward) =

Electoral ward in Conwy, Wales

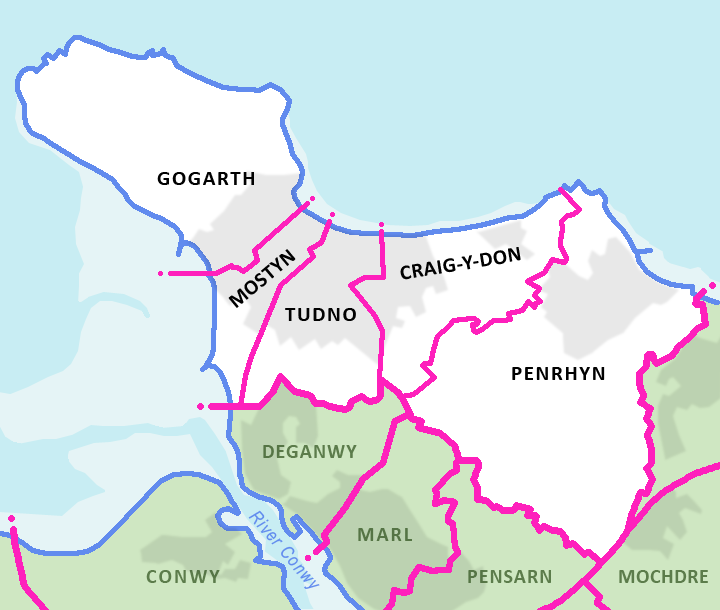
Map of electoral wards in and surrounding Llandudno

Tudno is one of the electoral wards in Llandudno, Conwy County Borough, Wales. It is the middle of the five town wards and covers the town immediately east of the branch line to Llandudno railway station. Mostyn ward lies to the west and Craig-y-Don ward lies to the east, with Llandudno beach to the north.

According to the 2011 UK Census the population of the ward was 5,008.

== Town Council elections ==
Tudno ward elects four of the twenty councillors of Llandudno Town Council.

In December 2017 a by-election was held for a vacant seat on the Town Council, following the death of Tudno councillor Billie Evans. The seat was won by Conservative Party candidate Brian Bertola, who had previously lost his seat at the May 2017 election.

== County council elections ==
Tudno was an electoral ward to Gwynedd County Council, in the Borough of Aberconwy, between 1989 and 1996.

Since 1995 the Tudno ward has elected two county councillors to Conwy County Borough Council and, at the May 2017 election, one seat was won by Ronnie Hughes for the Welsh Labour Party and the other by Independent candidate Philip Evans. Cllr Hughes was deputy leader of the county council and narrowly survived a strong challenge from Llandudno mayor, Carol Marubbi.
