= 2022 Conwy County Borough Council election =

2022 Welsh local election

2022 Conwy Council election
- 5 May 2022

All 55 seats to Conwy County Borough Council 28 seats needed for a majority

	First party	Second party	Third party
Party	Independent	Labour	Conservative
Seats won	22	11	10
Seat change	▲4	▲4	▼6
Popular vote	23,093	11,419	21,726
Percentage	33.5%	16.5%	31.5%
Swing	▲1.5pp	▲4.5pp	▼5.5pp
	Fourth party	Fifth party	Sixth party
Party	Plaid Cymru	Liberal Democrats	Green
Seats won	7	4	1
Seat change	▼3	Steady	▲1
Popular vote	6,626	4,176	1,974
Percentage	9.6%	6.1%	2.9%
Swing	▲1.6pp	▼2.9pp	▲1.8pp
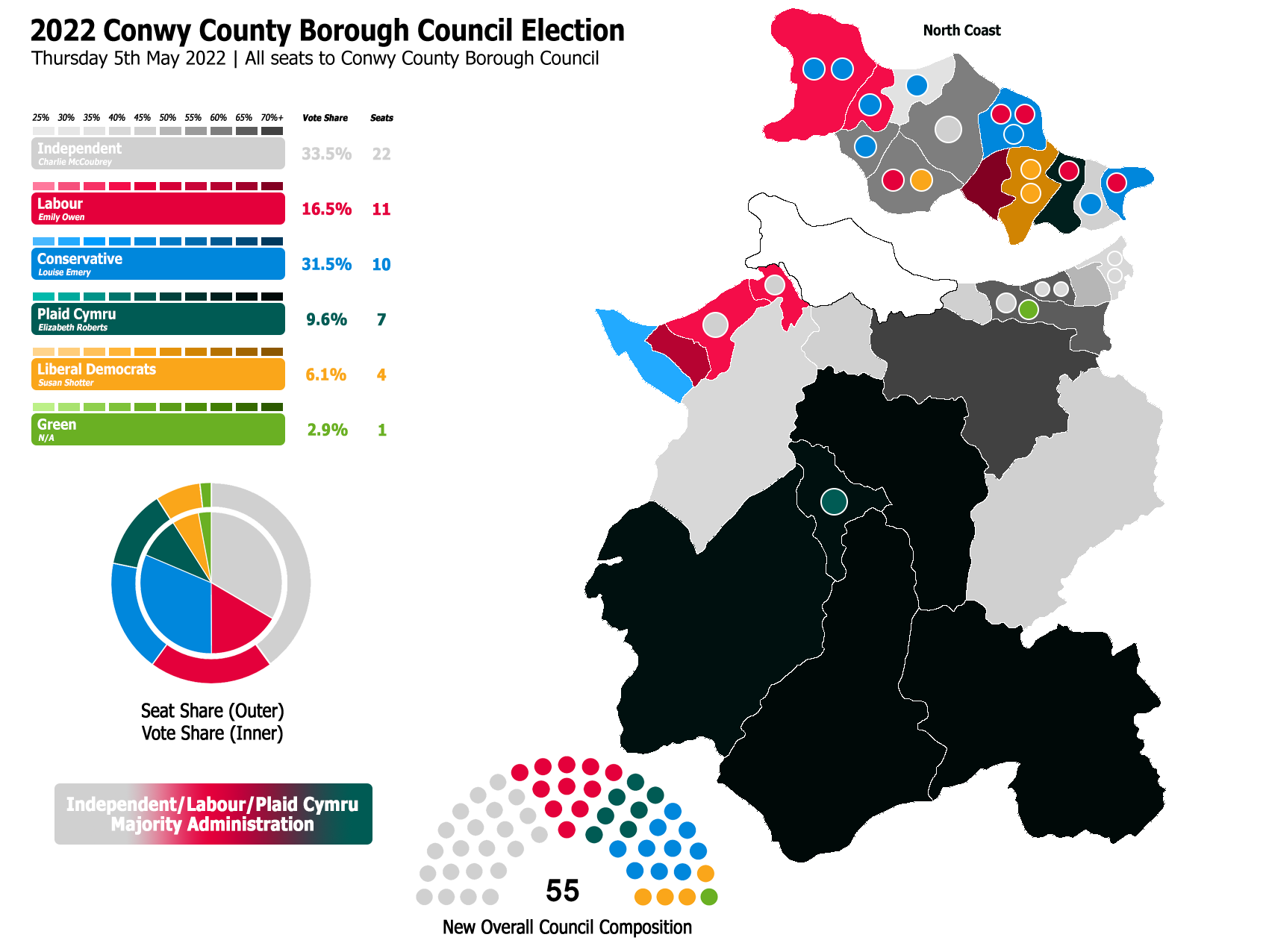
- Results of the 2022 election by ward

The 2022 Conwy County Borough Council election took place on Thursday 5 May 2022 to elect all 55 members of Conwy County Borough Council. It was held on the same day as all other councils in Wales, as part of the 2022 Welsh local elections.

All 55 seats across 30 wards were contested, an increase from the 2017 Conwy County Borough Council election, which saw 6 wards return councillors unopposed.

== Ward review ==
The election saw the number of councillors elected to Conwy County Borough Council reduced - from 59 to 55 - and the number of wards reduced from 38 to 30, as part of boundary changes to the county borough carried out by the Local Democracy and Boundary Commission for Wales. 18 wards remained unaffected - namely Betws yn Rhos, Bryn, Colwyn, Conwy, Craig-y-Don, Deganwy, Eirias, Glyn, Kinmel Bay, Llansanffraid, Llansannan, Llysfaen, Mochdre, Pandy, Penrhyn, Towyn, Tudno and Uwch Conwy.

== Election summary ==
Conwy County Borough Council election result 2022
Party	Candidates						Votes		
Party	Stood	Elected	Gained	Unseated	Net	% of total	%	No.	Net %
Independent	42	22			▲4	40.0	33.5	23,093	+1.5
Conservative	55	10			▼6	18.2	31.5	21,726	-5.5
Labour	22	11			▲4	20.0	16.5	11,419	+4.5
Plaid Cymru	14	7			▼3	12.7	9.6	6,626	+1.6
Liberal Democrats	12	4			Steady	7.3	6.1	4,176	-2.9
Green	6	1			▲1	1.8	2.9	1,974	New

== Ward results ==
* = denotes sitting councillor in the same ward prior to the elections
^{o} = existing councillor prior to the election, for a different or predecessor ward

The percentage shown for each candidate in multi-member wards is a percentage of the vote against the turnout of the election, as due to the nature of multi member wards, electors each have a number of votes equal to the number of seats available, however each elector does not have to use all their available votes.

=== Betws-y-Coed and Trefriw ===
Betws-y-Coed and Trefriw (1)
Party	Candidate	Votes	%	±%
Plaid Cymru	Liz Roberts ^{o}	495	67.8	N/A
Labour Co-op	Mike Bird	133	18.2	N/A
Conservative	Ann Williamson	102	14.0	N/A
Majority		362	49.6	N/A
Turnout		732	45.4	N/A
Plaid Cymru win (new seat)				

=== Betws-yn-Rhos ===
Betws-yn-Rhos (1)
Party	Candidate	Votes	%	±%
Independent	Ifor Glyn Lloyd *	600	86.2	N/A
Conservative	Thomas Rye	96	13.8	N/A
Majority		504	72.4	N/A
Turnout		701	43.1	
Independent hold		Swing		

=== Bryn ===
Bryn (1)
Party	Candidate	Votes	%	±%
Conservative	Jacob Williams	230	33.8	
Labour	Andrew Hinchcliff *	223	32.7	
Independent	Laura Fielding	115	16.9	
Plaid Cymru	Elgan Owen	63	9.3	
Liberal Democrats	Leena Farhat	50	7.3	
Majority		7	1.1	
Turnout		687	51.3	
Conservative gain from Labour		Swing		

=== Caerhun ===
Caerhun (1)
Party	Candidate	Votes	%	±%
Independent	Goronwy Edwards ^{o}	458	41.1	N/A
Conservative	Craig Jones	419	37.6	N/A
Labour	Meredic Hallett	237	21.3	N/A
Majority		39	3.5	N/A
Turnout		1,117	56.4	N/A
Independent win (new seat)				

=== Colwyn ===
Colwyn (2)
Party	Candidate	Votes	%	±%
Conservative	Cheryl Carlisle *	575	46.1	N/A
Labour	David Carr	448	35.9	N/A
Conservative	Sandra McAllister	393	31.5	N/A
Independent	Andy Jones	261	20.9	N/A
Plaid Cymru	Sibani Roy	240	19.2	N/A
Liberal Democrats	Jason Higgins	193	15.5	N/A
Independent	Cheryl Kersey-Brown	175	14.0	N/A
Turnout		1,254	36.7	
Conservative hold		Swing		
Labour gain from Liberal Democrats		Swing		

=== Conwy ===
Conwy (2)
Party	Candidate	Votes	%	±%
Labour	Emily Owen	573	41.1	
Independent	Sian Grady	505	36.2	
Conservative	Martin Craven	470	33.7	
Independent	Emma Leighton-Jones *	434	31.3	
Green	Petra Haig	246	17.6	
Conservative	Michael Hadwen	207	14.8	
Turnout		1,397	41.3	
Labour gain from Independent		Swing		
Independent gain from Independent		Swing		

=== Craig-y-don ===
Craig-y-don (2)
Party	Candidate	Votes	%	±%
Independent	Frank Bradfield *	442	37.4	
Conservative	Antony Bertola	425	36.0	
Conservative	Christina Rees-Jones	357	30.2	
Labour Co-op	Peter McGlory	351	29.7	29.7
Independent	Donald Milne	219	18.5	
Plaid Cymru	Ray Khan	166	14.1	
Liberal Democrats	Rachael Roberts	141	11.9	N/A
Turnout		1,186	43.4	
Independent gain from Conservative		Swing		
Conservative gain from Plaid Cymru		Swing		

Bradfield had been elected as a Conservative at the 2017 election.

=== Deganwy ===
Deganwy (2)
Party	Candidate	Votes	%	±%
Independent	Julie Fallon *	922	61.8	N/A
Conservative	Samantha Cotton *	662	44.4	N/A
Conservative	John Rooney	566	37.9	N/A
Green	Elaine Moore	411	27.5	N/A
Turnout		1,498	45.7	
Independent hold		Swing		
Conservative hold		Swing		

=== Eglwysbach a Llangernyw ===
Eglwysbach a Llangernyw (1)
Party	Candidate	Votes	%	±%
Plaid Cymru	Austin Roberts ^{o}	535	72.7	N/A
Conservative	Sybille Dreesbeimdieke	104	14.1	N/A
Labour Co-op	Donna Hutton	97	13.2	N/A
Majority		431	58.6	N/A
Turnout		743	46.6	N/A
Plaid Cymru win (new seat)				

=== Eirias ===
Eirias (2)
Party	Candidate	Votes	%	±%
Independent	Gail Jones *	524	48.2	N/A
Conservative	Neil Coverley	372	34.2	N/A
Conservative	Brian Madden	332	30.5	N/A
Green	Adam Turner	246	22.6	N/A
Independent	Sarah Ryder	237	21.8	N/A
Green	Jo-Anna Duncalf	194	17.8	N/A
Independent	Peter Calcraft	121	11.1	N/A
Turnout		1,087	38.6	
Independent hold		Swing		
Conservative gain from Independent		Swing		

Jones had won her seat at a by-election in March 2021.

=== Gele and Llanddulas ===
Gele and Llanddulas (3)
Party	Candidate	Votes	%	±%
Independent	Andrew Wood ^{o}	1,624	69.3	N/A
Independent	Keith Eeles ^{o}	1,499	64.0	N/A
Green	Ros Griffiths-Williams	720	30.7	N/A
Conservative	John Jones	651	27.8	N/A
Conservative	Pauline Heap-Williams ^{o}	616	26.3	N/A
Conservative	Gareth Smith	471	20.1	N/A
Turnout		2,349	44.1	N/A
Independent win (new seat)				
Independent win (new seat)				
Green win (new seat)				

=== Glyn ===
Glyn (2)
Party	Candidate	Votes	%	±%
Plaid Cymru	Abdul Khan *	598	62.5	N/A
Labour	Chris Hughes *	516	53.9	N/A
Conservative	David Howcroft	167	17.5	N/A
Independent	Tom MacLean	144	15.0	N/A
Conservative	Peter Webster	97	10.1	N/A
Turnout		964	31.5	
Plaid Cymru hold		Swing		
Labour hold		Swing		

=== Glyn y Marl ===
Glyn y Marl (3)
Party	Candidate	Votes	%	±%
Independent	Mike Priestly^{o}	1,366	60.7	N/A
Labour	Dave Jones	770	34.2	N/A
Liberal Democrats	Sue Shotter ^{o}	724	32.0	N/A
Labour	Trevor McGuinness	479	21.3	N/A
Conservative	Helen Roberts	463	20.6	N/A
Conservative	Gareth Probert	453	20.1	N/A
Plaid Cymru	Clare Parry	445	19.8	N/A
Plaid Cymru	Keren Bond	366	16.3	N/A
Conservative	Evie Roberts	351	15.6	N/A
Liberal Democrats	Pat Hart	321	14.3	N/A
Green	Iain Moore	157	7.0	N/A
Turnout		2,256	38.1	N/A
Independent win (new seat)				
Labour win (new seat)				
Liberal Democrats win (new seat)				

Priestly and Shotter had previously been councillors for the Marl ward.

=== Gogarth Mostyn ===
Gogarth Mostyn (3)
Party	Candidate	Votes	%	±%
Labour	Mandy Hawkins	924	42.9	N/A
Conservative	Louise Emery ^{o}	870	40.4	N/A
Conservative	Harry Saville ^{o}	861	40.0	N/A
Labour	Dawn McGuinness	839	38.9	N/A
Independent	Dewi Miles	773	35.9	N/A
Conservative	Greg Robbins ^{o}	754	35.0	N/A
Independent	Ian Turner	557	25.8	N/A
Turnout		2,167	38.6	N/A
Labour win (new seat)				
Conservative win (new seat)				
Conservative win (new seat)				

Emery and Saville had previously been councillors for Gogarth, while Robbins had previously been councillor for the Mostyn ward.

=== Kinmel Bay ===
Kinmel Bay (3)
Party	Candidate	Votes	%	±%
Independent	Nigel Smith *	598	42.6	
Independent	Kay Redhead	507	36.1	
Independent	Michael Smith *	467	33.3	
Independent	Stuart Anderson	457	32.5	
Conservative	Geoffrey Corry *	361	25.7	
Independent	Barry Griffiths	331	23.6	
Conservative	Luke Knightley	318	22.6	
Conservative	Toby Millar	273	19.4	
Independent	Morris Jones	263	18.7	
Turnout		1,409	30.7	
Independent hold		Swing		
Independent gain from Conservative		Swing		
Independent hold		Swing		

=== Llandrillo-yn-Rhos ===
Llandrillo-yn-Rhos (4)
Party	Candidate	Votes	%	±%
Conservative	Jo Nuttall	1,366	47.7	N/A
Labour	Hannah Fleet	1,282	44.8	N/A
Labour	Chris Brockley	1,224	42.8	N/A
Conservative	Gareth Jones	1,185	41.4	N/A
Conservative	Phillip Ashe	1,048	36.6	N/A
Conservative	Gregory Wynne	993	34.7	N/A
Labour	Joe Willgoose	938	32.8	N/A
Liberal Democrats	Lisa Wilkins	640	22.4	N/A
Independent	Mario D'Angelo	631	22.0	N/A
Turnout		2,876	42.9	N/A
Conservative win (new seat)				
Labour win (new seat)				
Labour win (new seat)				
Conservative win (new seat)				

=== Llanrwst a Llanddoged ===
Llanrwst a Llanddoged (2)
Party	Candidate	Votes	%	±%
Plaid Cymru	Aaron Wynne ^{o}	939	66.7	N/A
Plaid Cymru	Nia Owen	829	58.9	N/A
Conservative	Mostyn Jones	619	44.0	N/A
Conservative	Gwyn Lewis	210	14.9	N/A
Turnout		1,413	48.6	N/A
Plaid Cymru win (new seat)				
Plaid Cymru win (new seat)				

=== Llansanffraid ===
Llansanffraid (1)
Party	Candidate	Votes	%	±%
Independent	Sharon Doleman	394	47.0	
Independent	Sylvia Hughes	172	20.5	
Conservative	Nigel Williams	164	19.6	
Liberal Democrats	Sarah Lesiter-Burgess	108	12.9	
Majority		222	26.5	
Turnout		847	47.5	
Independent gain from Independent		Swing		

=== Llansannan ===
Llansannan (1)
Party	Candidate	Votes	%	±%
Independent	Trystan Lewis ^{o}	358	46.1	
Plaid Cymru	Sue Lloyd-Williams *	321	41.3	
Conservative	Loren Lloyd-Pepperell	98	12.6	
Majority		37	4.8	
Turnout		778	53.0	
Independent gain from Plaid Cymru		Swing		

Lewis had previously been a Plaid Cymru councillor for Pensarn, but had been suspended by the party after he decided to stand against fellow Plaid Cymru member, Lloyd-Williams, who had moved to Denbighshire.

=== Llysfaen ===
Llysfaen (1)
Party	Candidate	Votes	%	±%
Independent	Geoff Stewart	283	46.6	
Labour	Dylan Davies	179	29.5	
Conservative	Philip Capper *	145	23.9	
Majority		104	17.1	
Turnout		608	32.8	
Independent gain from Conservative		Swing		

=== Mochdre ===
Mochdre (1)
Party	Candidate	Votes	%	±%
Labour	Stephen Price	283	70.8	N/A
Conservative	Berin Jones	117	29.2	N/A
Majority		166	41.6	N/A
Turnout		404	28.1	N/A
Labour hold		Swing		

=== Pandy ===
Pandy (1)
Party	Candidate	Votes	%	±%
Labour	Penny Andow *	410	60.6	N/A
Conservative	Peter Osborn	165	24.4	N/A
Liberal Democrats	Preben Vangberg	102	15.0	N/A
Majority		245	36.2	N/A
Turnout		682	49.0	N/A
Labour hold		Swing		

Andow won the previous 2017 election unopposed.

=== Pen-sarn Pentre Mawr ===
Pen-sarn Pentre Mawr (3)
Party	Candidate	Votes	%	±%
Independent	Alan Hunter ^{o}	1,113	65.6	N/A
Independent	Charlie McCoubrey ^{o}	1,078	63.6	N/A
Independent	Paul Edwin Luckock	934	55.1	N/A
Conservative	Tracey Brennen	410	24.2	N/A
Conservative	Mark Baker ^{o}	373	22.0	N/A
Conservative	Natasha Rowlands	315	18.6	N/A
Turnout		1,705	34.7	N/A
Independent win (new seat)				
Independent win (new seat)				
Independent win (new seat)				

Hunter had previously been councillor for the Abergele-Pensarn ward, while McCoubrey was a councillor for Pentre Mawr.

=== Penmaenmawr ===
Penmaenmawr (2)
Party	Candidate	Votes	%	±%
Labour	Cathy Augustine	589	43.1	N/A
Independent	Anne McCaffrey ^{o}	504	36.9	N/A
Plaid Cymru	Lisa Goodier	455	33.3	N/A
Independent	John Sharples	404	29.6	N/A
Conservative	Jack Ellis	261	19.1	N/A
Conservative	Sarah Jones	137	10.0	N/A
Independent	Christopher Williams	52	3.8	N/A
Turnout		1,370	40.2	N/A
Labour win (new seat)				
Independent win (new seat)				

McCaffrey had previously been councillor for the Capelulo ward.

=== Penrhyn ===
Penrhyn (2)
Party	Candidate	Votes	%	±%
Independent	Carol Beard *	1,282	64.2	
Independent	Chris Cater *	1,086	54.4	
Conservative	Tom Prytherch	663	33.2	
Conservative	Jeff Pearson	375	18.8	
Labour	Gwynne Reddick	271	13.7	
Turnout		1,998	51.5	
Independent hold		Swing		
Independent hold		Swing		

=== Rhiw ===
Rhiw (3)
Party	Candidate	Votes	%	±%
Liberal Democrats	Trevor Stott ^{o}	909	55.8	N/A
Liberal Democrats	John Roberts ^{o}	854	52.4	N/A
Liberal Democrats	Simon Croft	628	38.6	N/A
Conservative	John Clayton	525	32.4	N/A
Conservative	Paul Hughes	516	31.7	N/A
Conservative	Ricki Owen	476	29.2	N/A
Independent	Debra Jones	338	20.7	N/A
Turnout		1,634	36.6	N/A
Liberal Democrats win (new seat)				
Liberal Democrats win (new seat)				
Liberal Democrats win (new seat)				

=== Tudno ===
Tudno (2)
Party	Candidate	Votes	%	±%
Labour	Angie O'Grady	536	42.1	
Conservative	Thomas Brian Montgomery	507	39.8	
Independent	Carol Marubbi	435	34.1	
Liberal Democrats	Rob Atenstaedt	275	21.6	
Conservative	Ryan Ehike-West	261	20.5	N/A
Independent	Robert Hughes-Mullock	141	11.1	N/A
Turnout		1,286	36.2	
Labour hold		Swing		
Conservative gain from Independent		Swing		

=== Tywyn/Towyn ===
Tywyn/Towyn (1)
Party	Candidate	Votes	%	±%
Independent	Bernice McLoughlin	289	51.9	
Conservative	David Johnson *	268	48.1	
Majority		21	3.8	
Turnout		581	32.3	
Independent gain from Independent		Swing		

Johnson had been elected in 2017 as an independent.

=== Uwch Aled ===
Uwch Aled (1)
Party	Candidate	Votes	%	±%
Plaid Cymru	Gwennol Ellis	658	89.2	N/A
Conservative	Robin Offley	80	10.8	N/A
Majority		578	78.4	N/A
Turnout		743	53.5	N/A
Plaid Cymru win (new seat)				

=== Uwch Conwy ===
Uwch Conwy (1)
Party	Candidate	Votes	%	±%
Plaid Cymru	Dilwyn Roberts	516	74.6	
Labour	Andy Walsh	114	16.5	
Conservative	Robin Offley	62	8.9	
Majority		402	58.1	
Turnout		743	55.9	
Plaid Cymru hold		Swing		

== Changes 2022-2026 ==
=== Affiliation changes ===
Glyn y Marl Labour councillor Dave Jones left the Labour Party in May 2025, subsequently representing the Citizens First Alliance. Tudno Conservative councillors Thomas Montgomery along with Gogarth Mostyn Councillor Louise Emery left the Conservative Party in July 2025, defecting to Reform UK.

=== Bryn (2026) ===
Bryn by-election: 19 November 2026
Party	Candidate	Votes	%	±%
Independent	Rhys Griffiths	189	37.3	N/A
Liberal Democrats	Leena Farhat	182	35.9	+28.6
Independent	Nia Furber	67	13.2	N/A
Reform	Robert Craven	43	8.5	N/A
Conservative	Rodney Davies	15	3.0	−30.8
Restore	Tony Priestley	11	2.2	N/A
Majority		7		
Turnout		507		
Independent gain from Conservative				
