= St Mary's Church, Betws-y-Coed =

Church in Conwy County Borough, Wales

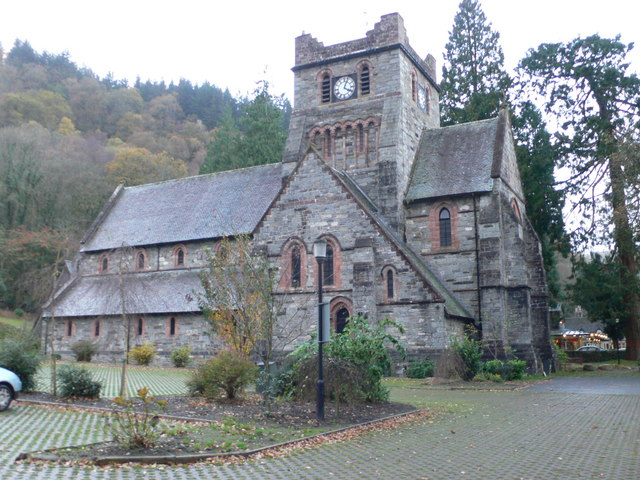
- St Mary's Church, Betws-y-Coed, from the southeast
- St Mary's Church, Betws-y-Coed
- 53.0916°N 3.8028°W
- Location: Betws-y-Coed, Conwy
- Country: Wales
- Denomination: Church in Wales
- Website: St Mary, Betws-y-Coed

History
- Status: Parish church

Architecture
- Functional status: Active
- Heritage designation: Grade II*
- Designated: 21 January 1988
- Architect: Paley and Austin
- Architectural type: Church
- Style: Transitional Norman
- Groundbreaking: 1870
- Completed: 1907
- Construction cost: £5,000 (£470,000 in 2025)

Specifications
- Materials: Rubble stone with sandstone dressings slate roofs

Administration
- Diocese: Bangor
- Archdeaconry: Bangor
- Deanery: Arllechwedd

St Mary's Church, Betws-y-Coed, is in the village of Betws-y-Coed, Conwy, Wales. It is an active Anglican parish church of the Church in Wales, in the deanery of Arllechwedd, the archdeaconry of Bangor and the diocese of Bangor. The church is designated by Cadw as a Grade II* listed building.

== History ==
The church was built between 1870 and 1873 to replace the earlier 14th-century St Michael's Old Church, from which the village took the name 'Betws', and to accommodate the increasing number of summer visitors to the village. It was designed by the Lancaster partnership of Paley and Austin, the commission being gained as a result of a competition won by Hubert Austin. The principal benefactor was the Liverpool businessman Charles Kurtz. The church was consecrated in July 1873, and provided seating for 150 people. It replaced a medieval church dedicated to Saint Michael, and cost £5,000 (equivalent to £470,000 in 2025).

The tower was completed in 1907, but has never held any bells other than an 11-cwt Warner clock bell. In 2025, the ring of eight bells from Porthmadog church was acquired for St. Mary's, and arrived there in February 2026 ready for installation, having been cleaned and retuned at a bell foundry in Loughborough. Following installation, the bells were fully rung for the first time on Easter Sunday 2026.

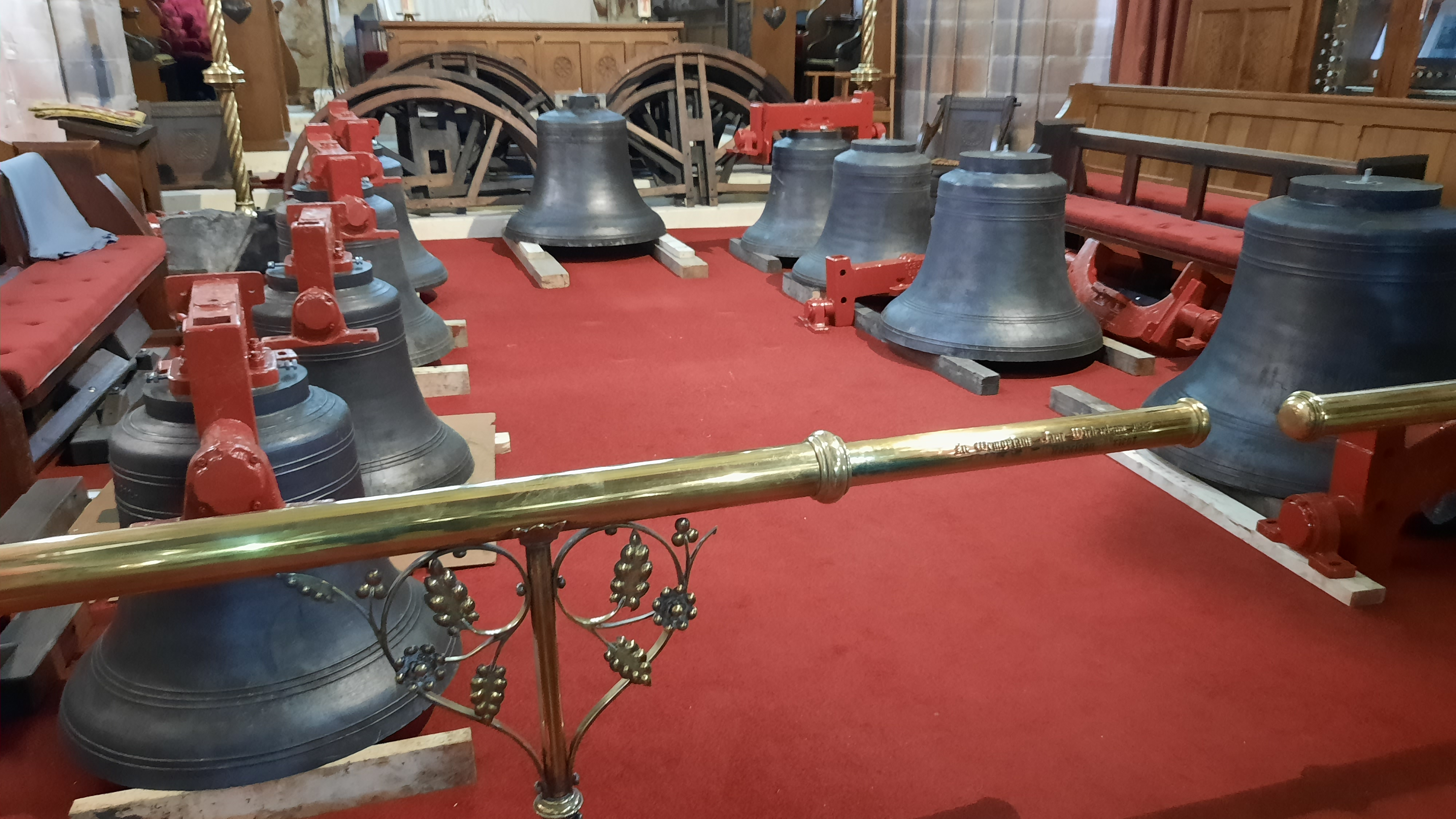
The 'new' bells at St Mary's, Betws-y-coed, prior to being installed

== Architecture ==
=== Exterior ===
St Mary's is constructed in rubble stone with sandstone dressings, and it has slated roofs. Its architectural style is Transitional Norman. The plan is cruciform with a tower at the crossing and an organ chamber to its south. To the west of the crossing is a four-bay nave with a clerestory, north and south aisles, and a north porch. To the east of the crossing is a chancel. On the north side of the tower is a four-stage stair turret with a conical roof. The middle stage of the tower has lancet windows, and in the top stage are louvred lancets flanking clock faces. On the south side is blind arcading. The parapet is stepped at the corners. Along the sides of aisles, clerestories and chancel are more lancet windows. At the east end is a five-light window with plate tracery, and at the west end is a rose window, also with plate tracery.

=== Interior ===
Inside the church are arcades with pointed arches. The font is constructed in black and burgundy marble, and the pulpit is in sandstone; both are in Early English style. In the south wall of the chancel is a recess, and in the north wall is an aumbry. The chancel is floored with tiles. The choir stalls and reading desks are in Arts and Crafts style. The reredos, inserted in 1929, is in Italian alabaster, and depicts the Passion of Christ. Most of the stained glass was made by Shrigley and Hunt of Lancaster. Other windows were made by Jones and Willis, based on designs by Edward Burne-Jones. The two-manual organ was built in 1870 by Gray and Davison. It was enlarged in about 1913 and again in about 1920 by the same firm. In 1969 the organ was rebuilt by Wood Wordsworth and Company.

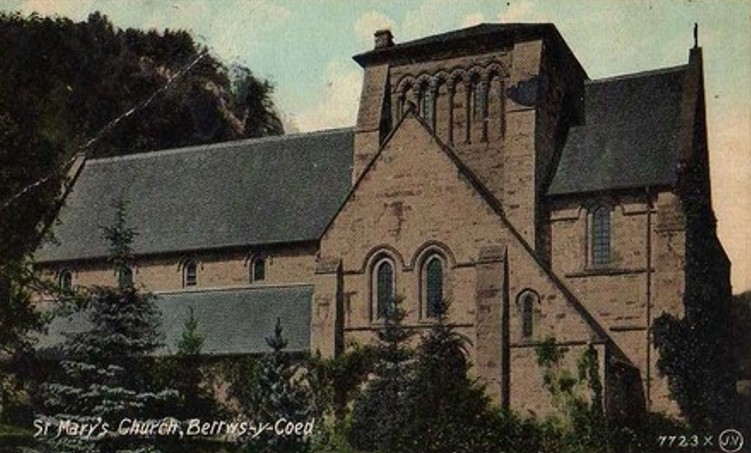
St Mary's church in the early 20th century, before the tower was completed

== See also ==
- List of ecclesiastical works by Paley and Austin
