= Bro Garmon =

Community in Conwy County Borough, Wales

Coordinates: 53.084°N 3.771°W

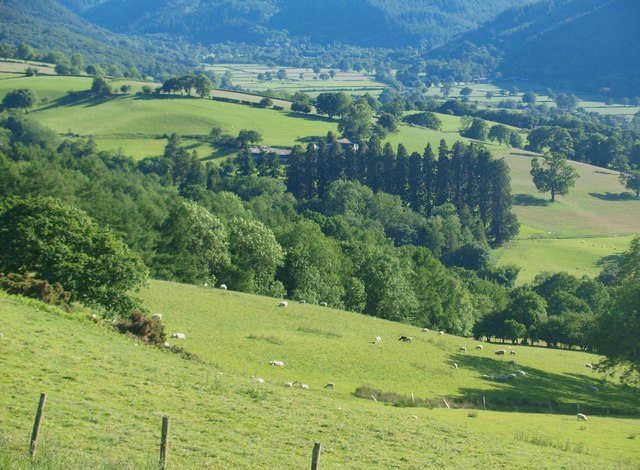
- The Conwy Valley seen from Melin-y-coed
- Area: 54.67 km^{2} (21.11 sq mi)
- Population: 652 (2011)
  - Density: 12/km^{2} (31/sq mi)
- OS grid reference: SH8155
- Community: Bro Garmon
- Principal area: Conwy
- Preserved county: Clwyd
- Country: Wales
- Sovereign state: United Kingdom
- Post town: BETWS-Y-COED
- Postcode district: LL24
- Post town: LLANRWST
- Postcode district: LL26
- Dialling code: 01690
- Police: North Wales
- Fire: North Wales
- Ambulance: Welsh
- UK Parliament: Bangor Aberconwy
- Senedd Cymru – Welsh Parliament: Aberconwy
- List of places UK Wales Conwy Map of the community

Bro Garmon is a community in Conwy County Borough, in Wales. It is located on the eastern side of the Conwy Valley, stretching from north east of Llanrwst to just west of Pentrefoelas, and includes the villages of Capel Garmon, Glan Conwy, Melin-y-Coed, Nebo, Oaklands, Rhydlanfair and Pentre-tafarn-y-fedw. Moel Seisiog, on the eastern boundary, rises to a height of 1,535 feet (468 m). The main settlement, Capel Garmon, lies 2.4 miles (3.9 km) east of Betws-y-Coed, 5.2 miles (8.4 km) north west of Pentrefoelas, 4.4 miles (7.1 km) south of Llanrwst and 15.7 miles (25.3 km) south of Conwy. At the 2001 census the community had a population of 648, increasing slightly at the 2011 census to 652.

Saint Garmon's church, in Capel Garmon, was consecrated in 1862, but is no longer in use. An Iron Age firedog, discovered buried in a nearby field in 1852, and now held at the National Museum of Wales, is considered to have been produced by a master craftsman. It depicts two mythical creatures, part horse and part bull, and is rated as one of the most important examples of decorative ironwork found in the United Kingdom. To the south of the village, a Neolithic chamber tomb has been dated to 5,500 years ago. Nearby, Melin Plas-yn-Rhos is a water-powered corn mill thought to date from the 18th century.

Waterloo Bridge, which carries the A5 across the River Conwy to Betws-y-Coed, was built by Thomas Telford in 1815, the year of the Battle of Waterloo, and is made wholly from cast iron. It is Grade I listed, and Cyffdy Hall, at Melin-y-coed, and Cilcennus at Oaklands are Grade II* listed. Hendre House is a Grade II listed building. Its gardens and grounds are listed, also at Grade II on the Cadw/ICOMOS Register of Parks and Gardens of Special Historic Interest in Wales. Numerous other houses, farm buildings and several bridges in the community are also Grade II listed.

The community is part of the Uwch Conwy ward for elections to Conwy County Borough Council.
