= Mostyn (Llandudno electoral ward) =

Electoral ward in Conwy, Wales

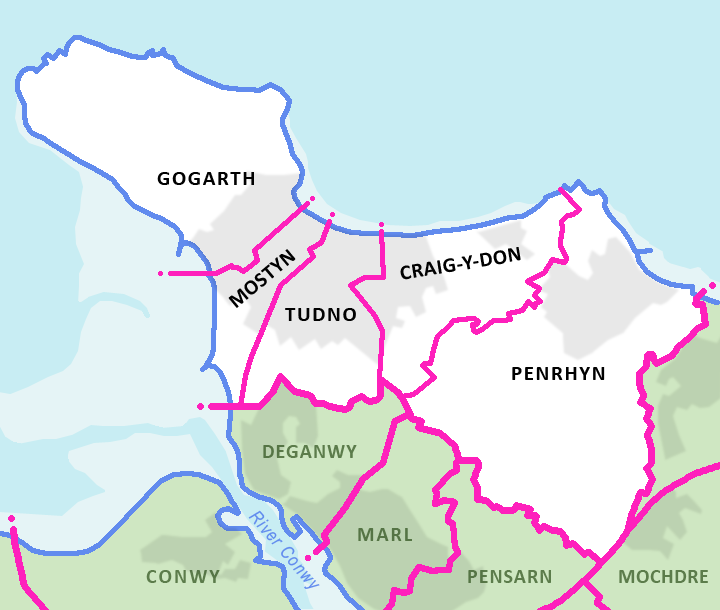
Map of electoral wards in and surrounding Llandudno

Mostyn is one of the electoral wards in Llandudno, Conwy County Borough, Wales. It is one of five town wards and covers Llandudno town immediately west of the railway line (which terminates at Llandudno railway station). Gogarth ward (covering the Great Orme) lies to the northwest and Tudno ward lies to the east, with Llandudno beach to the north and Conwy Sands to the southwest.

According to the 2011 UK Census the population of the ward was 3,639.

== County council elections ==
The ward elects two county councillors to Conwy County Borough Council and, at the May 2017 election, one seat was won by Pat Hebron for the Welsh Labour Party and the other by Welsh Conservative candidate Greg Robbins.

Following the resignation of a Mostyn councillor, a by-election had been held on 7 July 2016 which was won by 21 year old Labour candidate, Emily Owen, a student at Bangor University. She became the youngest councillor on the county council, but didn't stand for re-election in the seat in May 2017.

== Town Council elections ==
Mostyn ward also elects four of the twenty councillors of Llandudno Town Council.
