= Conwy County Borough Council =

Local government authority in central north Wales

Conwy County Borough Council Cyngor Bwrdeistref Sirol Conwy (Welsh)

Type
- Type: Principal council of Conwy County Borough

History
- Founded: 1 April 1996

Leadership
- Chair: Trystan Lewis, Independent since 23 October 2025
- Leader: Julie Fallon, Independent since 8 October 2025
- Chief Executive: Rhun ap Gareth since November 2022

Structure
- Seats: 55 councillors
- Graph of the party split among 55 seats.
- Political groups: Administration (33) Plaid Cymru (8) Labour (6) Green (1) Independent (18) Other parties (22) Conservative (7) Liberal Democrats (4) Reform (2) Independent (9)

Elections
- Voting system: First-past-the-post
- Last election: 5 May 2022
- Next election: 6 May 2027

Meeting place
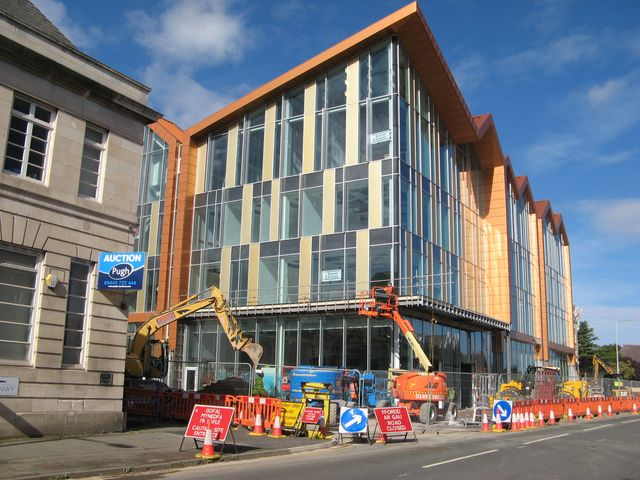
- Coed Pella, Conway Road, Colwyn Bay, LL29 7AZ

Website
- www.conwy.gov.uk

Conwy County Borough Council (Welsh: Cyngor Bwrdeistref Sirol Conwy) is the local authority for the county borough of Conwy, one of the principal areas of Wales.

== History ==
Conwy County Borough was created in 1996 under the Local Government (Wales) Act 1994, which replaced the previous two tier system of counties and districts with principal areas (each designated either a "county" or a "county borough"), whose councils perform the functions previously divided between the county and district councils. The county borough of Conwy was created to cover the area of the district of Aberconwy from the county of Gwynedd and the district of Colwyn from the county of Clwyd, except for the parishes of Cefnmeiriadog and Trefnant, which went to Denbighshire. The government originally named the new area "Aberconwy and Colwyn" (Welsh: Aberconwy a Cholwyn). During the transition to the new system, the shadow authority requested a change of name from "Aberconwy and Colwyn" to "Conwy", taking the name from both the River Conwy which runs through the area and the town of Conwy, where the new council initially established its headquarters. The government confirmed the change with effect from 2 April 1996, one day after the new council came into being.

== Political control ==
The first election to the new council was held in 1995, initially operating as a shadow authority before coming into its powers on 1 April 1996. Political control of the council since 1996 has been as follows:

Party in control	Years
No overall control	1996–present

=== Leadership ===
The leaders of the council since 2005 have been:

Councillor	Party	From	To
Goronwy Edwards	Independent	2005	May 2008
Dilwyn Roberts	Plaid Cymru	15 May 2008	May 2017
Gareth Jones	Plaid Cymru	18 May 2017	Jun 2017
Gareth Jones	Independent	Jun 2017	3 Jun 2019
Sam Rowlands	Conservative	3 Jun 2019	13 May 2021
Charlie McCoubrey	Independent	13 May 2021	8 Oct 2025
Julie Fallon	Independent	8 Oct 2025	

=== Composition ===
Following the 2022 election, by-elections, and subsequent changes of allegiance up to November 2026, the composition of the council was:

Party	Seats
Conservative	7
Plaid Cymru	8
Labour	6
Liberal Democrats	4
Reform	2
Green	1
Independent	27
Total	55

Of the independent councillors, 18 sit together as the "Conwy First Independent Group", two sit as the "Allied Independents", two form the "Citizens First Alliance", and two are not aligned to any group. The Green councillor sits with Plaid Cymru as the "Plaid Cymru a'r Blaid Werdd" (English: Plaid Cymru and the Green Party) group. Cabinet positions are held by members of the Conwy First Independent, Labour and Plaid Cymru a'r Blaid Werdd groups. The leader of the council, Julie Fallon, belongs to the Conway First Independent Group. The next election is due in 2027.

== Elections ==
Since 2012, elections have been held every five years.

Year	Seats	Independent	Labour	Conservative	Plaid Cymru	Liberal Democrats	Green	Notes
1995	59	13	**18**	8	2	**18**	0	
1999	59	**19**	14	5	7	14	0	New ward boundaries.
2004	59	**19**	12	12	10	6	0	
2008	59	14	7	**22**	12	4	0	
2012	59	**19**	10	13	12	5	0	
2017	59	**21**	8	16	10	4	0	
2022	55	**22**	11	10	7	4	1	New ward boundaries.

Party with the most elected councillors in bold. Coalition agreements in notes column.

== Premises ==
The council is based at Coed Pella on Conway Road in Colwyn Bay, which was purpose-built for the council and was completed in 2018.

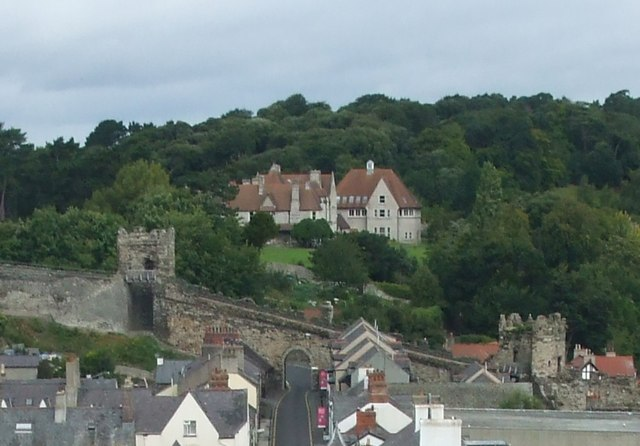
Bodlondeb, Bangor Road, Conwy: Council's headquarters 1996–2025

From the council's creation in 1996 until 2025, the council's headquarters was Bodlondeb, which was built as a house in 1877 on Bangor Road in Conwy, just outside the town walls and set in substantial grounds stretching down to the River Conwy. The house had been bought in 1937 by the former Conwy Municipal Borough Council and converted into a civic centre. The building passed to Aberconwy District Council under the 1974 reforms and then to Conwy County Borough Council on its creation in 1996. The new Coed Pella building in Colwyn Bay initially served as an additional office space, with Bodlondeb remaining the council's official headquarters and main meeting place. In 2025 the council closed Bodlondeb, having consolidated its functions and main meeting place at Coed Pella.

== Electoral divisions ==
Electoral divisions in Conwy County Borough

Until 2022 the county borough was divided into 38 electoral wards returning 59 councillors. Few communities in Conwy are coterminous with electoral wards. The following table lists council wards, communities and associated geographical areas. Communities with a community council are indicated with a '*':

Ward	Councillors	Communities (and community wards)
Abergele Pensarn	1	Abergele (town)* (Pensarn ward)
Betws-y-Coed	1	Betws-y-Coed; Capel Curig*; Dolwyddelan*
Betws yn Rhos	1	Betws yn Rhos*; Llanfair Talhaiarn*
Bryn	1	Llanfairfechan (town)* (Bryn and Lafan wards)
Caerhun	1	Caerhun*; Henryd*
Capelulo	1	Penmaenmawr (town)* (Capelulo ward)
Colwyn	2	part of the community of Old Colwyn
Conwy	2	Conwy (town)* (Aberconwy and Castle wards)
Craig-y-Don	2	Llandudno (town)* (Craig-y-Don ward)
Crwst	1	Llanrwst (town)* (Crwst ward)
Deganwy	2	Conwy (town)* (Deganwy ward)
Eglwysbach	1	Eglwysbach*; Llanddoged and Maenan*
Eirias	2	Part of the Community of Old Colwyn
Gele	3	Abergele (town)* (Gele and St George wards)
Glyn	2	Part of the Community of Colwyn Bay
Gogarth	2	Llandudno (town)* (Gogarth ward)
Gower	1	Llanrwst (Gower ward)
Kinmel Bay	3	Kinmel Bay and Towyn* (Kinmel Bay ward)
Llanddulas	1	Llanddulas and Rhyd-y-Foel*
Llandrillo yn Rhos	4	Rhos-on-Sea
Llangernyw	1	Llangernyw*; Pentrefoelas*
Llansanffraid	1	Llansanffraid Glan Conwy*
Llansannan	1	Llansannan*; Llannefydd*
Llysfaen	1	Llysfaen*
Marl	2	Conwy (town)* (Marl ward)
Mochdre	1	Mochdre
Mostyn	2	Llandudno (town)* (Mostyn ward)
Pandy	1	Llanfairfechan* (Pandy ward)
Pant-yr-afon/Penmaenan	1	Penmaenmawr* (Pant-yr-afon and Penmaenan wards)
Penrhyn	2	Llandudno (town)* (Penrhyn ward)
Pensarn	1	Conwy (town)* (Pensarn ward)
Pentre Mawr	2	Abergele (town)* (Pentre Mawr ward)
Rhiw	3	Part of the Community of Colwyn Bay
Towyn	1	Kinmel Bay and Towyn* (Towyn ward)
Trefriw	1	Dolgarrog*; Trefriw*
Tudno	2	Llandudno (town)* (Tudno ward)
Uwch Conwy	1	Bro Machno*; Bro Garmon*; Ysbyty Ifan*
Uwchaled	1	Cerrigydrudion*; Llanfihangel Glyn Myfyr*; Llangwm*
