= Conwy (electoral ward) =

Electoral ward in Conwy, Wales

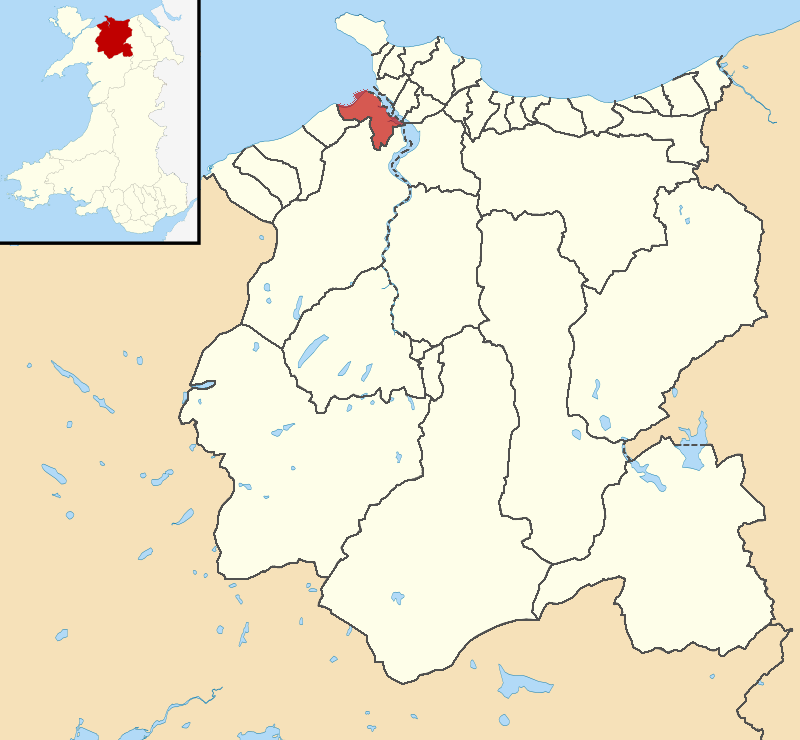
Location of Conwy ward within Conwy County Borough

Conwy is one of the electoral wards in the town and community of Conwy, Conwy County Borough, Wales. The ward covers the community to the west of the River Conwy and is one of four county wards included within the boundaries of the community. The wards of Deganwy, Marl and Pensarn lie east of the river.

According to the 2011 UK Census the population of the ward was 4,065.

== County council elections ==
The ward elects two county councillors to Conwy County Borough Council and, at the May 2017 election, both seats were won by Independent candidates. Cllr Joan Vaughan has represented the ward since 2004, while the other seat has previously been won by the Labour Party and Plaid Cymru.

2017 Conwy County Borough Council election
| Party | Candidate | Votes | % | ±% |
|---|---|---|---|---|
| Independent | Joan Mary Vaughan * | 611 | 33.0 | |
| Independent | Emma Leighton-Jones | 504 | 27.2 | |
| Labour | Emily Hannah Owen | 434 | 23.7 | |
| Liberal Democrats | Shari Barber | 305 | 16.5 | |
| Turnout | | 1854 | 38.6 | |
| Independent hold | | Swing | | |
| Independent gain from Labour | | Swing | | |

2012 Conwy County Borough Council election
| Party | Candidate | Votes | % | ±% |
|---|---|---|---|---|
| Labour | Sara Louise Allardice | 618 | 33.8 | |
| Independent | Joan Vaughan * | 471 | 25.8 | |
| Plaid Cymru | Peredur Morris | 233 | 12.8 | |
| Independent | Neil Bryson | 179 | 9.8 | |
| Conservative | Jennifer Evans | 179 | 9.8 | |
| Conservative | David Martin Williams | 146 | 8.0 | |
| Turnout | | 1826 | 34.4 | |
| Labour gain from Plaid Cymru | | Swing | | |
| Independent hold | | Swing | | |

* = sitting councillor prior to the election

== Town Council elections ==
For the purposes of elections to Conwy Town Council, Conwy ward is further divided into two community wards - Aberconwy and Castle - which elect a total of five town councillors.

== See also ==
- List of places in Conwy County Borough (categorised)
