= Melin-y-Coed =

Village in Conwy County Borough, Wales

Coordinates: 53.127°N 3.770°W

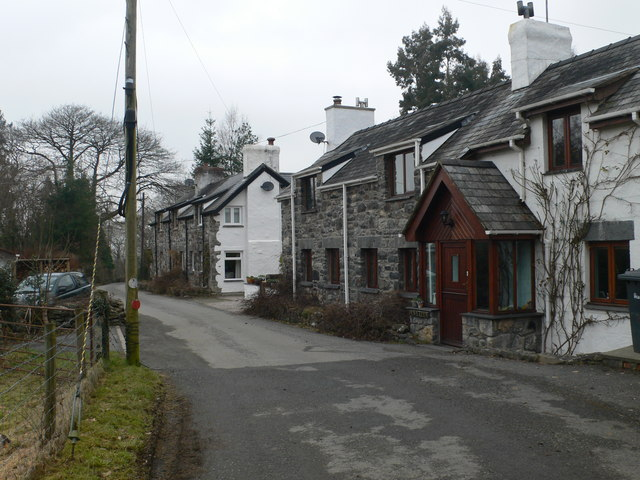
- The three remaining mill workers' cottages at Glanllyn Terrace, Melin-y-Coed.

- Location within Conwy
- OS grid reference: SH815603
- Community: Bro Garmon
- Principal area: Conwy
- Country: Wales
- Sovereign state: United Kingdom
- Post town: LLANRWST
- Postcode district: LL26
- Dialling code: 01492
- Police: North Wales
- Fire: North Wales
- Ambulance: Welsh
- UK Parliament: Bangor Aberconwy
- Senedd Cymru – Welsh Parliament: Aberconwy

Melin-y-Coed (standard Welsh: Melin-y-coed, lit. 'mill in the wood') is a small rural village in the county borough of Bro Garmon, Conwy, Wales. It stands about 2.5 km south-east of Llanrwst beside the little river Nant-y-Golon. Behind the village to the east the hills rise to Moel Seisiog (467m). The B5427 links Melin-y-Coed to Llanrwst. The earliest surviving building in the village is Cyffdy Hall, built in 1596.

== Description ==
The minor road that leaves the B5427 at Llanrwst crosses the Nant-y-Golon at Melin-y-Coed by two early-nineteenth-century stone bridges. The main Melin-y-Coed bridge with curving revetment walls is listed Grade II as "an early C19 vernacular bridge", and sixty metres downstream a second bridge dated 1822 is separately protected for its carved date-stone and group value. Adjoining the crossing is Bethel Calvinistic Methodist Chapel, founded in 1822 and rebuilt in 1879; Cadw notes its intact raked box pews and coved plaster ceiling and lists it Grade II as "an unspoilt nineteenth-century rural chapel".

About 1 km south-east stands Cyffdy Hall, a two-storey sub-medieval house externally and internally dated 1596'. Georgian remodelling added sash windows and a stable-coach-house range; Cadw designates the ensemble Grade II as "an unusually good example of a small multi-period country house" occupying a prominent hillside site overlooking the Afon Cyffdy.

Census 2021 returns counted 673 usual residents in Bro Garmon, giving a density of roughly 12 inhabitants per km² across the 54.7 km² community. Mixed deciduous woodland shelters the settlement, while to the east the ground rises to the trig-pointed summit of Moel Seisiog (467 m).

== Listed buildings ==
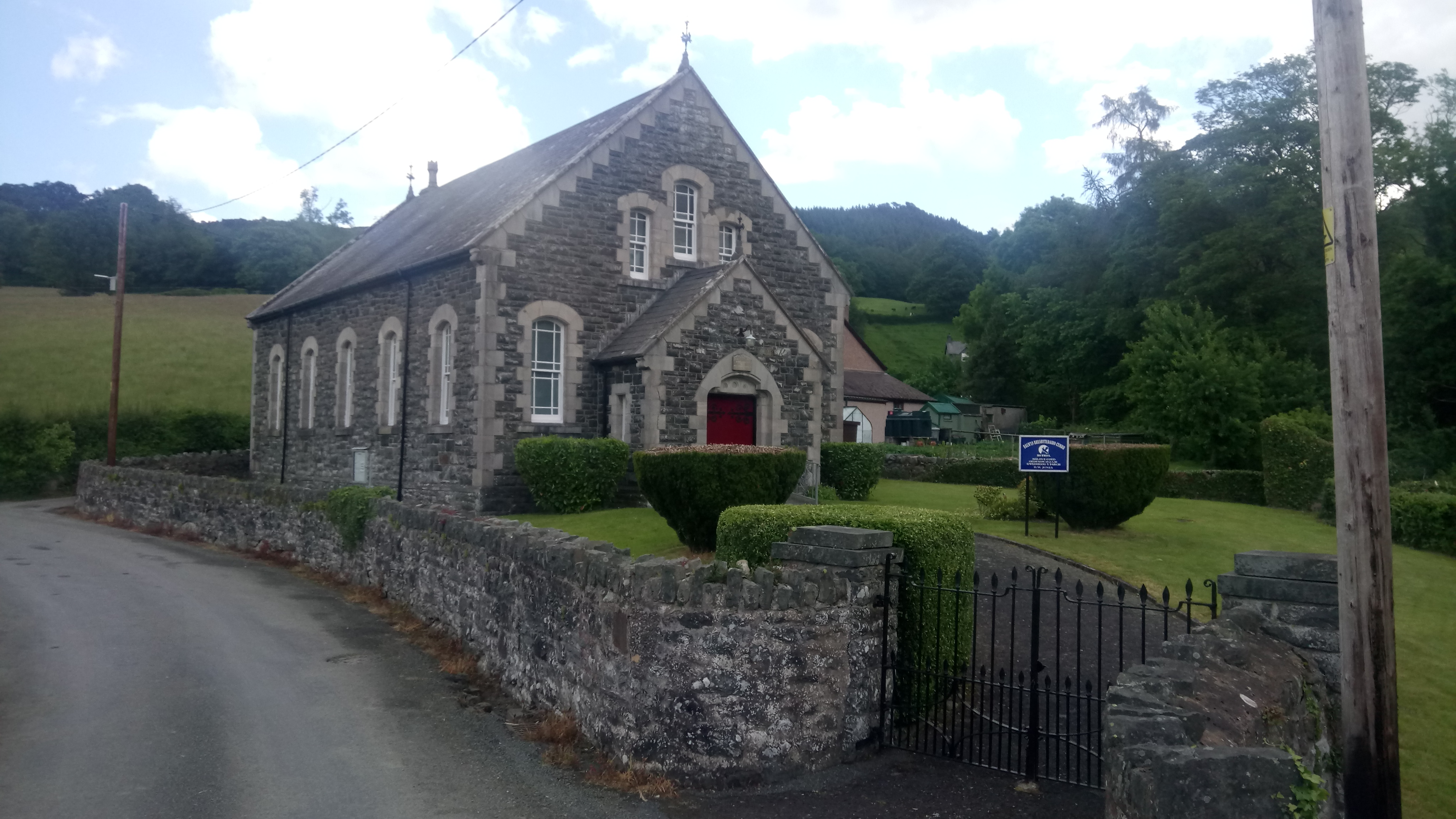
Chapel at Melin-y-Coed

The Bethel Chapel (built 1822, rebuilt 1879) and two bridges also dating from 1822 are Grade II listed. Cyffdy Hall together with its Coach House is Grade II* listed.
