= Betws-y-Coed and Trefriw =

Electoral ward of Conwy County Borough, Wales

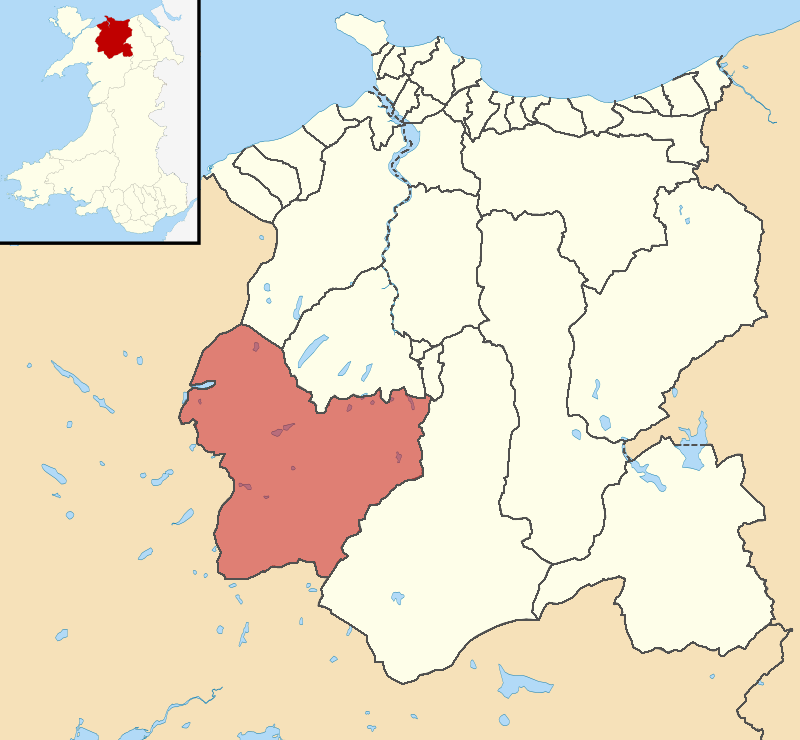
Location of the former Betws-y-Coed ward within Conwy County Borough

Betws-y-Coed and Trefriw (Welsh: Betws-y-Coed a Threfriw) is an electoral ward in the southwest of Conwy County Borough, Wales. It was created following a ward boundary review, effective from the 2022 Conwy County Borough Council election, by the merger of the former Betws-y-Coed ward and part of the Trefriw ward. Betws-y-Coed covered its namesake community of Betws-y-Coed, as well as the neighbouring communities of Dolwyddelan and Capel Curig. Subsequently the community of Trefriw has been added to create the latest ward.

According to the 2011 UK Census the population of the Betws-y-Coed ward was 1,244.

== County council elections ==
The Betws-y-Coed ward elected a county borough councillor to Conwy County Borough Council and, at the May 2017 election, the Betws-y-Coed seat was won by Liz Roberts for Plaid Cymru. Cllr Roberts first won the seat as an independent candidate in May 2004, subsequently being elected on the Plaid Cymru ticket at the following election in May 2008.

The Betws-y-Coed and Trefriw ward continued to elect one county borough councillor. At the May 2022 election the councillor for the former Betws-y-Coed ward, Liz Roberts, won the seat.

== See also ==
- List of places in Conwy County Borough (categorised)
