= 2012 Conwy County Borough Council election =

2012 Welsh local election

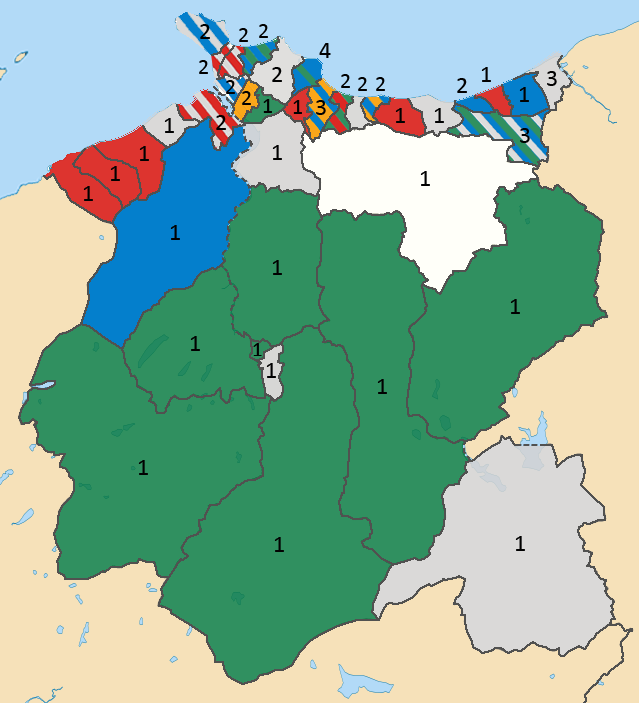
2012 election results map, showing numbers of councillors per ward and their party affiliations

The 2012 Conwy County Council election took place on 3 May 2012 to elect members of Conwy County Borough Council in Wales. It was on the same day as other 2012 United Kingdom local elections. The previous elections took place on 1 May 2008 and the next elections took place on 4 May 2017.

== Overview ==
Conwy County Borough Council election result 2012
Party	Seats	Gains	Losses	Net gain/loss	Seats %	Votes %	Votes	+/−
Independent	19 ^{[a]}			+5	32.2	30.0	10,831	+4.3
Conservative	13			-9	22.0	23.7	8,565	-5.7
Labour	10			+3	16.9	18.7	6,741	+4.3
Plaid Cymru	12			0	20.3	16.6	5,976	+1.7
Liberal Democrats	5			+1	8.5	10.1	3,648	-2.6
Christian	0			0	0.0	0.8	278	New
UKIP	0			0	0.0	0.2	57	New
BNP	-	-	-	-	-	-	-	-2.2
Green	-	-	-	-	-	-	-	-0.6
Alliance for Green Socialism	-	-	-	-	-	-	-	-0.6

^{[a]} Includes Betws yn Rhos councillor who did not declare his affiliation at the election

== Results by ward ==
(*) represents a candidate running from previous election. (~) represents an equivalent to a previous candidate.

=== Abergele and Pensarn ===
Abergele and Pensarn (1)
Party	Candidate	Votes	%	±%
Labour	Jean Stubbs*	407	55.1	+16.6
Independent	Ken Sudlow	186	25.2	+25.2
Conservative	Bernice McLoughlin	145	19.6	−24.4
Majority		221	29.9	+24.4
Turnout		738	36.3	−0.8
Labour gain from Conservative		Swing		

=== Kinmel Bay/Bae Cinmel ===
Kinmel Bay/Bae Cinmel (3)
Party	Candidate	Votes	%	±%
Independent	Nigel Smith	684	24.5	+24.5
Independent	Dr Stuart Anderson*	569	20.3	−0.4
Independent	Bill Darwin	450	16.1	+16.1
Conservative	John Bevan*	402	14.4	−14.5
Conservative	Ken Stone~	353	12.6	+12.6
Conservative	Geoffrey David Corry*	339	12.1	−11.8
Majority		115	4.1	−0.9
Turnout		2797	59.3	−1.3
Independent gain from Conservative		Swing		
Independent gain from Conservative		Swing		
Independent hold		Swing		

=== Betws-y-Coed ===
Betws-y-Coed (1)
Party	Candidate	Votes	%	±%
Plaid Cymru	Liz Roberts~	307	68.4	−12.4
Conservative	Michael Robert Skerrett~	142	31.6	+31.6
Majority		165	36.7	−24.8
Turnout		449	44.4	−0.4
Plaid Cymru hold		Swing		

=== Betws yn Rhos ===
Betws yn Rhos (1)
Party	Candidate	Votes	%	±%
Independent	Doctor Ahmed Jamil~	340	43.4	+43.4
Plaid Cymru	Clwyd Roberts~	219	27.9	+27.9
Independent	Bryn Jones~	167	21.3	+21.3
Independent	Eryl Ellis Williams~	40	5.1	+5.1
Independent	John Oddy~	18	2.3	+2.3
Majority		121	15.4	+15.4
Turnout		784	46.7	+46.7
Independent gain from Independent		Swing		

=== Bryn ===
Bryn (1)
Party	Candidate	Votes	%	±%
Labour	Andrew Hinchliff*	319	58.5	+5.8
Plaid Cymru	Gareth Wyn Jones*	226	41.5	+4.6
Majority		93	17.1	−2.2
Turnout		545	38.3	−14.6
Labour hold		Swing		

=== Caerhun ===
Caerhun (1)
Party	Candidate	Votes	%	±%
Conservative	Paul Gareth Roberts	352	40.6	+40.6
Independent	Goronwy Owen Edwards*	346	40.0	−20.3
Plaid Cymru	Terrance Jones	168	19.4	+19.6
Majority		6	0.6	N/A
Turnout		866	51.1	+3.5
Conservative gain from Independent		Swing		

=== Capelulo ===
Capelulo (1)
Party	Candidate	Votes	%	±%
Independent	Anne McCaffrey	292	48.4	+48.4
Independent	Darrell Owens	117	19.4	−9.8
Conservative	Gail Hall*	90	14.9	−19.3
Labour	Viv Mooney~	69	11.4	−11.1
Liberal Democrats	Steve Banwell~	35	5.8	−8.3
Majority		175	29.0	+23.9
Turnout		603	49.2	+7.0
Independent gain from Conservative		Swing		

=== Colwyn ===
Colwyn (2)
Party	Candidate	Votes	%	±%
Conservative	Cheryl Lynne Carlisle*	547	30.0	+0.2
Liberal Democrats	Brian Cossey*	515	28.3	−2.3
Labour	Mike Bird~	350	19.2	+1.1
Plaid Cymru	Dr. Sibani Roy	262	14.4	+14.4
Conservative	Blake Richard Bull	147	8.1	+8.1
Majority		32	1.8	+0.9
Turnout		1821	51.7	−9.1
Conservative hold		Swing		
Liberal Democrats hold		Swing		

=== Conwy ===
Conwy (2)
Party	Candidate	Votes	%	±%
Labour	Sara Louise Allardice	618	33.8	
Independent	Joan Vaughan *	471	25.8	
Plaid Cymru	Peredur Morris	233	12.8	
Independent	Neil Bryson	179	9.8	
Conservative	Jennifer Evans	179	9.8	
Conservative	David Martin Williams	146	8.0	
Turnout		1826	34.4	
Labour gain from Plaid Cymru		Swing		
Independent hold		Swing		

== By-elections between 2012–2015 ==
=== Caerhun (2013) ===
Conservative councillor, Paul Roberts, resigned in protest at how the local authority was being run. Edwards had lost the seat to Roberts at the 2012 election, but won it back at this by-election.

Caerhun by-election, 11 July 2013
Party	Candidate	Votes	%	±%
Independent	Goronwy Edwards	321	42.1	
Conservative	Neil Bradshaw	170	22.3	
Plaid Cymru	Peredur Morris	162	21.2	
Labour	Sian Peake-Jones	109	14.3	
Turnout		762	45.5	
Independent gain from Conservative		Swing		

=== Betws yn Rhos (2014) ===
Resignation of Independent councillor Ahmed Jalil.

Betws yn Rhos by-election, 6 February 2014
Party	Candidate	Votes	%	±%
Independent	Ifor Lloyd	347	46.0	N/A
Plaid Cymru	Clwyd Roberts	197	26.1	−1.8
Independent	Caroline Evans	127	16.8	N/A
Conservative	Bryn Jones	83	11.0	N/A
Majority		150	19.9	
Turnout		754	44.1	
Independent gain from Independent		Swing		

=== Abergele Pensarn (2014) ===
Labour councillor Jean Stubbs resigned and her husband Rick Stubbs won the seat at the by-election.

Abergele Pensarn by-election, 18 September 2014
Party	Candidate	Votes	%	±%
Labour	Richard Stubbs	160	25.9	
Independent	Michael Smith	134	21.7	
UKIP	Sarah Wardlaw	129	20.9	
Affiliation unknown	Kenneth Sudlow	74	12.0	
Independent	Barry Griffiths	56	9.0	
Conservative	John Edgar Hanson Pitt	54	8.7	
Independent	Val Parker	10	1.6	
Turnout		617	30.6	
Labour hold		Swing		
