= Craig-y-Don =

Suburb of Llandudno, Wales

Coordinates: 53.318°N 3.808°W

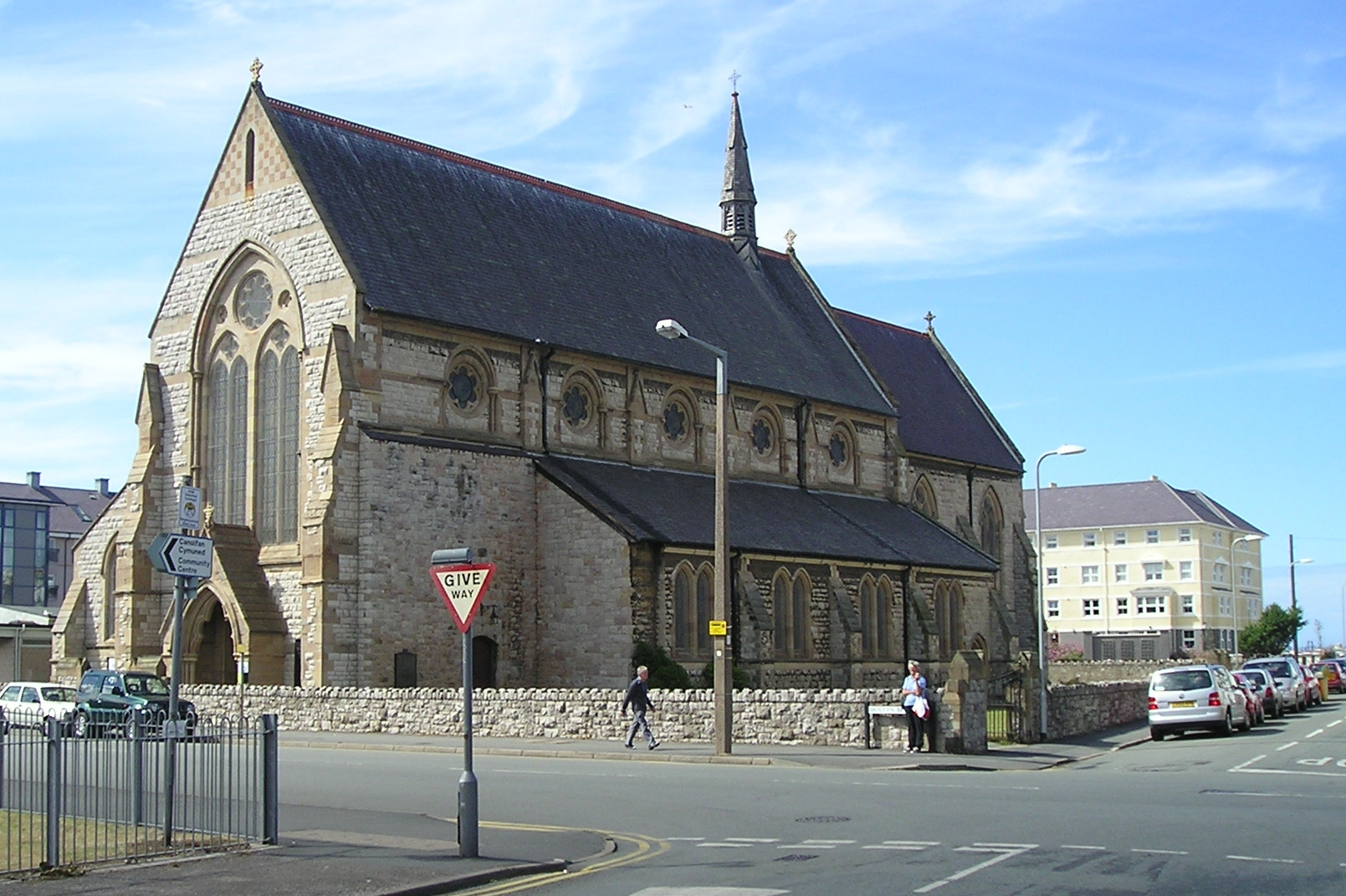
- St. Paul's Church, Mostyn Broadway, Craig-y-Don

- Location within Conwy
- OS grid reference: SH796816
- Community: Llandudno
- Principal area: Conwy
- Country: Wales
- Sovereign state: United Kingdom
- Post town: LLANDUDNO
- Postcode district: LL30
- Dialling code: 01492
- Police: North Wales
- Fire: North Wales
- Ambulance: Welsh
- UK Parliament: Bangor Aberconwy
- Senedd Cymru – Welsh Parliament: Aberconwy

Craig-y-Don is a suburb of Llandudno, a coastal seaside resort in Conwy county borough, north Wales. It is also an electoral ward to Conwy County Borough Council and Llandudno Town Council.

It is also part of the parish of Llanrhos.

== History ==
Land near Craig-y-Don was owned by the Mostyn family who built a manor house in Gloddaeth (now St David's College). The present house dates from the 16th century. The Mostyns also built a windmill at Hen Dwr, which later became the Bodafon Mountain Beacon, used as part of a warning system in the Napoleonic Wars.

In 1848, landowner Thomas Peers Williams named Craig-y-Don after his home at Beaumaris. From 1850 to 1880, the area was used for sand and clay mining with lime kilns on Nant y Gamar. The first modern house in Craig-y-Don was Ascot House built in 1870 on the eastern corner of what is now Carmen Sylva Road. From 1885, the area was developed as a suburb of Llandudno.

== Amenities ==
The suburb includes the eastern half of Llandudno Bay and its promenade starting at the roundabout on the Parade and comprising: East Parade, Craig-y-Don Parade, Bedford Crescent and the Colwyn Road through to the Little Orme to Penrhyn Bay. Properties on the Parade include hotels and residential or retirement flats beyond which on Colwyn Road are Bodafon Fields and the Craigside residential district. Opposite Bodafon Fields at the end of the promenade is a large paddling pool for children with a beach cafe and public facilities.

The parade is paralleled by Mostyn Broadway and Mostyn Avenue, the latter with Queen's Road forms the local shopping centre. Queen's Road (named in honour of Queen Victoria) leads from the promenade through to the pleasant residential area of Craig-y-Don where Roumania Drive and several other streets are named in memory of the visit to Llandudno in 1890 of Carmen Sylva (Queen Elisabeth of Romania).

On the hillside above Queen's Road is the North Wales Medical Centre, built in 1902 as Lady Forester's Convalescent Home (in memory of the 3rd Baron Forester) and since 1977 offering private medical treatment. Queen's Road continues to join Conway Road (leading to Llanrhos church) and Wormhout Way the A470 road leading to Llandudno Junction and the A55 road to Holyhead and Chester.

The Church in Wales parish church of St. Paul on Mostyn Broadway was built in 1893/95 as a memorial to Prince Albert Victor, Duke of Clarence on the corner of Clarence Road, which forms a junction with Mostyn Avenue. Other churches include Saint David's English Methodist church and Bethania Welsh Presbyterian church, both on Mostyn Avenue.

== Governance ==
Craig-y-Don was an electoral ward to Gwynedd County Council, in the Borough of Aberconwy, between 1989 and 1996.

Since 1995 the Craig-y-Don ward has elected two county councillors to Conwy County Borough Council. At the 1995 and 1999 elections the ward elected a Liberal Democrat and a Conservative Party councillor, though subsequently elected Independent candidates. and four town councillors to Llandudno Town Council. The total population of this ward taken at the 2011 census was 3,424.

== Source ==
- Wynne Jones, Ivor. Llandudno Queen of Welsh Resorts Landmark, Ashbourne, Derbyshire 2002 ISBN 1-84306-048-5.
