= Mochdre, Conwy =

Village and community in Conwy, Wales

Mochdre
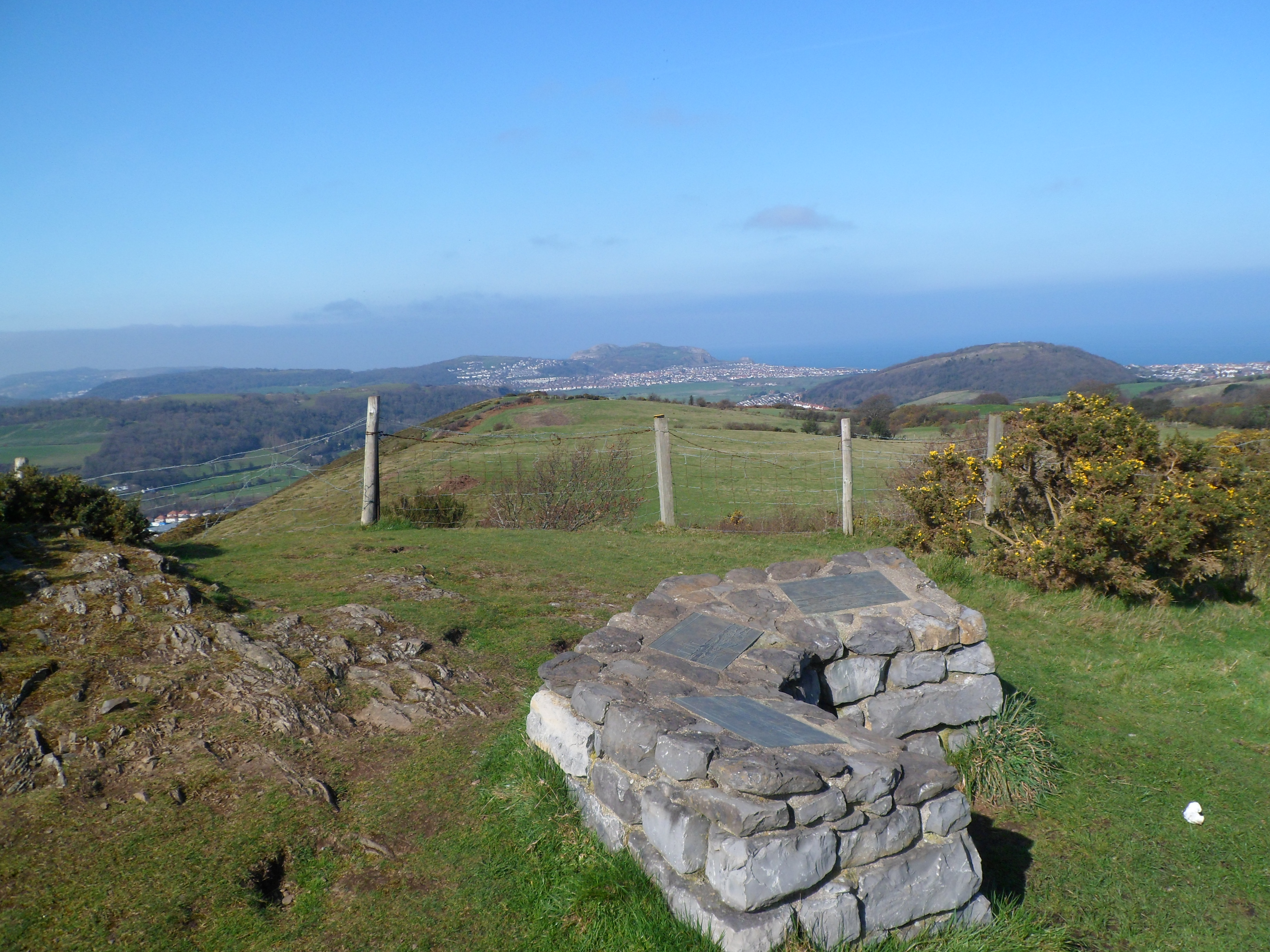
- The View (Welsh: Yr Olygfan)

- Location within Conwy
- Population: 1,923 (2011)
- OS grid reference: SH826786
- Community: Mochdre
- Principal area: Conwy
- Preserved county: Clwyd
- Country: Wales
- Sovereign state: United Kingdom
- Post town: COLWYN BAY
- Postcode district: LL28
- Dialling code: 01492
- Police: North Wales
- Fire: North Wales
- Ambulance: Welsh
- UK Parliament: Clwyd North
- Senedd Cymru – Welsh Parliament: Clwyd
- List of places UK Wales Conwy 53.29°N 3.76°W Map of the community

Mochdre ([ˈmoːχdrɛ]) is a village, community and electoral ward to the west of Colwyn Bay in Conwy County Borough, Wales. Originally part of the municipal borough of Colwyn Bay prior to local government reorganisation in April 1974, it is now a separate community whose population at the 2001 census was 1,862 increasing to 1,923 at the 2011 census. The village can be seen in its entirety from Bryn Euryn.

== Origin of the name ==
The name of the village comes from Welsh language words meaning pig (moch) and town (tref). The origin of the name is explained in one of the mythological Welsh tales known as the Four Branches of the Mabinogi, which were first written down in the early Middle Ages, but which actually go much further back into the history of oral Welsh storytelling. An incident in one of these tales, Math fab Mathonwy, concerns the theft of a herd of sacred pigs. One of the places where the stolen animals were kept overnight became known as Mochdre ("Pigtown") as a result.

== History and amenities ==
The village of Mochdre is noted for its parish church, which is actually the church of the parish of Llangwstennin as it allegedly sits on the site of the oldest Early Christian church in Wales.

It is the home of Mochdre Sports Football Club, which comprises a senior men's side, a recreational ladies side, and an extensive juniors section. The club's home ground is the MSA Sports Arena on Swan Road (Mochdre Sports Association) and shared with Mochdre Cricket Club.

Mochdre has a place in railway history. Sited on the North Wales Coast Line from Chester to Holyhead, it was the location of experimental trackside water troughs, from which passing steam locomotives could scoop up fresh water supplies without having to stop. The troughs were supplied with water from two square ponds to the south of the railtrack and in the fields of the old Eagles farm. The first infant School in Mochdre was held in the Methodist chapel schoolroom in Chapel Street. The station master's house was on the Llangwstennin side of the railway line. It was a two-storey redbrick building and the stationmaster in the 20s and early 30s was a Mr Stretton who, when the railway station closed, went to live in Tan-yr-allt Avenue, Mochdre. Above Llangwstennin Rectory was a shale quarry. The shale was crushed at the quarry and conveyed by a covered belt conveyor down to a siding on the main railway line where it was stored in silos to be taken to Ellesmere Port for use in cement manufacture. When the only road through Mochdre was along the old highway, Thornton steam lorries carrying ruby bricks used to stop on the bridge over the river and replenish their water tanks. These devices became commonplace around the world, but Mochdre was the first place they were ever used, around October 1860. Ironically the exact spot is now a stretch of the A55 dual carriageway, the railway line having been realigned slightly to the west when this section of the road was built in the mid-1980s. Here too was Mochdre & Pabo railway station, closed originally in January 1917 as a World War I economy measure, reopened in May 1919, and finally closed for good in January 1931. The area has been established an industrial area with much industrial and wholesale retail activity, notably Quinton Hazell, a large automotive accessories manufacturer being their base in the village. Latterly this complex is home to the Quinton Hazell Enterprise Park, incorporating mixed office and industrial accommodation.

== Governance ==
Mochdre is also the name of the electoral ward, whose boundaries are coterminous with the community. The ward elects a county councillor to sit on Conwy County Borough Council. It is currently (2022) represented by Cllr Stephen Price of the Welsh Labour Party.

The ward also elects or co-opts up to eleven community councillors to Mochdre Community Council.
