= Betws-y-Coed =

Village and community in Conwy, Wales

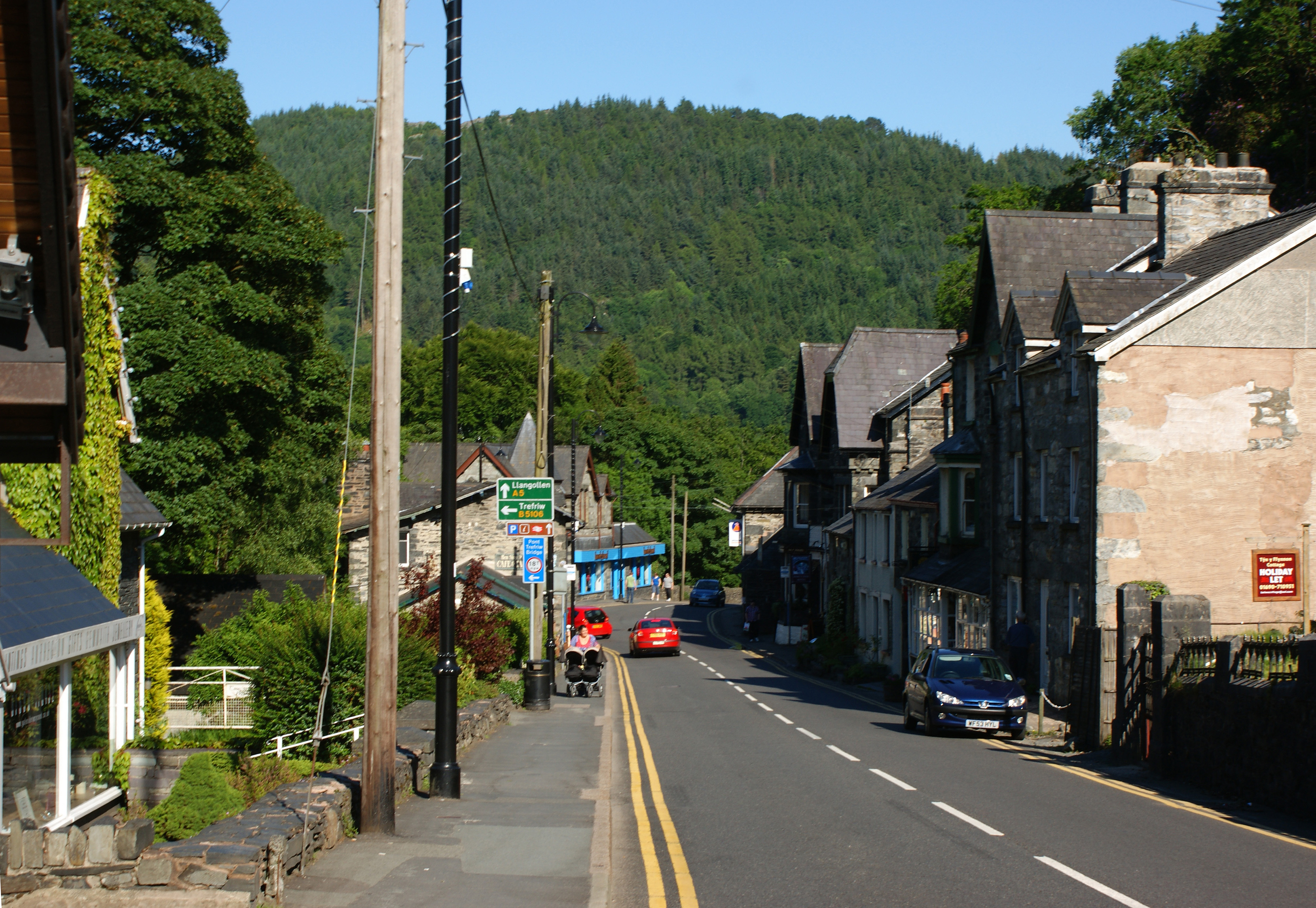
- A5 trunk road through Betws-y-Coed

- Location within Conwy
- Population: 476 (2011 census)
- OS grid reference: SH795565
- Community: Betws-y-Coed
- Principal area: Conwy
- Preserved county: Clwyd
- Country: Wales
- Sovereign state: United Kingdom
- Post town: BETWS-Y-COED
- Postcode district: LL24
- Dialling code: 01690
- Police: North Wales
- Fire: North Wales
- Ambulance: Welsh
- UK Parliament: Bangor Aberconwy
- Senedd Cymru – Welsh Parliament: Bangor Conwy Môn
- List of places UK Wales Conwy 53.092°N 03.801°W Map of the community

Betws-y-Coed (Welsh: [ˈbɛtʊs ə ˈkoːɨ̯d]) is a village and community in Conwy County Borough, Wales. The village is located near the confluence of the River Conwy and the River Llugwy and is on the eastern edge of Snowdonia. The population of the community as of the 2021 census was 476, a decline on the previous census.

The name of the village means "prayer-house in the woods", and a monastery is known to have existed in the area in the sixth century. The oldest parts of St Michael's Church, which lies to the north-east of the village, date to the fourteenth or fifteenth century. Betws-y-Coed remained a small agricultural community until the nineteenth century, when a lead mining industry developed and part of Thomas Telford's London to Holyhead road (the present A5) was constructed through the village in 1815, followed by a railway station in 1865. These new transport links encouraged new developments to serve tourists, such as the Church of St Mary, and the area became popular with landscape artists.

== Toponymy ==
The name of the village comes from the Welsh words betws (a borrowing from the Old English bed-hus 'a prayer-house' or 'oratory') and y coed ('the wood'). The name therefore means 'prayer-house in the wood'. The earliest record of the name is Betus in 1254.

The Welsh Language Commissioner gives the standard form of the name as Betws-y-coed, with a lower case 'c'. The local community council gives the name as Betws-y-Coed, with an upper case 'C'.

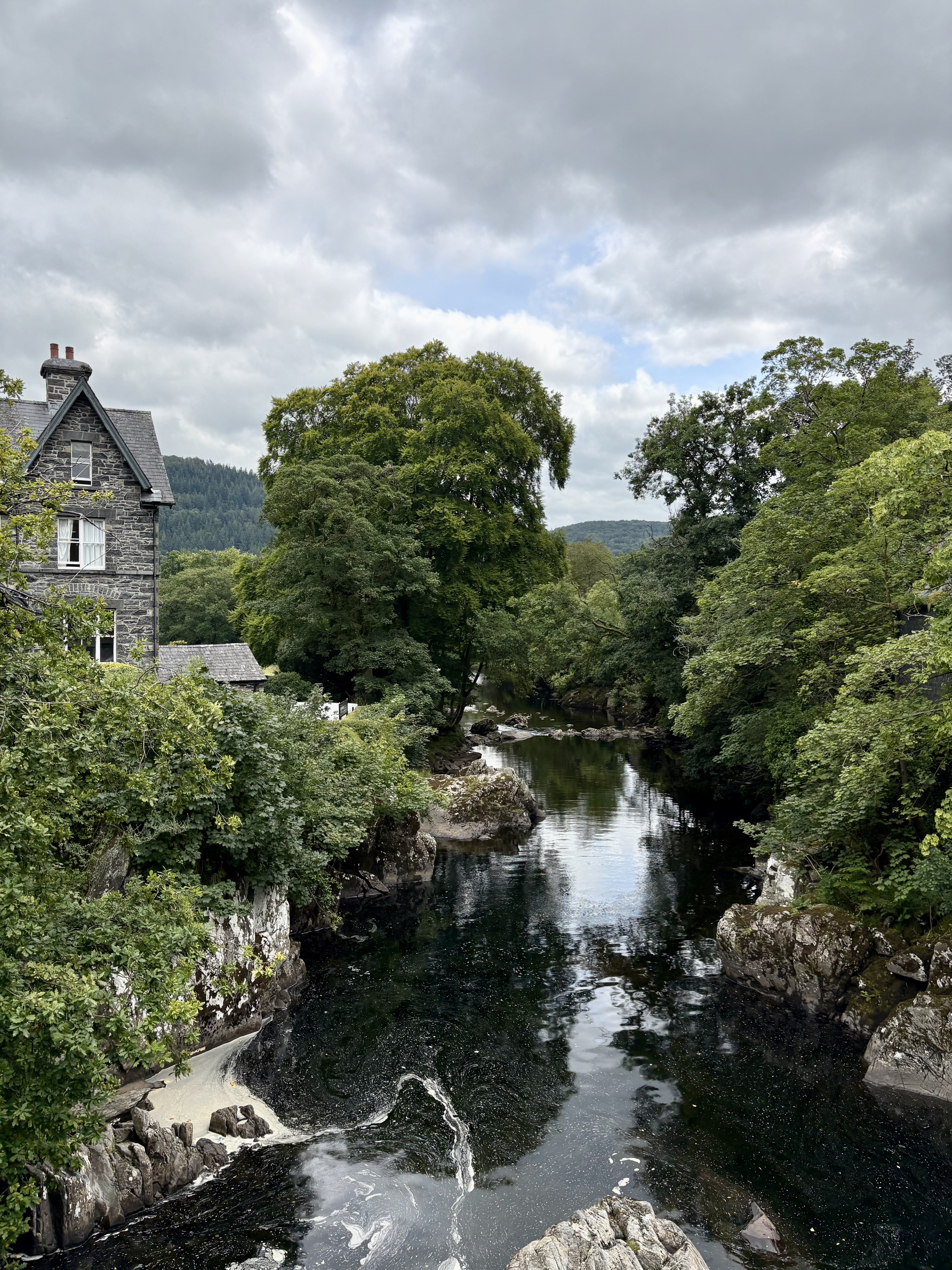
Betws-y-Coed Afton Llugwy view

== History ==
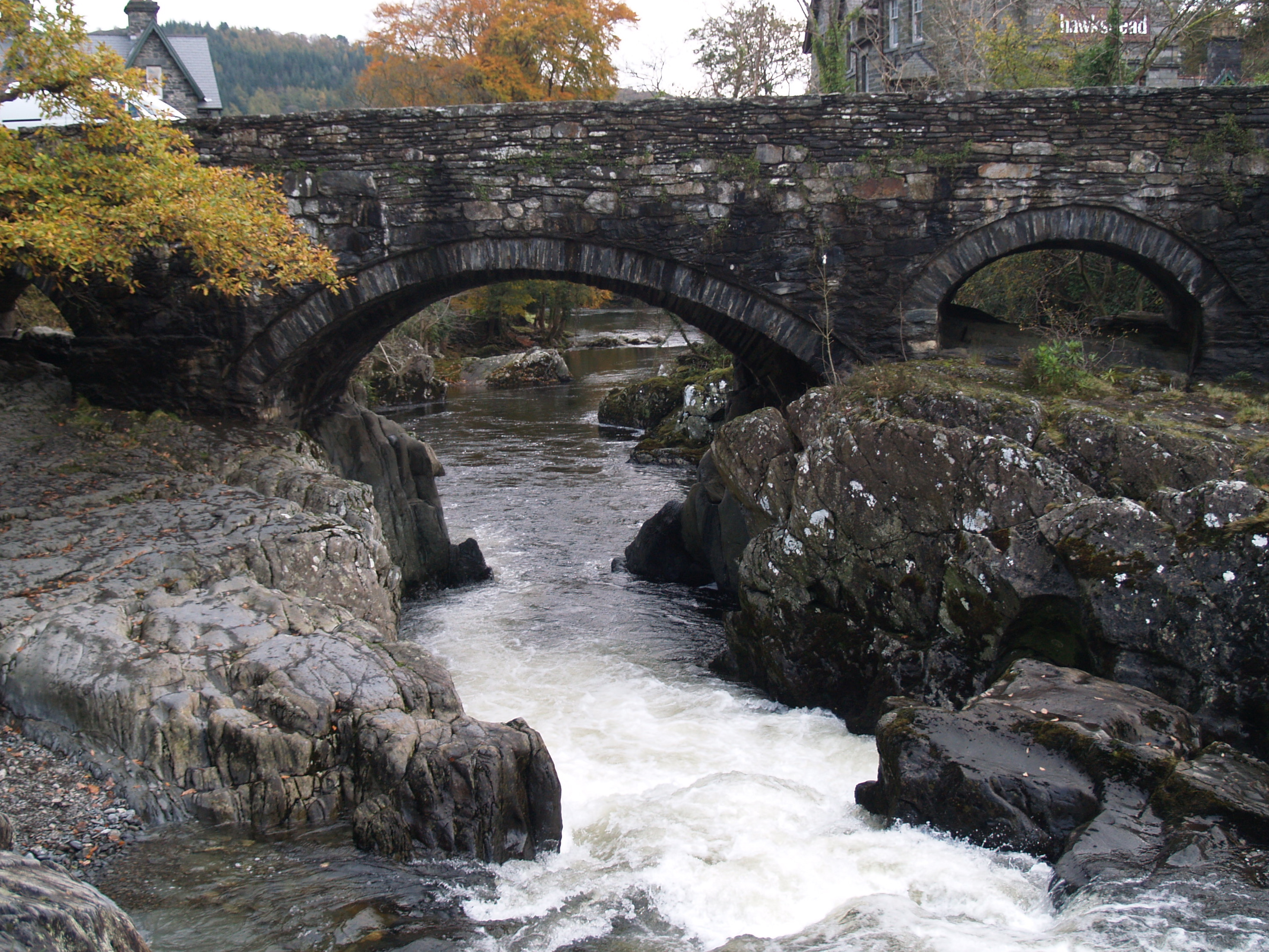
Pont-y-Pair Bridge over the River Llugwy

The village, which is now within Snowdonia National Park, stands in a valley near the point where the River Llugwy and the River Lledr join the River Conwy. The location is where a Celtic Christian community founded a monastery in the late 6th century AD. A village developed around the site over subsequent centuries. In the medieval period, the local lead mining industry brought miners and their families to the village.

Following the Acts of Union 1800 between Ireland and the UK, better transport links were proposed between the two countries. Surveyors decided that the best route for a road (now the A5) between London and Holyhead should pass through the village. In 1815, Waterloo Bridge, built by Thomas Telford, opened to carry the Irish Mail road across the River Conwy and through the village. The establishment of the route brought an economic boost to the area as the village became a major mail coach stop between Corwen (to the east) and Capel Curig (to the west). It also led to improvement of the roads to Blaenau Ffestiniog and to Llanrwst and Conwy.

In 1868, Betws-y-Coed railway station opened with the extension of the Conwy Valley line from Llanrwst. The railway was later further extended to serve the mineral industries in Blaenau Ffestiniog. With the arrival of the railway from Llandudno Junction railway station, the village's population increased by around 500 people.

The village was historically within Caernarfonshire, with the River Conwy at this point forming the border with Denbighshire.

== Places of worship ==
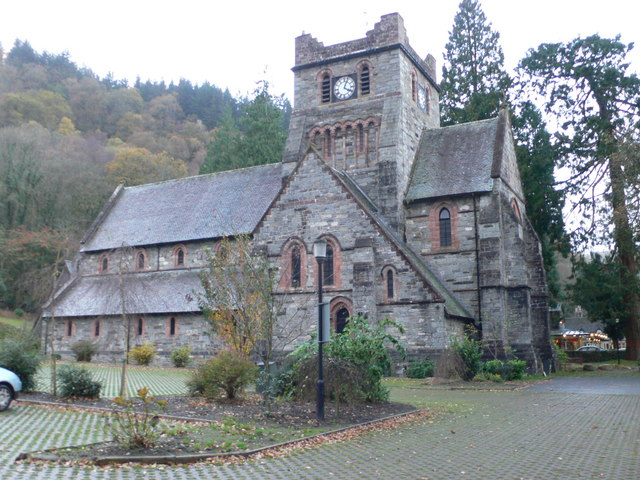
St Mary's Church in Betws-y-Coed

The Church of St Mary is an active Anglican parish church of the Church in Wales, in the deanery of Arllechwedd, the archdeaconry of Bangor and the diocese of Bangor. It is designated by Cadw as a Grade II* listed building.

The Anglican church was constructed to accommodate increasing numbers of summer visitors to the area. It replaced the earlier 14th century St Michael's Old Church, from which the village took the name Betws. The building, which cost £5,000 (equivalent to £470,000 in 2025), was designed by the Lancaster partnership of Paley and Austin. The principal benefactor was the Liverpool businessman Charles Kurtz. Work began on the village's former cockpit and fairground in 1870.

The church was consecrated in July 1873. Interior features include a wooden cross-beamed roof with walls and floors made from various types of stone, such as local bluestone, sandstone (floor tiles) from Ancaster, and black serpentine from Cornwall. There is seating for a congregation of 150 people.

The square bell tower was completed in 1907, although no bells were fitted. An integrated church hall was added in the 1970s; its commemorative stone was laid by the Earl of Ancaster in 1976.

The bells were eventually fitted in 2026 and fully rung for the first time on Easter Sunday 2026.

Also in the village is Bryn Mawr chapel, built in 1808 as a Calvinistic Methodist chapel, rebuilt in 1872 by Richard Owens, and still serving the Presbyterian Church of Wales.

== Governance ==
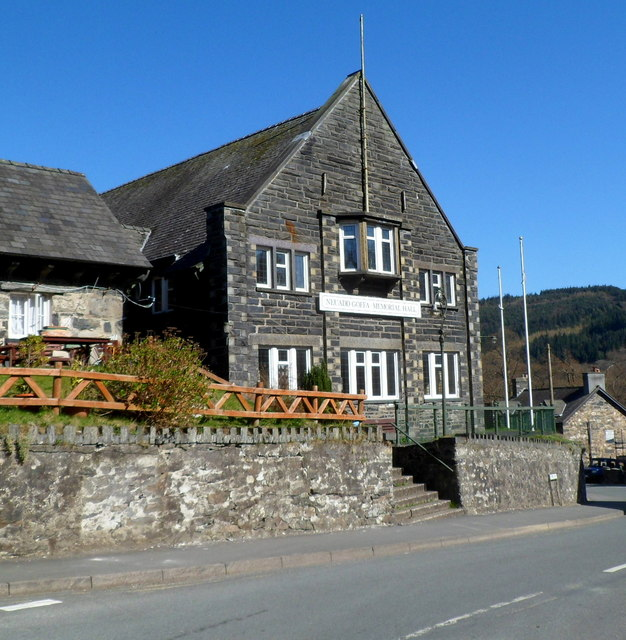
Betws-y-Coed Memorial Hall

There are two tiers of local government covering Betws-y-Coed, at community and county borough level: Betws-y-Coed Community Council and Conwy County Borough Council. The community council meets at the Memorial Hall on Mill Street (Pentre Felin).

The community, including the village itself and its immediate neighbourhood, has a population of 564. An electoral ward of the name Betws-y-Coed also exists. This ward includes a large additional area including two neighbouring communities Capel Curig and Dolwyddelan and has a total population of 1,244. The ward elects a county councillor to Conwy County Borough Council.

=== Administrative history ===
Betws-y-Coed was an ancient parish in the historic county of Caernarfonshire. When elected parish and district councils were created in 1894 it was given a parish council and included in the Bettws-y-Coed Rural District, which covered the Caernarfonshire parishes from the Llanrwst poor law union. The parish was converted into an urban district in 1898.

The official spelling was "Bettws-y-Coed" until 1950, when the urban district council changed it to "Betws-y-Coed", to respect modern Welsh orthography. The General Post Office adopted the same spelling as the council three years later in 1953.

Betws-y-Coed Urban District was abolished in 1974, with the area instead becoming a community. District-level functions passed to Aberconwy Borough Council, which in turn was replaced in 1996 by Conwy County Borough Council.

== Transport ==
=== Railway ===
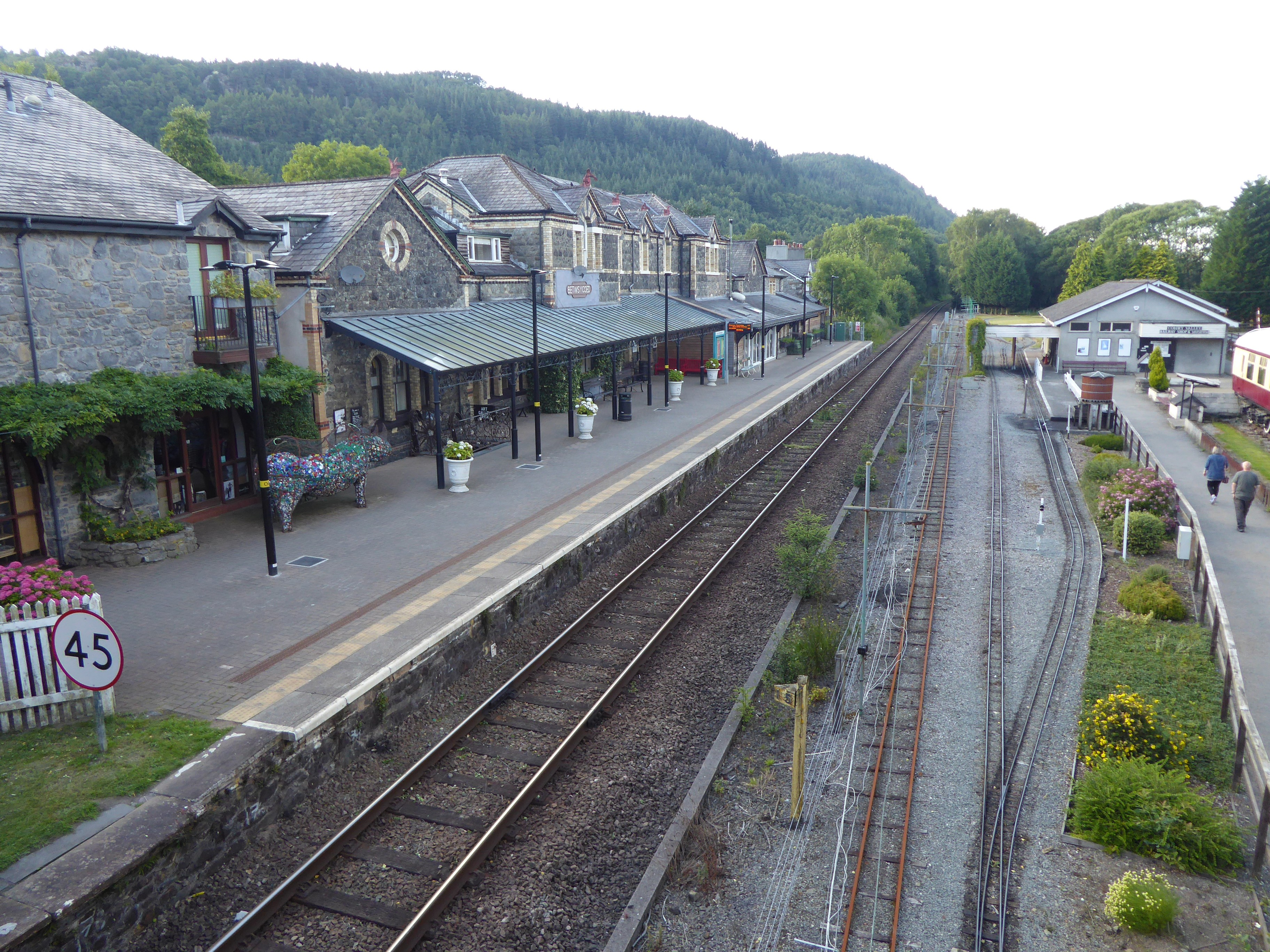
The railway station buildings

Betws-y-Coed railway station is a stop on the Conwy Valley line, with passenger services running approximately every three hours each way between Blaenau Ffestiniog and Llandudno. Services are operated by Transport for Wales.

The station buildings were constructed from local materials by local builder Owen Gethin Jones. The station had double platforms and an extensive goods yard. In LMS timetables, the station was listed as Betws-y-Coed for Capel Curig.

The Conwy Valley Railway Museum, with its extensive miniature railway, now occupies the former goods yard.

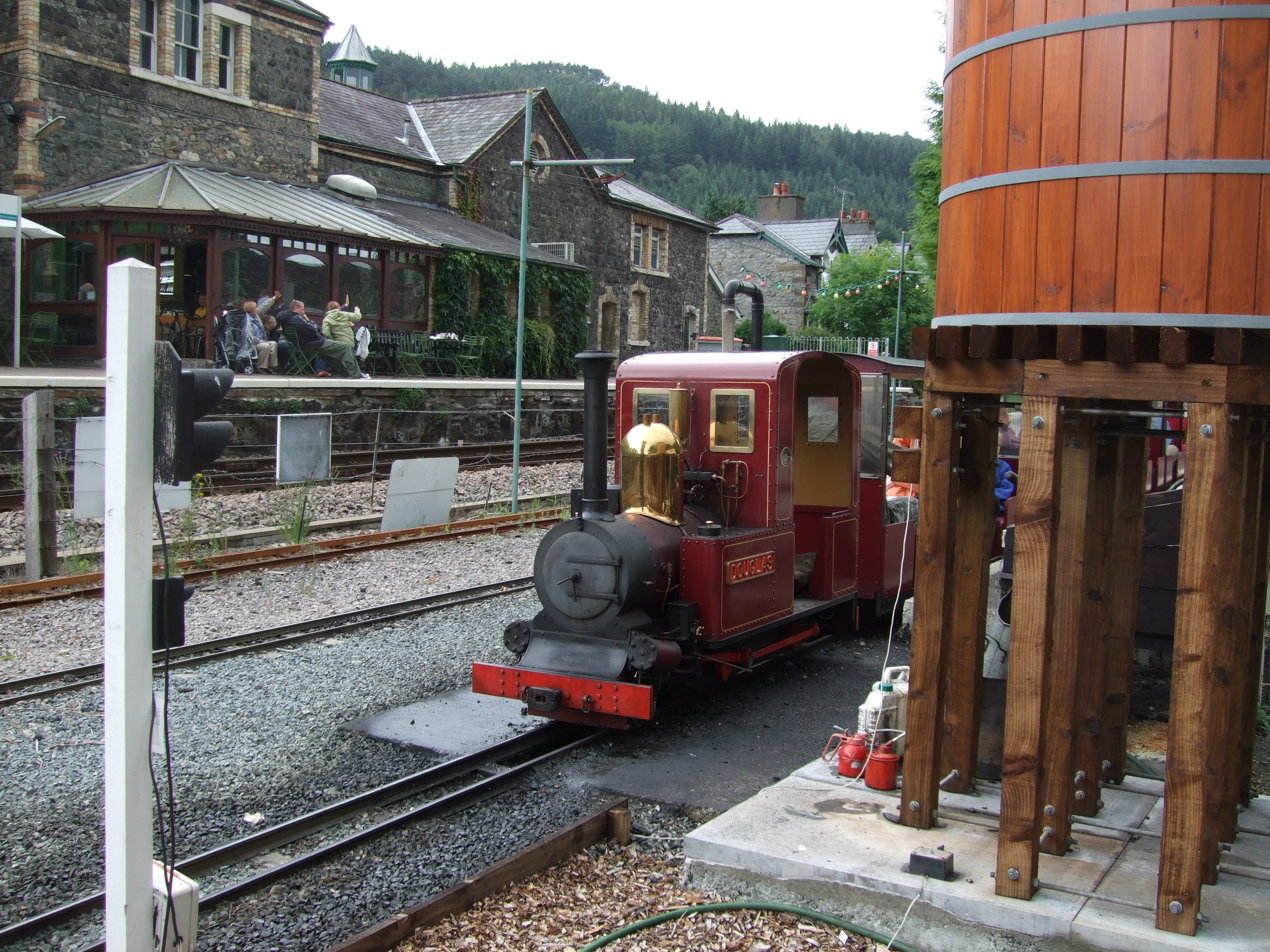
The miniature railway at the Conwy Valley Railway Museum runs adjacent to the Conwy Valley line at Betws-y-Coed

=== Buses ===
Local bus services are operated predominately by Llew Jones Coaches and Gwynfor Coaches. Routes connect the town with Llandudno, Llanberis, Llanrwst and Caernarfon.

=== Road ===
Since the opening of the A5 in the early 19th century, the village has been a primary destination for road signage in Snowdonia.

== Tourism ==
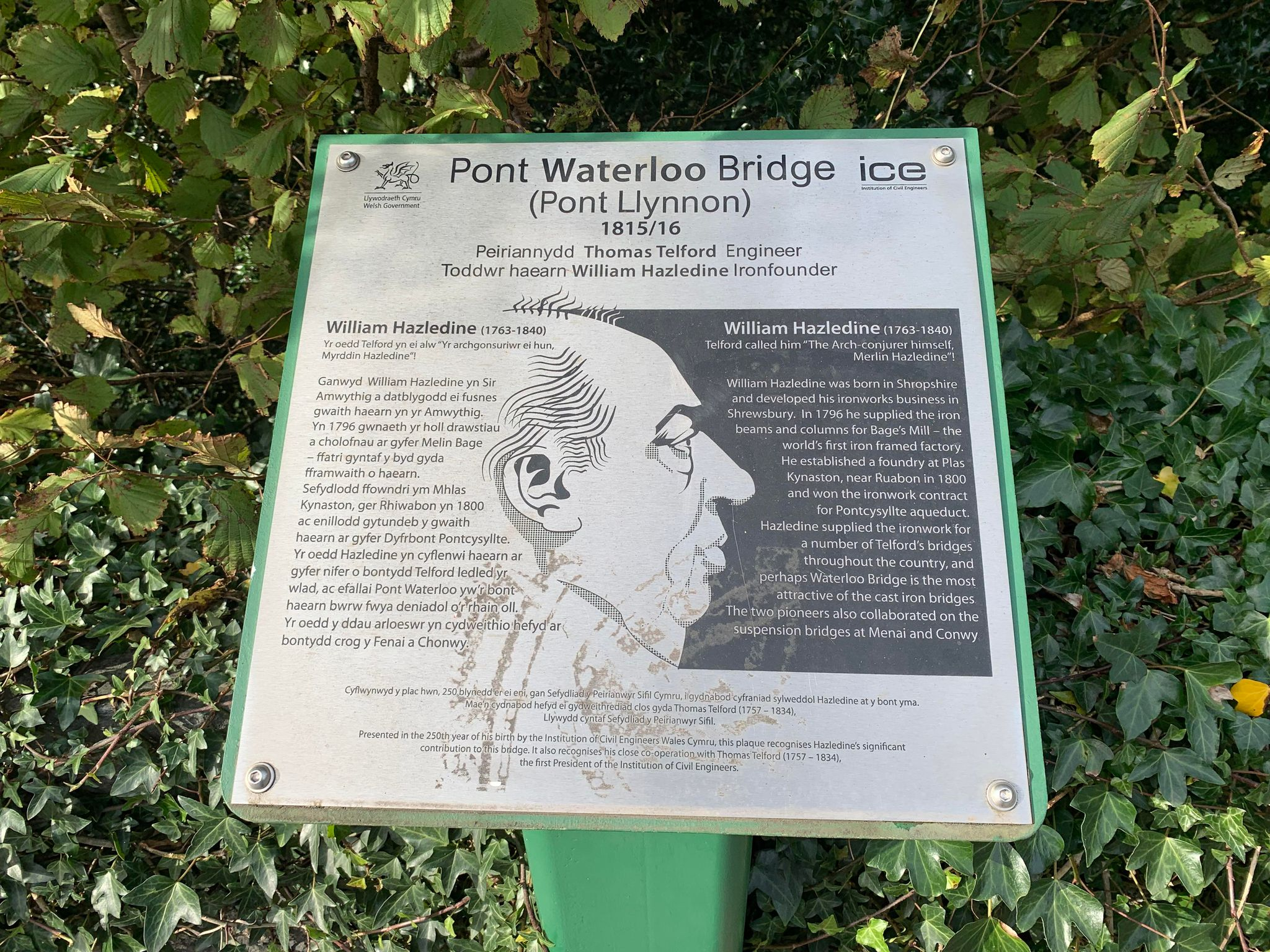
Information for visitors

The village is a centre for outdoor activities and lies within the Gwydir Forest.

The current Betws-y-Coed Golf Club was founded in the 1970s. There was an earlier club and course located on or near the Recreation Ground.

The Llyn Elsi reservoir nearby is used by walkers and anglers, and provides water for the village. Footpaths provide access to the lake, both from Betws-y-Coed itself and the outlying village of Pentre Du.

== Music ==
Melys, an independent rock band, was founded in Betws-y-Coed in 1997. The group, who sing in both English and Welsh, recorded eleven sessions for John Peel on BBC Radio 1 and came first in his Festive Fifty in 2001. They won Best Welsh-language Act at the Welsh Music Awards in 2002.
