= 2017 Conwy County Borough Council election =

2017 Welsh local election

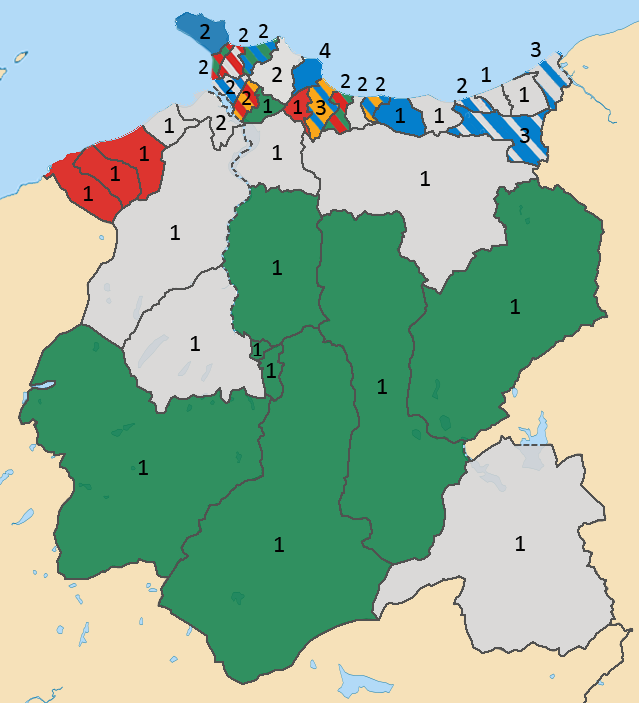
2017 election results map, showing numbers of councillors per ward and their party affiliations

The 2017 Conwy County Borough Council election took place on 4 May 2017 to elect members of Conwy County Borough Council in Wales. It was on the same day as other 2017 Welsh local elections. The previous elections took place on 3 May 2012.

59 Councillors across 38 Wards were elected/returned. Elections took place in 32 of the 38 wards, with the remaining six wards - Bryn, Caerhun, Eglwysbach, Llansannan, Llysfaen and Pandy - seeing their councillors returned without a contest.

== Overview ==
Conwy County Borough Council election result 2017
Party	Seats	Gains	Losses	Net gain/loss	Seats %	Votes %	Votes	+/−
Independent	20			+1	33.9	31.0		
Conservative	16			+3	27.1	37.0		
Plaid Cymru	10			-2	16.9	8.0		
Labour	8			-2	13.5	12.0		
Liberal Democrats	4			-1	6.8	9.0		
No party declared	1			+1	1.7	1.0		
UKIP	0			0	0.0	<1.0		

== Ward results ==
* = denotes sitting councillor in the ward prior to the elections

=== Abergele Pensarn (one seat) ===
Abergele Pensarn 2017
Party	Candidate	Votes	%	±%
Independent	Alan Hunter	455		
Labour	Dave Hancock	171		
Majority		284		
Turnout			32.0	
Registered electors		1,951		
Independent gain from Labour		Swing		

=== Betws-y-Coed (one seat) ===
Betws-y-Coed 2017
Party	Candidate	Votes	%	±%
Plaid Cymru	Liz Roberts *	352	75.8	
Labour	Kathy Coutanche	106	23.1	
Majority		246		
Turnout			48.9	
Registered electors		949		
Plaid Cymru hold		Swing		

=== Betws-yn-Rhos (one seat) ===
Betws-yn-Rhos 2017
Party	Candidate	Votes	%	±%
Independent	Ifor Glyn Lloyd *	630	80.6	
Independent	Dr Ahmed Jamil	149	19.1	
Majority		481		
Turnout			47.9	
Registered electors		1,631		
Independent hold		Swing		

Lloyd had first won the seat at a by-election in February 2014, replacing Dr Jamil who'd been councillor prior to this.

=== Bryn (one seat) ===
Bryn 2017
Party	Candidate	Votes	%	±%
Labour	Andrew Hinchliff *	unopposed		
Labour hold		Swing		

=== Caerhun (one seat) ===
Caerhun 2017
Party	Candidate	Votes	%	±%
Independent	Goronwy Owen Edwards *	unopposed		
Independent hold		Swing		

Edwards had won his seat back from the Conservatives at a by-election in July 2013.

=== Capelulo (one seat) ===
Capelulo 2017
Party	Candidate	Votes	%	±%
Independent	Kathleen Anne McCaffrey *	387	70.8	
Labour	Geoff Runciman	159	29.1	
Majority		228		
Turnout			47.0	
Registered electors		1,184		
Independent hold		Swing		

=== Colwyn (two seats) ===
Colwyn 2017
Party	Candidate	Votes	%	±%
Conservative	Cheryl Carlisle *	798		
Liberal Democrats	Brian Cossey *	726		
Labour Co-op	Paul Thomas Richards	429		
UKIP	Elspeth Griffiths	172		
Turnout			38.4	
Registered electors		3,318		
Conservative hold		Swing		
Liberal Democrats hold		Swing		

=== Conwy (two seats) ===
Conwy 2017
Party	Candidate	Votes	%	±%
Independent	Joan Mary Vaughan *	611	33.0	
Independent	Emma Leighton-Jones	504	27.2	
Labour	Emily Hannah Owen	434	23.7	
Liberal Democrats	Shari Barber	305	16.5	
Turnout		1854	38.6	
Registered electors		3,275		
Independent hold		Swing		
Independent gain from Labour		Swing		

=== Craig-y-don (two seats) ===
Craig-y-don 2017
Party	Candidate	Votes	%	±%
Conservative	Frank Bradfield *	740		
Plaid Cymru	Gareth Jones *	622		
Conservative	Francis Davies	595		
Plaid Cymru	Ray Khan	319		
Turnout		2,276	45.4	
Registered electors		2,800		
Conservative hold		Swing		
Plaid Cymru hold		Swing		
