= Grade II* listed buildings in Conwy County Borough =

Conwy County Borough shown within Wales

In the United Kingdom, the term listed building refers to a building or other structure officially designated as being of special architectural, historical, or cultural significance; Grade II* structures are those considered to be "particularly important buildings of more than special interest". Listing was begun by a provision in the Town and Country Planning Act 1947. Once listed, strict limitations are imposed on the modifications allowed to a building's structure or fittings. In Wales, the authority for listing under the Planning (Listed Buildings and Conservation Areas) Act 1990 rests with Cadw.

== Buildings ==
Name	Location Grid Ref. (Note: Sometimes known as OSGB36, the grid reference is based on the British national grid reference system used by the Ordnance Survey.) Geo-coordinates	Date Listed	Function	Notes	Reference Number	Image
Plas-yn-Llan (also known as Plas and Plas Llan)	Eglwysbach; SH8017270124; 53°12′53″N 3°47′45″W	31 January 1952		Located at the SW extremity of the village approximately 250m SE of the village school, and set with its rear against the slope of a hill; accessed via an unmetalled farm track.	64	Upload Photo
The Pin Mill	Bodnant Garden, Eglwysbach; SH7987372248; 53°14′01″N 3°48′04″W	31 January 1952	Pin mill	Located to the W of the house at the southern end of the Canal Terrace.	65	See more images
Llaethwryd	Cerrigydrudion; SH9404747916; 53°01′05″N 3°34′51″W	23 June 1967	Farmhouse	The large farm is located S of the Holyhead Road, between the Cwm-penanner road and the minor road running S, and approximately 1400m SW of the village centre.	72	Upload Photo
St Doged's Church	Llanddoged, Llanddoged and Maenan; SH8059263703; 53°09′25″N 3°47′14″W	23 June 1967	Church	Prominently sited in the centre of the village within a raised, circular churchyard with rubble revettment walls.	91	See more images
Church of St Michael	Llanfihangel Glyn Myfyr; SH9896749423; 53°01′57″N 3°30′29″W	23 June 1967	Church	The church stands in a modified oval churchyard, approximately 250m W of Llanfihangel Bridge on the road up the Afon Alwen valley.	92	See more images
Bodtegir Old Farmhouse	Llanfihangel Glyn Myfyr; SJ0061448299; 53°01′22″N 3°28′59″W	23 June 1967	Farmhouse	Bodtegir is a large farm SE of Llanfihangel, reached by a farm road across open ground from the minor road above the Alwen valley leading to Maerdy and Bettws Gwerful-goch. The old house lies at an angle close to the N side of the present house.	95	Upload Photo
Church of St Digain	Llangernyw; SH8751067445; 53°11′32″N 3°41′07″W	23 June 1967	Church	The parish church stands S of the centre of a roughly oval-shaped churchyard on the S side of Llangernyw village centre. The churchyard is entered through a lychgate at W.	97	See more images
Plas Tirion	Bro Garmon; SH8104959165; 53°06′59″N 3°46′43″W	23 June 1967	House	Prominently and imposingly sited, raised up slightly above the main Llanrwst-Betws-y-Coed road, and set back from it; accessed via a farm track running E from the road and sited across a hillslope.	109	Upload Photo
Hendre Wen	Bro Garmon; SH8067258817; 53°06′47″N 3°47′03″W	23 June 1967	Farmhouse	Set back from the main Llanrwst to Betws-y-Coed road at the western border of the community and accessed via its own farm track running W from the road; facing a farmyard to the S, behind low rubble forecourt walls.	110	Upload Photo
Cilcennus	Bro Garmon; SH8091258310; 53°06′31″N 3°46′50″W	23 June 1967	House	Set back from the main road in a prominent raised position on a hill slope; accessed from a lane running SE from the A470 to Capel Garmon.	112	Upload Photo
Cyffdy Hall (including attached Coach House)	Melin-y-Coed, Bro Garmon; SH8164760138; 53°07′31″N 3°46′13″W	23 June 1967	House	Prominently located on a hillside overlooking the Afon Cyffdy to the E, in its own parkland approximately 1km SE of Melin-y-Coed; accessed via a farm track running SW from the lane running from Melin-y-Coed towards Nebo.	123	Upload Photo
Soflen Farmhouse	Bro Garmon; SH8256557196; 53°05′56″N 3°45′19″W	29 March 1974	Farmhouse	Located approximately 1.3km NW of Nebo, immediately E of an unclassified lane running NW from Nebo to join the A470.	140	Upload Photo
Church of St Cynfran	Llysfaen; SH8932577489; 53°16′58″N 3°39′41″W	21 June 1950	Church	Prominently sited in the centre of Llysfaen village at the main cross-roads; located on a commanding site within a circular, rubble-walled graveyard.	142	See more images
St Trillo's Church	Rhos-on-Sea; SH8321280639; 53°18′35″N 3°45′15″W	21 June 1950	Church	Prominently sited surmounting a mound, in a large grave-yard.	143	See more images
Dinorben Hall	Abergele; SH9688274872; 53°15′39″N 3°32′50″W	6 October 1952		The farmhouse stands on high land, approximately 150m W of the minor road running S from the village of St George.	149	Upload Photo
Faerdre	Llanfair Talhaiarn; SH9626375442; 53°15′57″N 3°33′25″W	10 June 1952		Located on a rise at the NE boundary of the community, approximately 1km SW of the village of St George; accessed via a farm track running NW from Faerdre Hill lane and set behind low rubble enclosing walls.	150	Upload Photo
Garthewin	Llanfair Talhaiarn; SH9151270480; 53°13′13″N 3°37′35″W	10 June 1952		Strikingly located within an elevated parkland setting overlooking the Elwy valley 2km W of Llanfair Talhaiarn; accessed via a long metalled drive running NW from the main road.	158	Garthewin
Plas Uchaf	Llannefydd; SH9669471606; 53°13′53″N 3°32′57″W	6 October 1952		Strikingly-located to the W of, and in the shadow of, the Mynydd y Gaer, approximately 1.5km NW of Llannefydd village; accessed via a farm track running NW from the Llanfair to Llannefydd road, immediately W of the reservoir.	162	Upload Photo
Berain	Llannefydd; SJ0072669728; 53°12′55″N 3°29′17″W	6 October 1952		At the foot of a low hill near the cross-roads of the lanes leading from Bont Newydd and Henllan to Llannefydd village; set partly behind low rubble forecourt walls with a partly rock-cut and partly cobbled open courtyard in front.	163	See more images
Peniarth Fawr	Betws yn Rhos; SH9104574261; 53°15′15″N 3°38′05″W	30 January 1968		Located 0.5km NE of Betws-yn-Rhos village to the NW of an unclassified lane running NE from Betws towards Abergele; accessed via a farm track and set back slightly behind low rubble forecourt walls.	170	Upload Photo
Coed Coch	Betws yn Rhos; SH8812773970; 53°15′03″N 3°40′42″W	30 January 1968		Located in its own parkland setting approximately 0.7km SW of Dolwen; accessed via a long metalled drive running SW from the road.	172	See more images
Church of St Elian	Llanelian-yn-Rhos, Betws yn Rhos; SH8635676428; 53°16′22″N 3°42′20″W	30 January 1968	Church	Situated within a raised rubble-walled churchyard on a commanding site in the village centre, with views of the sea to the N.	177	See more images
Llan Farm	Betws yn Rhos; SH8635676346; 53°16′19″N 3°42′20″W	30 January 1968	Farmhouse	Located in the centre of the village at the main cross-roads with its gable at right-angles to the road; facing a small forecourt with part-enclosing whitened rubble walls.	178	Upload Photo
Plas Llanelian (also known as Plas Ucha)	Betws yn Rhos; SH8785875510; 53°15′53″N 3°40′58″W	30 January 1968		Located approximately 2km SE of Llanelian-yn-Rhos just beyond Llanelian school, at the end of a narrow lane.	181	Upload Photo
Church of St Mary	Llanfair Talhaiarn; SH9270870135; 53°13′03″N 3°36′30″W	30 January 1968	Church	Located on an elevated site high above the village centre within a rubble-walled churchyard.	182	See more images
C-shaped Agricultural Complex at Garthewin	Llanfair Talhaiarn; SH9145770543; 53°13′15″N 3°37′38″W	30 January 1968	Farm buildings	Located to the rear (NW) of Garthewin and enclosing cobbled estate yard on 3 sides.	185	Upload Photo
Plas Newydd	Llanfair Talhaiarn; SH9268771530; 53°13′48″N 3°36′33″W	30 January 1968		Located on an elevated site approximately 1.5km N of Llanfair village; immediately E of an unclassified lane running N beyond Llanfair from the A 548.	188	Upload Photo
Former Stable and Coach-house Range at Melai	Llanfair Talhaiarn; SH9012367740; 53°11′43″N 3°38′46″W	30 January 1968	Stable	Located immediately SE of Melai, facing the house; a cobbled pavement lies in front.	191	Upload Photo
Church of St Sannan	Llansannan; SH9340765900; 53°10′46″N 3°35′47″W	30 January 1968	Church	Within an irregularly shaped churchyard, set back from the N side of the A544 in the centre of the village of Llansannan.	212	See more images
Plas Isaf	Llansannan; SH9582567563; 53°11′42″N 3°33′39″W	30 January 1968		Set back slightly from the SE side of the B5382 at the NE end of the small hamlet of Bryn Rhydyrarian.	213	Upload Photo
Plas Uchaf	Llansanffraid Glan Conwy; SH8182575162; 53°15′37″N 3°46′23″W	30 January 1968		Located approximately 2.5km SE of Llansanffraid Glan Conwy overlooking the estuary on an elevated W-facing site; accessed via a farm track leading S from the B 5381.	220	Upload Photo
Tan-yr-Ogof Lodge including adjoining walls and towers to S, E and W	Llanddulas and Rhyd-y-Foel; SH9161178052; 53°17′18″N 3°37′39″W	27 October 1950		Prominently located on the roadside, some 60m E of the junction with Rhyd-y-Foel Road.	232	Upload Photo
King's Lodge, also known as Abergele Lodge	Abergele; SH9394077555; 53°17′04″N 3°35′32″W	27 October 1950		Located at the W end of the town, at the junction of a lane to Tan-y-Gopa and Betws-yn-Rhos.	233	Upload Photo
Church of St Michael	Abergele; SH9454577645; 53°17′07″N 3°35′00″W	27 October 1950	Church	Located in a rectangular churchyard in the angle between Water Street and Market Street, at the centre of the town, and accessed by the short Church Street off Market Street	237	See more images
Kinmel Hall Entrance Screen	Abergele; SH9816974926; 53°15′42″N 3°31′41″W	8 May 1997	Screen	The screen encloses the court d'honneur on the east, in front of the east entrance elevation of Kinmel Hall	18693	Upload Photo
Kinmel Hall Coach-house and Stable Range	Abergele; SH9814074836; 53°15′39″N 3°31′43″W	10 June 1970	Coach house	The stable range extends at right angles, at the south end of the main elevation of Kinmel, and set above of a series of 3 retained terraces.	18681	Upload Photo
Morfa Lodge	Abergele; SH9836577424; 53°17′03″N 3°31′33″W	10 April 1973	Lodge	This outer lodge to Kinmel Park is set at the angle of the Rhuddlan Road and the wooded avenue, Coed-y-drive, running N from the Golden Lodge.	240	Morfa Lodge
Plas Kinmel	Abergele; SH9802776547; 53°16′34″N 3°31′51″W	10 April 1973		Plas Kinmel is located on level ground on the E, at the bottom of Primrose Hill, St George.	243	Upload Photo
Plas Kinmel Farm West Range	Abergele; SH9799476568; 53°16′35″N 3°31′52″W	8 May 1997	Farm building	Plas Kinmel stands at the E at the bottom of Primrose Hill, N of St George village. The West Range continues the house to the N enclosing the farmyard on the W.	18707	Upload Photo
Plas Kinmel Farm North Range	Abergele; SH9802076598; 53°16′36″N 3°31′51″W	8 May 1997	Farm building	Plas Kinmel stands at the E at the bottom of Primrose Hill, N of St George village. This north range lies opposite the house and completes the enclosed farmyard.	18708	Upload Photo
Plas Kinmel Farm East Range	Abergele; SH9804676576; 53°16′35″N 3°31′50″W	8 May 1997	Farm building	Plas Kinmel stands at the E at the bottom of Primrose Hill, N of St George village. The East Range encloses the large stock yard of which the house forms the SW corner.	18709	Upload Photo
Plas Kinmel Piggery	Abergele; SH9806876560; 53°16′34″N 3°31′48″W	8 May 1997	Farm building	Plas Kinmel stands at the E at the bottom of Primrose Hill, N of St George village. The piggery lies on the E side of the E range of the farmyard, and behind the dovecote at the end of the S range.	18710	Upload Photo
Church of St Mary, with churchyard walls	Kinmel Bay and Towyn; SH9734279428; 53°18′07″N 3°32′31″W	10 April 1973	Church	The church lies immediately E of the Sandbank Road crossroads at the centre of Towyn, enclosed by a rectangular churchyard.	250	See more images
Tŷ'n Llan Nursing Home	Kinmel Bay and Towyn; SH9734779460; 53°18′08″N 3°32′31″W	10 April 1973	Nursing Home	Located immediately N of the Church of St Mary, with which it is linked.	251	Tŷ'n Llan Nursing Home
Towyn and Kinmel Bay Youth Club	Kinmel Bay and Towyn; SH9739879456; 53°18′08″N 3°32′28″W	10 April 1973	Youth club	One of a group of 3 buildings, set facing the main Rhyl to Abergele Road, immediately E of Sandbank Road at the centre of Towyn.	252	Upload Photo
Gatehouse at Gilar, with attached courtyard walls	Pentrefoelas; SH8839349911; 53°02′05″N 3°39′57″W	23 June 1967	Gatehouse	Gilar lies to the S of Rhydlydan, approached by a farm road. The gatehouse is on the N side of the front walled court, with an axial path leading directly to the porch of the E house.	263	Gatehouse at Gilar, with attached courtyard walls
Gilar	Pentrefoelas; SH8839349868; 53°02′04″N 3°39′57″W	31 January 1952		The group of buildings at Gilar lies apart, to the S of the hamlet of Rhydlydan, and is reached by a minor farm road.	264	Gilar
Pont Ysbyty Ifan	Ysbyty Ifan; SH8422148818; 53°01′27″N 3°43′40″W	17 March 1953	Bridge	Prominently located in the centre of the village and carrying the main road over the Afon Conwy.	3158	Pont Ysbyty Ifan
Cymryd	Henryd; SH7922875886; 53°15′58″N 3°48′44″W	17 March 1953		Strikingly sited on low-lying land on the W bank of the Conwy estuary, at the E boundary of the community; accessed via a long track leading E from Brynseiri Road.	3159	Upload Photo
Farchwel	Caerhun; SH7662370040; 53°12′47″N 3°50′56″W	13 October 1966		Prominently located above a bend in the main road (B5106) and set back to the W, approximately 1km SW of Caerhun; accessed via a long metalled track running W from the road.	3173	Upload Photo
Llanerch-y-Felin	Caerhun; SH7590872084; 53°13′53″N 3°51′38″W	13 October 1966		Located off the village lane to the N facing its former farmyard, now metalled; accessed via a short metalled lane.	3175	Llanerch-y-Felin
Church of St Curig	Capel Curig; SH7185257976; 53°06′13″N 3°54′56″W	13 October 1966	Church	Situated immediately W of the A 4086 (Capel Curig to Caernarfon road), on the S bank of the Afon Llugwy; approximately 300m NE of Plas-y-Brenin (the National Recreation Centre).	3178	Church of St Curig
Pont Gethin	Dolwyddelan; SH7797453870; 53°04′05″N 3°49′22″W	13 October 1966	Bridge	Spanning the Lledr valley dramatically at the western boundary of the community with that of Betws-y-Coed and spanning the A 470 Llanrwst to Dolwyddelan road; partly in Betws-y-Coed community.	3187	Pont Gethin
Church of St Peter	Llanbedr-y-Cennin, Caerhun; SH7607269567; 53°12′31″N 3°51′26″W	13 October 1966	Church	Prominently located on an elevated slope in the centre of the village, approximately 1km W of the Conwy Road (B5106); set within a circular rubble-walled churchyard.	3203	See more images
Church of St Mary	Trefriw; SH7807563221; 53°09′08″N 3°49′29″W	13 October 1966	Church	Prominently sited in the town centre within a raised, rubble-walled churchyard; on sloping ground, the W end set into a hill.	3219	See more images
St Michael's Church	Betws-y-Coed; SH7960056560; 53°05′34″N 3°47′58″W	21 June 1950	Church	Located on the W bank of the Afon Conwy, 100m E of Betws-y-Coed railway station.	3229	See more images
Pont-y-Pair	Betws-y-Coed; SH7916256711; 53°05′38″N 3°48′22″W	21 June 1950	Bridge	Carrying the B5106 and fording the Afon Llugwy in the centre of the town.	3230	See more images
Toll house at Conwy Suspension Bridge	Conwy; SH7830077470; 53°16′49″N 3°49′36″W	10 August 1981	Toll house	On the E side of Conwy Suspension Bridge.	3235	Toll house at Conwy Suspension Bridge
11 Castle Street	Conwy; SH7823277604; 53°16′53″N 3°49′40″W	23 September 1950	House	A detached building fronting the street.	3256	11 Castle Street
Deganwy Castle	Conwy; SH7822379438; 53°17′52″N 3°49′43″W	23 September 1950	Castle	Set across 2 steep hills known as The Fardre inland from the village, with panoramic view across Conwy, estuary, coastline and N Wales mountains.	3365	See more images
The Old Cockpit	Conwy; SH7805677575; 53°16′52″N 3°49′50″W	23 September 1950		Set back from the street and reached by a path to the side of Alfredo Restaurant.	3367	The Old Cockpit
Dovecote at Gloddaeth Hall, including attached single-storey blocks	Llandudno; SH8035580710; 53°18′35″N 3°47′50″W	16 March 1976	Dovecote	About 100m E of Hall, to S of former stables.	3415	Upload Photo
Penrhyn Old Hall, including forecourt wall, steps and mounting block	Llandudno; SH8155581535; 53°19′03″N 3°46′46″W	16 March 1976	Restaurant	On NW side of Penrhyn Old Road, about 250m W of roundabout at bottom of Penrhyn Hill.	3467	Penrhyn Old Hall, including forecourt wall, steps and mounting block
Bryn-y-Neuadd Farmhouse, including attached dairy	Llanfairfechan; SH6799174777; 53°15′13″N 3°58′49″W	14 April 1992		At E end of grounds of Bryn-y-Neuadd Hospital, reached from Aber Road by driveway almost opposite War Memorial (SH 680 747). At SW corner of farmyard.	3518	Upload Photo
Church Institute	Llanfairfechan; SH6830874796; 53°15′14″N 3°58′32″W	14 April 1992	Church Institute	Parallel to road opposite junction with The Close.	3565	Upload Photo
Wern Isaf (formerly Rose Briars)	Llanfairfechan; SH6860675109; 53°15′24″N 3°58′16″W	31 May 1990		Reached from Park Road along private drive uphill to NE of Llanfairfechan; sited high above Penmaenmawr Road with extensive views over Conwy Bay to Puffin Island and Anglesey.	3567	Upload Photo
Tŷ Mawr Wybrnant	Bro Machno; SH7697952410; 53°03′17″N 3°50′13″W	13 October 1966		At head of Wybrnant Valley approx 2.5 km NW of Penmachno. Best reached via signposted minor road branching N off Penmachno-Glasgwm road approx 700m W of Penmachno village centre.	3578	See more images
Felin Isaf Mill	Pentrefelin, Llansanffraid Glan Conwy; SH8028274938; 53°15′28″N 3°47′46″W	22 December 1975	Mill	Located below the A 496 on the W side at Pentrefelin; accessed via a short drive from an unclassified road leading W opposite Bont Newydd.	3630	Upload Photo
Grand Theatre	Llandudno; SH7912082013; 53°19′16″N 3°48′58″W	16 March 1976	Theatre	On corner with Irving Road.	3633	See more images
Church of All Saints	Deganwy, Conwy; SH7832979018; 53°17′39″N 3°49′37″W	24 June 1986	Church	Set against a steep hillside behind the seafront houses near Deganwy Pier, beyond a short lane off the A546.	3635	See more images
St Mary's Church	Betws-y-Coed; SH7936656449; 53°05′30″N 3°48′10″W	21 January 1988	Church	Located immediately to the SW of the main road (A5) in the centre of the town.	3640	See more images
Llandudno Pier, including Stone Lodge, Pier End Pavilions, Kiosks and remains of Pier Pavilion	Llandudno; SH7835582930; 53°19′45″N 3°49′41″W	24 March 1969	Pier	At N end of The Promenade.	3641	See more images
Ysgubor-y-Glyn (adjacent to Capel Curig Training Camp).	Capel Curig; SH7508957511; 53°06′01″N 3°52′02″W	10 April 1990		Located off the main road to the S, immediately adjacent to the Capel Curig Training Camp, approximately 1km W of the Tŷ Hyll (Ugly House).	3647	Upload Photo
Statue of Hercules and pedestal at Gloddaeth Hall	Llandudno; SH8027280643; 53°18′33″N 3°47′54″W	16 March 1976	Statue	Sited in garden about 50m SE of front of Hall.	5775	Upload Photo
Church of St Hilary	Conwy; SH7932580321; 53°18′22″N 3°48′45″W	1 October 1951	Church	In a large churchyard N of the main settlement.	5776	See more images
Church of St Tudno	Llandudno; SH7697383830; 53°20′13″N 3°50′57″W	1 October 1951	Church	On NE slopes of Great Orme, in a hollow known as Pant yr Eglwys.	5797	See more images
Benar farmhouse, including forecourt wall and stairs	Bro Machno; SH7942051771; 53°02′58″N 3°48′01″W	13 October 1966	Farmhouse	On prominent hillside site above Afon Machno to NW of B4406.	5851	Upload Photo
Fedw Deg Old Farmhouse	Bro Machno; SH7891853283; 53°03′47″N 3°48′30″W	13 October 1966	Farmhouse	Above Lledr valley reached from forest track at SH 798 539 (near Tan-yr-allt) taking first L and then first R turnings.	5895	Upload Photo
Pen-y-Bryn Farmhouse and attached agricultural range	Bro Machno; SH7869450294; 53°02′10″N 3°48′38″W	13 October 1966	Farmhouse	Above and to NW of road approx 400 metres SW of Penmachno church. House faces roughly SE behind small stone-walled front garden.	5907	Upload Photo
Pen-y-Bryn barn	Bro Machno; SH7869950309; 53°02′11″N 3°48′38″W	13 October 1966	Barn	To N of and at a right angle to farmhouse.	5908	Upload Photo
Coed-y-Ffynnon	Bro Machno; SH8038153028; 53°03′40″N 3°47′11″W	13 October 1966		Approx 300m NW of Penmachno Woollen Mill, reached via forestry tracks branching off minor road to SW of Pandy Mill at SH 806 530.	5918	Upload Photo
St Paul's Church	Colwyn Bay; SH8501878828; 53°17′38″N 3°43′36″W	25 July 1994	Church	Occupies a block of land at the centre of the town between Woodland Road East and Rhiw Road.	14657	See more images
Christ Church	Bryn-y-Maen, Colwyn Bay; SH8362476150; 53°16′10″N 3°44′47″W	25 July 1994	Church	Forms the focal point of the small hillside hamlet of Bryn y Maen, approx 3km S of the town.	14722	See more images
Church of Saint John	Old Colwyn; SH8694678411; 53°17′26″N 3°41′51″W	9 September 1994	Church	On the corner of Station Road and Cliff Road.	14863	See more images
Raised walk at Gwydir Castle	Trefriw; SH7988961021; 53°07′58″N 3°47′48″W	30 May 1996	Walkway	Listed as a mid-Tudor carved courtyard or garden arch, with associated walls. Additional NG Ref's 27970 36097 to 27988 to 36107 Group value with other listed items at Gwydir Castle.	16938	Upload Photo
Former Oat Kiln at Felin Isaf	Llansanffraid Glan Conwy; SH8026074958; 53°15′29″N 3°47′47″W	1 May 1996	Oat Kiln	Located immediately to the N of the main and clover mills at Felin Isaf.	17042	Upload Photo
Condover House (formerly Villa Marina)	Llandudno; SH8060782259; 53°19′26″N 3°47′38″W	13 June 1996		On north (sea) side of Colwyn Road, near W flank of Little Orme.	17095	Condover House (formerly Villa Marina)
Clover Mill	Llansanffraid Glan Conwy; SH8027374945; 53°15′29″N 3°47′46″W	22 December 1975	Clover Mill	Located below the A 496 on the W side at Pentrefelin; accessed via a short drive from an unclassified road leading W opposite Bont Newydd.	17320	Upload Photo
Hendre-fawr	Abergele; SH9634076905; 53°16′44″N 3°33′22″W	8 May 1997		Located on fertile drained flat lands between Abergele and Rhuddlan, and accessed by a farm road, 1m E of Abergele.	18713	Upload Photo
Church of St Cynbryd	Llanddulas and Rhyd-y-Foel; SH9085478211; 53°17′23″N 3°38′20″W	11 December 1997	Church	Located in the centre of the village on the north bank of the Afon Dulas, within its own large, rubble-walled churchyard.	19024	See more images
Hen Wrych Lodge including adjoining crenellated boundary walls and towers	Llanddulas and Rhyd-y-Foel; SH9280878076; 53°17′20″N 3°36′34″W	11 December 1990	Lodge	Facing the road at the eastern boundary of the community, approximately 600m NE of Gwrych Castle	19039	Upload Photo
Plas Tan-yr-Ogof including adjoining walls and arches to E and W	Llanddulas and Rhyd-y-Foel; SH9163478074; 53°17′19″N 3°37′37″W	11 December 1997	House	Located on the roadside approximately 80m E of the junction with Rhyd-y-Foel Road.	19040	Upload Photo
Tan-yr-Ogof Farmhouse including adjoining arch and walls to E	Llanddulas and Rhyd-y-Foel; SH9167878069; 53°17′19″N 3°37′35″W	11 December 1997	Farmhouse	Located on the roadside approximately 100m E of the junction with Rhyd-y-Foel Road.	19041	Upload Photo
L-shaped Agricultural Range at Berain	Llannefydd; SJ0071469767; 53°12′56″N 3°29′18″W	15 May 1998	Farm building	Located immediately NW of Berain, partly enclosing a large farmyard.	19855	Upload Photo
Voelas	Pentrefoelas; SH8498651540; 53°02′55″N 3°43′02″W	19 October 1998	House	Voelas Estate lies on the W edge of the community, W of Pentrefoelas. The house stands in its own parkland overlooking the picturesque narrow valley of the Afon Conwy.	20585	Upload Photo
Old House and attached Cartshed block at Cysulog	Llangwm; SJ0099845106; 52°59′39″N 3°28′35″W	20 May 2003	House	Cysulog is about 1 km north of Maerdy. The Old House and Cartshed block is to the NW of the present house.	80944	Upload Photo

== See also ==
- Grade I listed buildings in Conwy County Borough
- List of scheduled monuments in Conwy County Borough
- Registered historic parks and gardens in Conwy County Borough
