= Registered historic parks and gardens in Conwy County Borough =

List of buildings in county borough of Wales

Conwy County Borough shown within Wales

Conwy County Borough is a county borough in the north of Wales. It covers an area of 1,126 km^{2} (435 sq mi) and had a population of approximately 114,800 in 2021.

The Cadw/ICOMOS Register of Parks and Gardens of Special Historic Interest in Wales was established in 2002 and given statutory status in 2022. It is administered by Cadw, the historic environment agency of the Welsh Government. Elisabeth Whittle described Cadw as having a "somewhat special and guiding role" in the preservation of historic parks and gardens, since they are "an integral part of Welsh archaeological and architectural heritage". The register includes just under 400 sites, ranging from gardens of private houses, to cemeteries and public parks. Parks and gardens are listed at one of three grades, matching the grading system used for listed buildings. Grade I is the highest grade, for sites of exceptional interest; Grade II*, the next highest, denotes parks and gardens of great quality; while Grade II denotes sites of special interest.

There are 23 sites on the register of parks and gardens in Conwy County Borough. (Note: This list does not include Kinmel Hall for which the Cadw record gives the Unitary Authority as Denbighshire.) Four are listed at Grade I, four at Grade II*, and 15 at Grade II.

== Key ==
Grade	Criteria
I	Parks and gardens of exceptional interest
II*	Parks and gardens of great quality
II	Parks and gardens of special interest

== List of parks and gardens ==
List of parks and gardens
Name	Location Grid Ref. (Note: Sometimes known as OSGB36, the grid reference is based on the British national grid reference system used by the Ordnance Survey.) Geo-coordinates	Date Listed	Description / Notes	Grade	Reference Number	Image
Benarth Hall	Henryd; SH7868176780; 53°16′26″N 3°49′10″W	1 February 2022	Park and gardens The early twentieth century garden layout is set within woodlands and parkland possibly contemporary with the house of 1790. The late eighteenth or early nineteenth-century walled kitchen gardens to the south-west of the house cover almost 3 acres (1.2 ha).	II	PGW(Gd)10(CON)	Benarth Hall
Bodnant	Llansanffraid Glan Conwy; SH7981872315; 53°14′02″N 3°48′03″W	1 February 2022	Park and gardens The late-Georgian house is set within what Cadw describes as "an outstanding garden in an extremely picturesque setting". The estate was bought in the 1870s by Henry Pochin who engaged Edward Milner to design the gardens around the house. After Pochin died the gardens were further developed by his daughter (Baroness Aberconway) and grandson (2nd Baron Aberconway), with the creation of five terraces between 1905 and 1914.	I	PGW(Gd)5(CON)	a pond overlooked by a formal terrace and country house
Bodysgallen	Llandudno; SH7989379357; 53°17′50″N 3°48′08″W	1 February 2022	Parks and gardens The gardens probably have their origins in the early seventeenth century, contemporary with the house, and their style and layout is much influenced by the hilltop location of the house. Formal terraced gardens surround the house and the eighteenth-century kitchen garden and the walled rose garden (the former kitchen garden) lie to the south-west.	I	PGW(Gd)7(CON)	a Tudor-Gothic house above a series of garden terraces
Bryn Eisteddfod	Llansanffraid Glan Conwy; SH8060576904; 53°16′31″N 3°47′27″W	1 February 2022	Gardens The house was built the 1760s with later alterations. A plan of the estate from 1776 shows that the main elements of the garden had been established by this time, though does not show the drives or the kitchen garden which is dated to 1841. The two grade II listed lodges at either end of a long drive were built in c. 1833.	II*	PGW(Gd)8(CON)	Bryn Eisteddfod
Caer Rhun Hall	Caerhun; SH7753570584; 53°13′04″N 3°50′04″W	1 February 2022	Park and Gardens The present house was built in the 1890s for Major-General Hugh Sutlej Gough. The early nineteenth century layout of the park was left largely unchanged but the garden was redesigned with an earlier kitchen garden being replaced. To the east of the house is the site of a Roman fort upon which is a Grade I listed medieval church.	II	PGW(Gd)12(CON)	a country house of limestone and red sandstone, viewed across a lawn
Coed Coch	Betws yn Rhos; SH8832774106; 53°15′07″N 3°40′26″W	1 February 2022	Park and gardens The River Dulas passes through the pleasure grounds to the south-west of the house and across the northern section of the eighteenth and nineteenth century landscape park. The pleasure grounds surrounding the house are separated from the park by a ha-ha.	II	PGW(Gd)56(CON)	The manor house viewed over the parkland
Condover House	Llandudno; SH8051982292; 53°19′26″N 3°47′39″W	1 February 2022	Country house garden The house and gardens were both created in c. 1936 with similarities in style that suggest that both were the work of Harry Weedon who designed the house.	II*	PGW(Gd)50(CON)	Condover House
Cotswold, Brackley Avenue	Colwyn Bay; SH8434579055; 53°17′44″N 3°44′08″W	1 February 2022	Garden The Arts and Crafts town garden was first laid out in 1911 when the house was built. A Japanese garden was established along the south-west side of the garden in c. 1920.	II	PGW(Gd)60(CON)	
The Flagstaff	Colwyn Bay; SH8358178959; 53°17′40″N 3°44′49″W	1 February 2022	Woodland garden Formal and informal gardens were laid out by Thomas Hayton Mawson in 1898–99. The general layout of these is still visible, but has been overlain with various buildings and enclosures since 1963 when the gardens became home to the Welsh Mountain Zoo.	II	PGW(Gd)61(CON)	Sea Lion Rock, a pool with sea lions and a keeper, and people watching from the surrounding fence
Garthewin	Llanfair Talhaiarn; SH9149770748; 53°13′21″N 3°37′31″W	1 February 2022	Park and gardens The pleasure gardens are contemporary with the house of c. 1700–1710, though with later plantings and modifications. The park was laid out before 1844, and probably within the previous sixty years as it is not indicated on the estate map of 1784.	II	PGW(Gd)53(CON)	a large stone house
Gloddaeth (St. David's College)	Llandudno; SH8008380598; 53°18′30″N 3°48′00″W	1 February 2022	Park and garden The terraced gardens and formal canal are to the south-east of the house and date to the seventeenth century onwards. Plantations and parkland were laid out in the eighteenth-century and include a roughly level hilltop to the north of the house which may be the site of a large maze.	I	PGW(Gd)6(CON)	Gloddaeth (St. David's College)
Gwrych Castle	Llanddulas and Rhyd-y-Foel; SH9265077577; 53°17′02″N 3°36′37″W	1 February 2022	Park and garden The gardens consist of two enclosed pleasure gardens built at the same time as the castle (c. 1819-1822). The creation of the present park is probably contemporary with the castle, however the parkland area to the north and east of the castle has been remodelled for use as a golf course.	II*	PGW(Gd)58(CON)	a golf course, in the background is the top of a castellated mansion can be seen within the woodland
Gwydir	Trefriw; SH7936759653; 53°07′12″N 3°48′10″W	1 February 2022	Park and garden The deer park to the south of the gardens probably dates to the end of the sixteenth century. It is bounded on its eastern side by the B5106 road which passes through the gardens and pleasure grounds separating the park and a less formal area of the gardens from the house with its walled courtyard and terrace to the north.	I	PGW(Gd)4(CON)	a path through a knot garden with the manor house behind it
Hafodunos	Llangernyw; SH8568466338; 53°10′54″N 3°42′39″W	1 February 2022	Gardens The planting is mostly from the 1830s, when the Sandbach family bought the estate, through to the end of the nineteenth century. Henry Robertson Sandbach, who commissioned George Gilbert Scott to design the Victorian Gothic style mansion in the 1860s, is said to have sought advise on the planting from Joseph Dalton Hooker.	II	PGW(Gd)57(CON)	Hafodunos
Happy Valley	Llandudno; SH7809083030; 53°19′47″N 3°49′51″W	1 February 2022	Public park The park was established to commemorate the Golden Jubilee of Queen Victoria in 1887. There is a monument with a bronze bust of Queen Victoria in the north-east of the park and a Gorsedd circle of 1896 on the nearby lawn. Other features of the park include a terraced garden, a camera obscura and a colonnaded walkway.	II	PGW(Gd)1(CON)	The monument; a bust on a pedestal covered by a free-standing canopy, behind which is a lawn with Gorsedd stones
Haulfre Gardens	Llandudno; SH7740982530; 53°19′31″N 3°50′27″W	1 February 2022	Garden The terraced garden is on very steep slope with panoramic views of Llandudno and the Conwy Mountains. It was originally laid out in the 1870s by Henry Pochin and opened as a public garden in 1929.	II	PGW(Gd)11(CON)	Haulfre Gardens
Hendre House	Bro Garmon; SH8122558936; 53°06′51″N 3°46′29″W	1 February 2022	Park and gardens The house was built in c. 1815 and the surrounding gardens and park are thought to be contemporary with it. The walled garden at the north of the park probably dates to the mid-seventeenth century or earlier. It originally belonged to Plas Tirion, a late sixteenth-century house to the north-west of Hendre House.	II	PGW(Gd)63(CON)	Hendre House
Oakbank and Bulkeley Mill	Caerhun; SH7603471628; 53°13′37″N 3°51′26″W	1 February 2022	Woodland garden Oakbank was the home of gardener and writer A. T. Johnson. The gardens, located in a narrow site beside the Afon Roe, were developed and laid out between the 1920s and 1950s as the site expanded to include the land around the mill house.	II	PGW(Gd)13(CON)	
Plas Madoc	Llanddoged and Maenan; SH7946463320; 53°09′11″N 3°48′10″W	1 February 2022	County house garden The overall layout has changed little since the 1850s when an estate map shows the gardens which are centrally located in the park and surround the house (demolished in 1952). The kitchen garden, to the east of the site of the house, was laid out in the second half of the nineteenth century.	II	PGW(Gd)2(CON)	
Plas Uchaf, Llannefydd	Llannefydd; SH9665471622; 53°13′53″N 3°32′54″W	1 February 2022	Terraced garden The formal walled and terraced garden is attached to a seventeenth or early eighteenth-century manor house.	II	PGW(Gd)55(CON)	Plas Uchaf, Llannefydd
Plas-yn-Llan	Eglwysbach; SH8009570120; 53°12′52″N 3°47′45″W	1 February 2022	Country house garden The late seventeenth-century walled and terraced garden was probably created in c. 1684 when alterations were being made to the house.	II	PGW(Gd)51(CON)	
Voelas	Ysbyty Ifan; SH8483551536; 53°02′54″N 3°43′06″W	1 February 2022	Park and gardens The present house (built 1957–1961) is surrounded by a small wooded park mostly created in the 1860s. A triple-arched road bridge crosses the River Conwy which passes through the estate where it is joined by the Nant-y-coed which lies to the west of the house. The terraced walled garden is to the east of the house and pleasure garden.	II*	PGW(Gd)59(CON)	
Wern Isaf (Rosebriars)	Llanfairfechan; SH6853375132; 53°15′24″N 3°58′15″W	1 February 2022	Cottage garden Wern Isaf was the home of Herbert Luck North (1871-1941) who designed the Arts and Crafts house and its gardens in c. 1900.	II	PGW(Gd)9(CON)	

== See also ==
- List of scheduled monuments in Conwy County Borough
- Grade I listed buildings in Conwy County Borough
- Grade II* listed buildings in Conwy County Borough
