= Grade I listed buildings in Conwy County Borough =

Conwy County Borough shown within Wales

In the United Kingdom, the term listed building refers to a building or other structure officially designated as being of special architectural, historical, or cultural significance; Grade I structures are those considered to be "buildings of exceptional interest". Listing was begun by a provision in the Town and Country Planning Act 1947. Once listed, strict limitations are imposed on the modifications allowed to a building's structure or fittings. In Wales, the authority for listing under the Planning (Listed Buildings and Conservation Areas) Act 1990 rests with Cadw.

== Buildings ==
Name	Location Grid Ref. (Note: Sometimes known as OSGB36, the grid reference is based on the British national grid reference system used by the Ordnance Survey.) Geo-coordinates	Date Listed	Function	Notes	Reference Number	Image
St Nefydd and St Mary's Church	Llannefydd; SH9821070599; 53°13′22″N 3°31′34″W	30 January 1968	Church	Prominently located in the centre of the village within a raised and walled churchyard.	199	See more images
Kinmel Hall	Abergele; SH9810174922; 53°15′41″N 3°31′45″W	10 June 1970	Hall	Located on an elevated platform site, within extensive parkland, approximately 3 miles SE of Abergele. Access now by driveway off Primrose Hill, St George Village.	229	See more images
Llwyni Lodge at Kinmel Hall, also known as the Golden Lodge and Gate Lodge	Abergele; SH9804876187; 53°16′22″N 3°31′49″W	4 October 1973	Lodge	The lodge stands at the S end of the avenue leading to Kinmel Hall from the N margin of the main A55 Holyhead Road. Sign on gatepost says Golden Lodge.	242	See more images
Hafodunos	Llangernyw; SH8675367035; 53°11′18″N 3°41′47″W	2 April 1970	House	About 1km WSW of Llangernyw.	262	See more images
Gwydir Castle	Trefriw; SH7959561037; 53°07′58″N 3°48′04″W	17 March 1953	House	Located approximately 1km S of Llanrwst at right-angles with the B5106 (Gwydir Road).	3161	See more images
Gwydir Castle Terrace arch and associated garden walls	Trefriw; SH7958861065; 53°07′59″N 3°48′05″W	30 May 1996	Wall	Located at the NW end of the raised terrace at Gwydir Castle and giving access to the Dutch Garden.	16936	See more images
Maenan Hall	Llanddoged and Maenan; SH7942365037; 53°10′08″N 3°48′19″W	17 March 1953	Hall	Located on a rise approximately 200m E of the A 470, 1.2km NW of Llandogged village; accessed via a long metalled drive leading W off the main road.	3163	See more images
St Mary's Church	Caerhun; SH7768370397; 53°12′59″N 3°50′00″W	13 October 1966	Church	Situated on a rise overlooking the river Conwy on the W bank, and occupying the NE corner of the former Roman fort of Canovium; accessed via a metalled lane running E from the B5106 Betws-y-Coed to Conwy road.	3167	See more images
St Gwyddelan's Church	Dolwyddelan; SH7359252294; 53°03′11″N 3°53′15″W	13 October 1966	Church	In the centre of the village, set back slightly within a low rubble-walled churchyard and surrounded by mature trees.	3184	See more images
St Celynin's Old Church	Henryd; SH7511873726; 53°14′45″N 3°52′23″W	13 October 1966	Church	Located on a high plateau in the rocky uplands at the W extremity of the community, near the Cerrig-y-Ddinas hillfort and some 3km W of Henryd village.	3193	See more images
St Rhychwyn's Church	Llanrhychwyn; SH7747861610; 53°08′15″N 3°49′59″W	13 October 1966	Church	Situated on an upland plateau approximately 1.2km S of Trefriw and 0.3km E of Lake Geirionydd; set back slightly to the SE of the road between the two.	3211	See more images
Conwy town walls	Conwy; SH7806177694; 53°16′56″N 3°49′50″W	23 September 1950	Town wall	Enclosing the old town on the W side of the castle.	3233	See more images
Conwy Suspension Bridge	Conwy; SH7849777494; 53°16′50″N 3°49′26″W	23 September 1950	Bridge	Spanning Afon Conwy E of the castle and S of the modern road bridge (A547).	3234	See more images
Conwy Railway Bridge	Conwy; SH7849977467; 53°16′49″N 3°49′26″W	23 September 1950	Bridge	Spanning Afon Conwy on the E side of the castle and S of the modern road and suspension bridges.	3236	See more images
Conwy Castle	Conwy; SH7837677455; 53°16′48″N 3°49′32″W	23 September 1950	Castle	On the E side of the town overlooking the Conwy estuary.	3250	See more images
Aberconwy House	Conwy; SH781776; 53°16′54″N 3°49′43″W	23 September 1950	House	On the corner of Castle Street and High Street.	3262	See more images
St Benedict's Church	Conwy; SH7764076941; 53°16′31″N 3°50′11″W	23 September 1950	Church	In a walled churchyard near the main road junction in the village, and immediately S of Afon Gyffin.	3291	See more images
Bodysgallen Hall	Conwy; SH7995379275; 53°17′48″N 3°48′10″W	23 September 1950	Hall	A large 3-storey house with attic, converted to a hotel.	3334	See more images
St Mary's Church	Conwy; SH7816377526; 53°16′50″N 3°49′44″W	8 October 1981	Church	In a large churchyard enclosed by buildings to Castle Street, High Street, Church Street and Rose Hill Street.	3353	See more images
Gloddaeth Hall	Llandudno; SH8024680688; 53°18′34″N 3°47′56″W	10 January 1951	College	In extensive grounds between A470 (Wormhout Way) and Gloddaeth Lane. Now part of St David's College.	3411	See more images
Pont Fawr	Llanrwst; SH7984061485; 53°08′13″N 3°47′52″W	25 January 1951	Bridge	Spans Afon Conwy opposite Victoria Hotel.	3612	See more images
St Grwst's Church	Llanrwst; SH7974361616; 53°08′17″N 3°47′57″W	25 January 1951	Church	Beyond W end of Tan yr Eglwys, in churchyard overlooking Afon Conwy.	3622	See more images
Plas Mawr	Conwy; SH7808277600; 53°16′53″N 3°49′48″W	23 September 1950	House	On the corner of High Street and Crown Lane.	3634	See more images
Gwydir Uchaf Chapel	Trefriw; SH7948460933; 53°07′55″N 3°48′10″W	30 May 1996	Chapel	Strikingly located on an elevated plateau immediately above Gwydir Castle and NW of the Carreg-y-Gwalch; adjacent to Gwydir Uchaf.	16944	See more images
Waterloo Bridge	Bro Garmon; SH7986255733; 53°05′07″N 3°47′43″W	23 June 1967	Bridge	Spanning the Afon Conwy and carrying the A5 from Betws-y-Coed to Pentrefoelas.	121	See more images
Waterloo Bridge	Betws y Coed; SH7984555727; 53°05′07″N 3°47′44″W	30 May 1996	Bridge	Carrying the A5 at the SE approach to Betws-y-Coed, spanning the Afon Conwy.	17827	See more images
Dolwyddelan Castle	Dolwyddelan; SH7219452329; 53°03′10″N 3°54′30″W	17 February 1997	Castle	Strikingly located overlooking the modern road on a dramatic eminence 1.5km W of Dolwyddelan village.	18253	See more images

== See also ==
- Grade II* listed buildings in Conwy County Borough
- Listed buildings in Wales
- List of scheduled monuments in Conwy County Borough
- Registered historic parks and gardens in Conwy County Borough
