= List of scheduled monuments in Conwy County Borough =

Conwy County Borough is on the north coast of Wales, and has a heavily populated coastal strip. A third of the county is within the Snowdonia National Park. There are a total of 161 scheduled monuments in the county. 106 of these are Prehistoric, including at least six Neolithic sites. Like much of Wales, there are large numbers of Bronze Age sites, particularly burial mounds, and some 40 Iron Age sites including hillforts and hut groups. There are just three Roman sites, and six early medieval (Pre-Norman Conquest), all of which are early Christian monuments, including inscribed stones and a holy well. From the post-Norman medieval period, the castle and walls of Conwy itself are part of a World Heritage Site. There are numerous other fortified sites, along with lost villages, ruined chapels and a Bishop's palace amongst the 24 medieval sites. In the post-medieval period, there are two sites, including churches, bridges, lead mines and World War II defences. Conwy is made up of parts of the historic counties of Denbighshire and Caernarvonshire, which are covered respectively by the Clwyd-Powys Archaeological Trust (CPAT) and Gwyneth Archaeological Trust.

Scheduled monuments have statutory protection. It is illegal to disturb the ground surface or any standing remains. The compilation of the list of sites is undertaken by Cadw Welsh Historic Monuments, which is an executive agency of the National Assembly of Wales. The list of scheduled monuments below is supplied by Cadw with additional material from RCAHMW and Clwyd-Powys and Gwynedd Archaeological Trusts.

== Scheduled monuments in Conwy ==
| Image | Name | Site type | Community | Location | Details | Historic County | Period | SAM No & Refs |
|---|---|---|---|---|---|---|---|---|
| | Ogof Tan-y-Bryn | Cave | Llandudno | 53.3177°N 3.8037°W, SH799816 | | Caernarvonshire | Prehistoric (Palaeolithic) | CN204 |
| Capel Garmon Burial Chamber | Capel Garmon Burial Chamber | Chambered long cairn | Bro Garmon | 53.073°N 3.7658°W, SH817543 | | Denbighshire | Prehistoric (Neolithic) | DE001 |
| Maen y Bardd burial chamber | Maen y Bardd Burial Chamber | Chambered long cairn | Caerhun | 53.2281°N 3.888°W, SH740717 | A classic neolithic burial chamber, which translates as the bard's stone although it is also known as Cwt-y-Bugail (shepherd's hut) and Cwt-y-filiast (greyhound's kennel). It is beside a track near Rowen, Conwy, amongst numerous later prehistoric sites. | Caernarvonshire | Prehistoric (Neolithic) | CN027 |
| Limestones cliffs of the Great Orme | Kendricks Cave | Cave | Llandudno | 53.3283°N 3.8336°W, SH779828 | Two caves on the Great Orme. The lower was excavated in 1880 by Thomas Kendrick, who lived in the upper cave. Decorated animal bone, tooth necklaces and human remains were among the finds dating from the neolithic onwards. | Caernarvonshire | Prehistoric (Neolithic and after) | CN191 |
| Lletty'r Filiast, Burial Chamber | Llandudno Burial Chamber | Chambered long cairn | Llandudno | 53.3292°N 3.8452°W, SH772829 | Also known as Llety'r Filiast Chambered Tomb, this neolithic tomb is close to the Great Orme tramway | Caernarvonshire | Prehistoric | CN005 |
| | Ogof Pant-y-Wennol | Cave | Llandudno | 53.318°N 3.7906°W, SH808816 | Limestone cave with 6 neolithic burials, found encased in stalagmite. | Caernarvonshire | Prehistoric (Neolithic) | CN190 |
| | Round Barrow East of Corby | Round barrow | Betws yn Rhos | 53.2622°N 3.7272°W, SH848753 | | Denbighshire | Prehistoric | DE285 |
| | Maen-Pebyll Burial Chamber | Long cairn | Bro Garmon | 53.0944°N 3.7281°W, SH843566 | | Denbighshire | Prehistoric | DE004 |
| | Y Foel Cairns | Round cairn | Bro Machno | 53.0392°N 3.7886°W, SH801506 | | Caernarvonshire | Prehistoric | CN378 |
| | Afon Dulyn ring cairn | Ring cairn | Caerhun | 53.1888°N 3.8968°W, SH733674 | | Caernarvonshire | Prehistoric | CN357 |
| | Barclodiad-y-Gawres Round Cairn | Round cairn | Caerhun | 53.2259°N 3.9227°W, SH717716 | | Caernarvonshire | Prehistoric | CN131 |
| | Bwlch y Ddeufaen Standing Stones | Standing stone | Caerhun | 53.2278°N 3.927°W, SH714718 | | Caernarvonshire | Prehistoric | CN129 |
| | Cerrig Pryfaid Stone Circle | Stone circle | Caerhun | 53.2237°N 3.9119°W, SH724713 | | Caernarvonshire | Prehistoric | CN130 |
| | Ffrith Llwynhwfa Burial Cairn | Cairn | Caerhun | 53.2329°N 3.8843°W, SH743723 | | Caernarvonshire | Prehistoric | CN317 |
| | Afon Bedol cairn and standing stone | Round cairn | Capel Curig | 53.1286°N 3.9368°W, SH705607 | | Caernarvonshire | Prehistoric | CN360 |
| | Afon Bedol cist | Cist burial | Capel Curig | 53.1287°N 3.9353°W, SH706608 | | Caernarvonshire | Prehistoric | CN361 |
| | Afon Ystymiau, cairns to N of | Round cairn | Capel Curig | 53.0782°N 3.8888°W, SH735551 | | Caernarvonshire | Prehistoric | CN379 |
| | Bwlch Cowlyd cairn | Round cairn | Capel Curig | 53.1286°N 3.928°W, SH710607 | | Caernarvonshire | Prehistoric | CN362 |
| | Capel Curig cairn | Round cairn | Capel Curig | 53.1018°N 3.8954°W, SH731577 | | Caernarvonshire | Prehistoric | CN363 |
| | Carnedd Dafydd cairn | Round cairn | Capel Curig, (also Llanllechid), (see also Gwynedd) | 53.1477°N 4.0008°W, SH662630 | | Caernarvonshire | Prehistoric | CN367 |
| | Carnedd Dafydd, cairn to SW of | Round cairn | Capel Curig, (also Llanllechid), (see also Gwynedd) | 53.1466°N 4.0029°W, SH661629 | | Caernarvonshire | Prehistoric | CN368 |
| | Carnedd Fach cairn | Round cairn | Capel Curig, (also Llanllechid), (see also Gwynedd) | 53.1438°N 4.0079°W, SH657626 | | Caernarvonshire | Prehistoric | CN366 |
| | Carnedd Llewelyn cairn | Round cairn | Capel Curig, (also Llanllechid), (also Caerhun), (see also Gwynedd) | 53.1602°N 3.9703°W, SH683643 | | Caernarvonshire | Prehistoric | CN371 |
| | Dyffryn Mymbyr cairn circle | Cairn circle | Capel Curig | 53.0894°N 3.9639°W, SH685564 | | Caernarvonshire | Prehistoric | CN372 |
| | Nant y Benglog cairn | Round cairn | Capel Curig | 53.1224°N 3.9332°W, SH707601 | | Caernarvonshire | Prehistoric | CN370 |
| | Hafotty Wen Ring Cairn | Ring cairn | Cerrigydrudion | 53.0706°N 3.5297°W, SH976536 | | Denbighshire | Prehistoric | DE283 |
| | Ffrith-Uchaf Round Cairn | Round cairn | Conwy | 53.1248°N 3.7033°W, SH861599 | | Denbighshire | Prehistoric | DE118 |
| | Ring Cairn North-West of Llyn y Wrach | Ring cairn | Conwy | 53.2644°N 3.8811°W, SH746758 | | Caernarvonshire | Prehistoric | CN260 |
| | Cae Du platform cairn | Platform Cairn | Dolgarrog | 53.1779°N 3.8687°W, SH752661 | | Caernarvonshire | Prehistoric | CN365 |
| | Mwdwl Eithin Round Barrows | Round barrow | Eglwysbach | 53.1976°N 3.7548°W, SH828681 | | Denbighshire | Prehistoric | DE046 |
| | Cefn Llechen Cairns | Round cairn | Henryd | 53.2589°N 3.8856°W, SH743752 | | Caernarvonshire | Prehistoric | CN353 |
| | Cefn Llechen Stone Circle | Stone circle | Henryd | 53.26°N 3.8792°W, SH747753 | | Caernarvonshire | Prehistoric | CN124 |
| | Cefn Maen Amor cairn | Round cairn | Henryd | 53.2444°N 3.892°W, SH738735 | | Caernarvonshire | Prehistoric | CN354 |
| | Cefn Maen Amor stone circle | Stone circle | Henryd | 53.2443°N 3.8916°W, SH738735 | | Caernarvonshire | Prehistoric | CN355 |
| | Hafotty Standing Stone | Standing stone | Henryd | 53.2568°N 3.8784°W, SH747749 | | Caernarvonshire | Prehistoric | CN116 |
| | Maen Penddu | Standing stone | Henryd | 53.2442°N 3.8911°W, SH739735 | | Caernarvonshire | Prehistoric | CN126 |
| Great Orme Copper Mines | Great Orme Copper Mines | Copper mine | Llandudno | 53.331°N 3.8482°W, SH770831 | | Caernarvonshire | Prehistoric | CN216 |
| | Hwylfa'r Ceirw Stone Alignment | Stone alignment | Llandudno | 53.3393°N 3.8554°W, SH765840 | | Caernarvonshire | Prehistoric | CN132 |
| | Bryniau Bugeilydd cairns | Ring cairn | Llanfairfechan | 53.2478°N 3.9223°W, SH718740 | | Caernarvonshire | Prehistoric | CN352 |
| | Cerrig Gwynion cairn | Round cairn | Llanfairfechan | 53.2446°N 3.9158°W, SH722736 | | Caernarvonshire | Prehistoric | CN350 |
| | Foel Lwyd, cairn to N of | Round cairn | Llanfairfechan | 53.2416°N 3.9198°W, SH719733 | | Caernarvonshire | Prehistoric | CN349 |
| | Foel Lwyd, cairn to NW of | Round cairn | Llanfairfechan | 53.2361°N 3.9284°W, SH713727 | | Caernarvonshire | Prehistoric | CN348 |
| | Waun Llanfair barrow | Round barrow | Llanfairfechan | 53.2483°N 3.942°W, SH705741 | | Caernarvonshire | Prehistoric | CN351 |
| | Yr Orsedd, cairn to NNW of | Round cairn | Llanfairfechan | 53.2299°N 3.9625°W, SH690721 | | Caernarvonshire | Prehistoric | CN341 |
| | Mwdwl Eithin Round Cairn | Round cairn | Llanfihangel Glyn Myfyr | 53.0106°N 3.5075°W, SH989469 | | Denbighshire | Prehistoric | DE281 |
| | Moel Fodiar Tumuli | Round barrow | Llannefydd | 53.1992°N 3.5309°W, SH978680 | | Denbighshire | Prehistoric | DE282 |
| | Hendre-Waelod Burial Chamber | Chambered long cairn | Llansanffraid Glan Conwy | 53.256°N 3.811°W, SH792747 | Also known as Allor Moloch, this dolmen has a huge capstone, and is beside a footpath, overlooking the Conwy Estuary | Denbighshire | Prehistoric | DE125 |
| | Blaen y Cwm Round Barrow | Round barrow | Llansannan | 53.1347°N 3.5872°W, SH939609 | | Denbighshire | Prehistoric | DE124 |
| | Bryn-Nantllech Round Barrow | Round barrow | Llansannan | 53.2022°N 3.5906°W, SH938684 | | Denbighshire | Prehistoric | DE187 |
| | Bylchau Church Round Barrows | Round barrow | Llansannan | 53.1539°N 3.5326°W, SH976629 | | Denbighshire | Prehistoric | DE036 |
| | Plas-Newydd Round Barrow | Round barrow | Llansannan | 53.1846°N 3.5772°W, SH947664 | | Denbighshire | Prehistoric | DE101 |
| | Rhiwiau round barrow cemetery | Round barrow | Llansannan | 53.1324°N 3.5788°W, SH944606 | | Denbighshire | Prehistoric | DE100 |
| | Rhos y Domen Round Barrows | Round barrow | Llansannan | 53.1631°N 3.6468°W, SH900641 | | Denbighshire | Prehistoric | DE075 |
| | Round Barrow 828m W of Cae-du | Round barrow | Llansannan | 53.1548°N 3.6081°W, SH926632 | | Denbighshire | Prehistoric | DE172 |
| | Round Cairn 648m NE of Tan-y-Foel | Round cairn | Llansannan | 53.1458°N 3.6173°W, SH919621 | | Denbighshire | Prehistoric | DE157 |
| | Bryn Derwydd stone circle | Stone circle | Penmaenmawr | 53.2573°N 3.9018°W, SH732750 | | Caernarvonshire | Prehistoric | CN339 |
| | Maen Crwn standing stone | Standing stone | Penmaenmawr | 53.2567°N 3.9037°W, SH731749 | | Caernarvonshire | Prehistoric | CN340 |
| | Penmaenmawr Stone Circle | Stone circle | Penmaenmawr | 53.253°N 3.917°W, SH722746 | | Caernarvonshire | Prehistoric | CN024 |
| | Cefn-y-Gadfa Stone Rows and Cists | Cist burial | Pentrefoelas | 53.0675°N 3.6755°W, SH878535 | | Denbighshire | Prehistoric | DE094 |
| | Hafod-y-Dre Stone Rows and Cairn | Stone alignment | Pentrefoelas | 53.069°N 3.665°W, SH885537 | | Denbighshire | Prehistoric | DE095 |
| | Maes Merddyn Ring Cairn | Ring cairn | Pentrefoelas | 53.0767°N 3.7044°W, SH859546 | | Denbighshire | Prehistoric | DE273 |
| | Moel Rhiwlug Cist Cairn | Kerb cairn | Pentrefoelas | 53.0824°N 3.6696°W, SH882552 | | Denbighshire | Prehistoric | DE275 |
| | Nant Heilyn Stone Setting | Stone setting | Pentrefoelas | 53.0853°N 3.6086°W, SH923554 | | Denbighshire | Prehistoric | DE284 |
| | Round Cairn 500m SE of Moel Seisiog | Kerb cairn | Pentrefoelas | 53.0972°N 3.6978°W, SH864569 | | Denbighshire | Prehistoric | DE307 |
| | Cefn Cyfarwydd Cairn | Round cairn | Trefriw | 53.1477°N 3.867°W, SH752628 | | Caernarvonshire | Prehistoric | CN369 |
| | Hwlffordd Round Barrow | Round barrow | Ysbyty Ifan | 53.1747°N 3.5692°W, SH952653 | | Denbighshire | Prehistoric | DE197 |
| | Castell Cawr Hillfort | Hillfort | Abergele | 53.2772°N 3.5983°W, SH935767 | | Denbighshire | Prehistoric | DE114 |
| | Early Fields & Dwellings Nr Maen y Bardd | Enclosure | Caerhun | 53.2271°N 3.8921°W, SH737716 | | Caernarvonshire | Prehistoric | CN181 |
| | Early Fields and Dwellings near Maen-y-Bardd | Enclosure | Caerhun | 53.2301°N 3.8876°W, SH741720 | | Caernarvonshire | Prehistoric | CN157 |
| | Pant y Griafolen Huts and Enclosures | Unenclosed hut circle | Caerhun | 53.1817°N 3.9329°W, SH709667 | | Caernarvonshire | Prehistoric | CN145 |
| | Pen y Gaer Camp | Hillfort | Caerhun | 53.206°N 3.873°W, SH750693 | | Caernarvonshire | Prehistoric | CN023 |
| | Settlement, N of Cwm Eigiau | Enclosed hut circle | Caerhun | 53.1572°N 3.9302°W, SH710639 | | Caernarvonshire | Prehistoric | CN236 |
| | Hut Circle Settlement at Nant Bochllwyd | Hut circle settlement | Capel Curig | 53.1204°N 4.0063°W, SH658600 | | Caernarvonshire | Prehistoric | CN269 |
| | Huts and Enclosures SE of Glan Llugwy | Field system | Capel Curig | 53.1273°N 3.9563°W, SH692606 | | Caernarvonshire | Prehistoric | CN161 |
| | Bryn Teg Enclosure | Enclosed hut circle | Cerrigydrudion | 53.0237°N 3.5526°W, SH959485 | | Denbighshire | Prehistoric | DE229 |
| | Ffridd Brynhelen Enclosures & Fields | Enclosure | Cerrigydrudion | 53.0558°N 3.5418°W, SH967520 | | Denbighshire | Prehistoric | DE228 |
| | Castell Caer Leion | Hillfort | Conwy | 53.2826°N 3.8617°W, SH759777 | | Caernarvonshire | Prehistoric | CN012 |
| | Hut circles NW of Tyn-y-Ddol | Unenclosed hut circle | Dolwyddelan | 53.0484°N 3.9474°W, SH695519 | | Caernarvonshire | Prehistoric | CN251 |
| Site of Caer Bach | Caer Bach | Hillfort | Henryd | 53.2389°N 3.8831°W, SH744729 | Caer Bach is a Welsh hillfort of indeterminate age, situated on the eastern slopes of Tal-y-Fan mountain, near the village of Rowen; in Conwy County, North Wales. | Caernarvonshire | Prehistoric | CN125 |
| | Hut Circle Settlement at Gwern Engan | Hut circle settlement | Henryd | 53.2704°N 3.8681°W, SH755764 | | Caernarvonshire | Prehistoric | CN215 |
| | Hut Groups N of Cerrig y Dinas | Enclosed hut circle | Henryd | 53.2499°N 3.8699°W, SH753741 | | Caernarvonshire | Prehistoric | CN127 |
| | Round Hut 70m S of St Celynin's Church | Hut circle settlement | Henryd | 53.2452°N 3.8731°W, SH751736 | | Caernarvonshire | Prehistoric | CN128 |
| | Caer Oleu Camp | Hillfort | Llanddoged and Maenan | 53.1819°N 3.8076°W, SH793665 | | Caernarvonshire | Prehistoric | CN041 |
| | Pen-y-Corddyn Camp | Hillfort | Llanddulas and Rhyd-y-Foel | 53.2734°N 3.6285°W, SH915764 | | Denbighshire | Prehistoric | DE008 |
| | Coed Gaer Hut Circle | Unenclosed hut circle | Llandudno | 53.3116°N 3.8024°W, SH800809 | | Caernarvonshire | Prehistoric | CN257 |
| | Hut Circle, Bryniau Poethion, Great Orme | Unenclosed hut circle | Llandudno | 53.3328°N 3.8496°W, SH769833 | | Caernarvonshire | Prehistoric | CN234 |
| | Hut Circle, Hafnant, Great Orme | Unenclosed hut circle | Llandudno | 53.3393°N 3.8579°W, SH763840 | | Caernarvonshire | Prehistoric | CN235 |
| | Pen y Dinas Camp | Hillfort | Llandudno | 53.3296°N 3.8348°W, SH779829 | | Caernarvonshire | Prehistoric | CN039 |
| | Dinas Camp | Hillfort | Llanfairfechan | 53.2456°N 3.9493°W, SH700738 | | Caernarvonshire | Prehistoric | CN049 |
| | Garreg Fawr Hut Groups, Ancient Fields and Cairns | Enclosed hut circle | Llanfairfechan | 53.2417°N 3.9714°W, SH685734 | | Caernarvonshire | Prehistoric | CN185 |
| | Gwern y Plas Ancient Village | Unenclosed hut circle | Llanfairfechan | 53.2541°N 3.9698°W, SH686748 | | Caernarvonshire | Prehistoric | CN072 |
| | Hut Circles near Wern Newydd | Unenclosed hut circle | Llanfairfechan | 53.2474°N 3.9899°W, SH673741 | | Caernarvonshire | Prehistoric | CN250 |
| | Hut Circles West of Foel Llwyd | Unenclosed hut circle | Llanfairfechan | 53.233°N 3.9289°W, SH713724 | | Caernarvonshire | Prehistoric | CN306 |
| | Pont y Teiryd Hut Group and Ancient Fields | Enclosed hut circle | Llanfairfechan | 53.2429°N 3.9566°W, SH695735 | | Caernarvonshire | Prehistoric | CN184 |
| | Cae Ddunod Camp | Hillfort | Llanfihangel Glyn Myfyr | 53.0556°N 3.5143°W, SH986520 | | Denbighshire | Prehistoric | DE076 |
| | Cefn Banog Ancient Village | Hut circle settlement | Llanfihangel Glyn Myfyr | 53.0474°N 3.4656°W, SJ018510 | | Denbighshire | Prehistoric | DE029 |
| | Pen-y-Gaer Camp (Caer Caradog) | Hillfort | Llanfihangel Glyn Myfyr | 53.0186°N 3.5395°W, SH968479 | | Denbighshire | Prehistoric | DE011 |
| | Tyddyn Tudur Enclosure | Enclosure - Domestic | Llanfihangel Glyn Myfyr | 53.0338°N 3.529°W, SH975495 | | Denbighshire | Prehistoric | DE253 |
| | Pant-y-Rhedyn Earthwork | Enclosure | Llangernyw | 53.1814°N 3.7339°W, SH842663 | | Denbighshire | Prehistoric | DE078 |
| | Mynydd y Gaer Camp | Hillfort | Llannefydd | 53.2332°N 3.5404°W, SH972717 | | Denbighshire | Prehistoric | DE082 |
| | Gwern Engan Concentric Enclosed Hut Circle | Hut circle settlement | Penmaenmawr | 53.2734°N 3.8711°W, SH753767 | | Caernarvonshire | Prehistoric | CN299 |
| | Hut Circles at Clip yr Orsedd | Hut circle settlement | Penmaenmawr | 53.2563°N 3.9345°W, SH710750 | | Caernarvonshire | Prehistoric | CN283 |
| | Maes-Gwyn Castle Mound | Mound | Pentrefoelas | 53.0568°N 3.6973°W, SH863524 | | Denbighshire | Prehistoric | DE128 |
| | Bryn Euryn Camp | Hillfort | Rhos-on-Sea | 53.3021°N 3.7544°W, SH831797 | | Denbighshire | Prehistoric | DE071 |
| | Hut Settlement West of Allt Goch | Unenclosed hut circle | Trefriw | 53.1407°N 3.8803°W, SH743620 | | Caernarvonshire | Prehistoric | CN291 |
| | Hut group SSW of Cefngarw, Ysbyty | Hut circle settlement | Ysbyty Ifan | 52.9574°N 3.8033°W, SH789415 | | Caernarvonshire | Prehistoric | CN242 |
| | Kanovium Roman Site | Fort | Caerhun | 53.217°N 3.833°W, SH777704 | | Caernarvonshire | Roman | CN001 |
| site of Caer Llugwy Roman Fort | Caer Llugwy (Bryn-y-Gefeiliau Roman Fort) | Fort | Capel Curig | 53.0972°N 3.8743°W, SH746572 | Roman Fort of nearly 4 acres (1.6 ha) alongside the River Llugwy. A 1923 excavation named it after the river. More recent reports have used the name of the nearby farm. It is not known what the Roman's called it. | Caernarvonshire | Roman | CN010 |
| | Roman Road N of Llannerch Fedw | Road | Llanfairfechan | 53.2294°N 3.9386°W, SH706720 | | Caernarvonshire | Roman | CN402 |
| | St George's Well, Abergele | Holy Well | Abergele | 53.2681°N 3.5362°W, SH976756 | | Denbighshire | Early Medieval | DE186 |
| | Six Inscribed Stones in St Tudclud's Church, Penmachno | Inscribed stone | Bro Machno | 53.0388°N 3.8061°W, SH789506 | | Caernarvonshire | Early Medieval | CN182 |
| | Group of Four Inscribed Stones in Gwytherin Churchyard | Inscribed stone | Llangernyw | 53.1385°N 3.6806°W, SH876614 | | Denbighshire | Early Medieval | DE150 |
| | Two Cross-Incised Stones in St Digain's Churchyard, Llangernyw | Cross-marked stone | Llangernyw | 53.1921°N 3.6852°W, SH875674 | | Denbighshire | Early Medieval | DE161 |
| | Brohomalgi Stone (Now In Veolas Hall) | Inscribed stone | Pentrefoelas | 53.0485°N 3.7166°W, SH850515 | | Denbighshire | Early Medieval | DE096 |
| | Dol Tre Beddau: Site of Discovery of Brohomaglus Stone | Inscribed stone | Pentrefoelas | 53.0465°N 3.7037°W, SH858512 | | Denbighshire | Early Medieval | DE239 |
| | The Mount, Abergele | Mound | Abergele | 53.2852°N 3.58°W, SH947776 | | Denbighshire | Medieval | DE031 |
| | Pont y Pair | Bridge | Betws-y-Coed | 53.0939°N 3.806°W, SH791567 | | Caernarvonshire | Medieval | CN032 |
| | Maen Sertan Boundary Stones | Boundary stone | Bro Garmon | 53.0832°N 3.7318°W, SH841554 | | Denbighshire | Medieval | DE093 |
| | Bryn Castell | Motte | Caerhun | 53.2303°N 3.8211°W, SH785719 | | Caernarvonshire | Medieval | CN092 |
| | Clogwyn yr Eryr Deserted Rural Settlement | Rectangular hut | Caerhun | 53.1811°N 3.9112°W, SH723665 | | Caernarvonshire | Medieval | CN319 |
| | Hafod y Garreg Deserted Rural Settlement | Rectangular hut | Caerhun | 53.1876°N 3.8948°W, SH734672 | | Caernarvonshire | Medieval | CN320 |
| | Ty'n y Ddol Medieval Long Hut | Platform house | Capel Curig | 53.0441°N 3.9393°W, SH700514 | | Caernarvonshire | Medieval | CN304 |
| Conwy Castle | Conwy Castle | Castle | Conwy | 53.2801°N 3.8256°W, SH783774 | | Caernarvonshire | Medieval | CN004 |
| South-western section of Conwy Town Wall | Conwy Town Walls | Town Wall | Conwy | 53.2817°N 3.8312°W, SH780776 | | Caernarvonshire | Medieval | CN014 |
| Castell Deganwy Castle | Deganwy Castle | Castle | Conwy | 53.2978°N 3.8285°W, SH782794 | | Caernarvonshire | Medieval | CN016 |
| | Site of Medieval King's Hall and Wardrobe, Rosehill Street | Building (Unclassified) | Conwy | 53.2801°N 3.8282°W, SH782774 | | Caernarvonshire | Medieval | CN147 |
| Dolwyddelan Castle | Dolwyddelan Castle | Castle | Dolwyddelan | 53.0531°N 3.9084°W, SH721523 | | Caernarvonshire | Medieval | CN040 |
| | Tomen y Castell | Motte | Dolwyddelan | 53.0515°N 3.9039°W, SH724521 | | Caernarvonshire | Medieval | CN196 |
| Maenan Abbey Hotel on the Abbey site | Site of Aberconwy Abbey, Maenan | Abbey | Llanddoged and Maenan | 53.1744°N 3.8123°W, SH789656 | | Caernarvonshire | Medieval | CN082 |
| Remains of Bishop's Palace | Gogarth Grange | Bishop's Palace | Llandudno | 53.3285°N 3.8624°W, SH760829 | | Caernarvonshire | Medieval | CN093 |
| | Cae'r Haidd Deserted Rural Settlement | Platform house | Llanfairfechan | 53.239°N 3.9783°W, SH680732 | | Caernarvonshire | Medieval | CN330 |
| | Hendre-Isaf Castle Mound | Motte | Llangernyw | 53.2045°N 3.687°W, SH874688 | | Denbighshire | Medieval | DE077 |
| | St. Gwenfrewi's Chapel, Gwytherin | Chapel | Llangernyw | 53.138°N 3.6806°W, SH877614 | | Denbighshire | Medieval | DE240 |
| | Maesmor Hall Castle Mound | Motte | Llangwm | 52.9895°N 3.4719°W, SJ012445 | | Denbighshire | Medieval | DE149 |
| | Nant y Foel Long Hut | Deserted Rural Settlement | Pentrefoelas | 53.0839°N 3.6804°W, SH875553 | | Denbighshire | Post Medieval/Modern | DE298 |
| | Y Foelas Castle Mound | Motte & Bailey | Pentrefoelas | 53.0554°N 3.6872°W, SH870522 | | Denbighshire | Medieval | DE097 |
| | Llys Euryn Medieval House, Llandrillo-yn-Rhos | House (domestic) | Rhos-on-Sea | 53.3061°N 3.7529°W, SH832802 | | Denbighshire | Medieval | DE146 |
| | Tyddyn Wilym Deserted Rural Settlement | Deserted Rural Settlement | Trefriw | 53.1722°N 3.8412°W, SH770654 | | Caernarvonshire | Medieval | CN328 |
| | Ffridd-y-Fedw Platform House | Platform house | Ysbyty Ifan | 52.9899°N 3.7508°W, SH825450 | | Caernarvonshire | Medieval | CN305 |
| | Afon Llugwy Lead Mill | Mill | Betws-y-Coed | 53.1017°N 3.8356°W, SH772576 | | Caernarvonshire | Post-Medieval/Modern | CN331 |
| | Coed Mawr Pool Lead Mine | Lead mine | Betws-y-Coed | 53.1091°N 3.8224°W, SH781584 | | Caernarvonshire | Post-Medieval/Modern | CN332 |
| | Hafodlas Slate Quarry Mills and Associated Features | Incline Drumhouse | Betws-y-Coed | 53.0889°N 3.8239°W, SH779561 | | Caernarvonshire | Post-Medieval/Modern | CN295 |
| | Pont Rhyd-Llanfair | Bridge | Bro Garmon | 53.0563°N 3.7503°W, SH827524 | | Caernarvonshire | Post-Medieval/Modern | CN033 |
| | Barn N of Pen-y-Bryn | Barn | Bro Machno | 53.0363°N 3.8105°W, SH786503 | | Caernarvonshire | Post-Medieval/Modern | CN139 |
| The Rhiw Fachno Quarry | Cwm Penmachno Slate Quarry | Incline | Bro Machno | 53.0048°N 3.8625°W, SH751468 | | Caernarvonshire | Post-Medieval/Modern | CN333 |
| | Fedw-Deg Old House | House (domestic) | Bro Machno | 53.063°N 3.8085°W, SH789532 | | Caernarvonshire | Post-Medieval/Modern | CN099 |
| Roman Bridge, Pont Rhyd-y-Gynnen over the River Machno | Roman Bridge Penmachno | Bridge | Bro Machno | 53.0602°N 3.782°W, SH806529 | Although known as 'Roman Bridge', its age is uncertain but likely to be from the 16th or 17th century. Now in a ruined state. | Caernarvonshire | Post-Medieval/Modern | CN189 |
| Ruined watch-tower, Bryniau | Bryniau Tower | Tower | Conwy | 53.3057°N 3.824°W, SH785803 | | Caernarvonshire | Post-Medieval/Modern | CN201 |
| Central tower of Plas Mawr | Plas Mawr | House (domestic) | Conwy | 53.2812°N 3.83°W, SH780775 | | Caernarvonshire | Post-Medieval/Modern | CN083 |
| | Chapel at Penrhyn Old Hall | Chapel | Llandudno | 53.3181°N 3.7785°W, SH816816 | | Caernarvonshire | Post-Medieval/Modern | CN074 |
| | The Holyhead Road: Ty Nant section | Road | Llangwm | 52.9868°N 3.5005°W, SH993443 | | Denbighshire | Post-Medieval/Modern | DE287 |
| Pont Fawr, Llanrwst | Llanrwst Bridge | Bridge | Llanrwst | 53.137°N 3.7975°W, SH798614 | Known as Pont Fawr, the elegant three-arched bridge is dated 1636, and reputedly designed by Inigo Jones. | Denbighshire | Post-Medieval/Modern | DE025 |
| Pont Newydd bridge over the Merddwr | Pont Newydd (Northern) | Bridge | Pentrefoelas | 53.0468°N 3.6997°W, SH861512 | | Denbighshire | Post-Medieval/Modern | DE098 |
| | Ffridd Uchaf Deserted Rural Settlement | Deserted Rural Settlement | Trefriw | 53.1674°N 3.8426°W, SH769649 | | Caernarvonshire | Post-Medieval/Modern | CN329 |
| Gwydir Uchaf Chapel | Gwydir Uchaf Chapel | Chapel | Trefriw | 53.1319°N 3.8028°W, SH794609 | | Caernarvonshire | Post-Medieval/Modern | CN113 |
| | Hafna Lead Mine Mill | Lead mine | Trefriw | 53.1242°N 3.8236°W, SH780601 | | Caernarvonshire | Post-Medieval/Modern | CN326 |
| | Klondyke Lead Mill | Lead mine | Trefriw | 53.1424°N 3.8478°W, SH764621 | | Caernarvonshire | Post-Medieval/Modern | CN159 |
| | Vale of Conwy Lead Mine | Lead mine | Trefriw | 53.1219°N 3.8245°W, SH780598 | | Caernarvonshire | Post-Medieval/Modern | CN327 |
| Pont Newydd bridge over the Merddwr | Pont Newydd (Southern) | Bridge | Ysbyty Ifan | 53.0464°N 3.6995°W, SH861512 | | Denbighshire | Post-Medieval/Modern | DE099 |
| | Former Royal Artillery Coast Artillery School | Training Camp | Llandudno | 53.3327°N 3.8758°W, SH751833 | | Caernarvonshire | Post-Medieval/Modern | CN409 |
| | Nant Ffrancon Anti-invasion Defences | Anti-invasion defence site | Capel Curig, (also Llandygai), (see also Gwynedd) | 53.1252°N 4.0222°W, SH647605 | | Caernarvonshire | Post-Medieval/Modern | CN399 |

Scheduled monuments in Conwy, Wales.
=Prehistoric =Roman =Early Medieval
=Medieval =Post-Medieval/Modern

.

== See also ==
- List of Cadw properties
- List of castles in Wales
- List of hill forts in Wales
- Historic houses in Wales
- List of monastic houses in Wales
- List of museums in Wales
- List of Roman villas in Wales
