= Hiraethog Rural District =

Rural district in Denbighshire, Wales, from 1935 to 1974

Coordinates: 53.069°N 3.439°W

Hiraethog
- Area
  - 1935: 93,142 acres (376.93 km^{2})
  - 1961: 93,142 acres (376.93 km^{2})
- Population
  - 1931: 6,061
  - 1971: 4,180
- History
  - Created: 1935
  - Abolished: 1974
  - Succeeded by: Colwyn
- Status: Rural District
  - HQ: Llanrwst

Hiraethog was a rural district of the administrative county of Denbighshire, Wales, from 1935 to 1974. The district took its name from the historic district of Mynydd Hiraethog.

The district was created by a county review order on 1 April 1935 from the amalgamation of Uwchaled Rural District with most of Llanrwst Rural District and part of Ruthin Rural District. The headquarters of the rural district council were in Llanrwst, which was a separate urban district.

The district contained the following civil parishes:

- Cerrigydrudion
- Eglwysbach
- Gwytherin
- Llanddoged
- Llanfihangel Glyn Myfyr
- Llangernyw
- Llangwm
- Llanrwst Rural
- Pentrefoelas
- Tir Ifan

The rural district was abolished in 1974 by the Local Government Act 1972, when some parishes became part of the district of Colwyn in the county of Clwyd. The remainder, Eglwysbach, Llanddoged, Llanrwst Rural and Tir Ifan, became part of the Borough of Aberconwy in the County of Gwynedd.
