= Llanrwst Rural District =

Abolished Welsh rural district

Llanrwst
- Area
  - 1901: 59,284 acres (239.91 km^{2})
  - 1931: 59,287 acres (239.93 km^{2})
- Population
  - 1901: 4,591
  - 1931: 4,117
- History
  - Created: 1894
  - Abolished: 1935
  - Succeeded by: Hiraethog Rural District
- Status: Rural District
  - HQ: Llanrwst

Llanrwst was a rural district in the administrative county of Denbighshire from 1894 to 1935.

The rural district was formed from the part of Llanrwst Rural Sanitary District in Denbighshire. The remainder of the sanitary district, in Caernarfonshire, becoming Geirionydd Rural District.

The district contained nine civil parishes:

- Eglwysbach
- Gwernhywel
- Gwytherin
- Llanddoged
- Llangernyw
- Llanrwst: in 1897 part of this parish became Llanrwst Urban District, the remainder became Llanrwst Rural
- Pentrefoelas
- Prys
- Tir Ifan

Llanrwst Rural District was abolished by a County Review Order in 1935, becoming part of the new Hiraethog Rural District.

== Sources ==
Denbighshire Administrative County (Vision of Britain)
