= Colwyn (district) =

Former district of Clwyd, Wales

Coordinates: 53.17°N 3.58°W

- Borough
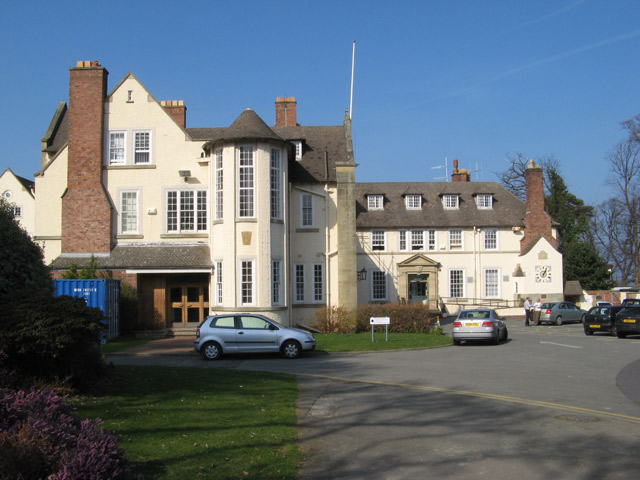
- Civic Centre, Colwyn Bay

- Area
  - 1974: 136,566.2 acres (552.664 km^{2})
- Population
  - 1973: 45,990
- History
  - Created: 1 April 1974
  - Abolished: 31 March 1996
  - Succeeded by: Conwy County Borough; Denbighshire
  - HQ: Colwyn Bay
- Contained within
  - County Council: Clwyd

Colwyn was a local government district with borough status from 1974 to 1996, being one of six districts in the county of Clwyd, north-east Wales.

== History ==
The borough was created on 1 April 1974, under the Local Government Act 1972. It covered parts of four former districts from the administrative county of Denbighshire, which were all abolished at the same time:

- Abergele Urban District
- Aled Rural District, except the parish of Llansantffraid Glan Conway, which went to Aberconwy
- Colwyn Bay Municipal Borough
- Hiraethog Rural District, except the parishes of Eglwysbach, Llanddoget, Llanrwst Rural, and Tir Ifan, which went to Aberconwy

The new borough was named Colwyn, taken from the name of the area's largest town, Colwyn Bay.

Under the Local Government (Wales) Act 1994, Clwyd County Council and the county's constituent districts were abolished, being replaced by principal areas, whose councils perform the functions which had previously been divided between the county and district councils. With effect from 1 April 1996, the two communities of Cefnmeiriadog and Trefnant were transferred from Colwyn to the new county of Denbighshire, and the remainder of Colwyn was merged with the neighbouring district of Aberconwy from Gwynedd to become a county borough which the government originally named "Aberconwy and Colwyn". During the transition to the new system, the shadow authority requested a change of name from "Aberconwy and Colwyn" to "Conwy". The government confirmed the change with effect from 2 April 1996, one day after the new council came into being.

The borough of Colwyn was twinned with Konstanz, Germany and Roissy-en-Brie, France.

The name Colwyn is currently used for an electoral ward covering the eastern part of the community of Old Colwyn. The ward had a population of 4,566 at the 2011 census.

== Political control ==
The first election to the council was held in 1973, initially operating as a shadow authority alongside the outgoing authorities until it came into its powers on 1 April 1974. Political control of the council from 1974 until its abolition in 1996 was as follows:

| Party in control | Years |
|---|---|
| Independent | 1974–1976 |
| No overall control | 1976–1996 |

== Premises ==
The council was based at the Civic Centre on Abergele Road in Colwyn Bay. The building had been built in 1909 as a hospital called Glan y Don Hall, but had been converted to a civic centre in 1964 for one of Colwyn's predecessor authorities, the Colwyn Bay Borough Council. Following the abolition of Colwyn in 1996 the building served as the headquarters of the successor Conwy County Borough Council until 2018.

== See also ==
- African Training Institute
