= Hiraethog =

Hiraethog may refer to:

- Gruffudd Hiraethog (died 1564), Welsh language poet
- Hiraethog Rural District, rural district in Denbighshire, Wales, from 1935 to 1974
- Mynydd Hiraethog, upland region in Conwy and Denbighshire in north-east Wales
- William Rees (Gwilym Hiraethog) (1802–1883), Welsh poet and author
