= Uwchaled Rural District =

Abolished Welsh rural district

Coordinates: 53.018°N 3.513°W

Uwchaled
- Area
  - 1901: 30,204 acres (122.23 km^{2})
  - 1931: 30,204 acres (122.23 km^{2})
- Population
  - 1901: 2,232
  - 1931: 1,968
- History
  - Created: 1894
  - Abolished: 1935
  - Succeeded by: Hiraethog Rural District
- Status: Rural District

Uwchaled (from Uwch Aled) was a rural district in the administrative county of Denbighshire, Wales, from 1894 to 1935. The name denoted the upper reaches of the River Aled, and originated in the medieval cwmwd (commote) of Uwch Aled. The rural district was created by the Local Government Act 1894, and comprised the part of the existing Corwen Rural Sanitary District in Denbighshire.

The district consisted of three civil parishes:

- Cerrigydrudion
- Llanfihangel Glyn Myfyr
- Llangwm

The district was abolished by a county review order in 1935, forming part of a new Hiraethog Rural District.
