= Groes, Conwy =

Village in Conwy County Borough, Wales

Coordinates: 53.1705°N 3.4862°W

Groes
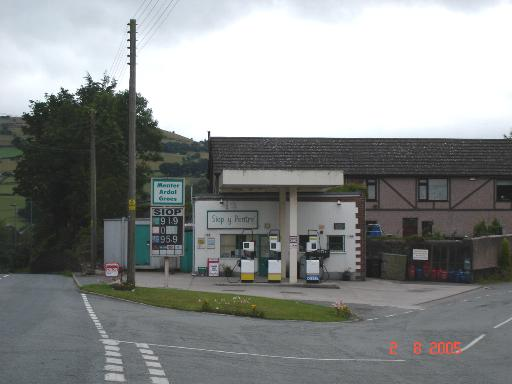
- Siop y Pentre

- Location within Conwy
- Community: Llansannan
- Principal area: Conwy
- Country: Wales
- Sovereign state: United Kingdom
- Police: North Wales
- Fire: North Wales
- Ambulance: Welsh
- UK Parliament: Bangor Aberconwy
- Senedd Cymru – Welsh Parliament: Clwyd West

Groes or Y Groes is a village in Conwy County Borough, Wales. It is in the community of Llansannan.

It was the location of Y Groes Welsh Calvinistic Methodist Chapel in the parish of Llansannan.

Groes Football Club was formed in 1992 to play in the Llandyrnog & District Summer League, but did not have its own pitch, initially playing at Denbigh Mental Hospital and then at Denbigh Rugby Club. In 1998 the club applied to use the pitch at Lower Park in Denbigh, and it was forced to rename to Nantglyn due to Groes being in Conwy County Borough instead of Denbighshire. The club now plays at a pitch in Nantglyn.
