= The Pin Mill =

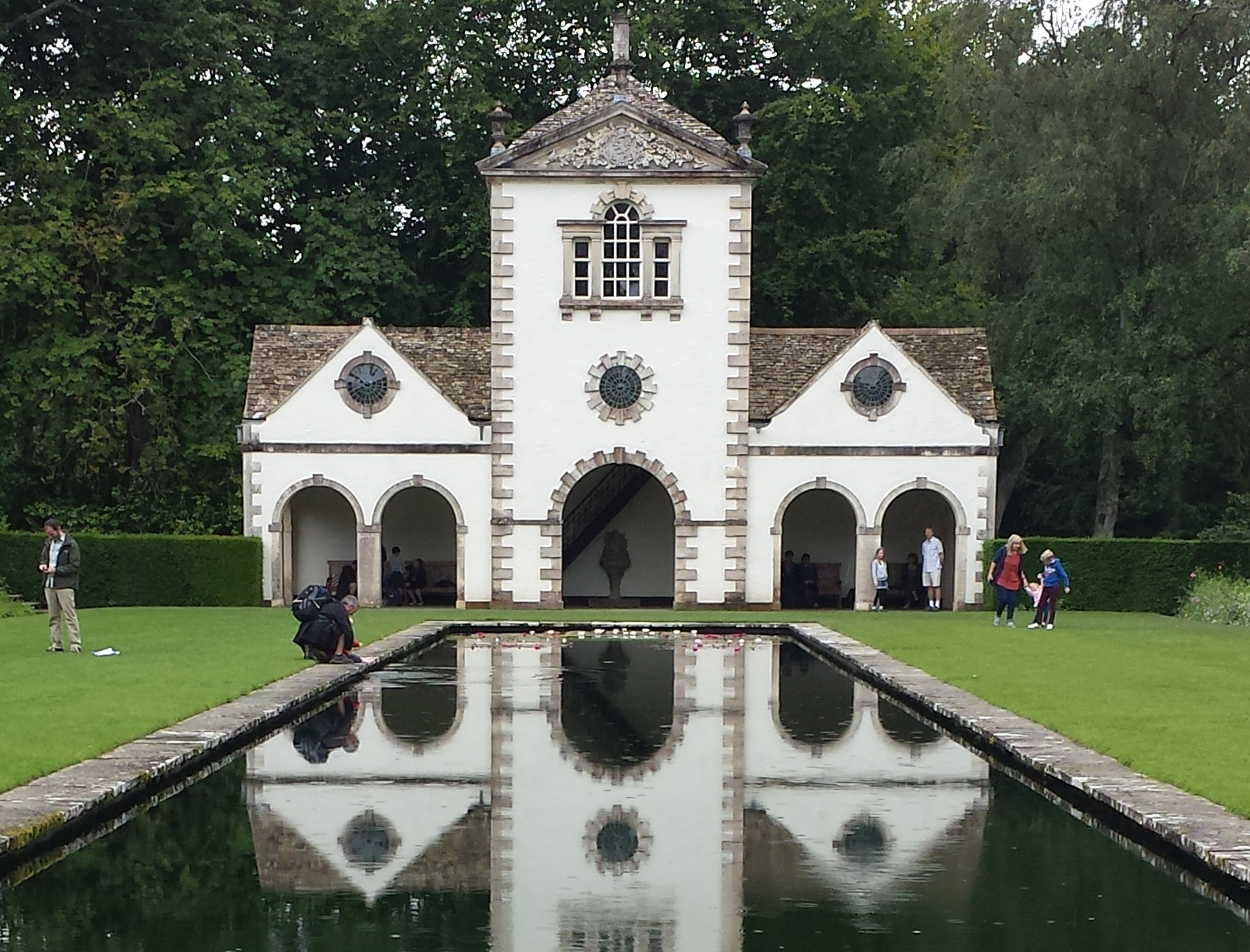

- Location within Conwy
- 53.2337°N 3.8012°W
- Type: House
- Location: Conwy, Wales
- OS grid reference: SH 7987 7225

History
- Built: early 18th century

Listed Building – Grade II*
- Official name: The Pin Mill
- Designated: 31 January 1952
- Reference no.: 65
- Community: Eglwysbach

The Pin Mill at Bodnant Garden in Conwy, Wales, was originally built as a lodge or garden house around 1730 at Woodchester, Gloucestershire. The building was later used as a pin factory and later still as a hide store for a tannery. Henry McLaren, 2nd Baron Aberconway purchased the Pin Mill when it was derelict and arranged for it to be dismantled, transported and reassembled at Bodnant in 1938–39. The architect J. Murray Easton made some repairs and sensitive alterations.

The Pin Mill was designated a Grade II*-listed building in 1952 as a fine example of an early Georgian garden building.

The storeyed central tower has a pyramidal roof and is symmetrically flanked by two lower pavilions.
