= Bylchau =

Hamlet in Conwy County Borough, Wales

Coordinates: 53.154°N 3.532°W

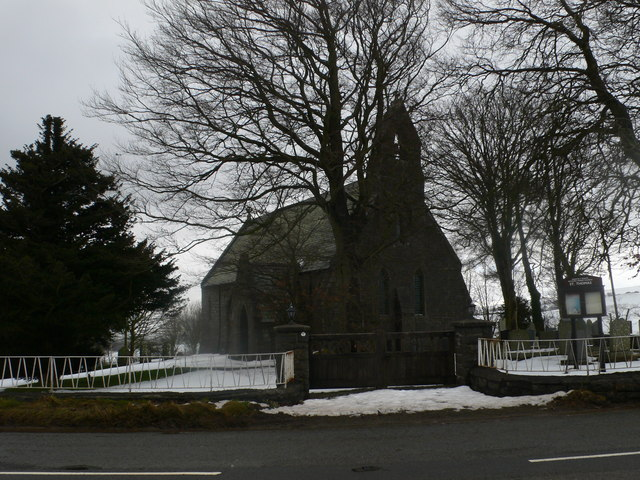
- St Thomas's Church, Bylchau

- Location within Conwy
- OS grid reference: SH976629
- Community: Llansannan
- Principal area: Conwy
- Country: Wales
- Sovereign state: United Kingdom
- Post town: DENBIGH
- Postcode district: LL16
- Dialling code: 01745
- Police: North Wales
- Fire: North Wales
- Ambulance: Welsh
- UK Parliament: Bangor Aberconwy
- Senedd Cymru – Welsh Parliament: Clwyd West

Bylchau (Welsh pronunciation) is a hamlet in Conwy County Borough, Wales. It is located at the junction of the A544 with the A543, some 5 miles to the south-west of Denbigh, and just a mile from the county border with Denbighshire.

The village has a church, which was consecrated on 27 October 1857, and dedicated to St Thomas.

Together with the village of Llansannan, the residents of Bylchau elect community councillors to represent them on Llansannan Community Council.
