= Edward Parry (Methodist preacher) =

Welsh preacher, poet, and hymn-writer (1723-1786)

- Born: Llansannan
- Died: 16 September 1786; Llansannan

Edward Parry (1723 – 16 September 1786) was a prominent Methodist preacher, hymn writer, and poet in North Wales during the 18th century.

== Biography ==
Parry was born in 1723 at Llys Bychan, Llansannan, Denbighshire. He was carpenter by trade, and was contemporary with Thomas Edwards (Twm o'r Nant).

In 1747 he invited the revivalists into his home and in 1749 he started preaching himself, but returned to the established church following the split between Howel Harris and Daniel Rowland. In 1761 he left his home at Tan-y-fron and went to live at Brynbugad, where he rejoined the Methodists. When the South Wales preachers visited to North Wales, Edward Parry was again inspired and gained in popularity as a powerful preacher. As a result, he was invited to preach in the London chapels.

In 1773 he built a chapel on his land at Tan-y-fron and the following year worked with Twm o'r Nant and David James of Llansannan to publish a series of hymns and psalms.

Parry died aged 63 and was buried in Llansannan churchyard.

== Bibliography ==
- Goleuad Cymru (Caerleon 1820–1830), 1827, pages 446, 464, 490, 516, 558
- Methodistiaeth Cymru (1851–1856), pages i, 143–6, iii, 113-25
- Enwogion y Ffydd, 1880
- Emynau a'u Hawduriaid by J. Thickens, 1945
- Methodistiaeth Galfinaidd Dinbych 1735–1909 by E. P. Jones, 1936, page 24
