= African Training Institute =

Educational institution (1889–1912)

The African Training Institute was a religious Christian institution set up to educate children in Africa. It was established in Colwyn, Wales by the Reverend William Hughes under the name Congo Training Institute (or Congo House) in 1889 to educate children of the Congo. Leopold II, the king of Belgium, was the sponsor of the institution. The institute also attracted pupils from Cameroon, Nigeria, Sierra Leone, Liberia, and the United States. The pupils also received training in handicrafts. In 1912 William Hughes faced bankruptcy after he lost a libel case, and as a result the institution closed.
