= Prys =

Prys is a surname or a given name. Notable people with this name include:

== Surname ==
- Cedric Prys-Roberts, British anaesthetist
- Edmund Prys (1542–1623), Welsh clergyman and poet
- Gwilym Prys Davies, Baron Prys-Davies (1923–2017), Welsh politician
- Owen Prys (1857–1934), Welsh Calvinist minister
- Prys Morgan (born 1937), Welsh historian

== Given name ==
- Tomos Prys (c.1564–1634), Welsh soldier

== See also ==
- Rhys#The patronymic form
