= Church of St Nefydd and St Mary, Llannefydd =

Church in Conwy County Borough, Wales

Coordinates: 53.2227°N 3.5261°W

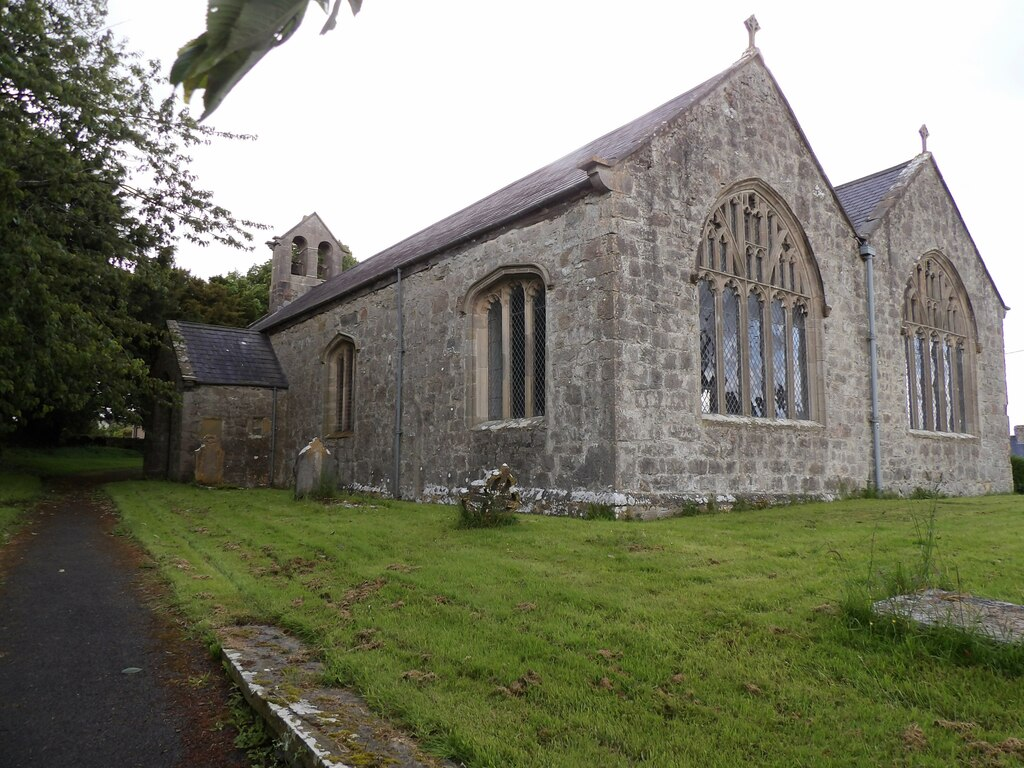

- Location in Conwy County Borough
- OS grid reference: SH 982 705
- Location: Llannefydd, Conwy County Borough
- Country: Wales
- Denomination: Church in Wales

History
- Status: active
- Dedication: Saint Nefydd and Saint Mary

Architecture
- Heritage designation: Grade I
- Designated: 30 January 1968
- Architect: Henry Harold Hughes (restoration)
- Architectural type: Church
- Groundbreaking: 1500, with earlier origins

Administration
- Diocese: St Asaph
- Archdeaconry: St Asaph
- Deanery: Denbigh
- Parish: Mission Area of Denbigh

The Church of St Nefydd and St Mary is an active parish church in the village of Llannefydd, Conwy County Borough, Wales. The village lies 5m south-east of Abergele. Cadw records that the present church dates from c.1550, although it certainly had earlier origins. It was restored in 1859 and again in 1908–1909 by Henry Harold Hughes. The church is designated by Cadw as a Grade I listed building.

== History ==
The Church of St Nefydd and St Mary stands in the centre of the village of Llannefydd, 5m south-east of Abergele and close to the border with Denbighshire. The dedications are to Saint Nefydd, a sixth-century Welsh saint of whom almost nothing is known beyond his reputedly being a grandson of Brychan, king of Brycheiniog, and Saint Mary. Nefydd supposedly founded the church in the 5th century, but there is no documentary evidence relating to it which predates 1291. Cadw dates the present church to c.1500, while acknowledging that this was certainly a rebuilding of an earlier church. The circular churchyard and the dedication suggest its origins as a clas church.

The church was restored in the mid-19th century and again between 1908 and 1909 by Henry Harold Hughes. The church remains an active parish church in the Diocese of St Asaph and regular services are held.

== Architecture and description ==
St Nefydd and St Mary's consists of a double nave, a western bellcote and a south porch. The building material is mainly local limestone with roofing in Welsh slate. Edward Hubbard, in his Clwyd volume in the Buildings of Wales series, describes it as a "double-nave Perpendicular church, and a particularly pleasing one". The pulpit is in the Arts & Crafts style and was designed by Hughes. The Royal Commission on the Ancient and Historical Monuments of Wales (RCAHMW) records a Hanoverian coat of arms painted on slate.

St Nefydd and St Mary is a Grade I listed building. Its Cadw listing record calls it a "fine and well-preserved late medieval parish church". A bier house and a sundial in the churchyard are both listed at Grade II.

== Sources ==
- Hubbard, Edward (2003). Clwyd: Denbighshire and Flintshire. The Buildings of Wales. New Haven, US and London: Yale University Press. ISBN 978-0-140-71052-6.
