= Llansannan =

Village and community in Conwy, Wales

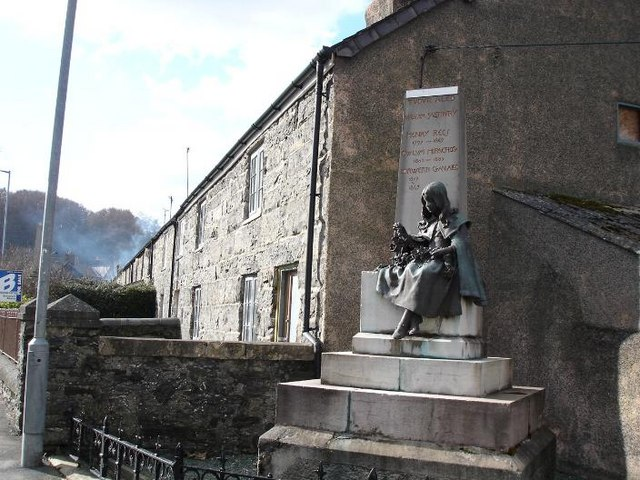
- "The Girl" in Llansannan

- Location within Conwy
- Population: 1,335 (2011)
- OS grid reference: SH934655
- Community: Llansannan
- Principal area: Conwy
- Preserved county: Clwyd
- Country: Wales
- Sovereign state: United Kingdom
- Post town: DENBIGH
- Postcode district: LL16
- Dialling code: 01745
- Police: North Wales
- Fire: North Wales
- Ambulance: Welsh
- UK Parliament: Bangor Aberconwy
- Senedd Cymru – Welsh Parliament: Clwyd West
- List of places UK Wales Conwy 53.176°N 3.595°W Map of the community

Llansannan is a rural village and community in Conwy County Borough, Wales. It lies on the bank of the River Aled and is about 8 miles to the south of Abergele and 9 miles (14 km) to the west of Denbigh. The population was 1,291 in 2001, with 67% able to speak Welsh. The figures for the 2011 census were: population 1,335 with 63% able to speak Welsh. The community includes the hamlets of Bylchau, Rhydgaled and Y Groes, and the lake Llyn Aled and reservoir Aled Isaf on Mynydd Hiraethog. Llansannan is in the traditional county of Denbighshire.

== Amenities ==
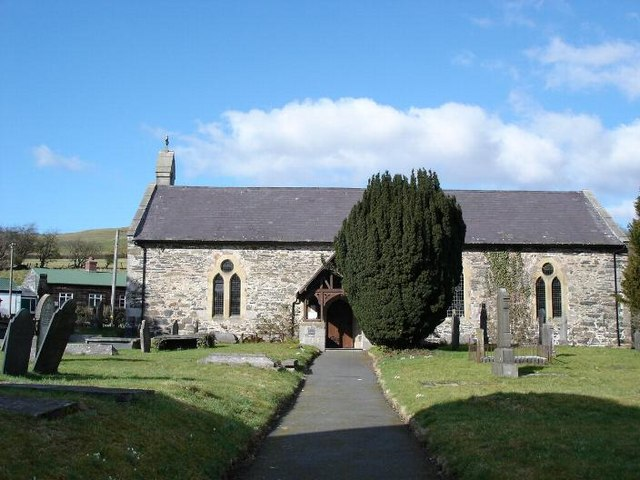
St Sannan's church

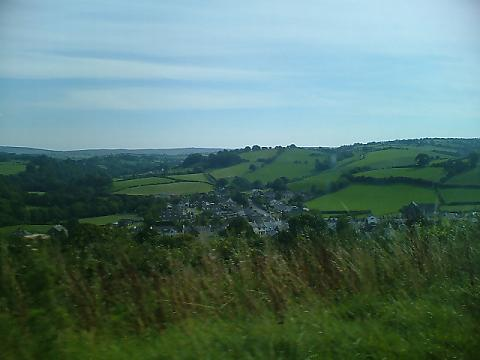
Llansannan

The village contains the Red Lion Inn and Ysgol Bro Aled primary school.

A village landmark is the statue of the "Little Girl" that commemorates notable figures from the area. The work of William Goscombe John, the statue was officially unveiled in 1899, shortly after the death of local politician T. E. Ellis, whose brainchild it had been.

The parish church of St Sannan is a grade II* listed building. Founded by the Irish bishop, St Sannan, it was first mentioned in 1254 and restored in 1878/9. None of the medieval features survived the restoration.

== Governance ==
A Llansannan electoral ward exists, which stretches beyond the confines of Llansannan community to include neighbouring Llannefydd. It had a total population taken at the 2011 census of 1,925.

Llansannan and Bylchau also elect community councillors to represent them on Llansannan Community Council.

== Sport ==
Clwb Pêl-droed Llansannan (Llansannan Football Club) compete in Vale of Clwyd and Conwy Football League.

The third stage of the Tour of Britain Women's cycle race passed through Llansannan in 2026.

== Notable residents ==
- Tudur Aled – late medieval Welsh poet.
- Tara Bethan – actress in Rownd a Rownd and theatrical performer.
- Gwenno Mair Davies – Crown winner at the Urdd National Eisteddfod, grew up in the village
- Sir William Mars-Jones – High Court judge
- Edward Parry (Methodist preacher) – preacher, poet and hymn writer
- William Rees – usually known by his bardic name of Gwilym Hiraethog, was a Welsh poet and author, one of the major figures of Welsh literature during the 19th century.
- William Salesbury – leading scholar of the Renaissance and the principal translator of the 1567 Welsh New Testament.
- Orig Williams – wrestler known as El Bandito
