= Llangwm, Conwy =

Village and community in Conwy, Wales

Llangwm
- Ty'n-y-bryn

- Location within Conwy
- Population: 470 (2011)
- OS grid reference: SH964445
- Community: Llangwm
- Principal area: Conwy
- Preserved county: Clwyd
- Country: Wales
- Sovereign state: United Kingdom
- Post town: CORWEN
- Postcode district: LL21
- Dialling code: 01490
- Police: North Wales
- Fire: North Wales
- Ambulance: Welsh
- UK Parliament: Clwyd West
- Senedd Cymru – Welsh Parliament: Clwyd West
- List of places UK Wales Conwy 52.988°N 3.543°W Map of the community

Llangwm is a village and community in Conwy County Borough, in Wales. It is located in the valley of the Afon Medrad, close to the borders with Denbighshire and Gwynedd, 2.9 miles (4.7 km) south of Cerrigydrudion, 7.8 miles (12.6 km) west of Corwen and 27.9 miles (44.9 km) south east of Conwy. At the 2001 census the community had a population of 516, decreasing to 470 at the 2011 census. It is one of three communities in the Uwchaled ward, and includes the hamlets of Dinmael, Gellioedd, Glan-yr-afon, Llangwm, Maerdy, and Ty-nant.

The Old House at Cysulog, north-west of Maerdy, is a 1 1/2-storey 17th-century farmhouse built of stone, with slate roofs and some weatherboarding. It bears date panels showing both 1650 and 1652, and is Grade II* listed. In the centre of Maerdy, Gwesty y Gafr (English: The Goat Hotel) is an early 19th-century inn, which still retains the character of a roadside hostelry. It is Grade II listed. Saint Jerome's Church in Llangwm is also Grade II listed. Although there was a church on the site as early as 1210, the present building is medieval, but was substantially rebuilt in 1747, and further restored in 1873. A 14th-century heraldic stone is set in the gable of the porch. On the hillside north of the village, above the Afon Ceirw, Cefn-nannau Methodist Chapel was built for the Calvinistic Methodists in 1801, and rebuilt in 1896. It is considered an example of an unaltered late-Victorian country chapel, and is similarly Grade II listed.

Aled Owen is a hill farmer from Ty-nant, who has secured himself a reputation as a world-class sheepdog trial competitor. With his dog Llangwm Bob, he won the 2002 World Sheepdog Trial Championship at Bala, going on to with the 2008 event at Llandeilo with Roy. He also took first place at the 2007 International Sheepdog Trials at Burnchurch Castle in Ireland, again with Roy, equalling the record of three wins with three different dogs. He had previously won in 1999, with an earlier dog named Roy, and in 2000 with Llangwm Bob.
