= Kinmel Hall =

Mansion in Conwy County Borough, Wales

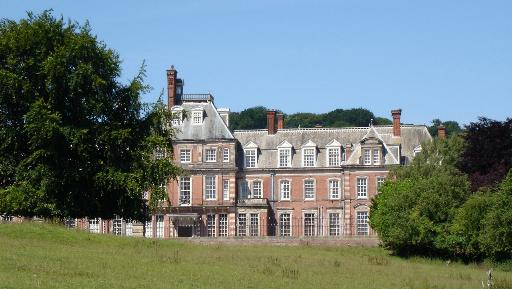
- The façade of Kinmel Hall

- Location within Conwy

General information
- Architectural style: Queen Anne Revival
- Location: Conwy county borough, Wales
- Coordinates: 53.2616°N 3.5291°W
- Construction started: 1871
- Completed: 1874
- Client: Hugh Robert Hughes

Design and construction
- Architect: William Eden Nesfield
- Designations: Grade I listed building

Kinmel Hall is a country house within a large park near the village of St. George, close to the coastal town of Abergele, in Conwy county borough, Wales. The hall, the third building on the site, was completed in the mid-19th century for the family of a Welsh mining magnate. In 1929, the property ceased being a private residence; it has since been used as a boys' school, health spa, girls' school, wartime hospital, conference centre and hotel.

Since 2001 Kinmel Hall has remained empty after plans by several owners to renovate the building failed. In 2015 the Victorian Society placed the hall on its top ten list of at-risk Victorian and Edwardian buildings. In 2021 a campaign started to save Kinmel Hall from dereliction. The hall is a Grade I listed building and its gardens and parkland are designated on the Cadw/ICOMOS Register of Parks and Gardens of Special Historic Interest in Wales.

== History ==
=== Early hall ===
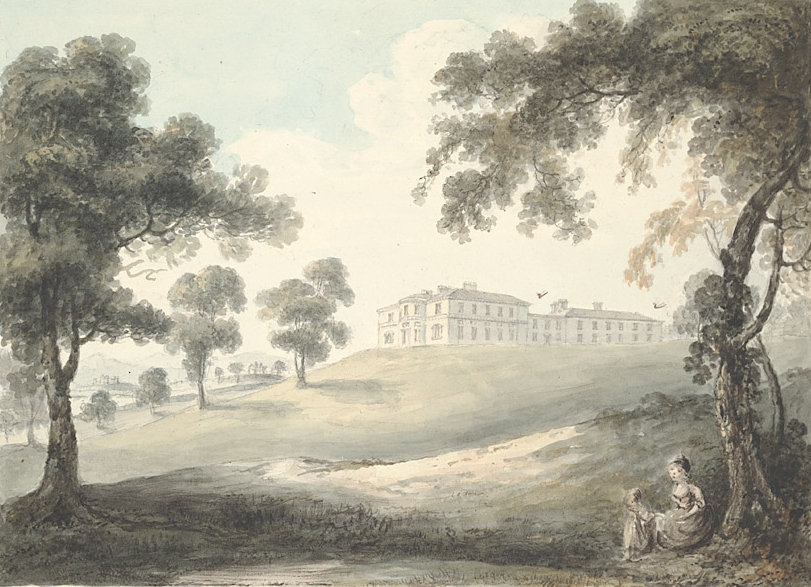
The original house in Kinmel Park c. 1794.

The original Kinmel Hall was owned by the Reverend Edward Hughes. In 1786 it passed to his son 1st Baron Dinorben (1767-1852). Lord Dinorben's own son and heir, William Lewis Hughes, 2nd Baron Dinorben, was disabled and died just eight months after inheriting Kinmel Hall and the title became extinct. The estate passed to William Hughes' cousin, Hugh Robert Hughes.

=== Expansion and redevelopment ===
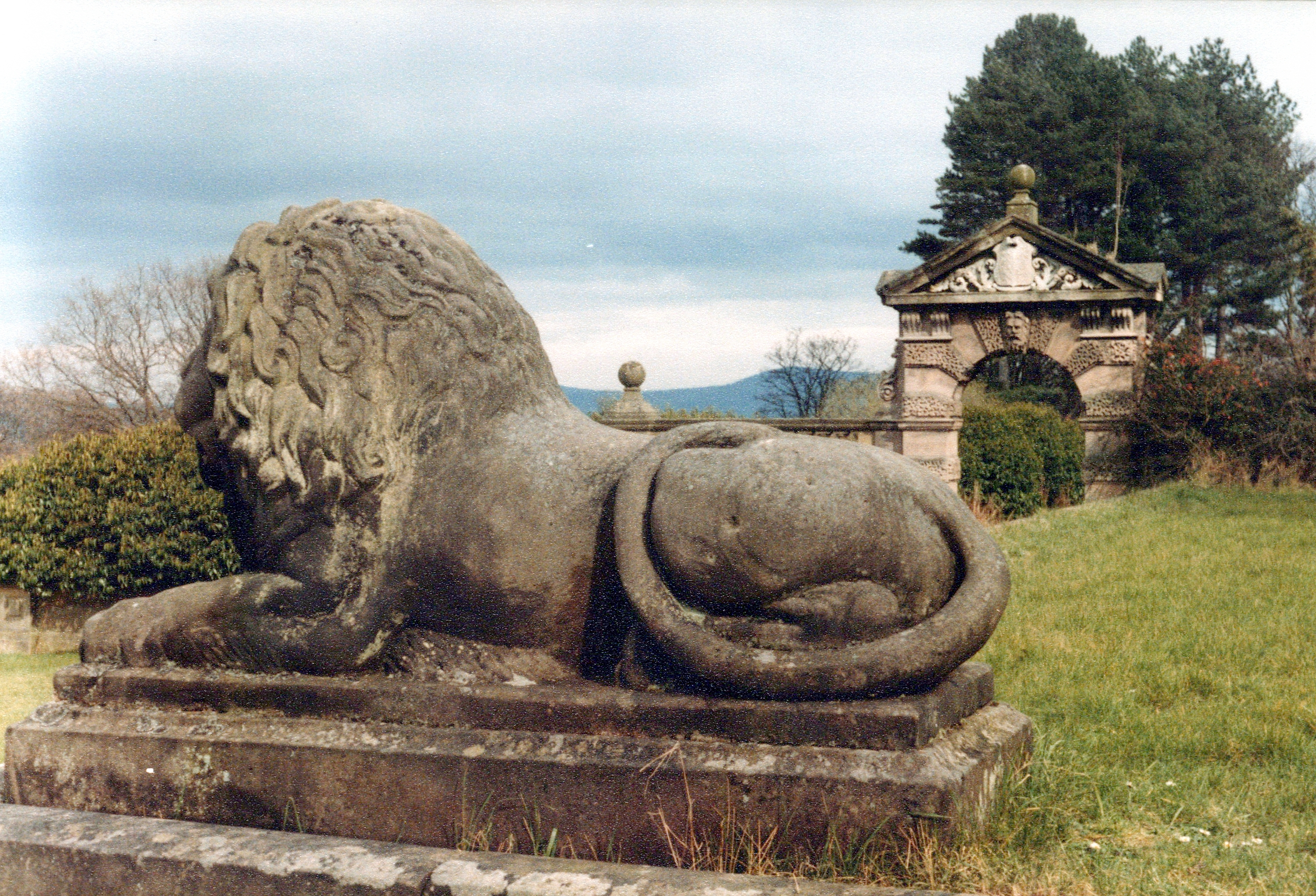
Lion sculpture in grounds

Hugh Robert Hughes was from the Hughes copper mining family. It was he who was responsible for the present Queen Anne Revival chateau-style house, which is the third on the site. On inheriting the property, Hughes immediately began developing the hall and its parkland.

The old hall was completely remodelled and expanded. The new palatial house, which was built between 1871 and 1874, was designed by William Eden Nesfield. Materials for construction were bought from the nearby Lleweni Hall. The building is an example of a calendar house. It has 365 windows, 12 entrances, and 122 rooms.

The 1870s hall follows the Victorian fashion for specialisation: many rooms were devoted to single activities, such as that used for the ironing of newspapers, so that the ink would not come off on the reader's hands. The building also featured a number of advanced Victorian machines that were used to power both a lift and a water fountain. The hall was lit by a private gasworks which operated until 1929.

The adjoining Venetian Gardens were designed by Nesfield's father, W. A. Nesfield. The hall stands within walled gardens of around 18 acres (73,000 m^{2}). The parkland around the hall covers 5,000 acres (20 km^{2}), encompassing open fields, parkland and forests. The gardens and park are listed at Grade II* on the Cadw/ICOMOS Register of Parks and Gardens of Special Historic Interest in Wales.

At the same time the hall was being built, major landscaping was undertaken to build a new 1.5 mi (2.4 km) approach to the hall called Coed y Drive to the north of Kinmel Park. One of its gateway lodges (Llwyni Lodge (Golden Lodge) designed by Nesfield is a listed building.

Kinmel Hall was privately owned by members of the Hughes, Lewis and Fetherstonhaugh and Gill families until it was sold as a leasehold in 1929. Heraldic shields displayed throughout the hall show the unions between these families.

=== Institutional use ===
After the hall was sold, it became a boys school for a short while before it was converted in the 1930s to a health centre for the treatment of people with rheumatism. It remained open until the outbreak of World War II, when the hall was taken over as a military hospital. Post-war the hall became the Clarendon School for Girls. The independent school remained at Kinmel Hall until an extensive fire in 1975, which saw its relocation to Bedfordshire. After businessman Eddie Vince restored the building, it was used as a Christian conference centre until the house was sold at auction in 2001 to a property company. However, the proposed redevelopment did not materialise.

=== Dereliction and preservation attempts ===
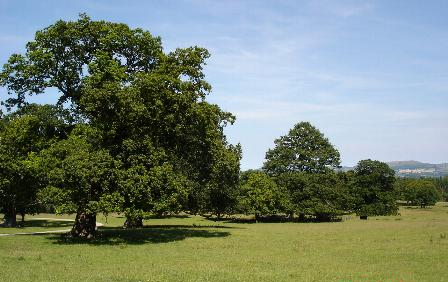
Kinmel Park (closed to the public)

Despite selling the leasehold of Kinmel Hall in 1929, the freehold and the surrounding parkland remained in the possession of the Hughes, Lewis and Fetherstonhaugh family until 2001. (Note: The wider Kinmel Estate surrounding the hall remains the property of the Fetherstonhaugh family, descendants of the Hughes, who live at Plas Kinmel.) In that year the freehold was sold, since then it passed through several owners before the property was to be put up for sale by auction in October 2011 with a reserve price of £1.5 million which did not include the 5,000 acres (2,000 ha) of surrounding Kinmel Park. It was bought shortly before auction by Acer Properties Ltd BVI with a successful bid of £1.45m. The company's declared intention was to develop the property into a hotel, but these plans also failed and the hall remained empty and continued to deteriorate and to suffer vandalism and theft.

In 2015 the Victorian Society placed Kinmel on its list of the top ten most at-risk Victorian and Edwardian buildings in the United Kingdom. In early 2021 a campaign group published articles in the media with the aim of shaming its owners into either explaining their intentions, fully restoring it or selling it on. They also attempted to put pressure on Conwy County Borough Council and the Welsh government into helping to preserve the building. Conwy Council placed an injunction to prevent "unauthorised" work on the site and explored further action. The hall was put up for sale at auction in April 2021, with a guide price of £750,000. There were only three bidders and the hall was sold for £950,000 The buyer was a Mr Chris Cryer who had purchased the hall through a company and sought to establish a camping pod facility within the grounds. In October 2021, the local council told the owners to stop renting out pods because they had not applied for planning permission and the location in the Venetian Garden was not in keeping with its listed status. In early 2022, the new owners submitted applications for planning permission to site the pods in a different location; they withdrew the application following strong objections from residents within Kinmel Park and other campaign groups. In 2024 the Kinmel Hall Preservation Trust, which had worked to support redevelopment of the site and renovation of the mansion, was dissolved. In the same year, full restoration costs for the hall were estimated in the region of £50-70m.

== Architecture and description ==
Hugh Robert Hughes' reconstruction of Kinmel was on the grand scale - the house has been described as "the Welsh Versailles". Edward Hubbard, writing in his Clwyd volume in the Pevsner Buildings of Wales series, reissued in 2003, saw closer similarities to Hampton Court Palace, a building Hughes is known to have visited with Nesfield in 1868. (Note: When Edward Hubbard was writing his guide, first published in 1986 and revised in 1994, the house was in the ownership of Eddie Vince and a major programme of renovation was being undertaken. Hubbard's hopes that this would see the full restoration of the house were unfulfilled.) Hubbard describes Kinmel's architectural style as of "key importance" in the development of the Queen Anne Revival, a style much favoured by Nesfield and taken to greater prominence by his early architectural partner, R. Norman Shaw. The architectural historian, Mark Girouard wrote of the Revival; "it was a kind of architectural cocktail, with a little genuine Queen Anne in it, a little Dutch, a little Flemish, a squeeze of Robert Adam, a generous dash of Wren, and a touch of François I".

The hall is built of "fine", and expensive, red brick, to a height of two storeys, with extensive attics in a series of steeply pitched Mansard roofs. Decoration is provided by ashlar dressings for the window surrounds and pediments, and much decorative carving including sunflowers and roundels. The chimney stacks have terracotta panels decorated with similar motifs. The eastern, entrance front, has 15 bays and extends for 190ft. (Note: Cadw defines the frontage as being of 17 bays.) Both the eastern and western, garden, fronts have terminating pavilions and culminate in large central porticos, although Hubbard notes that these are not in alignment, as the entrance front is longer than the garden frontage.

To the south of the house is an extensive range of service buildings, set around two courtyards. The coach house and stable range dates from the 1850s, and has been attributed either to William Burn, or to G. A. Burn, an employee of Thomas Hopper who had responsibility for the practice in Hopper's later years. The style is Neoclassical.

The interior of the mansion was designed on a scale to match the exterior. Hubbard notes the "ornate[.] chimneypieces, pedimented doorcases and plaster ceilings". The plan produced in Girouard's Victorian Country House shows all of the usual social rooms of a grand 19th-century country house; a ballroom, a drawing room, a saloon, a dining room, a billiard room, an owner's room and business room, two smoking rooms and a chapel. Bedrooms were located on the upper floors. On the main floor of the service wing were situated two kitchens, a servants hall, pantry, meat larder, scullery, bakehouse, a safe, large closets for shoes, lamps and knives, and a brushing room. The interiors have suffered as a result of two fires, institutional use and a quarter-century of disuse and neglect.

=== Historic listing designations ===
The Kinmel Park estate contains a considerable number of structures with historic listing designations. The two listed at the highest grade, Grade I, are: the hall, and the Llwyni (or Golden) Lodge.

Structures listed at the next highest grade, Grade II*, include: the park itself; the entrance screen to the house; the coach house and stables and the Morfa Lodge at the northernmost entrance to the park. A range of buildings associated with Plas Kinmel, the home farm for the Kinmel Estate, are also listed at Grade II* including: Plas Kinmel; the north, west and east farm ranges attached to the Plas; and the piggery.

18 structures are listed Grade II. These include: features of the Venetian Garden; columns, a fountain, walls and gates, and a gazebo and summer house; elements of the wider gardens; the Adam and Eve Gate, a bridge and gates and piers at the eastern and western ends of the Broad Walk; a range of structures relating to the kitchen garden, a garden house, an ice house, the kitchen garden walls, and the derelict ruins of Old Kinmel Hall; a house at Plas Kinmel, Bodoryn-fach; and a range of lodges and gates at the perimeter of the estate.

== Sources ==
- Girouard, Mark (1979). The Victorian Country House. New Haven, US and London: Yale University Press. ISBN 978-0-300-02390-9.
- — (1984) [1977]. Sweetness and Light: The Queen Anne Movement, 1860–1900. New Haven, US and London: Yale University Press. ISBN 978-0-300-03068-6.
- Hilling, John B. (2018). The Architecture of Wales: From the First to the Twenty-First Centuries. Cardiff: University of Wales Press. ISBN 978-1-786-83285-6. OCLC 1257790624.
- Hubbard, Edward (2003). Clwyd: Denbighshire and Flintshire. The Buildings of Wales. New Haven, US and London: Yale University Press. ISBN 978-0-140-71052-6. OCLC 1052818155.
