= Henryd =

Village and community in Conwy, Wales

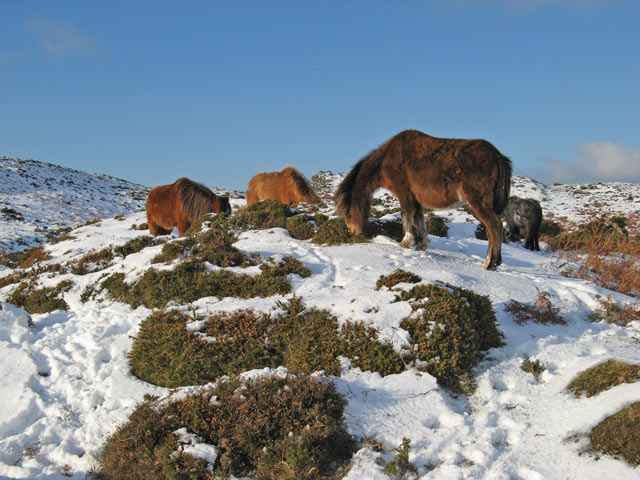
- Wild Carneddau ponies in the hills above Henryd

- Location within Conwy
- Population: 715 (2011)
- OS grid reference: SH769747
- Community: Henryd
- Principal area: Conwy
- Preserved county: Clwyd
- Country: Wales
- Sovereign state: United Kingdom
- Post town: CONWY
- Postcode district: LL32
- Dialling code: 01492
- Police: North Wales
- Fire: North Wales
- Ambulance: Welsh
- UK Parliament: Bangor Aberconwy
- Senedd Cymru – Welsh Parliament: Aberconwy
- List of places UK Wales Conwy 53.255°N 3.845°W Map of the community

Henryd (Welsh pronunciation) is a village and community on the western slopes of the Conwy valley in Conwy county borough, north Wales. It lies about 2 miles (3.2 km) south of Conwy, off the B5106 road. At the 2001 census, it had a population of 594, increasing to 715 at the 2011 census.

The meaning of Henryd in English is "Old ford", with hen meaning "old" and rhyd (mutated to ryd) meaning "ford".

The River Henryd, a tributary of the River Conwy, flows through the village. The village has a Nonconformist chapel and a small primary school Ysgol Llangelynnin.

The oldest building in the village is Ffarm Henryd (Henryd Farm). The field behind Maes Refail estate is known as Cae Ffarm (Farm field). The village well still exists in the field on the other side of the river.

Plas Iolyn is a grade II listed country house set in its own grounds some 1.5 km (1 mile) north of the village.

The community includes the settlements of Llechwedd, Groesffordd and Iolyn Park.

The village is a popular starting point for walks in the northern Snowdonia mountains, especially the Carneddau. Nearby is Parc Mawr, an area of woodland now owned by the Woodland Trust, who are replacing the 1960s-planted conifers with native species. Also nearby is the Roman road route through Bwlch-y-Ddeufaen, and the ancient 12th century parish church of Llangelynnin.
