= Llanfihangel Glyn Myfyr =

Village and community in Conwy, Wales

- The Crown Inn

- Location within Conwy
- Population: 189 (2011)
- OS grid reference: SH991492
- Community: Llanfihangel Glyn Myfyr
- Principal area: Conwy
- Preserved county: Clwyd
- Country: Wales
- Sovereign state: United Kingdom
- Post town: CORWEN
- Postcode district: LL21
- Dialling code: 01490
- Police: North Wales
- Fire: North Wales
- Ambulance: Welsh
- UK Parliament: Bangor Aberconwy
- Senedd Cymru – Welsh Parliament: Clwyd West
- List of places UK Wales Conwy 53.031°N 3.506°W Map of the community

Llanfihangel Glyn Myfyr is a village and community in Conwy County Borough, in Wales. It is located within the historic county of Denbighshire (on the border with Merionethshire) on the Afon Alwen, at the south western edge of the Clocaenog Forest, 9.1 miles (14.6 km) north west of Corwen, 2.5 miles (4.0 km) east of Cerrigydrudion and 27.5 miles (44.3 km) south of Conwy. At the 2001 census the community had a population of 195, reducing to 189 at the 2011 census. The majority of the population are Welsh speaking.

The old farmhouse at Bodtegir, south east of the village, built in 1655 by William Salesbury, the Royalist governor of Denbigh Castle during the English Civil War, is Grade II* listed, as is Saint Michael's Church. Pont Llyn Gigfran, which carries a minor road to Betws Gwerfil Goch over the Afon Alwen, in the south east of the community, is Grade II listed.

The antiquary Owen Jones, who compiled The Myvyrian Archaiology of Wales, published between 1801 and 1807, was born in the community. He died in 1814 and was buried in London, but his gravestone was removed to Llanfihangel Glyn Myfyr after the churchyard at All-Hallows-the-Less was damaged by bombing in World War II.
