= Llannefydd =

Village in Conwy County Borough, Wales

Llannefydd: Welsh: Llanefydd
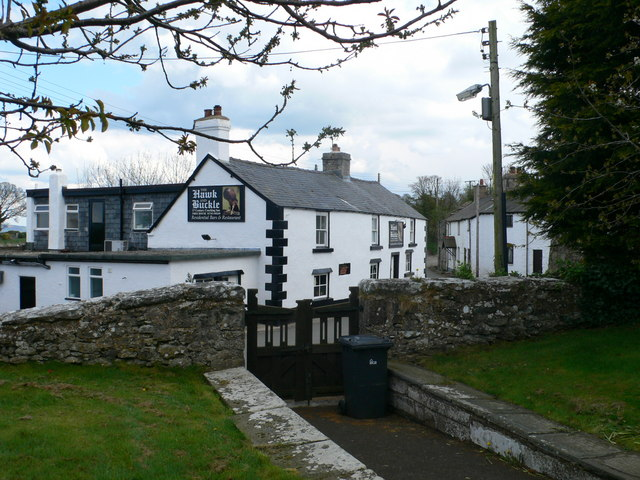
- Llannefydd

- Location within Conwy
- Population: 590 (2011)
- OS grid reference: SH981706
- Community: Llannefydd
- Principal area: Conwy
- Preserved county: Clwyd
- Country: Wales
- Sovereign state: United Kingdom
- Post town: DENBIGH
- Postcode district: LL16
- Dialling code: 01745
- Police: North Wales
- Fire: North Wales
- Ambulance: Welsh
- UK Parliament: Bangor Aberconwy
- Senedd Cymru – Welsh Parliament: Clwyd West
- List of places UK Wales Conwy 53.223°N 3.527°W Map of the community

Llannefydd (sometimes Welsh: Llanefydd) is a village and community in Conwy County Borough, in Wales. It is located on the border with Denbighshire, between the Afon Aled and River Elwy, 5.7 miles (9.2 km) north west of Denbigh, 5.8 miles (9.3 km) south west of St Asaph, 6.9 miles (11.1 km) south of Abergele and 15.2 miles (24.5 km) south east of Conwy. In the 2011 census the community parish had a population of 590. The community includes the village of Cefn Berain and part of the hamlet of Bont Newydd.

Saint Nefydd and Saint Mary's church, founded in the fifth century, is Grade I listed; the farms of Berain and Plas Uchaf are Grade II* listed, with Plas Uchaf's gardens being listed at Grade II on the Cadw/ICOMOS Register of Parks and Gardens of Special Historic Interest in Wales. Numerous agricultural buildings in the community, along with a number of bridges over the two rivers, are Grade II listed. In 1978, archaeological excavations in a cave at Bont-newydd, in the east of the community, unearthed the teeth and jawbone of an 11-year-old Neanderthal boy dating from 230,000 years ago, the oldest human remains discovered in Wales.

Thomas Edwards, better known as the Welsh language dramatist and poet Twm o'r Nant, was born in Llannefydd in 1738, but fled to Llandeilo to avoid imprisonment for his uncle's debts, for which he had stood surety. His anterliwtau (English: interludes), satirical musical plays, lambasted tax collectors, landlords, lawyers and the religious hypocrisy of the established church, and promoted Methodism.

Nearby is the hill Mynydd y Gaer which has a hillfort and is 280 metres (919 feet) with views stretching to Snowdonia, the Clwydian Range and Mynydd Hiraethog.

Llannefydd unveiled a new playing field in 1999, after seven years of work. The local football team is Llannefydd F.C.
