= Eglwysbach =

Village and community in Conwy, Wales

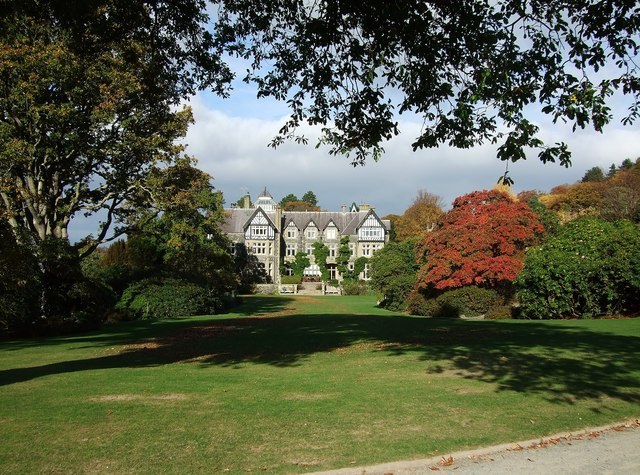
- Bodnant Hall

- Location within Conwy
- Population: 935 (2011)
- OS grid reference: SH804705
- Community: Eglwysbach
- Principal area: Conwy
- Preserved county: Clwyd
- Country: Wales
- Sovereign state: United Kingdom
- Post town: LLANRWST
- Postcode district: LL26
- Post town: COLWYN BAY
- Postcode district: LL28
- Dialling code: 01492
- Police: North Wales
- Fire: North Wales
- Ambulance: Welsh
- UK Parliament: Bangor Aberconwy
- Senedd Cymru – Welsh Parliament: Bangor Conwy Môn
- List of places UK Wales Conwy 53.218°N 3.791°W Map of the community

Eglwysbach is a village and community in Conwy county borough, Wales. The village plays host to an annual Agricultural show and horticultural show in August, which includes displays of local cattle, sheep, heavy and light horses, showjumping a horticulture marquee, fairground rides and trades stands. At the 2001 census, it had a population of 928, increasing slightly to 935 at the 2011 census.

54% of the residents of Eglwysbach speak the Welsh language, as recorded in the 2001 census. Nearby is Bodnant Garden, a National Trust property. The village has a public house at its centre, The Bee Inn. St. Martin's parish church is in the Diocese of St Asaph of the Church in Wales. To the south of the village is Plas-yn-Llan, a home of Sir John Wynn, 5th Baronet, of Wynnstay. The house is a Grade II listed building and its gardens and grounds are listed, also at Grade II on the Cadw/ICOMOS Register of Parks and Gardens of Special Historic Interest in Wales.

The name Eglwysbach can be taken to mean 'the small/insignificant church', thus it has the same meaning as Ecclefechan, Scotland. Both locations are derived from a Brythonic language.

== Governance ==
An electoral ward in the same name exists. This ward stretches south from Eglwysbach to include Llanddoged with a total population taken at the 2011 census of 1,537.

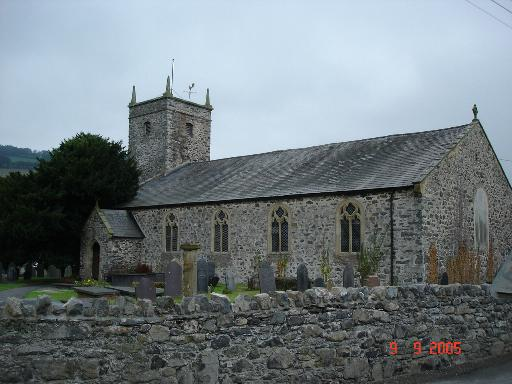
St. Martin's Church, Eglwysbach
