= Llanddoged and Maenan =

Community in Conwy, Wales

Llanddoged and Maenan: Welsh: Llanddoged a Maenan
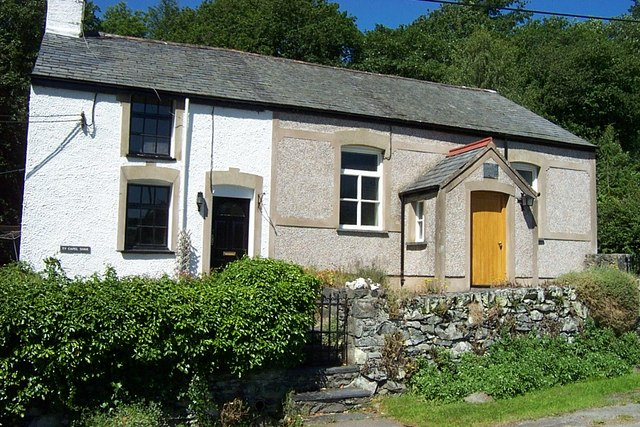
- Capel Soar at Maenan

- Location within Conwy
- Population: 602 (2011)
- OS grid reference: SH8063
- Community: Llanddoged and Maenan
- Principal area: Conwy
- Preserved county: Clwyd
- Country: Wales
- Sovereign state: United Kingdom
- Post town: LLANRWST
- Postcode district: LL26
- Dialling code: 01492
- Police: North Wales
- Fire: North Wales
- Ambulance: Welsh
- UK Parliament: Bangor Aberconwy
- Senedd Cymru – Welsh Parliament: Aberconwy
- List of places UK Wales Conwy 53.155°N 3.789°W Map of the community

Llanddoged and Maenan (Welsh: Llanddoged a Maenan) is a community in Conwy County Borough, in Wales. It is located in the Conwy Valley, on the eastern bank of the River Conwy, 2.3 miles (3.7 km) north east of Llanrwst, 15.7 miles (25.3 km) south west of Abergele and 13.3 miles (21.4 km) south of Conwy. The community includes the village of Llanddoged and the rural settlements around Maenan. At the 2001 census it had a population of 574, increasing to 602 at the 2011 census.

In 1283 Edward I of England forced the monks of Aberconwy Abbey, in Conwy, to relocate to Maenan, to make way for the castle and fortifications he was building in the town. The abbey survived until it was dissolved by Henry VIII in 1538. A house was built on the site, which was replaced in 1852 by what is now the Maenan Abbey Hotel. Drainage work at the hotel in 2011 unearthed remains of the abbey buildings. Nearby Maenan Hall is a 15th-century timber-framed house containing elaborate Elizabethan plasterwork, which is Grade I listed. The house was bought in 1946, and restored, by Henry McLaren, who was responsible for developing Bodnant Garden, as a dower house for his wife Christabel. The garden, which is open to the public a few days each year, was developed by McLaren and, after his death in 1953, his widow and their youngest son, Christopher McLaren. To the east stands Caer Oleu, a prehistoric hillfort.

Saint Doged's Church, set in a circular churchyard in Llanddoged, was rebuilt in 1839, but was originally a sixth-century martyrium constructed to shelter the grave of Saint Doged. It is Grade II* listed. Nearby, the waters of Saint Doged's Well were reputed to cure eye-disorders.

Mary Vaughan Jones was born in Maenan in 1918. An infants teacher, she is best known as the author of more than 40 Welsh children's books. She is remembered by an award presented every three years by the Welsh Books Council to recognise outstanding contributions to children's books in Wales.
