= St Mary and All Saints' Church, Conwy =

Church in Conwy, Wales

Coordinates: 53.2807°N 3.8288°W

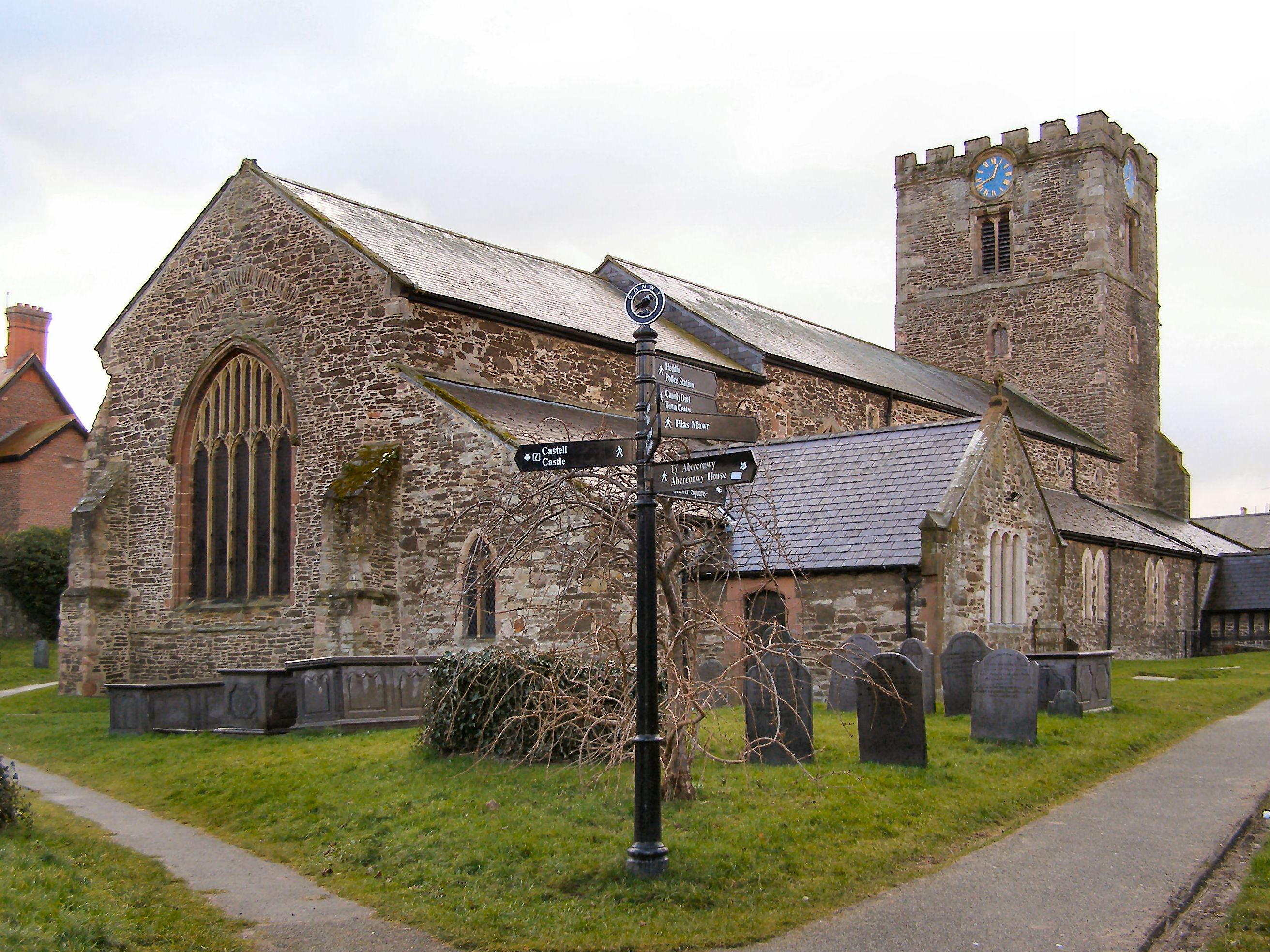
St Mary and All Saints Church

The Church of St Mary & All Saints is the parish church of Conwy, Wales in the United Kingdom. It was originally the Cistercian Aberconwy Abbey, but in 1283 King Edward I of England moved the Abbey to Maenan. The parish registers date back to 1541.

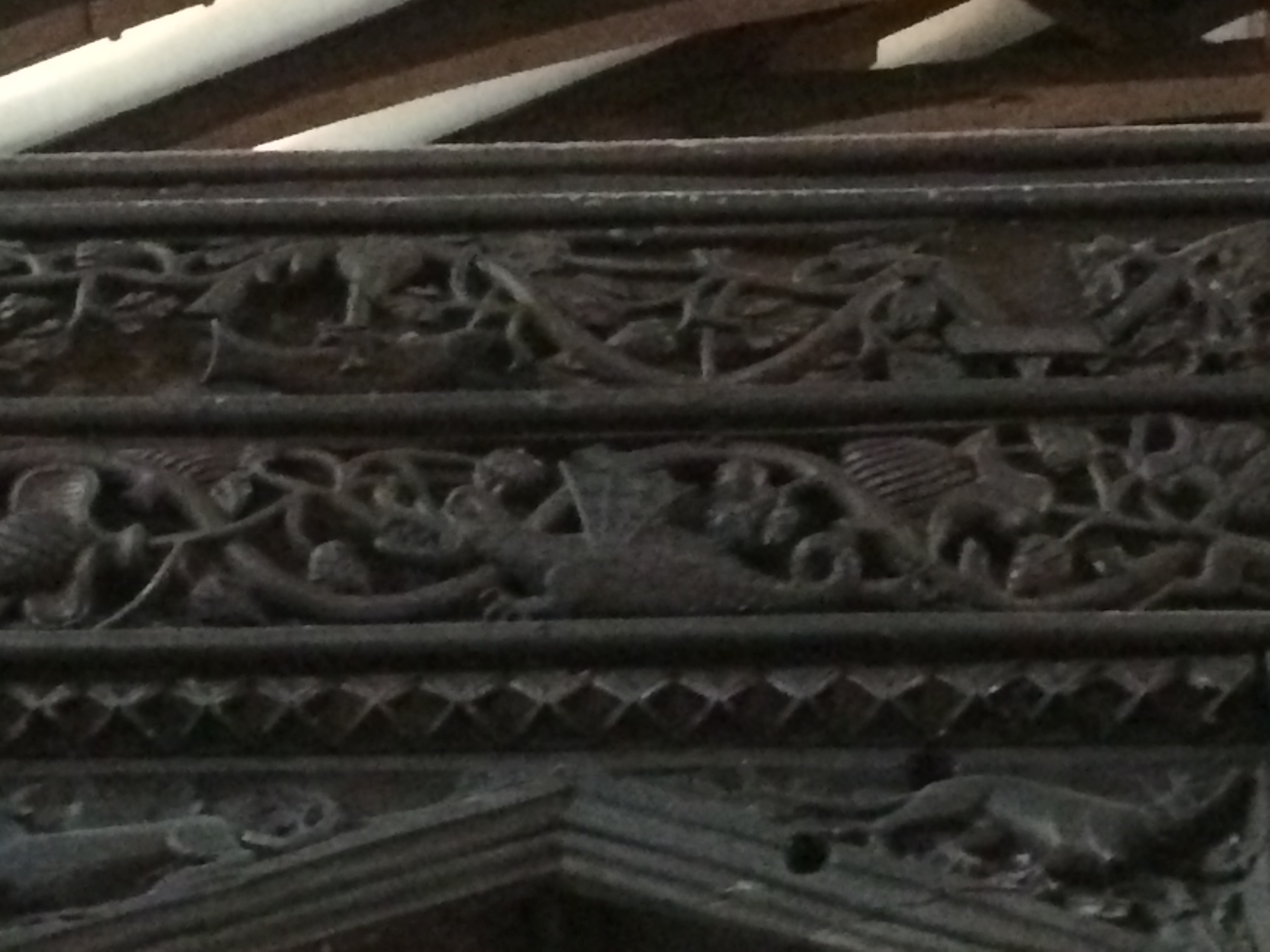
Dragon Carving on Rood Screen

The foundations of the church date back to 1172, and the Aberconwy Abbey was completed in 1186. Since then the church has grown and changed. The East and West-end buttresses and parts of the walls, particularly on the North side, are original. In the fourteenth century, the church received the lower portion of its tower, the South transept, and the North and South porches. A room north of the tower was enclosed to serve as a charnel house. The fifteenth century saw the completion of the tower, and the installation of the rood screen and the early Tudor period baptismal font. This includes Sir Richard Pole's, badge, (an eagle's claw grabbing a fish) who was the constable of Conwy castle between 1488 and 1504.

In the sixteenth century the roofs over the aisles were raised. Next to the altar at the south end is the tomb of Robert Wynne, a major benefactor of St Mary's, and the builder of Plas Mawr on Conwy's High Street. The chancel floor was raised at a later date, and in 1872 the roof of the nave was raised by Gilbert Scott. At some point the South window of the transept was reconstructed and the clerestory windows were reset to where they now remain. Also in the nineteenth century, Lord Penrhyn donated the tower clock. In 1921 the church received a memorial chapel on the church's north side, and five years later the vestry was enlarged. In 1949 the former charnel house became the Parish Room. The church holds a number of objects of interest dating back to medieval times, and two windows in the nave's south aisle made by Morris & Co., a workshop with associations with the Pre-Raphaelite artist Edward Burne-Jones.

In the summer months the church is a venue for Conwy's Classical Music Festival, a series of weekly hour-long concerts by professional musicians.
