= Thomas Arthur Leonard =

Thomas Arthur Leonard OBE
- Born: 12 March 1864; Finsbury, London, England
- Died: 19 July 1948 (aged 84); Conwy, Wales
- Occupation(s): Social reformer, pioneer of outdoor holidays

Thomas Arthur Leonard OBE (12 March 1864 – 19 July 1948) was a British social reformer. He was a pioneer in developing organised outdoor holidays for working people through the Co-operative Holidays Association and the Holiday Fellowship. He also helped to establish the Youth Hostels Association and the Ramblers' Association.

== Early life and marriage ==
He was born in Finsbury, London, the son of Agnes and Thomas Leonard, a clock- and watchmaker who died when his son was five. He was then raised in Hackney by his mother, the daughter of a Congregationalist minister, and spent some time in Heidelberg, Germany as a child, before moving with his mother to Eastbourne, Sussex, where she ran a boarding house. He started work in Eastbourne as a clerk in a builder's office, and also taught at a Sunday school. In 1884 he enrolled to study at the Congregational Institute in Nottingham, run by Dr. John Brown Paton. He married Mary Arletta Coupe in 1888; they had a son, who died as a child, and a daughter.

== Church groups and the Co-operative Holidays Association ==
After completing his studies at the Congregational Institute, Leonard took up pastoral roles with the church in Barrow-in-Furness and Colne. He began encouraging members of his church's social guild to take "recreative and educational" holidays, rather than trips in "wakes week" to resorts such as Blackpool. In 1891 he organised a holiday for 32 members of the Dockray Square Congregational Church in Colne, at Ambleside in the Lake District. Leonard later wrote that: "In those days we were content with very primitive arrangements, so long as they gave us the joy and freedom of the open fells."

The success of his church trips led him to start organising holidays under the auspices of Paton's organisation, the National Home Reading Union (NHRU), which he continued to run after he moved from Colne back to London in 1895. He continued his pastoral duties until 1897, when he and Paton set up the Co-operative Holidays Association (CHA), with the aim of providing "recreative and educational holidays by purchasing or renting and furnishing houses and rooms in selected centres, by catering in such houses for parties of members and guests and by securing helpers who will promote the intellectual and social interests of the party with which they are associated".

His approach to encouraging working people to admire the natural world and develop themselves was influenced by Christian Socialism and by such figures as Matthew Arnold, John Ruskin, Henry Thoreau and William Morris. Early speakers at CHA holidays included Hardwicke Rawnsley, and Leonard himself supported the Independent Labour Party and spoke at rallies with Keir Hardie. After moving first to Whitby, then to Rhu on the Firth of Clyde, and then again to Hayfield in Derbyshire, he and his wife and daughter settled at Marple Bridge near Stockport in 1910. With Leonard as Secretary, the CHA grew in scale, and by 1913 had 13 British holiday centres catering for over 13,000 guests. With John Lewis Paton, the son of J. B. Paton, he also organised trips to centres in Switzerland, France, Germany, Norway and Denmark, and before the First World War arranged exchange visits between school and college students in Britain and Germany to encourage international friendship.

== Holiday Fellowship ==
At the end of 1912, Leonard announced that he was stepping down from the CHA to found a new organisation, the Holiday Fellowship (HF), partly because he disapproved of the CHA General Committee approach that encouraged more middle class rather than working class clients to stay in the centres, and partly because he wanted to develop the international relations side of the organisation. He wrote: "I have been conscious for some time that an important section of the Committee have lacked confidence in my judgement upon certain matters...".

The HF took over some of the CHA's centres, and established its headquarters at Bryn Corach near Conwy, in Wales. He remained General Secretary of the Holiday Fellowship until 1925, when it moved its head office to London, but remained as its International Secretary until 1930 and thereafter became its President in 1938. By 1947, the HF had grown to operate some 30 centres with over 45,000 guests; at the same time, the CHA ran some 25 centres with 30,000 guests. Leonard continually pushed for the organisation to promote more basic rather than luxurious accommodation.

== Other activities ==
During the First World War, Leonard became a staunch pacifist, and shortly afterwards joined the Society of Friends (Quakers). He was also involved in setting up the Youth Hostels Association (YHA), of which he was Vice-President from its inception in 1930; and the Ramblers' Association, of which he was President between 1935 and 1946. He founded the Friends of the Lake District in 1934, and pressed for the establishment of what eventually became the Pennine Way. He chaired the Grey Court Fellowship, founded in 1935 to provide holidays for unemployed workers and their families, and towards the end of his life set up the Family Holidays Association, to convert derelict Government training camps into holiday chalets. He was also a supporter of the Campaign for National Parks, the National Trust and the Campaign for the Protection of Rural England.

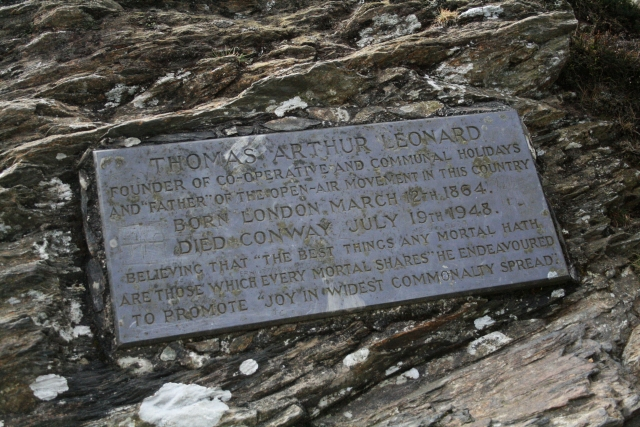
Memorial plaque at Catbells, near Keswick, Cumbria

== Honours and legacy ==
He was awarded the OBE in 1937, for his work in promoting outdoor activities. In his 1947 book, The Englishman's Holiday, J. A. R. Pimlott ranked Leonard alongside Thomas Cook and Billy Butlin as a pioneer of the holiday movement.

He died at Conwy in 1948, aged 84, and was survived by his wife and daughter. Memorial plaques were set up on Cadair Ifan Goch at Maenan above the Conwy Valley opposite Dolgarrog and on Catbells near Keswick in the Lake District, describing him as "the 'Father' of the Open-Air Movement in this Country", and bearing the epitaph: "Believing that 'the best things any mortal hath are those which every mortal shares' he endeavoured to promote 'joy in widest commonality spread'." The quotes come from the Quaker poet Lucy Larcom, and William Wordsworth.
