= Maenan =

Human settlement in Conwy, Wales

Coordinates: 53.182°N 3.805°W

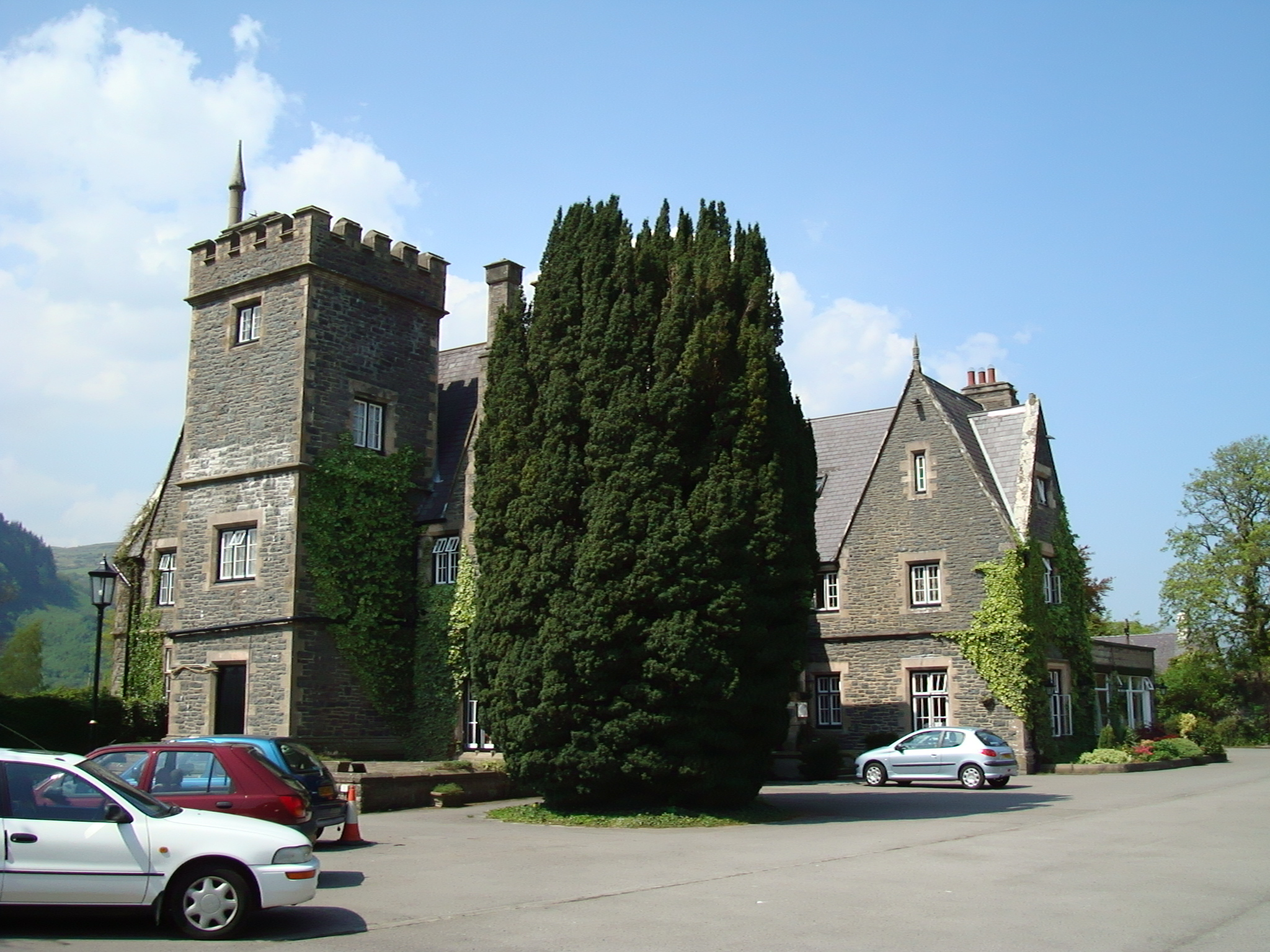
- Maenan Abbey

- Location within Conwy
- OS grid reference: SH793665
  - Cardiff: 168.4
- Community: Llanddoged and Maenan
- Principal area: Conwy
- Country: Wales
- Sovereign state: United Kingdom
- Post town: LLANRWST
- Postcode district: LL26
- Dialling code: 01492
- Police: North Wales
- Fire: North Wales
- Ambulance: Welsh
- UK Parliament: Bangor Aberconwy
- Senedd Cymru – Welsh Parliament: Aberconwy

Maenan is a rural settlement in Conwy, Wales, located approximately 4 miles to the north of Llanrwst and 3 miles to the south of the village of Eglwysbach. The population of the area is approximately 300 people, and more than 75% of the population are Welsh speakers. Maenan shares a community council with the nearby village of Llanddoged. The A470 trunk road passes through Maenan. The 2001 census shows that the villages of Llanddoged and Maenan had a combined population of 574.

== Economy ==
Most of the population are from farming or agriculture background. Maenan has a mixture of dairy and lowland sheep farming.

Maenan has a micro-brewery based at Penrhwylfa. The brewery is known as Bragdy'r Nant and started in 2007, and is now supplying to a number of pubs across the region.

Tourism is a fairly active trade in Maenan, mostly hospitality. There are a number of self-catering cottages, along with 2 hotels. The Maenan Abbey Hotel is the second site of Aberconwy Abbey, a Cistercian abbey. Another hotel in Maenan is The Plas Maenan hotel, located about a mile further north of the Maenan Abbey Hotel on the A470.

== Public transport ==
Maenan is served by Dolgarrog railway station, part of the Conwy Valley Line. Bus services through Maenan are limited.

Maenan is best known for a view point known as Cadair Ifan Goch. From this view point most of the Conwy Valley can be viewed. The path to the view point starts from the old Ysgol Maenan school building. The walk to the view point is about a mile from the car park, but it's well worth the short walk.

== Education ==
The school, Ysgol Maenan, closed in the early '90s. Children from Maenan now usually travel to Llanddoged or Eglwysbach for primary education, and to Ysgol Dyffryn Conwy in Llanrwst for secondary education. Most are eligible for free school transport.

== Religion ==
Maenan has two chapels: Capel Tan Soar and Capel Salem (on the border with Llanddoged) - both offering services on a Sunday in Welsh.

== Famous people ==
The celebrated Welsh children's author Mary Vaughan Jones was born at Nant y Pryfaid, now known as Firs Cottage. The family moved to Wigfa, Maenan when she was 7 years old. The census return supports this. She is most famous for creating the character Sali Mali.

== Environment ==
Most of Maenan's meadow land forms part of the Afon Conwy flood plain. Several times during the year, significant amounts of land is flooded.

== Viewpoint ==
Views of the Conwy Valley (Welsh: Dyffryn Conwy) can be seen from Maenan from Cadair Ifan Goch. Legend states that this viewpoint was the chair of the giant Ifan Goch, and it is currently owned by the National Trust. The path up to the viewpoint crosses through a privately owned woodland being managed as a nature reserve. The Arenig mountains can also be seen to the south.

== See also ==
- Llanddoged and Maenan
