= Batterie de cuisine =

Tools used in a kitchen

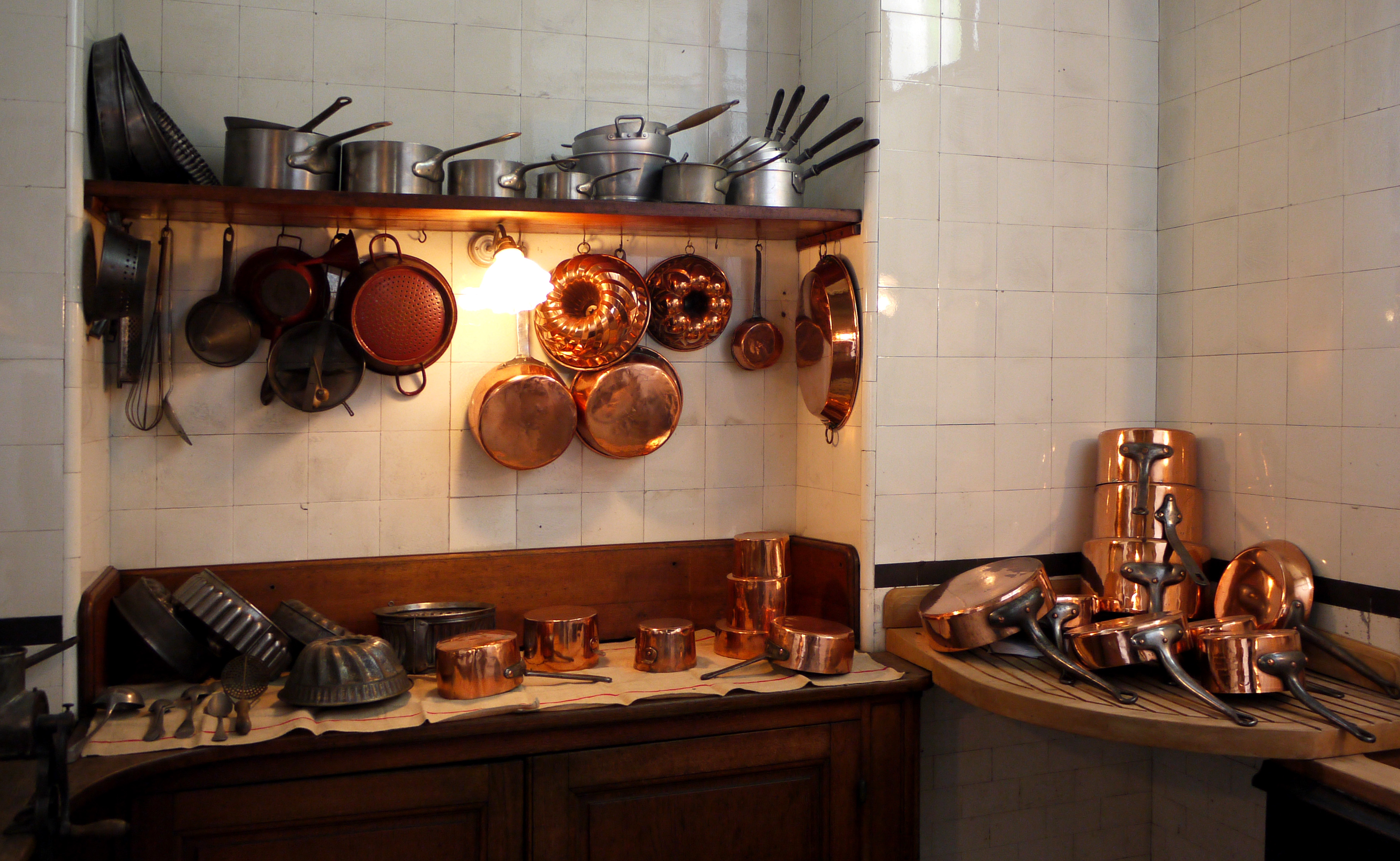
Exhibit of a batterie de cuisine at the Musée Cernuschi in Paris

Illustrations of some items of a batterie de cuisine, from Urbain Dubois' La cuisine de tous les pays, 1899

The batterie de cuisine (French; literally, kitchen artillery, i.e., kitchenware) is the range of tools and pans used in a kitchen. Although the term is French it is used in English to mean the same. It includes the knives, frying pans, bakeware and kitchen utensils required for cooking and for making desserts, pastries and confectionery. It does not include any of the fixed equipment such as cooking ranges, refrigeration equipment, etc.

In French Provincial Cooking (1960), Elizabeth David gives a list of typical items in a batterie de cusine:

French name	English
Bain-marie	Double-boiler
Balance	Scales
Bassin	Copper bowl in which to beat egg whites
Bassine à friture	Deep fryer
Batte	Cutlet bat
Bocal	Preserving jar
Bouilloire	Kettle
Braisère, Dauière	Braising pan
Brise-flamme	"Flame-breaker" – mat (originally asbestos) to go over the direct heat of the hob, enabling very slow cooking
Casserole	In traditional French usage, a saucepan; in English usage, an earthenware or other dish for slow cooking in the oven
Cercle à flan	Flan ring
Chasse-noyau	Olive or cherry stoner
Chinois	Conical sieve
Cocotte	Round or oval pot, especially the small type in which eggs are baked for œufs en cocotte
Couperet	Cleaver
Couteau de cuisine	Cook's general-purpose knife
Couteau à découper	Carving knife
Couteau à désosser	Boning knife
Couteau économe	Potato peeler
Couteau à filets de sole	Filleting knife
Couteau d'office	Vegetable or paring knife
Couteau tranche-lard	Long slicing knife
Cuiller à bouche	Tablespoon
Cuiller à pot	Small ladle
Écumoire	Skimmer
Entonnoir	Funnel
Etamine	Tamis cloth for straining consommé etc.
Faiselle	Basket or earthenware pot with holes for draining soft cheeses
Fouet	Whisk
Fusil	Steel for sharpening knives
Glacière à sucre	Sugar caster
Grille	Wire pastry rock, or frying basket
Hachinette	Small solid wooden bowl with crescent-shaped chopping knife for chopping small quantities of herbs, shallots, etc.
Hachoir	Chopping knife, usually crescent-shaped, single, double, or multi-bladed and double-handled
Lardoire	Larding needle
Lèchefrite	The tin or dish placed underneath food while it is roasting, to catch the juices and fat
Louche	Soup ladle or dipper
Mandoline	Narrow rectangular wooden or plastic board with adjustable cutting blades for slicing vegetables
Marmite	Deep, usually straight-sided pot
Mortier	Mortar, used with a pestle
Moule à charlotte	Plain metal mould with sloping sides
Moule à dariole	Small mould approximately the shape of a castle pudding
Moule à douille	Ring mould
Moule à pâté	Hinged round or oval open mould for pâtés cooked in pastry
Mouli-légumes	Vegetable mill
Moulin à café	Coffee grinder
Moulin à poivre	Pepper mill
Mouvette	Wooden spoon
Panier à friture	Wire basket for deep frying
Panier à salade	Wire salad basket for shaking salad dry after washing
Passoire	Sieve, colander
Pilon	Pestle
Plafond	Shallow rectangular baking or roasting tin or baking sheet
Planche à découper	Carving board
Planche à hacher	Chopping board
Planche à pâtisserie	Pastry board
Plaque à pâtisserie	Baking sheet
Plaque à rôtir	Shallow roasting tin
Plat à gratin	Shallow metal or earthenware used for dishes to be gratinéed
Platine	Small roasting tin
Poêle à frire	Frying-pan
Poêle à crêpes	Small shallow frying-pan for pancakes
Poêle à friture	Deep-frying pan
Poêle à œufs	Small metal or earthenware dish in which eggs are cooked and served
Poêle à omelettes	Omelette pan
Poêlon	Small earthenware or metal frying or sauté pan with a handle; deeper than an ordinary frying-pan
Poélon à sucre	Sugar-boiling pan
Poissonnière	Fish kettle
Ramequin	Ramekin
Ravier	Shallow china dish for hors-d'oeuvre
Rondin	Round stew-pan with two handles and a tight-fitting lid. Also called a fait-tout
Rouleau	Rolling pin
Saladier	Salad bowl
Salamandre	Round iron utensil with a long handle, now rare. Also a grill with the heat coming down rather than up.
Sauteuse	Heavy and shallow straight-sided pan with a handle, for shallow frying.
Sautoir	Similar to a sauteuse
Soupière	Soup tureen
Spatule	Spatula or palette knife
Tamis de crin	Fine sieve
Terrine	Earthenware cooking pot, usually earthenware
Timbale	Round mould with straight or slightly sloping sides
Timbale à soufflé	Soufflé dish
Tourtière	Shallow tart tin, often with removable base
Tranchoir	Trencher or wooden carving platter
Vasque	Shallow crystal silver or china bowl for the elegant presentation of fruit, sweet dishes etc.
Verge	Egg whisk

Other kitchen implements used by French, English, American and Canadian cooks and food writers include:

Implement	Ref
Baba and sponge-cake moulds	
Bulb baster	
Cheese grater	
Corkscrew (tire-bouchon)	
Crimpers (for pressing designs into soft sugar paste)	
Garlic press	
Ice-cream scoop (cuillère à glace)	
Jelly and charlotte moulds	
Lemon zester (zesteur)	
Measuring jug (doseur)	
Meat saws	
Melon/potato baller (cuillère à melon/à pomme parisienne)	
Moulin moulinette	
Pasta machine (machine à pâtes)	
Piping bags	
Pastry brushes	
Pie-moulds for raised pies	
Poultry shears	
Pudding-cloths	
Rubber spatulas	
Scissors	
Spoon drainers	
Steamer	
Stock-pots	
Trivets	
Turbot-kettle (turbotière)	
Wok	

== Sources ==
- Beck, Simone; Louisette Bertholle; Julia Child (2012) [1961]. Mastering the Art of French Cooking, Volume One. London: Particular. ISBN 978-0-241-95339-6.
- Beeton, Isabella (1991). Bridget Jones (ed.). Traditional Cake Decorating. London: Ward Lock. ISBN 0-70-636998-X.
- Conran, Caroline (1998). Le Conran gastronomique. Paris: Gründ. ISBN 270006447X.
- David, Elizabeth (2008) [1960]. French Provincial Cooking. London: Folio Society. OCLC 809349711.
- Ducasse, Alain (2013). Cuisine bon marché. Paris: Ducasse.
- Franklin, Linda Campbell (2003). 300 Years of Kitchen Collectibles. Iowa: Krause. ISBN 9780873493659.
- Hom, Ken (2005). Wok & Co. London: Hachette. OCLC 1311137561.
- Martin, Guy (2010). Les cuissons indispensables. Paris: Minerva. ISBN 978-2-83-071222-3.
- Paré, Jean (1999). Grands succès: trempettes tartinades et sauces à salade. Edmonton: Recipe Factory.
- Smith, Delia (1989). Delia Smith's Complete Illustrated Cookery Course. London: BBC Books. ISBN 0-56-321454-6.
- Soyer, Alexis (1846). The Gastronomic Regenerator. London: Simpkin, Marshall & Co. OCLC 1156372451.
