= Dornix =

Wool and linen fabric

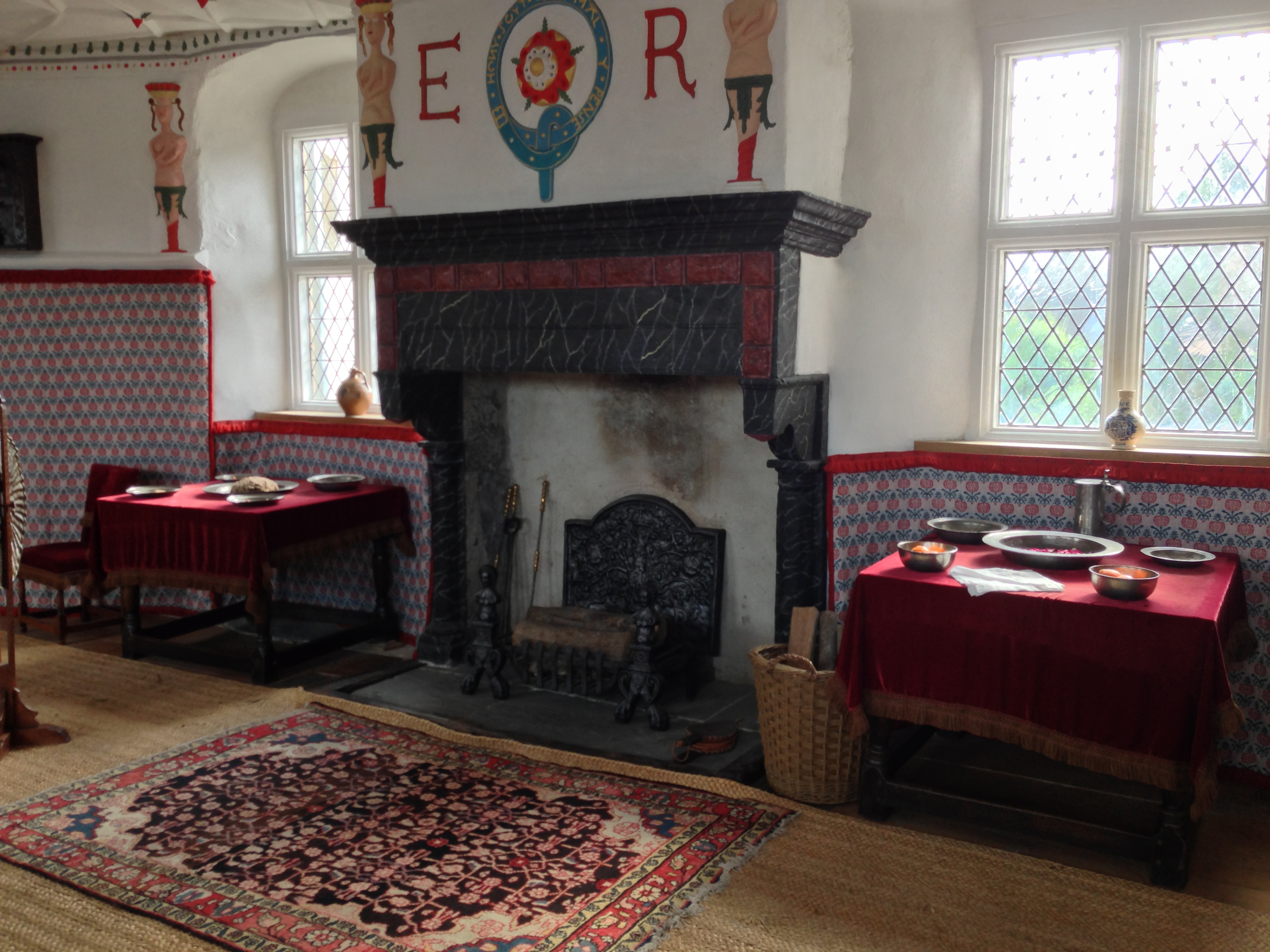
Room at Plas Mawr, the walls hung with reproduction Dornix

Dornix, also known as dornicks and darnacle, is name used for woollen and linen fabrics, first used in the 16th century.

== Woollen dornix ==
Dornix originated in the Belgian town of Tournai (Doornik in Flemish) in the 15th century and was made from a combination of wool and linen. It was a coarse cloth, similar to kersey, and used on beds, hangings, curtains and similar purposes. It was popular in middle-class English homes in the 15th century. Manufacture spread to the Flemish town of Lille, and to Norwich in England, where substantial manufacture continued until the 18th century.

== Dornick linens ==
Dornick (also spelled dornock Dornec or Darnec) was a strong linen damask used for table cloth, wall hangings, etc. Dornick also originated at Tournai. A similar fabric was Dorrock; the names Dornock and Dorrock are associated with Scotland.

Scottish accounts mention a variety of Dornick linens, available in different qualities. "Diaper dornick", "fine Scottish dornick", "Scottish narrow dornick", and "Dunfermline dornick" linens for table cloths and napkins were supplied to the Master of King's Pantry for James VI and I in the 1590s. Dornix or Dornick table linens were made in a number of Scottish centres, especially at Dunfermline. The association of the word with the name of the town Dornoch is erroneous. Around the year 1600, Dornick linens were imported to Kirkcaldy from the Low Countries, in narrow and broad weaves and in lengths of "Dutch measure".

== Bibliography ==
- Humphries, Peter (2006). "Heritage Interpretation and Cadw". In Hems, Alison; Blockley, Marion (eds.). Heritage Interpretation. Abingdon, UK: Routledge. pp. 71–82. ISBN 9780415237963.
- Kerridge, Eric (1985). Textile Manufactures in Early Modern England. Manchester, UK: Manchester University Press. ISBN 978-0-7190-2632-4.
