= Robert Wynn (MP) =

Welsh member of parliament (died 1598)

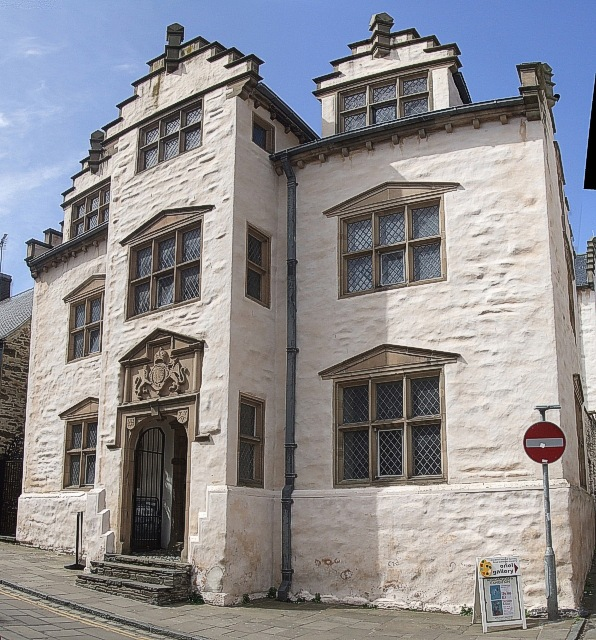
Robert Wynn's house, Plas Mawr, in Conwy

Robert Wynn (died 1598), known in his early life as Robert Gwyn, was a member of the Welsh gentry, known for constructing Plas Mawr in Conwy.

== Life ==
Robert came from a prosperous local family, being the 3rd son of John "Wynn" ap Maredudd, and entered the service of first Sir Walter Stonor and then Sir Philip Hoby, both administrators and senior officials to King Henry VIII. Robert fought and was injured at the Siege of Boulogne in 1544, took part in the King's Scottish campaigns and traveled extensively across Europe. He invested in land across North Wales and married his first wife, Dorothy Griffith, a member of the local gentry and a widow with five children in 1570. Robert now needed a suitable family house and chose Conwy, a prosperous town that was known in the 16th century for its gentile society. He built the house of Plas Mawr there between 1576 and 1585.

By the 1570s Robert began to rise in local society, becoming a justice of the peace, the MP for Caernarvonshire in 1589 and the county sheriff in 1590–91. Dorothy died in 1586 and in 1588 he remarried to Dorothy Dymock, with whom he had seven children - Katherine, John, Margaret, Elen, Sydney, Thomas and Mary - in only six years. His income rose considerably, from around £110 a year during the 1570s, to around £220 in the 1590s. According to the antiquarian John Wynn, Robert Wynn kept a "worthy plentiful house".

== Death ==
Robert died in 1598 and was buried by the altar of the Church of St Mary & All Saints, Conwy, of which he was a benefactor. He left a complex will intended to provide support for his wife and enable his daughters and youngest son to be successfully married; his instruction envisaged this being achieved by saving up money from his estates over the coming years, under the direction of the executor, Sir Roger Mostyn. Arguments followed, resulting in a protracted law case that was not resolved until 1630.

== Bibliography ==
- Turner, Rick C. (1995). "Robert Wynn and the Building of Plas Mawr, Conwy". National Library of Wales Journal. 29 (2): 177–209.
- Turner, Rick C. (2008). Plas Mawr, Conwy (Revised ed.). Cardiff, UK: Cadw. ISBN 9781857602425.
