= Maenan Hall =

Hall house near Llanddoged, Conwy, Wales

Coordinates: 53.168764°N 3.805229°W

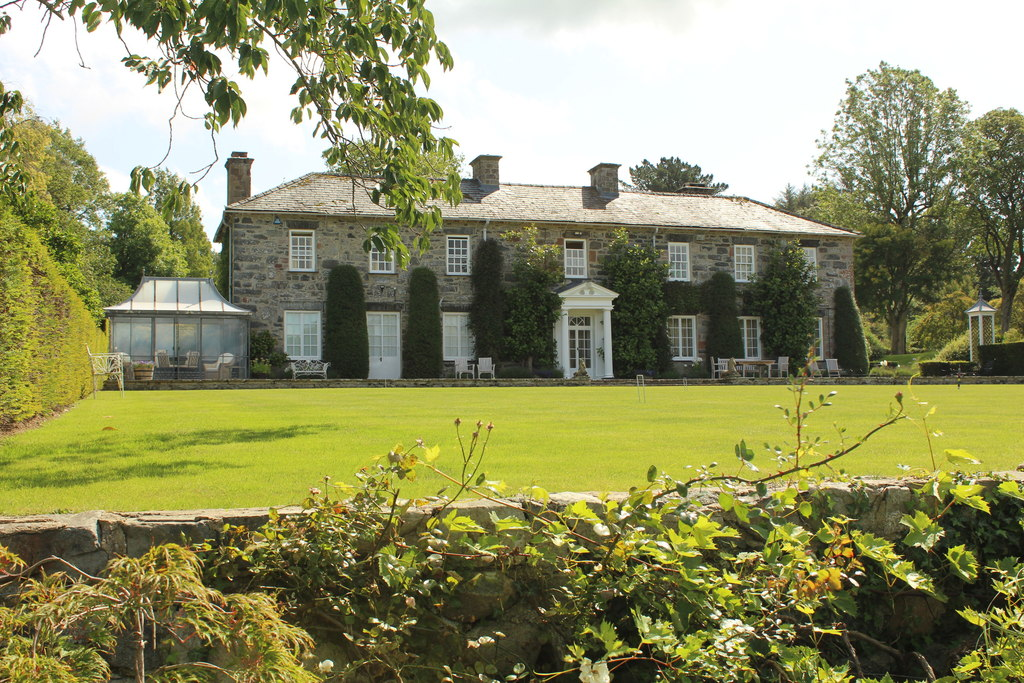

Maenan Hall is a Grade I-listed hall house north west of the village of Llanddoged, Conwy, Wales. This late medieval country mansion has fine decorative plasterwork and was the home of the Kyffin family. It is privately owned, but the extensive gardens are open to the public on a few occasions each year.

== History ==
=== Etymology ===
The name Maenan means 'place of the big stone' in Welsh. There have been three reasons as to why the hall was given this name: near to its current driveway there is a large outcrop of rock which was possibly a description of the hall. A large number of dolmens exist in the Conwy valley; the valley has many glacial boulders and its suggested the hall was given its current name because of the large amount of stones in the valley. In the 1841 census the house was listed as Maenan; it first became known as Meanan House by the time of the 1881 census but reverted to Maenan by 1891. Its name was recorded as Maenan Farm in the 1901 census.

=== Medieval to present day ===
The original timber frame design of the house included six bays which had a central entrance and wooden ionic portico which dated to the late 15th century. The house was the seat of the Kyffin family. In 1582 Maurice Kyffin, the High Sheriff of Caernarvonshire, altered and expanded the building; Kyffin encased the building's walls in rubble. Henry McLaren, 2nd Baron Aberconway brought Maenan Hall in late 1945 and started repairs to the building which had not been maintained for several decades. Aberconway brought the estate for his wife, Christabel, as a dower house. He died in 1953 and farmer Lewis Lloyd Williams along his family moved into the nearby Byrn Rhudd house.

Expansive restoration took place around 1955 which was carried out by S. Colwyn-Ffoulkes, an architect from Colwyn Bay. A small conservatory, designed by Clough Williams-Ellis, was built in 1963 at the house's north corner. Christabel Aberconway, Henry McLaren's widow died in 1974 and the house was inherited by her son Christopher Melville McLaren who remains the present owner; McLaren built a second conservatory at the building's south west section in 1990. Maenan Hall is currently protected as a Grade I listed building; this status was conferred on the hall on 17 March 1953.

== House and garden ==
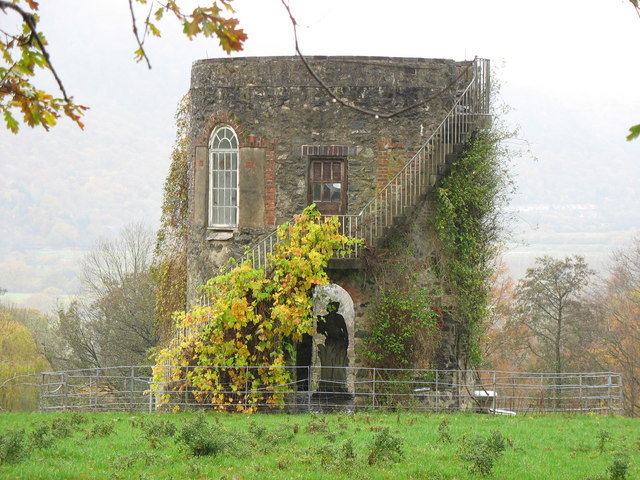
Folly in the grounds of Maenan Hall

Maenan Hall is a fine example of a late medieval dwelling house. It was originally timber-framed and had a cruck-built central hall. It is a two-storeyed dwelling, built in the shape of a "T", and has a hipped slate roof and short chimneys. The rear facade has seven symmetrically placed windows. The ground floor has a main cross passage, post-and-panel decorated partitions and beamed ceilings, which probably date back to the sixteenth century. The Elizabethan decorative plasterwork is particularly noteworthy; it includes various heraldic badges and emblems, the initials of Queen Elizabeth I and also of Maurice Kyffin and his wife, and the year 1582 appears more than once. The badges and emblems are similar to those found on plasterwork in Plas Mawr, Conwy and the fragmentary plaster remains still to be seen at Gwydir Castle, Llanrwst, and indicates that the same craftsman was used in all three properties.

The gardens of some 4 hectares (10 acres) are on slightly sloping ground and surrounded by woods where bluebells flower in spring. They include lawns, formal beds, a rose garden, water gardens, mature trees and shrubs, and a folly. The grounds are open to the public for charity on certain dates, or parties may visit by special arrangement with the owners.
