= Plas Mawr =

Grade I listed building in Conwy, Wales

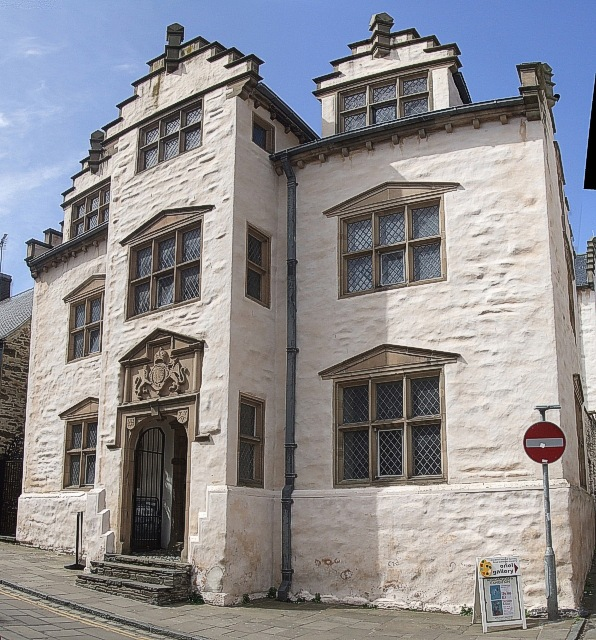
- The gatehouse of Plas Mawr, showing its characteristic Renaissance crow-stepped gables, pedimented windows and heraldry

- Located in Conwy
- 53.2811°N 3.8288°W
- Location: Conwy, Wales

History
- Built: 1576–85
- Built for: Robert Wynn

Site notes
- Restored: 1993–94
- Governing body: Cadw
- Website: Plas Mawr

Plas Mawr (Welsh for 'great hall') is an Elizabethan townhouse in Conwy, North Wales, dating from the 16th century. The property was built by Robert Wynn, a member of the local gentry, following his marriage to his first wife, Dorothy Griffith. Plas Mawr occupied a plot of land off Conwy's High Street and was constructed in three phases between 1576 and 1585 at a total cost of around £800. (Note: Converting 16th century sums of money into modern equivalents is highly challenging. For comparison, Robert Wynn was probably earning around £110 a year during the 1570s, and £220 by the 1590s.) Wynn was known for his hospitality, and the household was supported by Wynn's local dairy herds, orchards and gardens. On his death he laid out complex instructions for dividing his estate; the resulting law-case took years to resolve, effectively preventing the redevelopment of the house and preserving it in its original condition.

After 1683 Plas Mawr passed into the hands of the Mostyn family and ceased to be used as a family home. It was rented out for various purposes during the 18th and 19th centuries, including for use as a school, cheap lodgings and finally as the headquarters of the Royal Cambrian Academy of Art. In the 20th century the house became increasingly well known for its preserved Elizabethan architecture, but the costs of maintenance grew considerably and its condition deteriorated. The Welsh heritage agency Cadw took over the management of the property in 1993 and carried out an extensive, 42-month-long restoration project at a total cost of £3.3 million. With many of its rooms redecorated to resemble their condition in 1665, and replanted Renaissance gardens, it is now run as a tourist attraction.

Architecturally, Plas Mawr is almost unchanged from the 16th century, and the historian Rick Turner considers the house to be "the finest surviving town house of the Elizabethan era". Plas Mawr shows a blend of continental Renaissance and local North Wales influences, with an innovative floor-plan and architectural detailing. The house still retains much of its original plasterwork, which incorporates symbols, badges and heraldry, which the historian Peter Smith has described as "the most perfect and the most complete memorial to Elizabethan Wales." The architecture of the house influenced other contemporary projects in North Wales, and was later copied during the 19th and 20th centuries in buildings around the town of Conwy, including the local police station and nearby hotel.

== History ==
=== 16th–17th centuries ===
Plas Mawr was built in the town of Conwy between 1576 and 1585 by Robert Wynn. Robert came from a prosperous local family and entered the service of first Sir Walter Stonor and then Sir Philip Hoby, both administrators and senior officials to King Henry VIII. Robert fought and was injured at the siege of Boulogne in 1544, took part in military campaigns in Scotland and traveled extensively across Europe. He invested in land across North Wales and married his first wife, Dorothy Griffith, a member of the local gentry, in 1570. Once married, Robert needed a suitable house and chose to settle in Conwy, a prosperous town that was known in the 16th century for its genteel society.

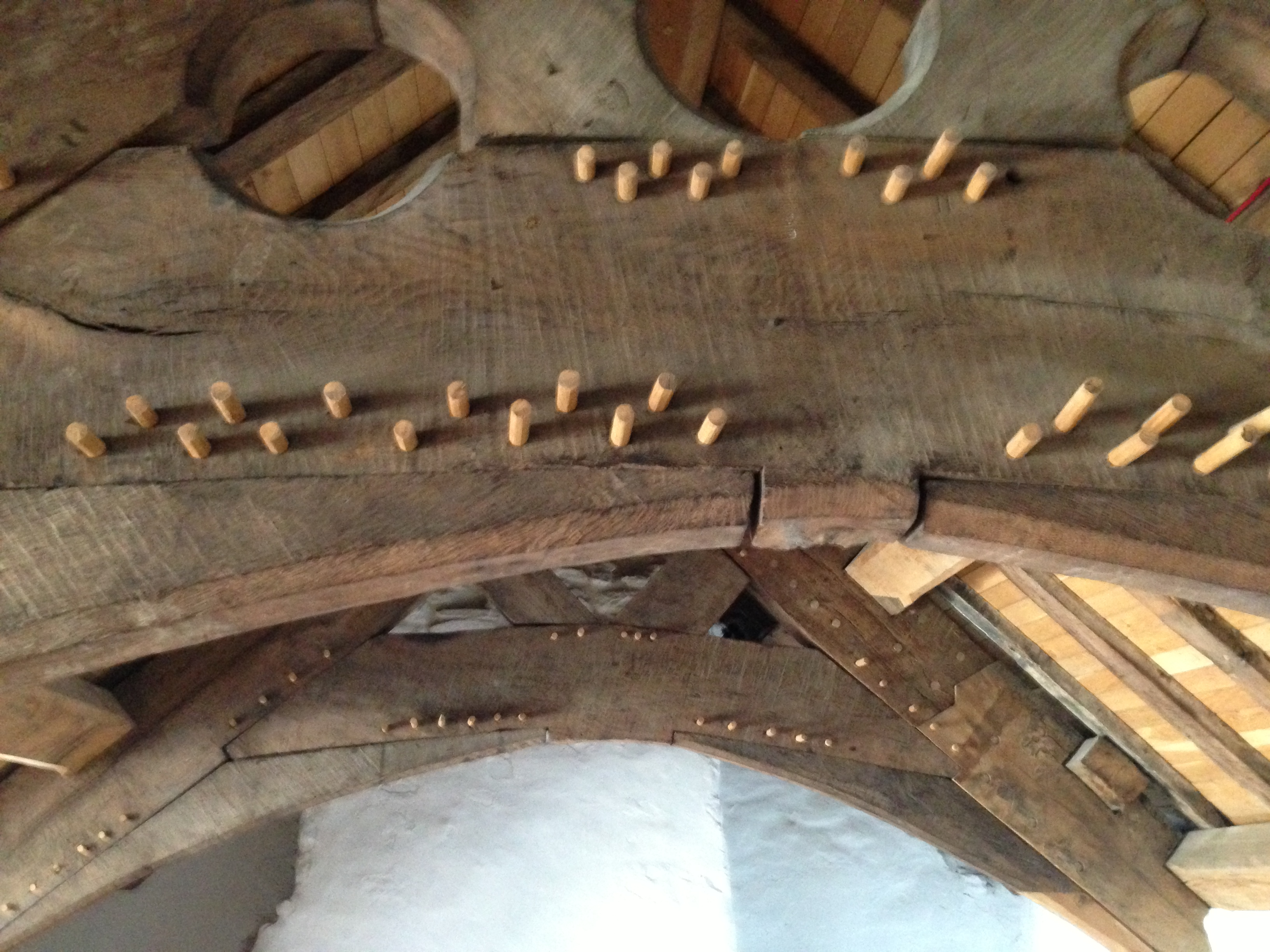
The roof above the great chamber, with arch-braced collar trusses joined using "double pegging"

In 1570, Robert paid Hugh Mershe £200 for an existing "mansion house" in Conwy, positioned in the middle of a burgage plot on what is now Crown Lane. More land to the north of this was purchased from a Richard Peake in 1576 for £40, and work then began on the north wing of Plas Mawr, which was completed by the following year. Mershe's former house was pulled down to allow the preparation of the foundations of the rest of the building, including the digging of fresh drains. Robert lived in the completed north wing until 1580, when the central and south ranges were built, finishing the main part of Plas Mawr.

Robert went on to rent further land around the north of Plas Mawr. The land at the south end of the burgage, however, facing onto the High Street, belonged to a Robert Laythwood, who had a house there. Wynne purchased this in 1585, probably for the relatively high price of £40, and demolished it to enable the final phase of development, using the space to build a gatehouse that formed the new entrance to Plas Mawr. Further small pieces of land were bought on the north-west side of the house and converted into an ornamental garden, bringing the total cost of the land to around £300. The result was the grandest Elizabethan town house in Wales at the time.

These three phases of house construction – 1576–77, 1580 and 1585 – were probably overseen by several different senior craftsmen, possibly working to an original plan determined by a surveyor or mason working at the English royal court. Judging by the details of the roof design, a single master carpenter may have been used for all three parts of the build; he probably worked elsewhere across the region during these years, including on 15 other houses and two churches. Both of the first two phases of work were probably conducted by the same team of plasterers, possibly from London, and they used as much as 100,000-kilogram (220,000 lb) of lime plaster on the rendering. Timber and slates were brought down the Conwy valley for the house, with grey Silurian grit rubble quarried from the hills near the town, and finer sandstone brought from nearby Deganwy. The total of the building work was probably around £500.

Entertainment and hospitality were important to a gentleman's 16th-century social status and, according to his nephew, the antiquarian John Wynn, Robert Wynn kept a "worthy plentiful house". The household was supported by milk from Wynn's own dairy herds, and by food from the orchards, gardens and a fish trap that he owned around the town. The house had its own brewing, baking and dairy facilities, and further supplies were bought in from regional merchants.

Dorothy died in 1586 and Robert married Dorothy Dymock, with whom he had seven children at Plas Mawr. When Robert died in 1598 he left a complex will that led to legal disputes between the family and the executor, Sir Roger Mostyn. The legal case effectively halted any further development of the house, by now the most prominent in Conwy, until its resolution in 1630. The property passed to Robert's grandson, another Robert Wynn, in 1637, and onto his daughter, Elin in 1683. By 1665, the house was equipped to a quality and style that would have put it only just behind the houses of the major gentry families in Caernarfonshire. Elin then married into the Wynne family, and made little use of the house, and it ultimately passed by marriage into the Mostyn family.

=== 18th–19th centuries ===
The Mostyns' principal residence was Mostyn Hall in Flintshire and so the family rented out Plas Mawr to various tenants during the 18th and 19th centuries. In the 18th century the gatehouse was used as a courthouse and the main house as cheap housing. In the 19th century, parts of the house were converted into a school and space for other small businesses, as well as still being used for domestic accommodation: in 1881, the house had 25 residents. Minor changes were made to Plas Mawr in the process, such as the installation of partition walls to subdivide the larger rooms, but it remained largely intact. The Mostyns offered the house for sale in 1870, as part of a package of land including Bodysgallen Hall, but there were no offers.

By the 1880s, the Royal Cambrian Academy of Art became concerned about the condition of Plas Mawr, and in 1887 Lord Mostyn agreed to lease the building to the Academy for use as their headquarters. The architects Arthur and Herbert Baker were commissioned to survey the building, conduct repairs and remove some of the post-17th century alterations, and J. R. Furness then carried out conservation work on much of the plasterwork. The Victoria Gallery was built onto the north-west side of the house to hold artistic exhibitions, and a weather vane was added to the top of the building to celebrate Queen Victoria's Diamond Jubilee.

=== 20th–21st centuries ===
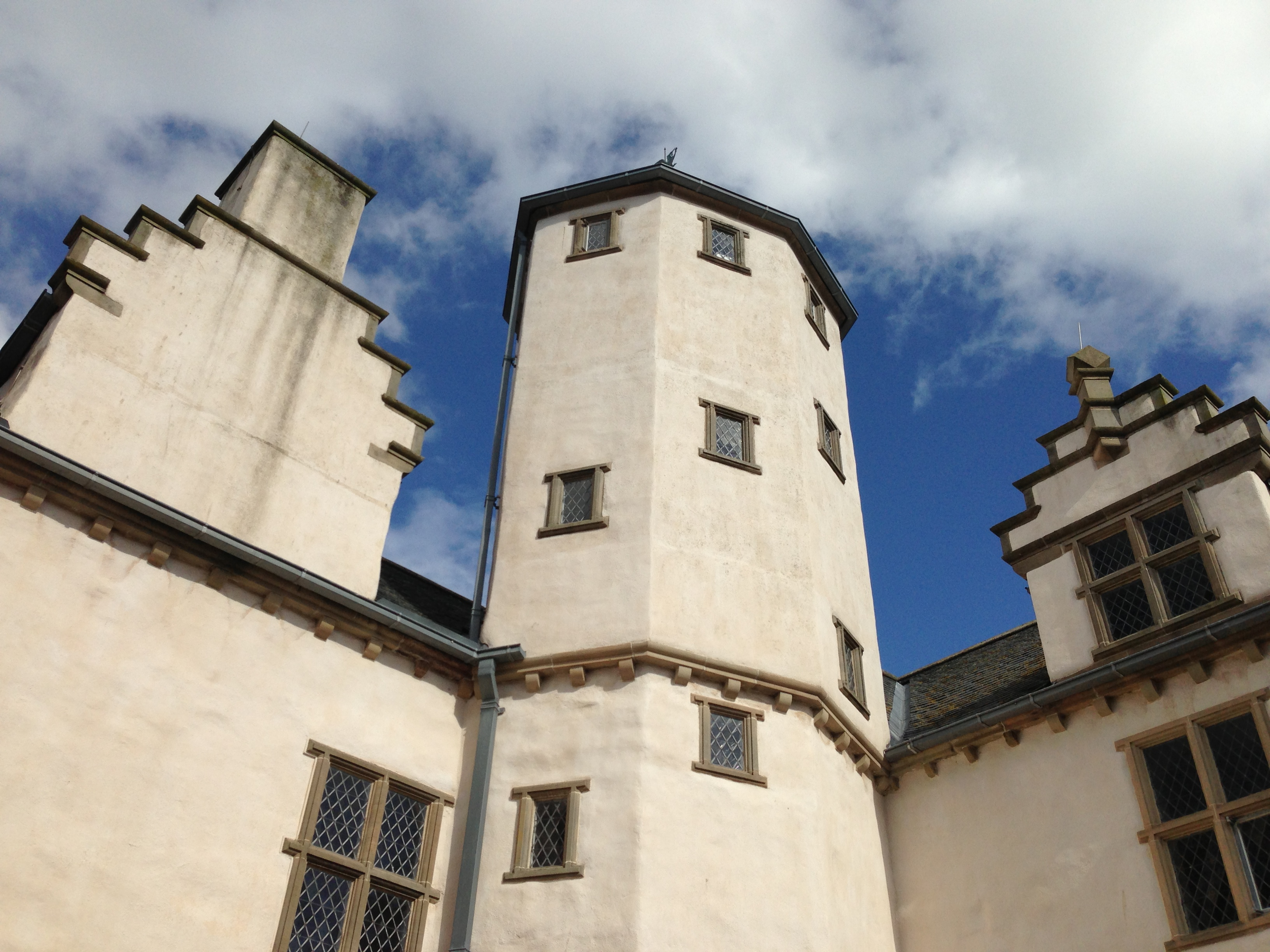
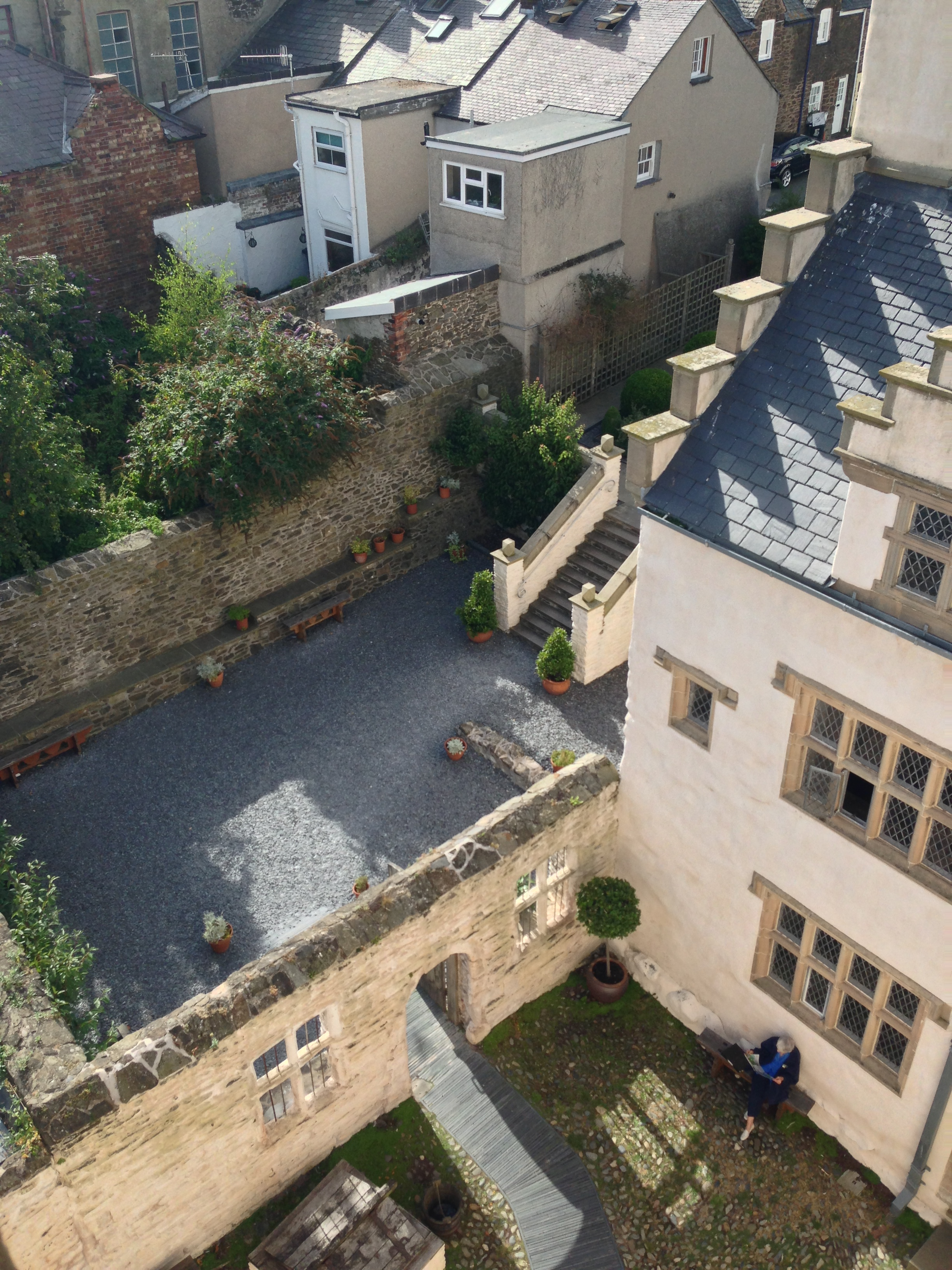
Central tower (left) and view from the tower onto the lower terrace, upper courtyard and the north wing (right)

By the early 20th century, Plas Mawr's historical significance was increasingly well understood, but the costs of maintaining the house grew considerably. By the middle of the century, the finer sandstone had corroded and the timber beams were deteriorating; a 1956 survey described them as "much decayed". The plaster ceilings were bowing and coming away from their timbers. The Academy of Art sought government and private assistance to undertake temporary and partial repairs, but these were insufficient and in 1993 it moved into new accommodation and the property was passed into the control of the state, under the management of the Welsh heritage agency Cadw.

Cadw carried out a major restoration project on the house over the next 42 months, combining large scale conservation with detailed surveying and archaeological analysis. The 19th-century Victoria Galley was demolished in 1995, and the bare, external stonework was re-rendered and lime washed. Large parts of the property were restored as they might have appeared in 1665, assisted by the record of Robert Wynn the younger's will, with the exception of the attic, which was restored to its probable 19th-century appearance. The intention of this was to emphasize the colour and comfort of the original building, to prevent it appearing inauthentically bleak and austere. The Great Chamber is available for wedding ceremonies. Other sections of the house were redeveloped to hold exhibition displays and other visitor facilities.

The restoration included installing original and replica interior furnishings, using wall hangings woven from Kidderminster stuff and Dornix. In what historical consultant Charles Kightly has praised as a "brave and successful" decision, much of the plasterwork was repainted, using reversible techniques, to resemble its 17th-century condition. In total the project cost £3.3 million, and won the Royal Institution of Chartered Surveyors Building Conservation Award. Further work followed in 2006 to restore the gardens, again attempting to replicate the style prevalent in 1665.

In the 21st century the house is operated as a tourist attraction by Cadw. The historian Rick Turner considers Plas Mawr to be "the finest surviving town house of the Elizabethan era" and it is protected under UK law as a Grade I listed building and as a scheduled monument.

== Architecture ==
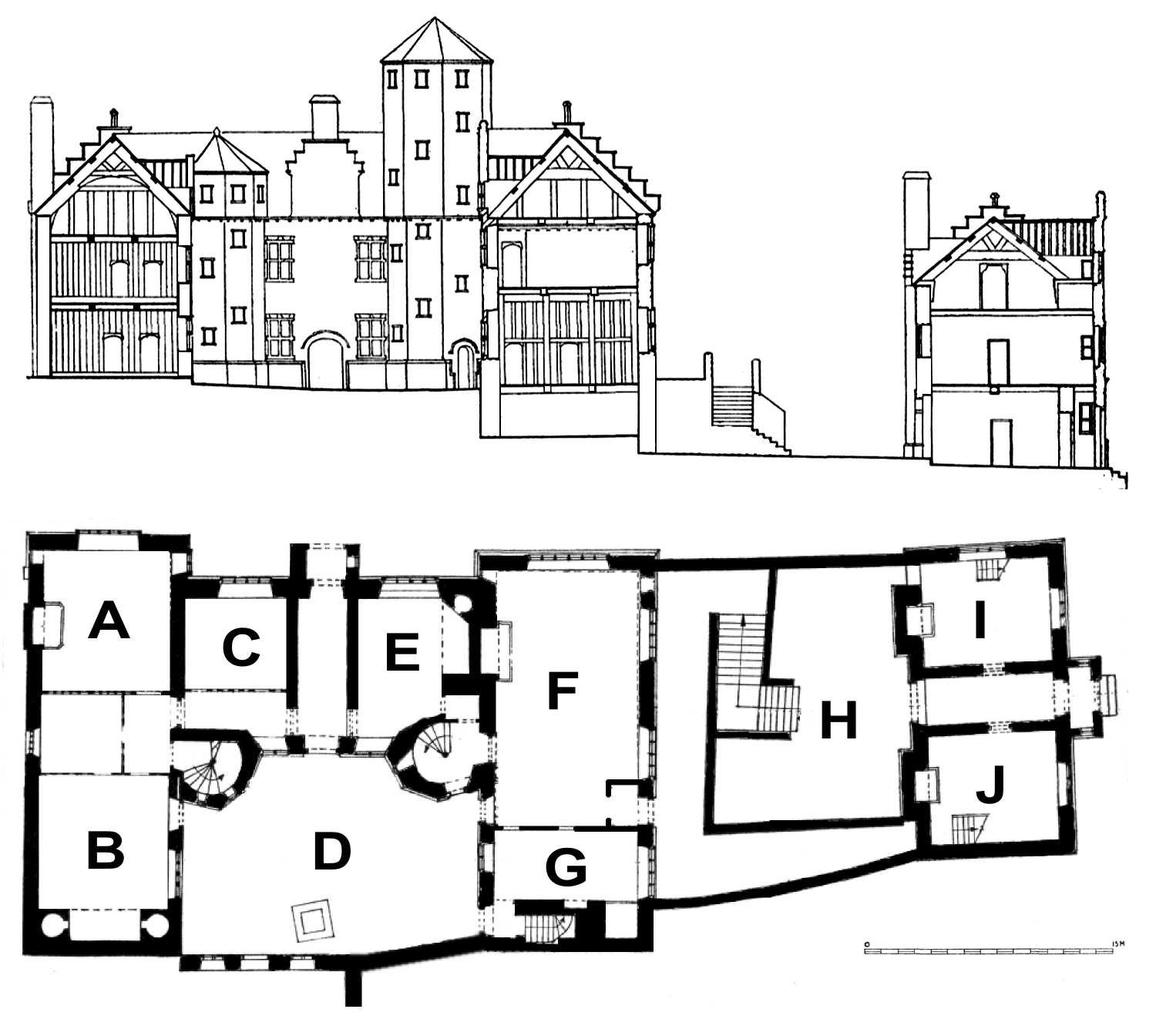
Cross-section and ground-floor plan of Plas Mawr: A – Parlour; B – Brewhouse; C – Pantry; D – Upper Courtyard; E – Kitchen; F – Hall; G – Buttery; H – Lower Courtyard; I and J – Gatehouse

=== Influences ===
Architecturally, Plas Mawr is almost unchanged from the 16th century, making it a very rare survival from this period. The architectural style is a product of the broader Renaissance influences prevalent across Europe at the time. Robert Wynn spent time in Germany, and the style of Plas Mawr makes use of North German Gothic themes, particularly in its use of symmetry, the pedimented windows at the front of the house, faceted finials and crow-stepped gables. These features were already popular in England when the house was built, and indeed Plas Mawr is very similar in design to Eastbury Manor House, the two possibly being based on the same architectural plan. Some of these features had already begun to spread into Wales – crow-stepped gables, for example, were already being used in Flintshire by the 1580s – but others were ground breaking in Wales, such as the use of ovolo-moulded and dormer windows. Nonetheless, Robert Wynn was only an emerging member of the gentry, and his house was not as large or as sophisticated as contemporary grander Renaissance properties built in larger rural settings.

Some of the house's architecture also reflects the influences from contemporary buildings across North Wales, in particular Gwydir Castle, built by Robert Wynn's father John. Plas Mawr lacks a fashionable long gallery, for example, which was popular in England at the time, and was already beginning to appear in Welsh houses. Instead, it has a rear turret, or belvedere, which is raised prominently above the height of the rest of the house, overlooking the town: this was a slightly antiquated feature, but was widely used in other Wynn family properties, including Bodysgallen Hall. The design of Plas Mawr influenced other buildings in North Wales at the time, including the redecoration of Gwydir Castle, Maenan Hall further up the Conwy valley, Plas Mawr in Caernarfon and Hen Blas in Beaumaris. It also later shaped the architecture of 19th- and 20th-century buildings in Conwy itself, surviving examples of which include the town's police station and the Castlebank Hotel.

=== Layout ===
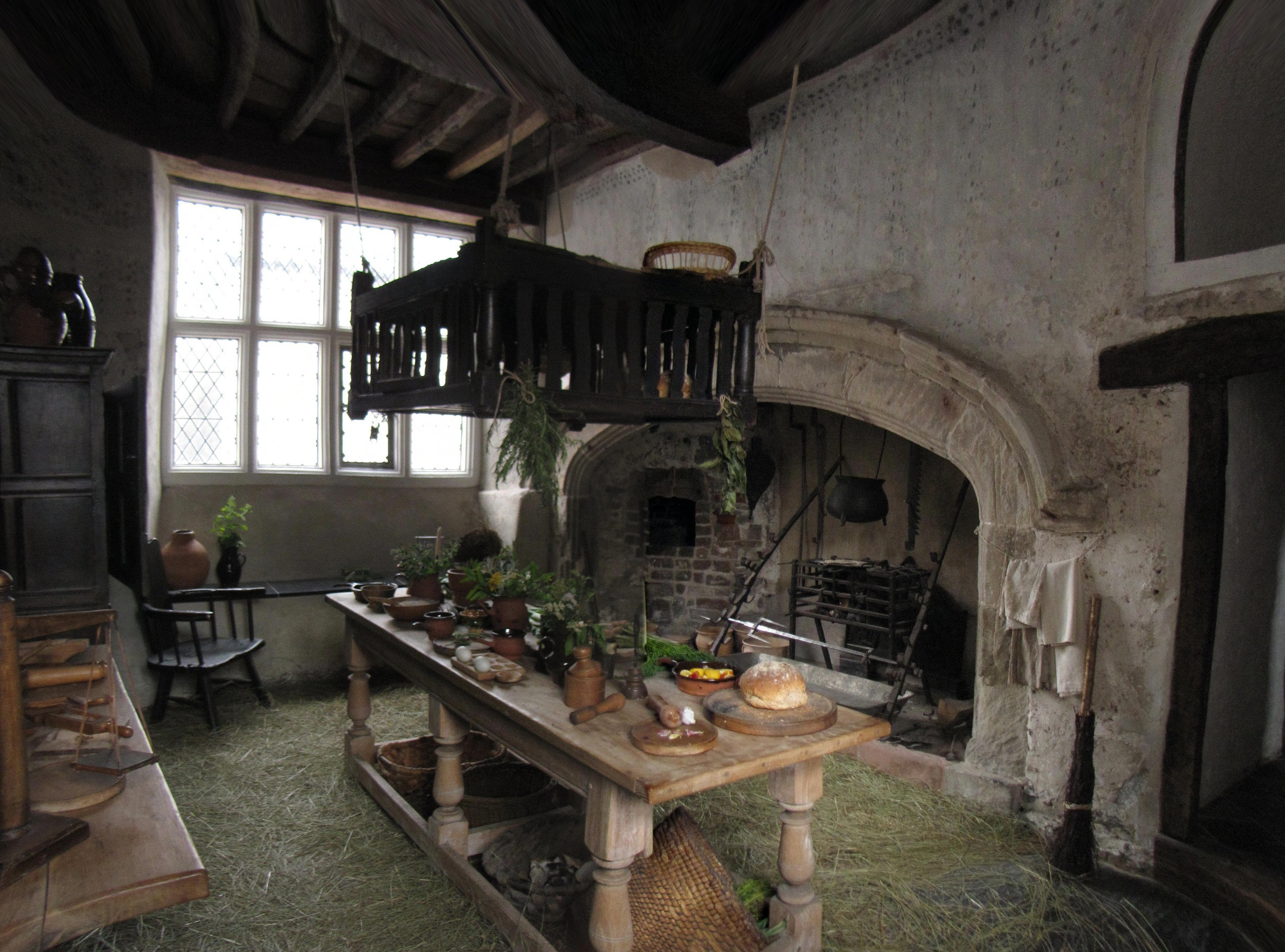
Restored kitchen and batterie de cuisine

Modern visitors typically enter the house from the High Street to the south, passing through the gatehouse, across the lower courtyard into the hall of the main building. Plas Mawr's gatehouse was only the third such entrance building to be built in North Wales, despite gatehouses being an important part of English Elizabethan architecture, designed to show off the house and provide a suitably dignified entry for visitors. Few houses in towns had the physical space for a gatehouse like Plas Mawr's. Originally, the gatehouse would have contained a suite of rooms for the steward of the house, Richard Wynn.

The main house forms an "H"-shape, with a north and a south wing joined in the middle, all facing onto an upper courtyard. The upper courtyard was key to the way that the main house functioned: it linked almost all the ground floor rooms in the house, as well as providing access to the cellars, and gave an impressive view of the turret towers. In the south wing was the hall and the buttery, with the red and white chambers above them. Probably when Plas Mawr was first built, and certainly by 1665, the hall would have been used to meet ordinary visitors and for servants' meals, rather than forming the main room of the house; the wooden benches and table on display are original to the property. Traditionally, the service rooms in houses had been placed at the far end of the main hall, but Plas Mawr departed from this design. The service area, including the kitchen and pantry, was instead placed in the centre of the building, between the parlour and the hall; this radical redesign was copied at nearby Hafod Lwyfog. The restored kitchen is equipped with a batterie de cuisine, with a combination of original and replica equipment.

Above these rooms was the great chamber, the main room which formed the ceremonial centre of the house. In the north wing was the brewhouse and the parlour, with two chambers above them, the latter possibly used by Dorothy Wynn as her bedroom. The private bedrooms for the family and guests were each equipped with a fireplace, an important status symbol in the period. The roof attics of the house contained a great deal of space for accommodating the household servants. The attic above the great chamber has a grand timber roof with arch-braced collar trusses, joined using an unusual system called "double pegging", which is only used in the Conwy valley during the late 16th century. It appears that the great chamber's ceiling was originally supposed to be open, looking up to the timbers with the trusses visible, but a mistake in the construction of the walls meant that one side of the chamber no longer fitted smoothly with the timbers, creating an ugly appearance; a plaster ceiling was then added to hide the error.

The gardens behind the house may originally have resembled the gardens at Bodysgallen Hall, which were laid out in the Renaissance style popular across Europe. The slope of the land results in Plas Mawr's gardens forming the upper and lower terraces, and these have been replanted and restored in an attempt to show them as they might have appeared in 1665. The summerhouse is based on a version shown in a contemporary painting of Llanerch's gardens, and the flowerpots are modeled on those found in excavations at Tredegar House.

=== Plasterwork ===
Seven rooms still possess elements of their original plasterwork, which the historian Peter Smith has described as "the most perfect and the most complete memorial to Elizabethan Wales", and their original wooden carved panels that line the walls. The plasterwork includes extensive heraldry, badges and symbols: in the upper north range alone, 22 different heraldic emblems are moulded into the ceilings and walls. The gatehouse shows the royal arms, as do the great chamber and the parlour, probably because they were intended to host senior guests. The badges of numerous monarchs are included throughout the house, including those of Richard II, Richard III, Henry IV and Henry VII. The badges of other prominent nobles, such as Robert Dudley, are also featured in the house.

The plasterwork in the parlour displays the arms of Robert Wynn himself, and Robert Wynn's bedchamber above the brewhouse shows the combined arms of the Wynn and Griffith families, which are generally given equal prominence throughout the house. Robert Wynn's arms are most prominent in the hall and the bedchambers, where the royal arms are smaller and less prominent. In the 16th century, Wynn's heraldry would probably have been echoed in the furnishings of the house, including the fabrics, cups and silverware. The plasterwork also incorporates a number of classical themes, but these are not as well executed as the badges and other emblems: the historian Rick Turner describes them as "rather token additions", and Smith considers this part of the decoration to be "naive".

Plasterwork

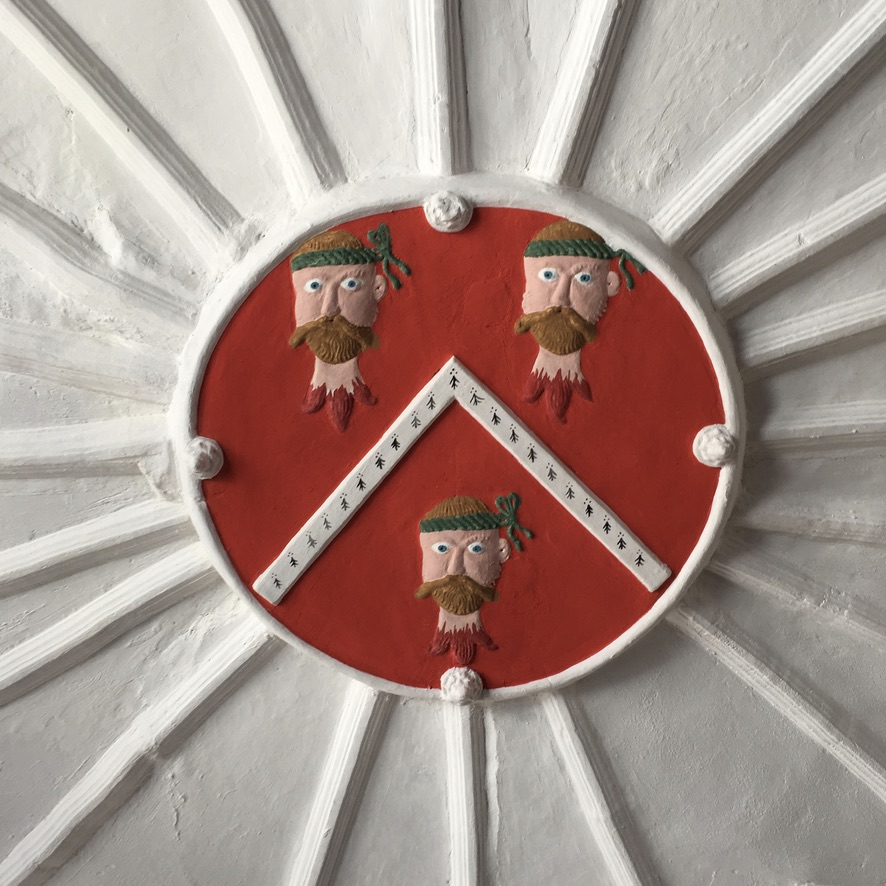
Part of the great chamber ceiling, showing the Griffith coat of arms

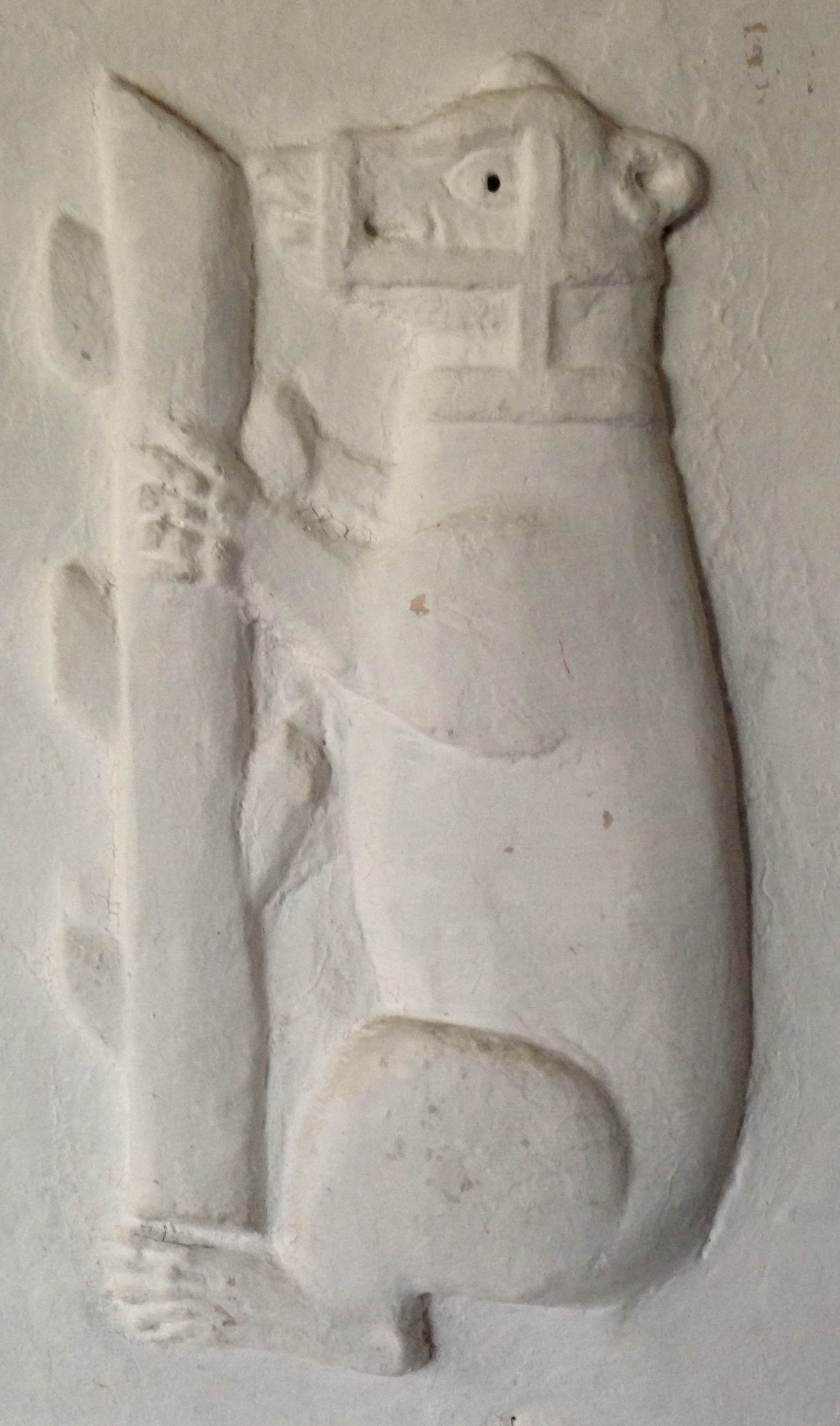
The bear and ragged staff, the symbol of the Earl of Leicester

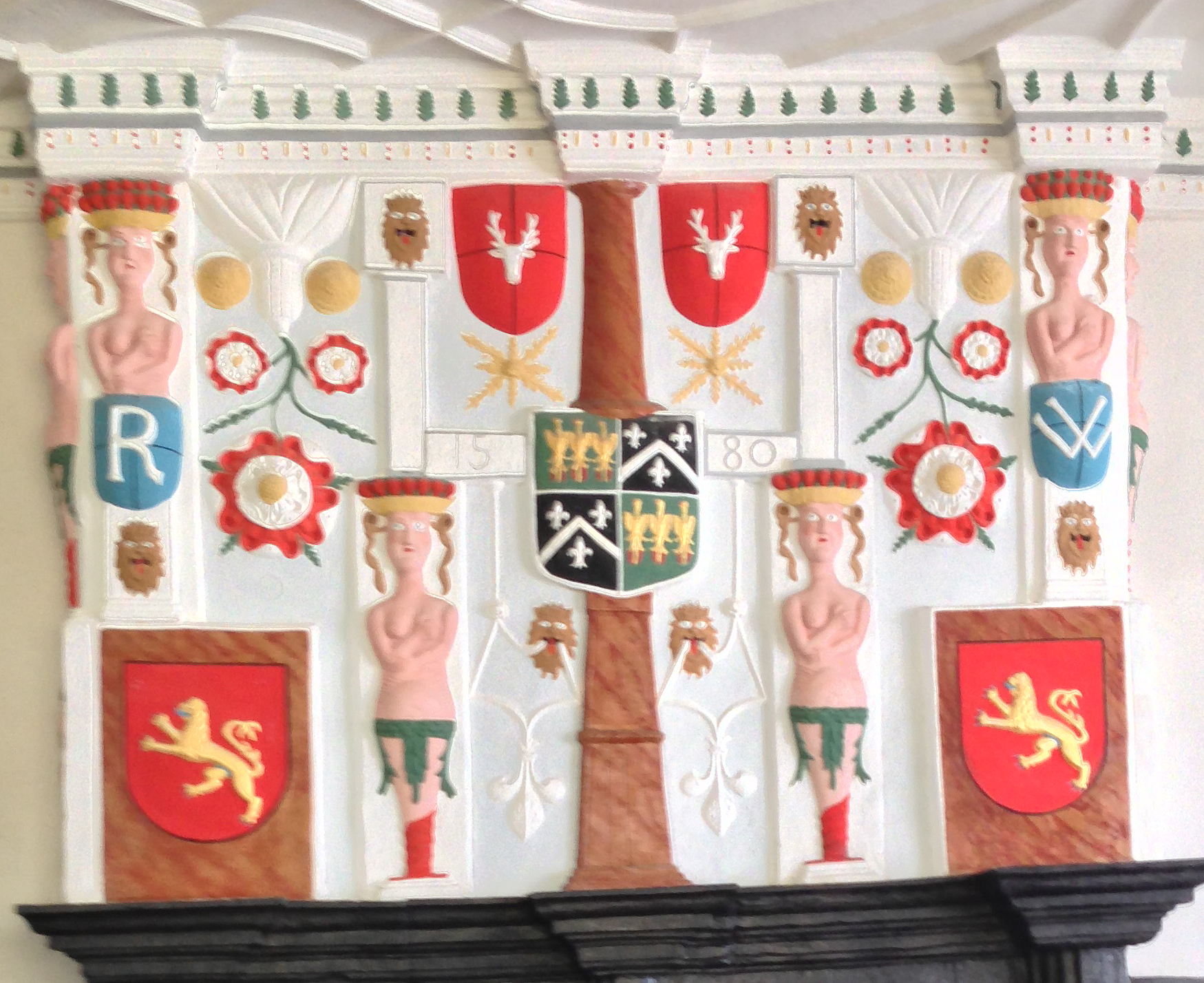
Fireplace in the hall, showing the quartered arms of the Wynn family, surrounded by badges and caryatids

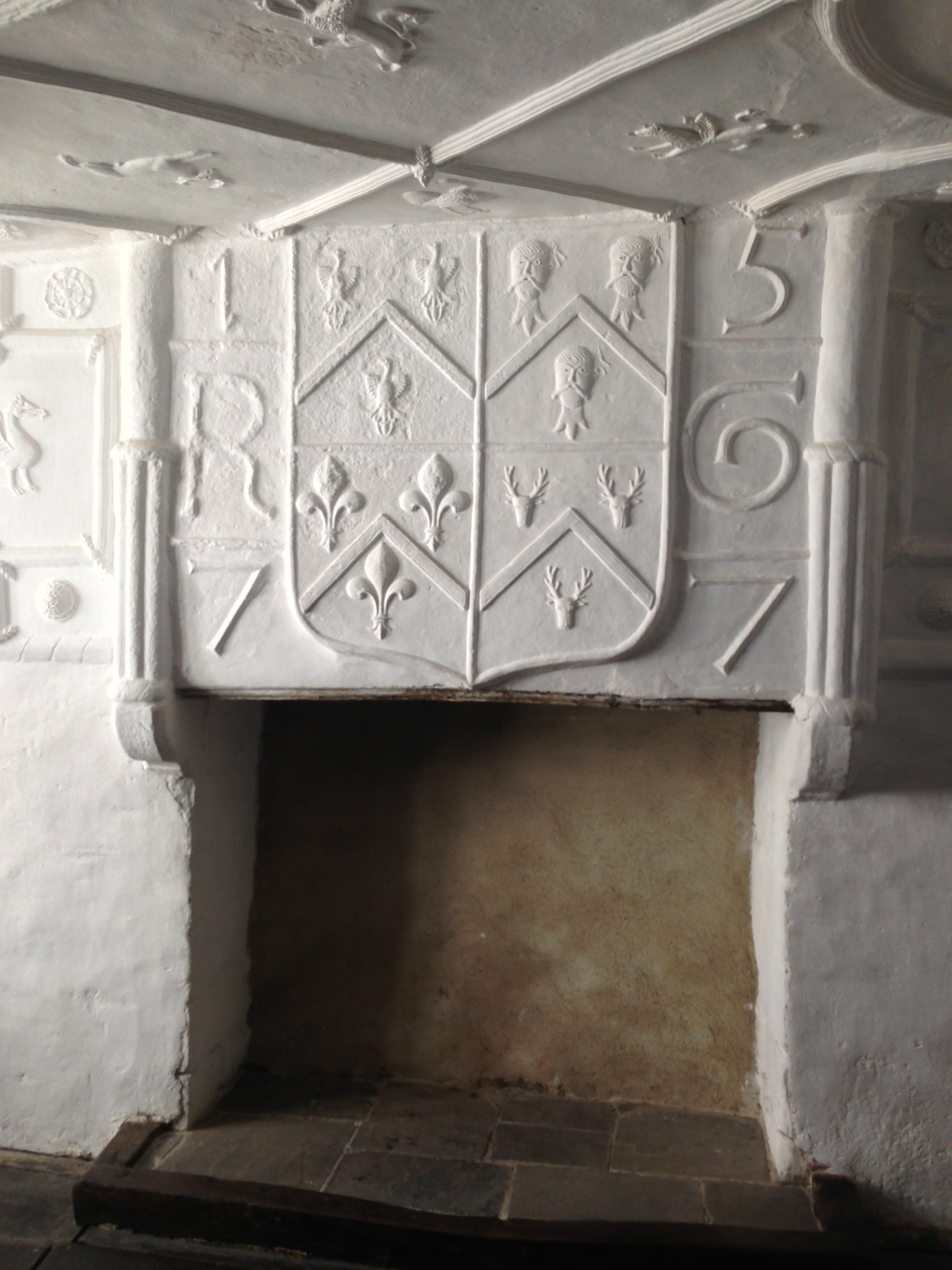
Fireplace in Robert Wynn's bedchamber, showing the Wynn and Griffith quartered arms in the plasterwork

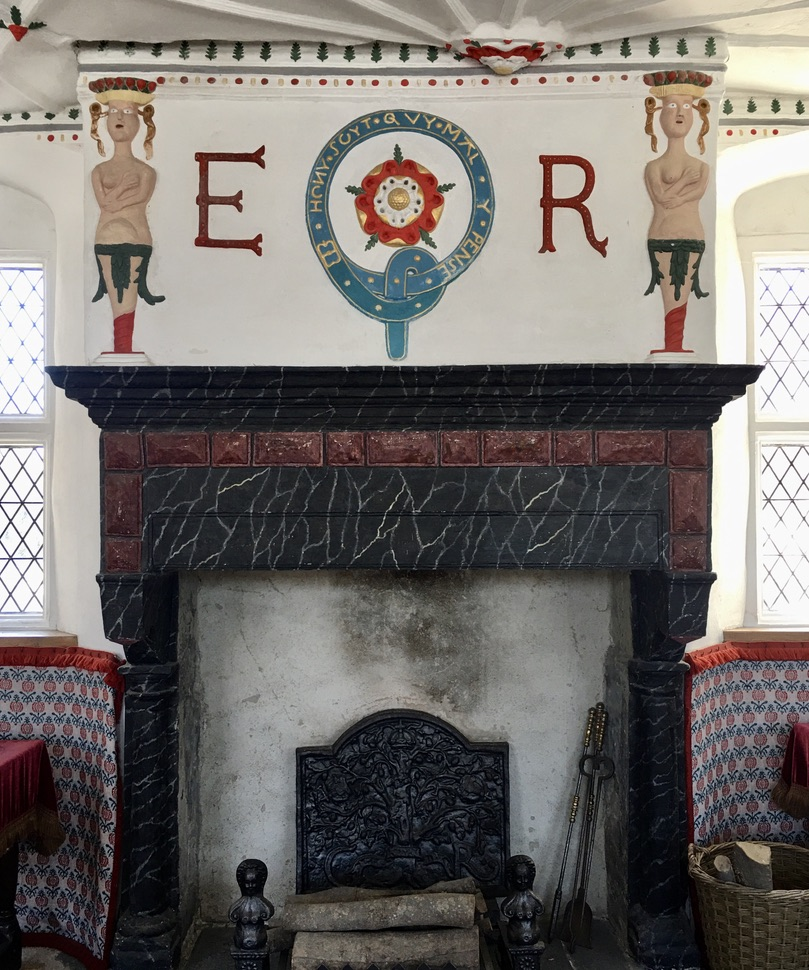
The great chamber fireplace, showing the Order of the Garter arms in the plasterwork, supported by caryatids

== See also ==
- Medieval Merchant's House
- Rothe House
- Barley Hall

== Bibliography ==
- Haslam, Richard (2006). "Bodysgallen: a Renaissance Garden Survival?". Garden History. 34 (1): 132–144.
- Humphries, Peter (2006). "Heritage Interpretation and Cadw". In Hems, Alison; Blockley, Marion (eds.). Heritage Interpretation. Abingdon, UK: Routledge. pp. 71–82. ISBN 9780415237963.
- Kightly, Charles (2008). "Interpretation, Entertainment, Involvement: Historic Site Presentation c. 1983–2008". Conservation Bulletin: A Bulletin of the Historic Environment (58): 25–27.
- Robinson, David M. (2008). "Understanding Historic Properties". Conservation Bulletin: A Bulletin of the Historic Environment (58): 8–10.
- Royal Commission on the Ancient and Historical Monuments of Wales (1956). An Inventory of the Ancient Monuments in Caernarvonshire. Vol. 1. London, UK: Her Majesty's Stationery Office. OCLC 703909588.
- Royal Commission on the Ancient and Historical Monuments of Wales (1964). An Inventory of the Ancient Monuments in Caernarvonshire. Vol. 3. London, UK: Her Majesty's Stationery Office. OCLC 703909595.
- Smith, Peter (1988). Houses of the Welsh Countryside: a Study in Historical Geography (2nd ed.). London, UK: The Royal Commission on Ancient and Historical Monuments in Wales. ISBN 9780113000128.
- Turner, Rick C. (1995). "Robert Wynn and the Building of Plas Mawr, Conwy". National Library of Wales Journal. 29 (2): 177–209.
- Turner, Rick C. (2008). Plas Mawr, Conwy (Revised ed.). Cardiff, UK: Cadw. ISBN 9781857602425.
