= Llanddoged =

Village in Conwy County Borough, Wales

Coordinates: 53.157°N 3.787°W

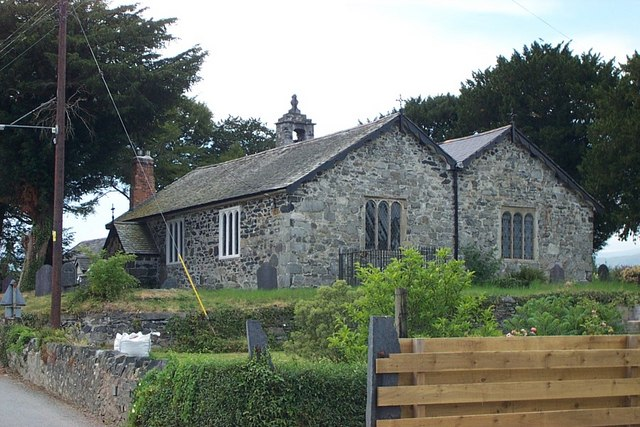
- Llanddoged Church

- Location within Conwy
- OS grid reference: SH806637
- Community: Llanddoged and Maenan
- Principal area: Conwy
- Country: Wales
- Sovereign state: United Kingdom
- Post town: LLANRWST
- Postcode district: LL26
- Dialling code: 01492
- Police: North Wales
- Fire: North Wales
- Ambulance: Welsh
- UK Parliament: Bangor Aberconwy
- Senedd Cymru – Welsh Parliament: Bangor Conwy Môn

Llanddoged is a small Welsh village which lies in the hills a little over a mile to the north of Llanrwst, in Conwy County Borough, Wales. The village itself has a small population, with a surrounding rural farming community. Most of the population are Welsh speakers. Llanddoged shares its community council with the rural community of Maenan. Llanddoged has two small hamlets attached to it - Groesffordd and Tan-lan. Groesffordd has a motor repair garage known as 'Garej Groesffordd'. Tan-lan was known for its notorious bends on the A470 where, before road improvements, many road traffic collisions had occurred. Tan-lan is also home to an Environment Agency Wales depot.

== Amenities ==
It has a primary school, Ysgol Llanddoged, and education is delivered through the medium of Welsh. Many of the children at the school are from Llanddoged or Maenan but some also from Llanrwst. The school hall also acts as a community centre. Several organisations such as 'Merched y Wawr' and the Women's Institute also meet here.

The village has views on the many walking paths and routes that circle it. There is also a small playground park and playing field, known as 'Cae Cetyn'.

The parish church is called Eglwys St Doged, after whom the village is named. The church is part of the diocese of St Asaph within the Church in Wales. After being made redundant, St Doged's church is now cared for by The Friends of Friendless Churches, who have carried out a programme of repairs to the fabric of this church.

== Ras Fawr Llanddoged ==
Every year the village is host to 'Ras fawr Llanddoged' (Welsh for: Llanddoged's Great Race). The race is run over 10 km, mostly uphill, course. Approximately 60 people race each year. The race was started by Arfon Jones, Ffrith Galed.

== History ==
St Doged's Church, set in a circular churchyard in Llanddoged, was rebuilt in 1839, but was originally a sixth-century martyrium constructed to shelter the grave of Saint Doged. It is Grade II* listed. Nearby, the waters of Saint Doged's Well were reputed to cure eye-disorders. The church is open to visitors and inside still has the original layout, with a large seating box for each wealthy family and seats for their servants behind. Some old house names can still be seen on the doors. The area across the aisle was provided for the villagers to use. The church also has three pews above each other, much like a chapel. The altar is at the front of the church, before the village seating but diagonal to the families with their own seating boxes. An old well can be seen behind the church to which the myths above relate. The church originally had 12 trees planted around it to signify the 12 disciples with Christ in the middle. Unfortunately, now there are only 10 trees standing around the church.

A Roman road passes close to Llanddoged, indicated by the nearby place-name: 'Sarn Ddu' shown on the map as the name of the local sewage works. Sarn, which means causeway in Welsh, has been commonly used to name Roman roads such as Sarn Helen, also in Roman Wales. Sarn is also used to indicate defences against water (flood, tide) where these, like Roman roads, involve significant built-up lines of layers of stones. There are also indications of a causeway.

A possible route on which this may stand is a NNW-SSE road starting close to the edge of the east bank of Afon Conwy, just SE of the Tan-yr-Allt building in Coed Bortho, facing the confirmed Roman fort at Caerhun, suggesting this road may have been to a Ferry or ford. It may have run SSE via Sarn Ddu towards Nebo, & the A5, but this is still being researched. Another possible route is a WSW-ENE road the route of which may run close to the nearby Caer Faban, another unconfirmed possible Roman site, in which case Llanddoged / Sarn Ddu may stand in the vicinity of Roman crossroads.

== See also ==
- Llanddoged and Maenan
