= Guy Martin (chef) =

French chef (born 1957)

- Born: 3 February 1957 (age 69); Bourg-Saint-Maurice, Savoie, France
- Culinary career
- Rating: Michelin stars (former)
- Current restaurant: Le Grand Véfour (Paris)
- Television show: Épicerie fine
- Website: www.grand-vefour.com www.atelierguymartin.com

Guy Martin (born 3 February 1957) is a French chef who earned three stars from the Guide Michelin. He is currently working the restaurant Le Grand Véfour in Paris.

== Life and career ==
Self-taught, Martin began his career as a pizzaiolo at age 17. He received his first Michelin star in 1984 after only six months as chef with a team of only three people. Martin then became head chef of the restaurant Le Grand Vefour that received three Michelin stars (reduced to two stars in 2008).

In 2010, Martin was chosen to prepare the celebratory meal of the annexation of Savoie to France, held at the Château of the dukes of Savoie in Chambéry and cooked for the former French President Nicolas Sarkozy himself.

Since 2011, Martin has hosted the television program Épicerie fine, for two seasons of 35 episodes, in which he travels to discover the origin of various foods and gives tips to prepare them. The program is broadcast on TV5 Monde, Cuisine TV and Voyage et Campagnes TV.

== Honours ==
- 1997 : Chevalier of the Ordre des Arts et des Lettres
- 2002 : Chevalier of the Ordre des Palmes Académiques
- 2003 : Chevalier of the Légion d'honneur
- 2012 : Officier of the Légion d'honneur
