= Aberconwy Abbey =

Abbey in north Wales

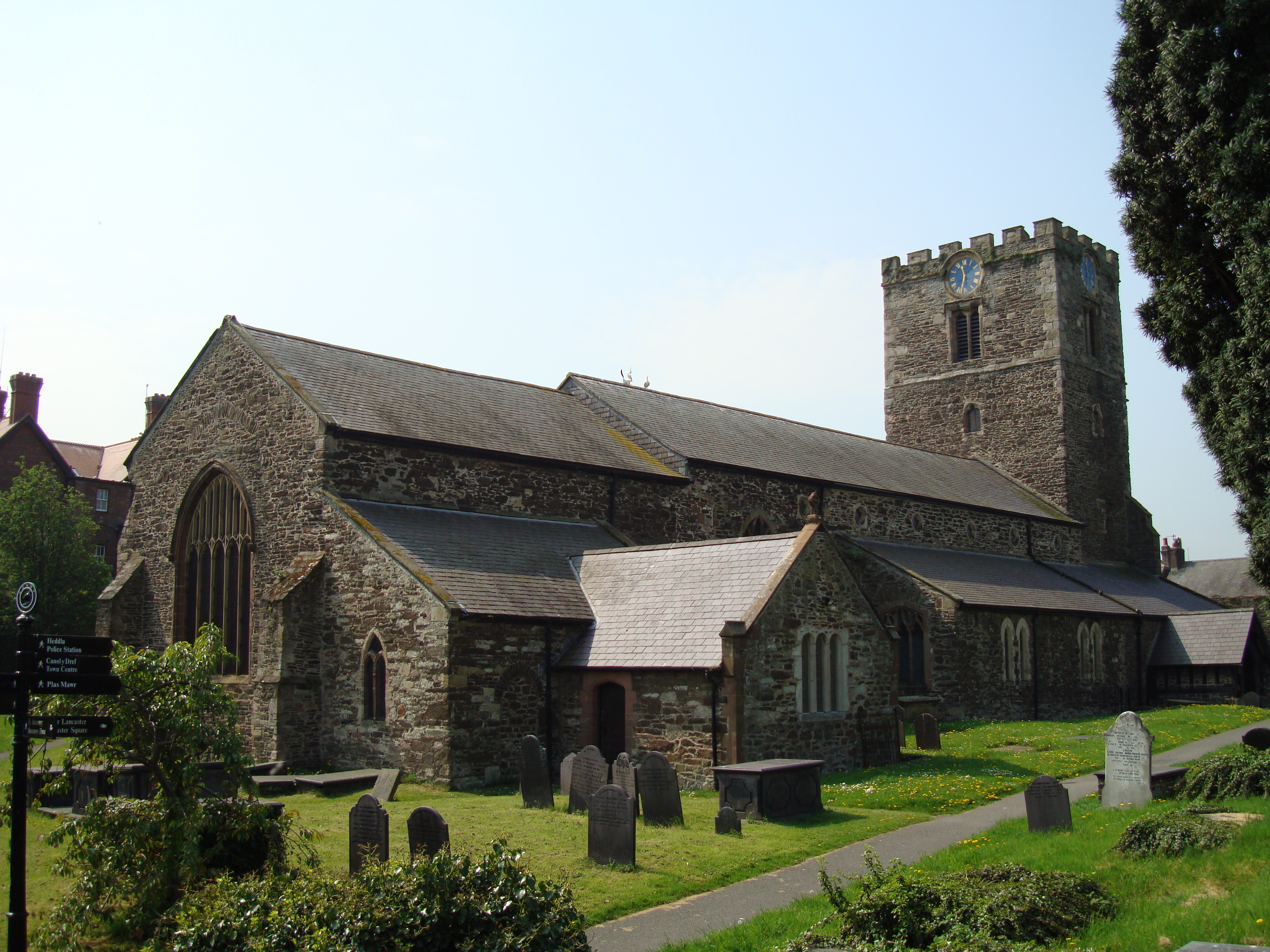
The former abbey church, now the parish church for Conwy

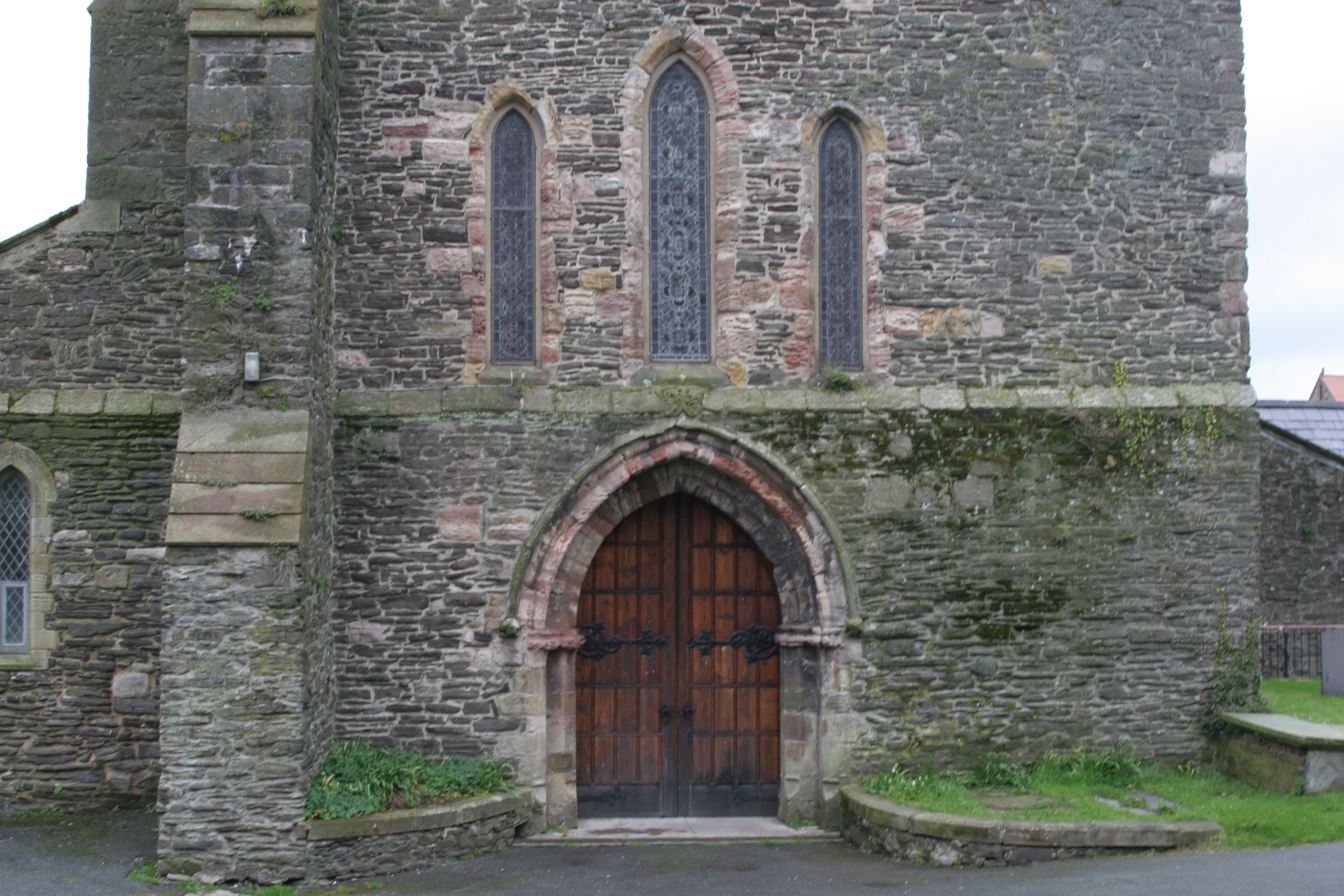
Abbey church doorway

Aberconwy Abbey was a Cistercian foundation at Conwy, later transferred to Maenan near Llanrwst, and in the 13th century was the most important abbey in the north of Wales.

A Cistercian house was founded at Rhedynog Felen near Caernarfon in 1186 by a group of monks from Strata Florida Abbey. About four or five years later they moved to Conwy, and in 1199 were given large grants of land by Llywelyn the Great who had recently become ruler of Gwynedd. Llywelyn was regarded as the founder of the house, and thanks to his support it came to hold more land than any other Welsh abbey, over 40,000 acres (160 km^{2}). On Llywelyn's death in 1240 he was buried at the abbey, and his son and successor Dafydd ap Llywelyn was also buried here in 1246. In 1248 Llywelyn's other son, Gruffydd ap Llywelyn, who had died trying to escape from the Tower of London in 1244, was reburied at Aberconwy after the abbot of Aberconwy, together with the abbot of Strata Florida, had arranged for his body to be repatriated from London.

The abbot of Aberconwy was an important figure in the negotiations between Llywelyn ap Gruffudd and the English crown later in the century, and in 1262 was entrusted with the task of being Llywelyn's sole representative in negotiations.

In 1282, King Edward I of England surrounded Snowdonia with a massive army. On 11 December Llywelyn ap Gruffudd, Tywysog Cymru, was lured into a trap and murdered.

In 1283 King Edward obliged the monks to move from Conwy to Maenan, further up the Conwy valley (53.1733°N 3.8123°W), so he could construct a castle and walled town at Conwy. The move had been completed by 1284, with Edward financing the building of a new abbey. In the 15th century the abbot, John ap Rhys, became involved in a dispute with Strata Florida Abbey and led some of his monks and some soldiers on a raid on that abbey. The abbey was valued at £162 in 1535 and was suppressed in 1537.

Little remains of the Maenan Abbey buildings, but the original abbey church in Conwy was adapted to become the parish church of St Mary & All Saints and although much rebuilt over the centuries some parts of the original church remain. The west wall with three lancet windows is considered to be a survival from the abbey, along with the lower parts of the east wall. The fine west doorway is believed to have been moved from elsewhere in the abbey, possibly the chapter house. The other buildings of the abbey are thought to have been located north and east of the church, including where Conwy Castle now stands.

== Bibliography ==
- R.N. Cooper (1992) Abbeys and Priories of Wales (Christopher Davies) ISBN 0-7154-0712-0
