= Cadair Ifan Goch =

Hill in Conwy County Borough, Wales

Coordinates: 53.1850°N 3.8132°W

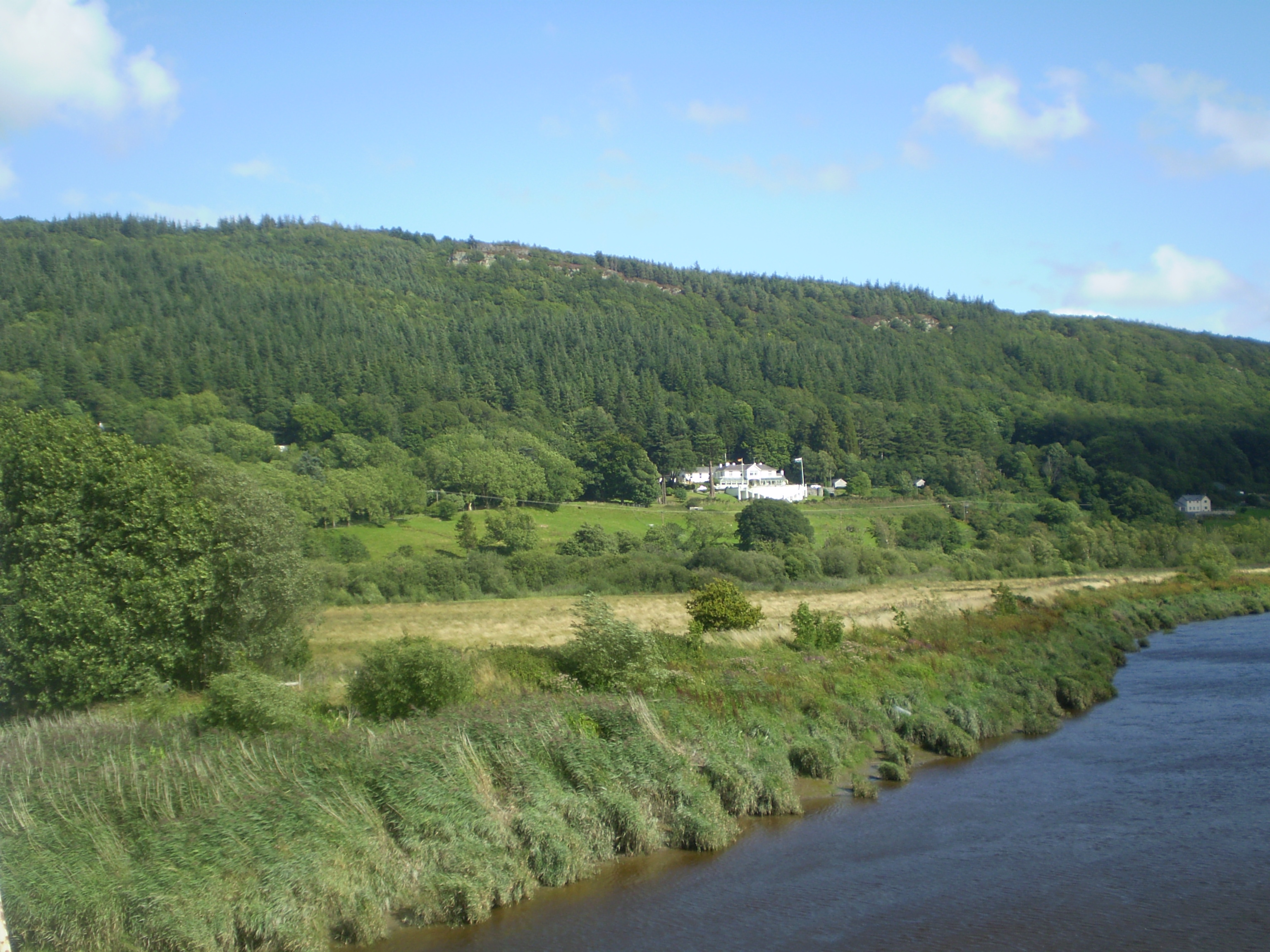
Cadair Ifan Goch viewed from the River Conwy at Dolgarrog

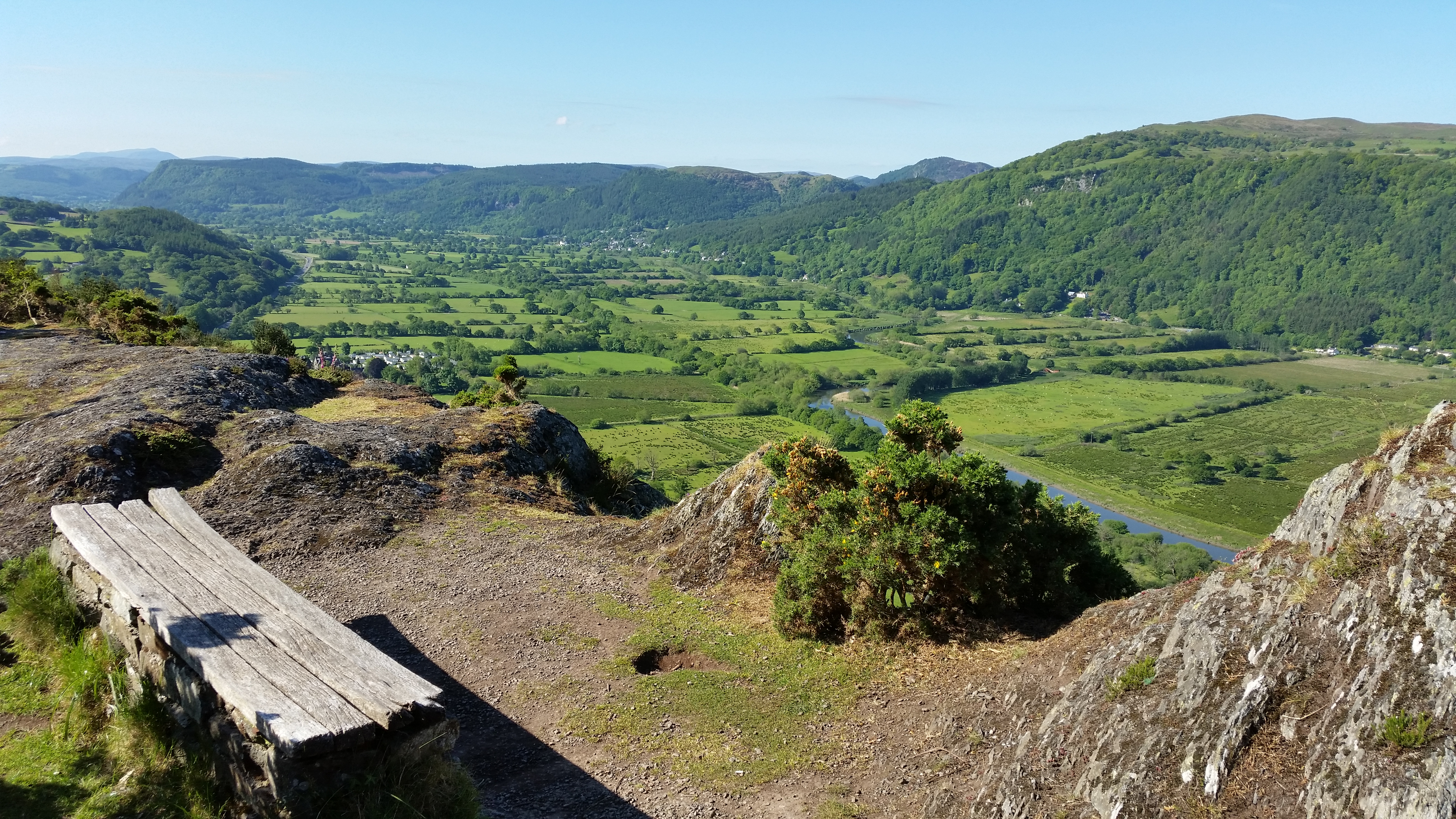
View SW across the Conwy Valley from Cadair Ifan Goch

Cadair Ifan Goch (Chair of Ifan Goch, the Giant) is a crag located above the Conwy Valley in North Wales in the community of Llanddoged and Maenan, and owned by the National Trust. The views extend across the whole of the valley to the Carneddau mountains, and even as far south as the Arenig mountains. The summit of the hill, a bit further up from the crag, reaches 207 metres (679 ft) above sea level.

According to legend, Ifan Goch the giant sat on this ledge to cool his feet in the river Conwy below. Another version tells how he is alleged to stand with one foot on Cadair Ifan Goch on one side of the valley, and the other on Pen-y-Gaer on the opposite side of the valley in order to wash his face in the river.
