= Maenan Abbey =

Historic building in Maenan, Wales

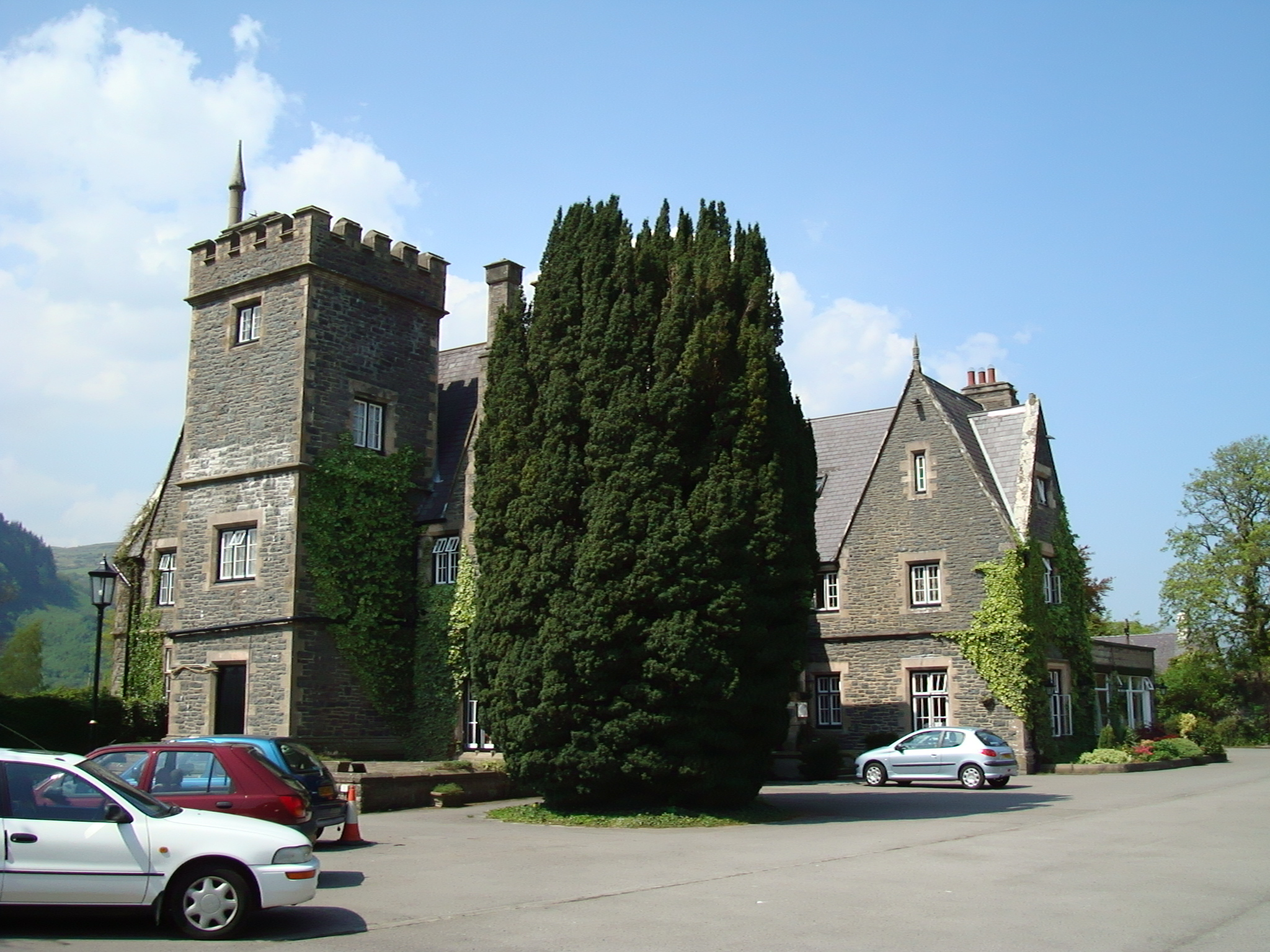
- Maenan Abbey

- Location within Conwy

General information
- Location: Near Llanrwst, Conwy, Wales
- Coordinates: 53°10′28″N 3°48′45″W
- Completed: 1283

Maenan Abbey (formally: The Abbey Church of Saint Mary and All Saints; alternatively: Abaty Maenan, or Maynan Abbey; now Maenan Abbey Hotel) was a monastic religious house located in Maenan, Conwy, Wales. It is situated near Llanrwst.

== History ==
A Cistercian community was founded at Rhedynog Felen near Caernarfon in 1186 by a group of monks from Strata Florida Abbey. In 1190/91, they moved to Conwy, establishing Aberconwy Abbey, and in 1283, they transferred to Maenan after a forced move by order of Edward I, this abbey's founder, who had decided to build a castle on the site of the monks' former home at Aberconwy. The Abbey was dedicated to Saint Mary and All Saints. The new monastery was regarded as an English royal foundation - King Edward was present at the foundation, and arranged the finances to construct the abbey buildings, donating a set of glass windows. In the Valor Ecclesiasticus survey of 1535, the abbey's income was assessed at £162, putting it among the smaller houses that were first to be suppressed as part of Henry VIII's dissolution of the monasteries. Due to the efforts of Abbot Richard ap Robert, the abbey at Maenan continued to exist until March 1537. At this point, the abbey's revenue was valued at £179 10s. 10d.

In 1563, the site of the abbey was given to Elizeus Wynne, who was also granted the township of Maenan itself. Wynne demolished many of the abbey's buildings, and used the materials to construct a new mansion on the site. Reused materials from the abbey were also incorporated in Gwydir Castle. The stone coffin of Prince Llewelyn the Great was moved from the abbey to the Gwydir Chapel at the church in Llanrwst. More materials were removed to repair the justice's hall at Caernarfon. Only a small arch remains of the original edifice, which was described in Samuel Lewis' topographical dictionary as "remarkable for the pleasantness of its situation and the beauty of its architecture".

In 1885, the Cambrian Archaeological Association noted discrepancies regarding the subsequent history of the Maenan Abbey estate:

Dugdale says, in his Monasticon, vol. v, p. 671:—"In 26 Henry VIII, the revenues of Conway, otherwise Maynan Abbey, amounted in clear income to £162 15s., in gross revenue to £179 10s. 10d. The site was granted in the fifth year of Queen Elizabeth to Elizaeus Wynne, in whose family it still continues, Lord Newborough being the present owner. A large house built from the materials of the abbey still remains." On the other hand, in the pedigree of Wynne of Garthewin, we find it stated that William Wynne of Melai married Mary, heiress of Maenan Abbey, being a daughter and co-heir of Sir Richard Clough of Plas Clough, Denbighshire. She died in 1632, and the abbey descended in the male line to John Wynne of Melai and Maenan, Sheriff of Denbighshire in 1712, who married Sydney, second daughter of Sir William Williams of Llanvorda, by whom he left two co-heirs, of whom Jane, the elder, married Sir John Wynn of Bodvean, and was so mother of Thomas Wynn, created Lord Newborough, 23 July 1776.

The grounds were excavated in 1963. In modern times, the site was developed into the Maenan Abbey Hotel. In 2011, three medieval walls were found in the grounds at Maenan Abbey Hotel while workmen were working on the drainage. They are believed to be the cloister walls, about 6 ft thick, dated to 1282. Cadw visited the site to assess the excavations.
