= Pentrefoelas =

Village and community in Conwy, Wales

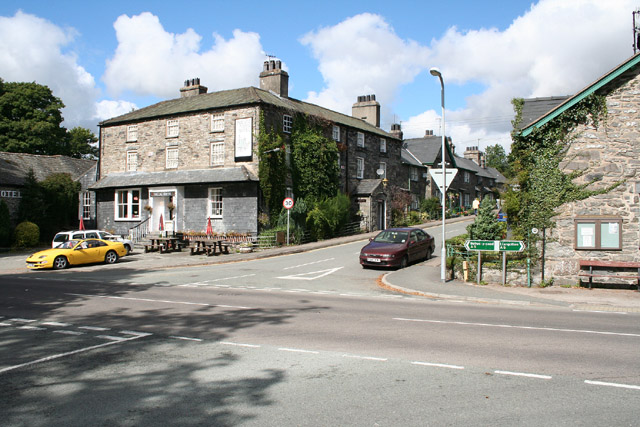
- The Foelas Arms

- Location within Conwy
- Population: 356 (2011)
- OS grid reference: SH872514
- Community: Pentrefoelas
- Principal area: Conwy
- Preserved county: Clwyd
- Country: Wales
- Sovereign state: United Kingdom
- Post town: BETWS-Y-COED
- Postcode district: LL24
- Dialling code: 01690
- Police: North Wales
- Fire: North Wales
- Ambulance: Welsh
- UK Parliament: Bangor Aberconwy
- Senedd Cymru – Welsh Parliament: Clwyd West
- List of places UK Wales Conwy 53.049°N 3.680°W Map of the community

Pentrefoelas is a village and community in Conwy County Borough, Wales. The village lies on the A5 road between Betws-y-Coed to the west and Cerrigydrudion to the east. Afon Merddwr, a tributary of the River Conwy, flows through it. The community had a population of 356 in the 2011 census, 70% were able to speak Welsh. It has an area of 53.86 km^{2} and covers a large region around the village including part of Mynydd Hiraethog, Llyn Alwen and part of Alwen Reservoir. It is in the electoral ward of Llangernyw. The community includes the small settlement of Rhydlydan.

The name of the village comes from pentre (Welsh for 'village') and a nearby hill, Foel Las ('green bare-topped hill'). The hill is the site of a motte built around 1164 in the time of Owain Gwynedd. Old Voelas House (or Plas Foel Las), mansion of the Wynne family, was built at the foot of the hill in 1545. It was demolished in 1819 and a new site was established two kilometres to the west. The current Voelas Hall was built in 1961 and was designed by the architect Clough Williams-Ellis.

Other buildings around the village include:

- Plas Iolyn, home to Rhys Fawr ap Maredudd, his son Robert ap Rhys (the chaplain to Cardinal Wolsey), his grandson the 16th-century MP Elis Prys (known as Dr Coch and notorious for his oppression of the district) and his great-grandson, the poet Tomos Prys. It is now a farmhouse.
- Gilar, built in the 16th century for the poet Rhys Wyn ap Cadwaladr (fl. c. 1600), perhaps by his father Cadwaladr ap Maurice after receiving a substantial grant of land from Henry VIII in 1545–1546, which included the land later occupied by Plas Iolyn and Old Voelas House.
- The village had a chapelry of Ysbyty Ifan built in 1766 and known as Voelas Chapel. The Parish Church was built on the same site in 1857–1859.
- The Pentrefoelas watermill (Melin Voelas) for grinding flour dates from 1815 and was restored by Clwyd County Council as part of a heritage scheme. The ironwork for the external overshot waterwheel was originally cast by the Llanrwst Foundry probably sometime in the 19th century
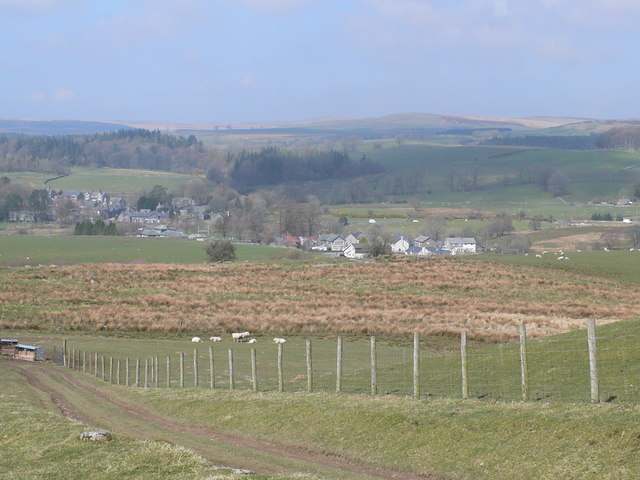
View towards the village

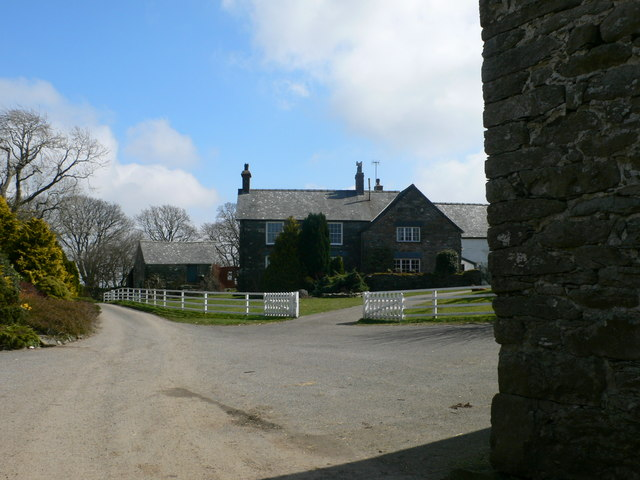
Plas Iolyn

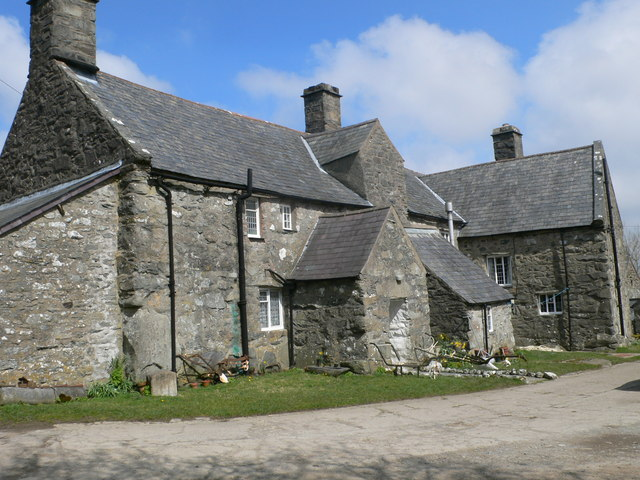
Gilar

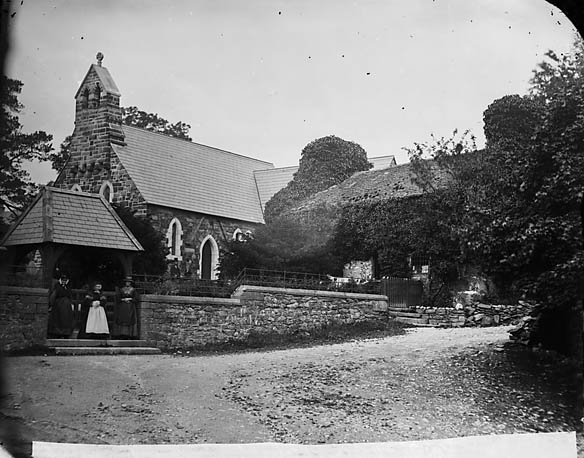
Parish Church c. 1875

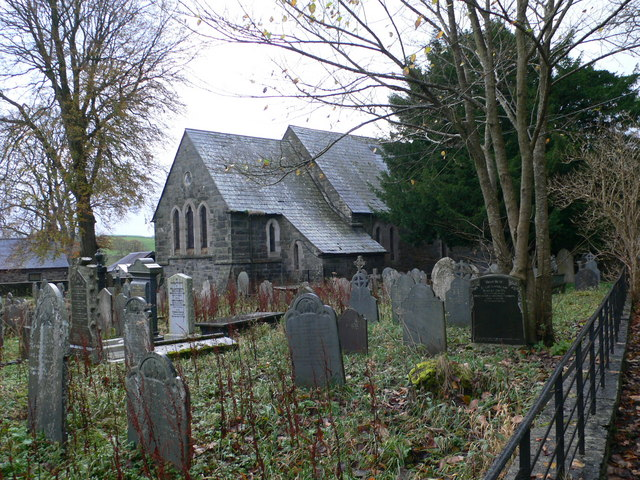
Graveyard, Pentrefoelas

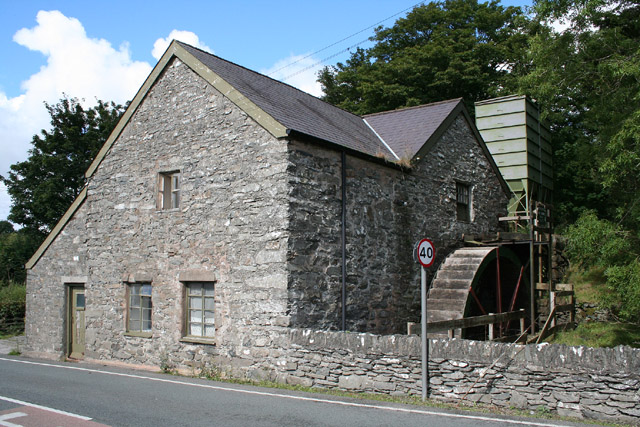
Pentrefoelas watermill

== Climate ==
Climate data for Alwen 345m amsl (1991–2020 normals, extremes 1960–2019)
Month	Jan	Feb	Mar	Apr	May	Jun	Jul	Aug	Sep	Oct	Nov	Dec	Year
Record high °C (°F)	14.8 (58.6)	16.1 (61.0)	21.1 (70.0)	22.5 (72.5)	24.5 (76.1)	30.0 (86.0)	31.4 (88.5)	30.8 (87.4)	28.0 (82.4)	22.8 (73.0)	18.5 (65.3)	14.0 (57.2)	31.4 (88.5)
Mean daily maximum °C (°F)	6.3 (43.3)	6.4 (43.5)	8.4 (47.1)	11.1 (52.0)	14.4 (57.9)	16.6 (61.9)	18.4 (65.1)	17.8 (64.0)	15.8 (60.4)	12.2 (54.0)	9.0 (48.2)	6.8 (44.2)	11.9 (53.5)
Daily mean °C (°F)	3.1 (37.6)	3.2 (37.8)	4.7 (40.5)	6.8 (44.2)	9.8 (49.6)	12.3 (54.1)	14.3 (57.7)	13.9 (57.0)	11.8 (53.2)	8.8 (47.8)	5.9 (42.6)	3.6 (38.5)	8.2 (46.7)
Mean daily minimum °C (°F)	0.0 (32.0)	0.1 (32.2)	0.9 (33.6)	2.6 (36.7)	5.3 (41.5)	8.0 (46.4)	10.1 (50.2)	9.8 (49.6)	7.8 (46.0)	5.4 (41.7)	2.7 (36.9)	0.5 (32.9)	4.4 (40.0)
Record low °C (°F)	−16.7 (1.9)	−16.7 (1.9)	−17.2 (1.0)	−9.5 (14.9)	−6.1 (21.0)	−2.5 (27.5)	−1.1 (30.0)	−1.1 (30.0)	−3.3 (26.1)	−5.0 (23.0)	−12.0 (10.4)	−16.8 (1.8)	−17.2 (1.0)
Average rainfall mm (inches)	149.4 (5.88)	116.0 (4.57)	96.5 (3.80)	90.4 (3.56)	87.6 (3.45)	81.0 (3.19)	84.6 (3.33)	90.9 (3.58)	104.2 (4.10)	141.8 (5.58)	152.7 (6.01)	178.2 (7.02)	1,373.3 (54.07)
Average rainy days (≥ 1.0 mm)	18.1	15.3	15.0	13.8	13.4	11.8	13.3	14.3	14.0	16.8	19.6	19.1	184.5
Source 1: Meteoclimat
Source 2: KNMI (extremes)

== Notable residents ==
- Charlotte Godley (née Griffiths-Wynne), born in Voelas House, was the wife of John Robert Godley, founder of Christchurch, New Zealand.
- Edward Wynne-Finch, born in Voelas House, first-class cricketer
