= Afon Merddwr =

River in the county of Conwy, Wales

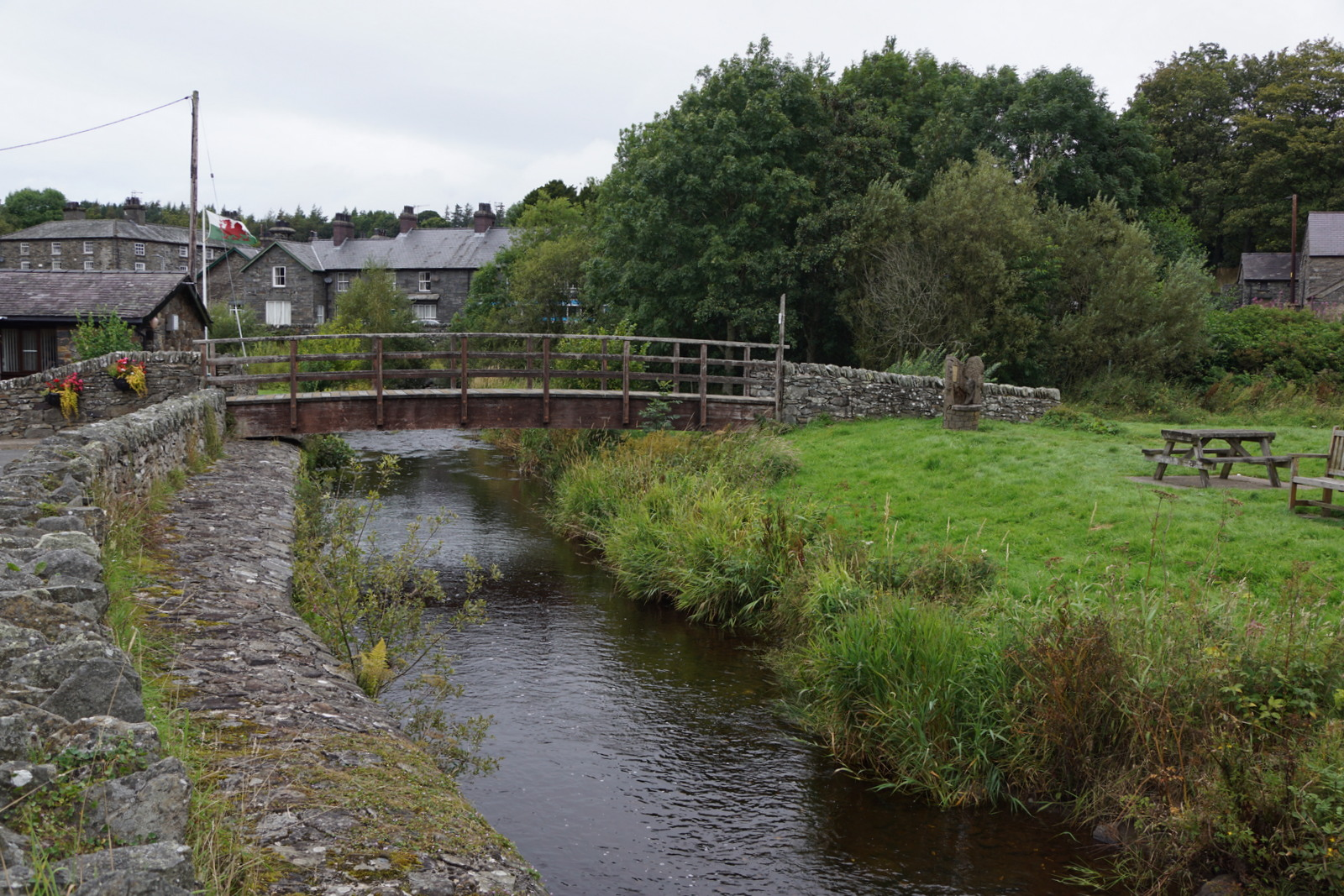
- Afon Merddwr at Pentrefoelas

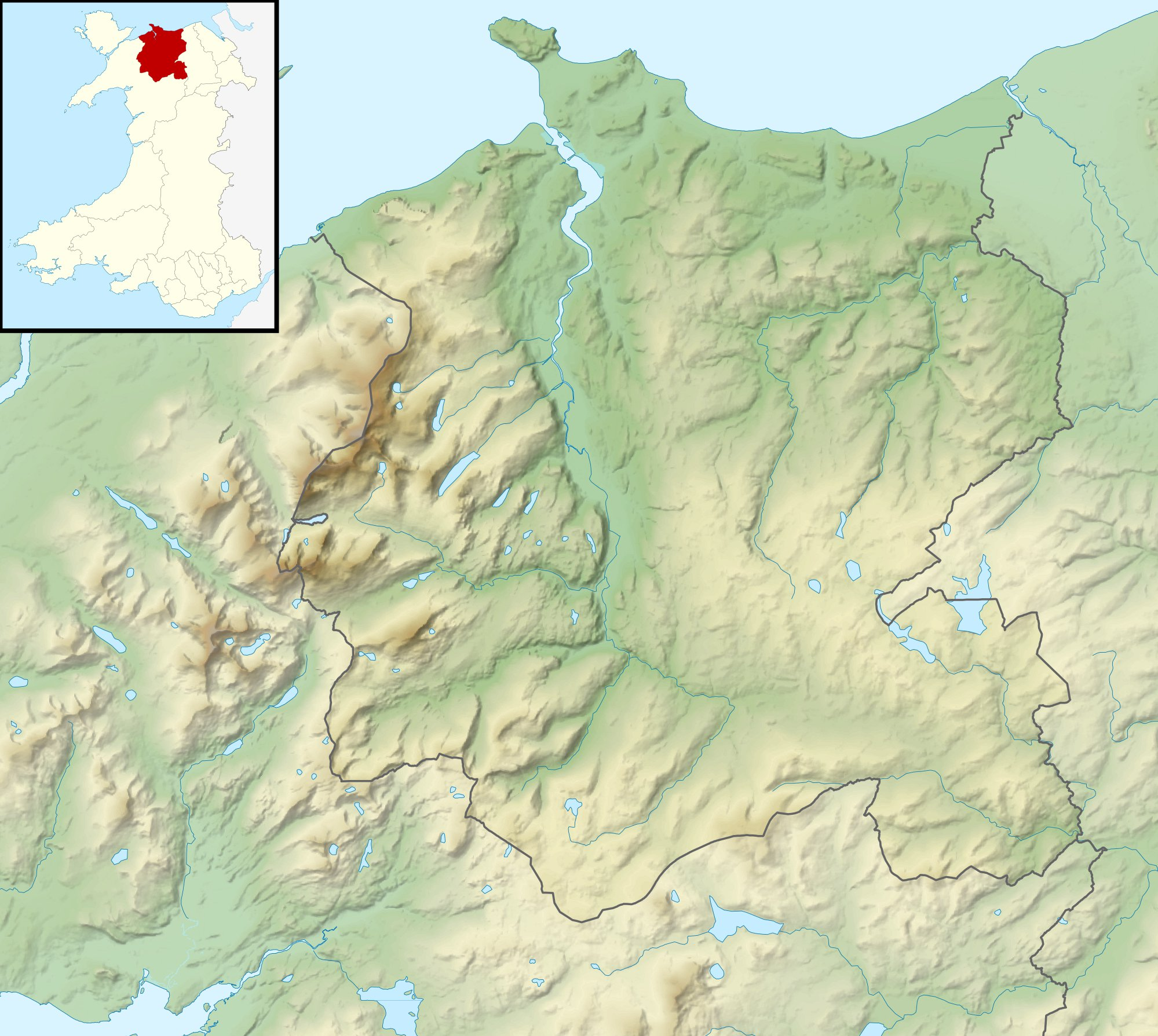
- Location of the mouth within Conwy
- Etymology: Welsh for stagnant water

Location
- Country: Wales
- Counties: Gwynedd

Physical characteristics
- Source
  - location: Mwdwl-eithin
  - coordinates: 53.061°N 3.621°W
- Mouth
  - location: River Conwy
  - coordinates: 53.045°N 3.707°W
- Length: 16 km (9.9 mi)

Afon Merddwr is a river in the south of the county of Conwy, Wales. It is a tributary of the River Conwy and joins it near Pentrefoelas. It is about 10 km long. "Merddwr" is Welsh for backwater or stagnant water, suggesting that it was named for its current or water quality.

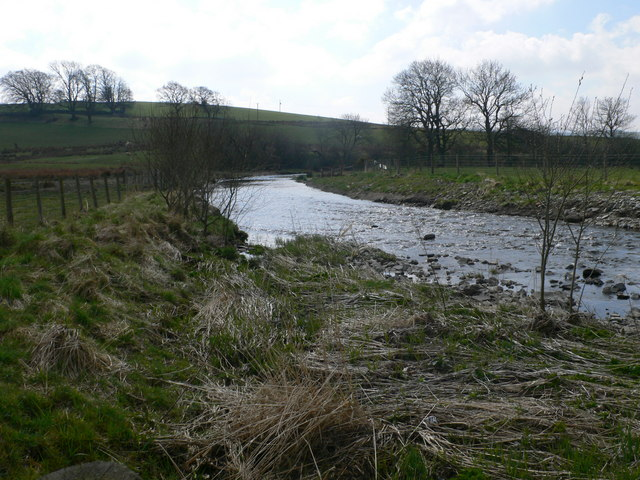
Merddwr flowing west at Pentrefoelas

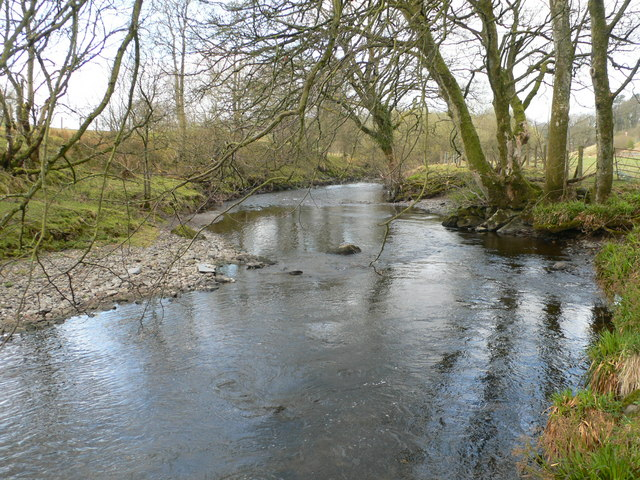
Afon Merddwr

== Course of the river ==
The source of the river is on the southern slopes of Mwdwl-eithin (532 m), the highest hill in Mynydd Hiraethog (the Denbigh Moors). Its name for the first part of its course is Afon Llaethog ("Milky River"). It flows south before turning west near the small village of Glasfryn.

Several streams flow down from the hills into the river as it flows through wetland and marshes to its confluence near Rhydlydan with the Afon Nug, a small stream that flows from the hills above Pentrefoelas. The marshes are a Site of Special Scientific Interest known as Corsydd Nug a Merddwr ("Nug and Merddwr Marshes").

The river flows beside the A5 road, under a bridge for the B5113 near Pentrefoelas, and on for another 2 km to the River Conwy north of Ysbyty Ifan.
