= Hafod Elwy Moor National Nature Reserve =

Nature reserve in Wales

Coordinates: 53.0950°N 3.5736°W

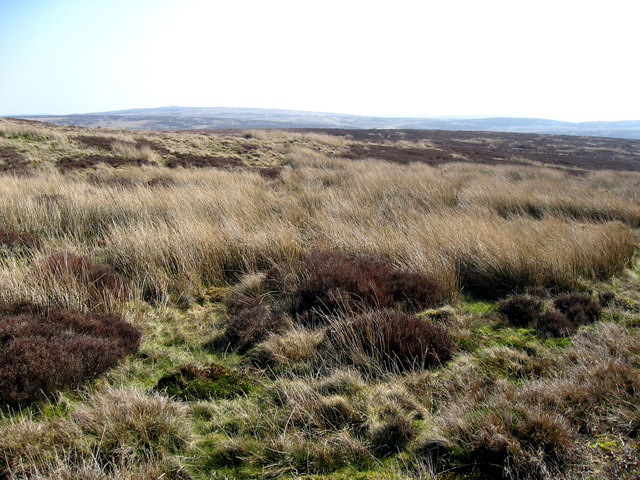
A view of Mynydd Hiraethog (Denbigh Moors) between Llyn Brenig and Llyn Alwen

Hafod Elwy Moor National Nature Reserve, located in the moorland above the town of Denbigh in Denbighshire, North Wales, is part of the Mynydd Hiraethog Site of Special Scientific Interest, formerly managed by the Countryside Council for Wales and now under the jurisdiction of Natural Resources Wales. Established in 1999, it comprises an 82-hectare (200-acre) patch of upland moor lying between the lakes of Llyn Brenig and Llyn Alwen. A conifer forest planted by the Forestry Commission borders the moor to the south and east.

With plant life dominated by heather and bilberry, the reserve provides important habitat for ground-nesting birds. Birds found in the area include the Northern wheatear, and some black grouse. The reserve is classified as a Category IV site by the International Union for Conservation of Nature, meaning that the area regularly needs active interventions to support particular species. Conservation efforts focus on increasing black grouse populations. In addition to these ground-nesting birds, the reserve is home to merlins and other small birds of prey such as peregrine falcons, kestrels, and hen harriers.

The reserve is open to the public, but has no facilities; except for one bridle path, it is difficult to traverse on foot. The nearest roads are the A543 and the B4501, with access via the Brenig Visitor Centre off the B4501.

The name "Hafod Elwy" references a hafod, or Welsh summer farmhouse. According to local folktales, captured in a ballad, Hafod Elwy was home to a man named Ffowc Owen in the 1770s, who could not marry his true love and froze to death on the moor. A memorial cairn for Owen is said to be present on the moor.
