= Ellis Price =

Welsh administrator and politician

Ellis Price or Prys (by 1514-8 October 1594) was a Welsh administrator and MP.

He was a younger son of Robert ap Rhys of Plas Iolyn near Ysbyty Ifan, the chaplain to Cardinal Wolsey. His grandfather Rhys Fawr ap Maredudd had fought (and thought to have carried the red dragon flag) at Bosworth with Henry VII .

Ellis studied at St Nicholas Hostel, Cambridge and was awarded BCL in 1533 and DCL in 1534 and from the red gown of his degree was known as ‘Y Doctor Coch’ (‘The Red Doctor’).

In 1535 he was appointed visitor of monasteries in Wales by Thomas Cromwell and played a leading role in their subsequent destruction. There were complaints about his immorality and arrogance and he was dismissed. In 1538 he became chancellor and commissary-general of the Diocese of St Asaph and sinecure rector of Llangwm, Llandrillo-yn-Rhos and Llanuwchllyn. At about this time he was sued in Chancery by the vicar of Llanarmon, Denbighshire, who complained that Price aided and abetted in the misappropriation of tithes; he also took part in an assault upon the Welsh scholar and translator of the New Testament into Welsh, William Salesbury of Llanrwst, Denbighshire, who was his brother-in-law.

He was a Justice of the Peace for Merioneth in 1543 and from 1555 to his death, for Denbighshire from 1555 to his death, for Caernarvonshire from 1561 to his death, for Anglesey and Montgomeryshire in 1564, and for most Welsh counties by 1575. He was appointed High Sheriff of Denbighshire for 1548–49, 1556–57, 1568–69 and 1572–73 and High Sheriff of Merionethshire for 1551–52, 1555–56, 1563–64, 1567–68, 1573–74, 1578–79 and 1583–84. In the intervening years he also served as High Sheriff of Caernarvonshire (1558–59) and High Sheriff of Anglesey (1577–78 and 1585–86).

He was elected MP for Merioneth in 1558 and 1563. Other offices included Custos Rotulorum of Merionethshire from 1558/59 to 1577 or later, member of the Council in the Marches of Wales from 1560 to his death, and Master in Chancery extraordinary.

In 1560, the Crown awarded him the manor of Tir Ifan, with lands at Ysbyty Ifan and Penmachno. When Queen Elizabeth gave the lordship of Denbigh as a gift to Robert Dudley, 1st Earl of Leicester in 1564, Price, as steward of the estates, carried out acts of oppression in the area. He was on the commission granted by Elizabeth to hold the Eisteddfod at Caerwys in 1567.

He married twice: firstly to Catherine, the daughter of Thomas Conway of Bodrhyddan, Flintshire, who bore him a son; and secondly to Ellyw, the daughter of Owain Pool, rector of Llandecwyn, Merioneth, who delivered two further sons and four daughters. His third son was the adventurer poet Tomos Prys.
