= Cerrigydrudion =

Village in north Wales

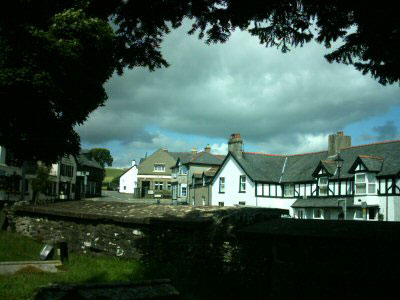
- Cerrigydrudion

- Location within Conwy
- Area: 61.28 km^{2} (23.66 sq mi)
- Population: 740 (2011)
  - Density: 12/km^{2} (31/sq mi)
- OS grid reference: SH952488
- Community: Cerrigydrudion
- Principal area: Conwy
- Preserved county: Clwyd
- Country: Wales
- Sovereign state: United Kingdom
- Post town: CORWEN
- Postcode district: LL21
- Dialling code: 01490
- Police: North Wales
- Fire: North Wales
- Ambulance: Welsh
- UK Parliament: Bangor Aberconwy
- Senedd Cymru – Welsh Parliament: Clwyd West
- List of places UK Wales Conwy 53.026°N 3.562°W Map of the community

Cerrigydrudion, sometimes spelt Cerrig-y-drudion, (Welsh pronunciation) is a village and community in Conwy, Wales. Until 1974 it was part of the historic county Denbighshire, when it became part of the newly formed county of Clwyd. When the county of Clwyd was abolished in 1996, the village was transferred to the new Conwy County Borough. The village formerly lay on the A5, but a short by-pass now takes the road along the south-western edge of the village. Prior to the by-pass being built, Cerrigydrudion was the highest village on the A5 between London and Holyhead. The community includes the hamlets of Cefn Brith, Glasfryn and Pentre-Llyn-Cymmer with the village having a population of around 740(2011). The community is sparsely populated and covers over 60 square kilometres.

== Geography and history ==
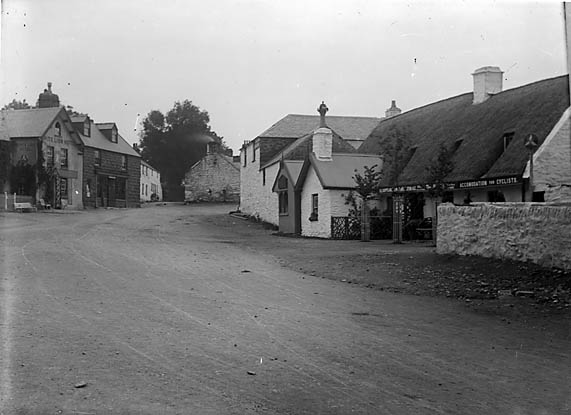
Cerrigydrudion, circa 1885, photographed by John Thomas

Geographically the area is classed as moorland and less favourable grassland. It is on the outskirts of Mynydd Hiraethog, and the southern half of Llyn Brenig and also Alwen Reservoir lie in the community. The oldest feature of the village is the parish church dedicated to Saint Mary Magdalene. It is believed to have existed in 440 AD. It is also mentioned in the 'Norwich Taxation' of 1254. The village is the largest in the area known as Uwchaled which also includes Llangwm, Pentrefoelas, Pentre-llyn-cymer, Dinmael, Glasfryn, Cefn Brith, Llanfihangel.G.M and Cwm Penanner. Llangwm and Pentrefoelas are stand-alone parishes whilst the remainder fall within the parish of Cerrigydrudion. However, there are multiple Nonconformist chapels throughout the area of Uwchaled, located in many of the minor villages and hamlets.

The village was mentioned in the writings of several noted travellers including Edward Lhuyd and George Borrow. It attained a certain significance in the 18th century when Thomas Telford built the A5 turnpike Toll road between London and Holyhead. This would be the main route to Ireland. The road passed through the village. In the farmhouse of Ceirnioge Mawr, where the stagecoach and Mail coach horses were changed, there is a plaque marking the fact that Queen Victoria stopped there en route to Ireland.

The 2011 population of the community stands at 740 residents. The community remains one of the heartlands of the Welsh language and in the census of 2001, 80% stated they had some knowledge of the language and over 76% stated that they used spoken Welsh in their normal every-day life.

Remnants of human habitation have been found in the area dating back to the Mesolithic era. Many of these were found in the area of Llyn Brenig, a manmade reservoir to the north of the village. The reservoir was built between 1973 and 1976 and was one of the major British engineering projects of that era. Today it is the most important tourist attraction in the area and provides competition class fly fishing facilities for many visitors.

In 1924, a farmer was carrying out repairs on a wall at Ty-tan-y-Foel Farm when he found significant Iron Age remains in a stone-lined cist. He had uncovered a small burial chamber. The decorated bronze fragments that were found are the remains of what is now known as 'The Cerrigydrudion Crown', one of the earliest examples of Celtic La Tène art found in Britain, dating from between 405 BC and 380 BC. Archaeologists thought for decades that the fragments formed a vessel, but recent research has revealed that it is a headpiece decorated with palm leaf and lotus flower designs. The crown fragments are held at Amgueddfa Cymru in Cardiff. In 2007, staff at Amgueddfa Cymru decided to reconstruct the crown as it might have been when first manufactured. Jacqueline Chadwick, an artist, and Nodge Nolan, a craftsman who specialised in reconstructing Roman era artefacts, were commissioned to produce it. It is now exhibited alongside the fragments.

One of the most famous sons of the parish is Jac Glan-y-Gors, who was a leading Radical at the end of the 18th century. His ideas were published in the polemical pamphlets Seren tan Gwmwl ("Star under a Cloud") and Toriad y Dydd ("Break of Day").

Cerrigydruidion Golf Club (now defunct) was founded in 1898. The club and course disappeared at the time of World War II.

Heading out of Cerrigydrudion up a minor road off the B5105 is an Iron Age hillfort called Caer Caradog. This fort dates to pre Roman times and although the origin of the fort's name is unclear, as Caradog can be Latinised as Caratacus, it possibly refers to the 1st century warrior Caratacus who fought against the Romans. A novel published in 2018 called Swords and Slavery describes a battle between Celts and Romans at this fort.

== Climate ==
The Cerrigydrudion area possesses an oceanic climate (Köppen climate classification Cfb) similar to almost all of the United Kingdom. Due to its upland setting, it tends to be cooler than coastal areas of Wales throughout the year, and heavy snowfall can occur during winter months. The nearest MetOffice weather station at Alwen, about 2.5 miles to the North, holds the Welsh record for the coldest day for the months of June, September and October

Climate data for Alwen, 2.5 miles North of Cerrigydrudion, elevation 345m, 1991-2020, extremes 1960-
Month	Jan	Feb	Mar	Apr	May	Jun	Jul	Aug	Sep	Oct	Nov	Dec	Year
Record high °C (°F)	14.8 (58.6)	16.1 (61.0)	21.1 (70.0)	22.5 (72.5)	24.4 (75.9)	30.0 (86.0)	31.4 (88.5)	30.8 (87.4)	28.0 (82.4)	22.8 (73.0)	15.5 (59.9)	13.5 (56.3)	31.4 (88.5)
Mean daily maximum °C (°F)	6.3 (43.3)	6.4 (43.5)	8.4 (47.1)	11.1 (52.0)	14.4 (57.9)	16.6 (61.9)	18.4 (65.1)	17.8 (64.0)	15.8 (60.4)	12.2 (54.0)	9.0 (48.2)	6.8 (44.2)	11.9 (53.5)
Mean daily minimum °C (°F)	0.0 (32.0)	0.1 (32.2)	0.9 (33.6)	2.6 (36.7)	5.3 (41.5)	8.0 (46.4)	10.1 (50.2)	9.8 (49.6)	7.8 (46.0)	5.4 (41.7)	2.7 (36.9)	0.5 (32.9)	4.4 (40.0)
Record low °C (°F)	−16.7 (1.9)	−16.7 (1.9)	−17.2 (1.0)	−9.5 (14.9)	−6.1 (21.0)	−2.5 (27.5)	−1.1 (30.0)	−1.1 (30.0)	−3.3 (26.1)	−5 (23)	−9.7 (14.5)	−16.8 (1.8)	−17.2 (1.0)
Average precipitation mm (inches)	149.4 (5.88)	116.0 (4.57)	96.5 (3.80)	90.4 (3.56)	87.6 (3.45)	81.0 (3.19)	84.6 (3.33)	90.9 (3.58)	104.2 (4.10)	141.8 (5.58)	152.7 (6.01)	178.2 (7.02)	1,373.3 (54.07)
Average rainy days	18.1	15.3	15.0	13.8	13.4	11.8	13.3	14.3	14.0	16.8	19.6	19.1	184.5
Source 1: Royal Dutch Meteorological Institute/KNMI
Source 2: Meteoclimat

== Economy and daily life ==
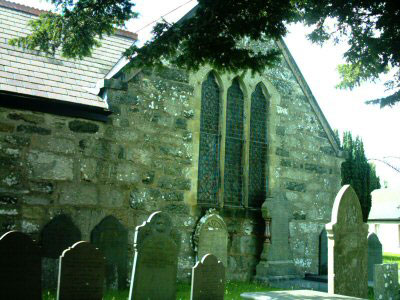
Saint Mary Magdalene Parish Church

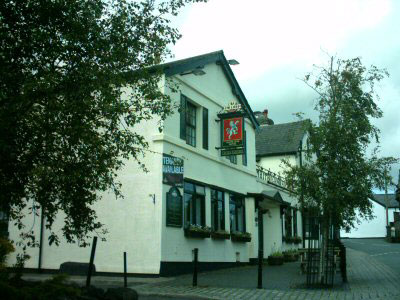
The White Lion

The biggest employer in the parish remains agriculture, although tourism-related work is becoming common.

Apart from the church the village has two active Nonconformist chapels. These are Jerusalem, which is dedicated to the Methodist Calvinist group, and Moriah which follows the Congregational path. A third chapel, Seion, which was part of the Wesleyan tradition, was closed in 2002.

The village has one public house, The White Lion this was owned in the 1970s by the famous Welsh entertainer Ronnie Williams who formed half of the duo Ryan and Ronnie. It once received as a guest the British Prime Minister David Lloyd George when he was unable to return home due to heavy snowfall. Across the road from The White Lion is The Queens Head, which closed in the 1990s.

Other facilities include a cafe on the A5 main road called Ty Tan Llan Cafe, public toilets, library, a grocery shop and post office called Siop Uwchaled.

Nearby is the older Alwen Reservoir, built between 1909 and 1921 to provide drinking water for the English town of Birkenhead. At its conception the engineer who designed the dam, George Deacon, also planned Llyn Brenig, built over half a century later.

One of the most popular social gatherings in the village occurs on the first Saturday in September when the local Agricultural Show takes place. This attracts upwards of 3,000 people and is one of the most successful non-county shows in Wales.

== Popular culture ==
The village is the setting for the song "A Child Is Born In Cerrig-Y-Drudion", on Julian Cope's 2007 album You Gotta Problem with Me.
