= Clocaenog Forest =

Coniferous plantation in north Wales

Coordinates: 53.06504°N 3.47886°W

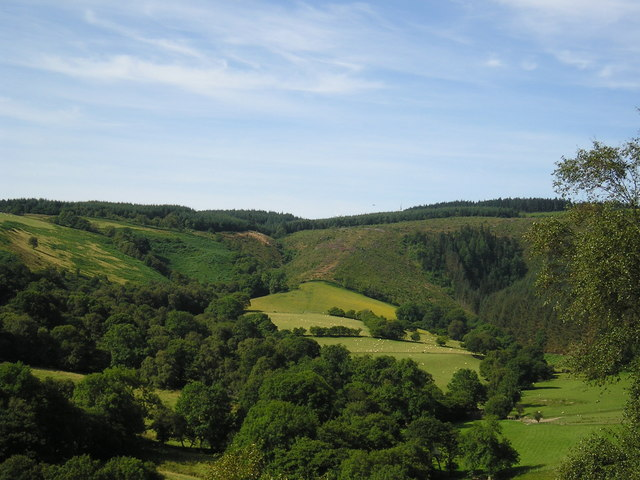
Clocaenog Forest at head of Clywedog Valley.

The Clocaenog Forest is in west Denbighshire and east Conwy, Wales on Mynydd Hiraethog. It takes its name from the village of Clocaenog, near Ruthin.

== History ==
It is 40 square miles (100 km^{2}) in extent, mostly coniferous softwoods under the control of Natural Resources Wales. It was planted in 1905 on what was mostly moorland and many hill farms. It is a highland region, mostly above 350 metres. It experienced a severe winter in 1946/47 with over 150 cm of lying snow on flat ground recorded at Clawdd-newydd (a nearby village), and there was another hard winter in 1962/63. It is also one of the last mainland strongholds of red squirrels in Wales.

== Geography ==
There are high points which rise above the tree level, affording views of Snowdonia and Arenig Fawr to the west, the Berwyn Range to the south, the Clwydian Range to the east, and the Denbigh moors to the north. The highest point in the forest is 'The Mast' at Craig Bron Bannog 501m (1,644 feet).

Video by Natural Resources Wales on protecting the red squirrel at Clocaenog Forest

Wildlife includes many birds, including the common crossbill, which is adapted well to the conifers. Nesting platforms have been built at the top of bare trees. There is also an enclosed area where wild horses (Przewalski's Horses) can be viewed. In addition, there are several examples of ancient remains, including at least one stone circle and the "credstone", an ancient worship site.

Streams run through the forest, including the source of the River Clwyd; Llyn Brenig lies on the western flank.

== Events ==
The Clocaenog Forest was the murder and burial location of Edward Carthy who, at 28, was the youngest victim of serial killer Peter Moore.

In March 2002, a 47-year-old man with schizophrenia by the name of Richard Sumner died after handcuffing himself to a tree in the forest and throwing away the key. He wasn't found until April 2005, when a woman and her dog found his skeleton. It was believed he struggled to break free after scuff marks on the tree were found.

In 2015 the body of an unidentified murder victim was discovered in the forest by two brothers who were attending the 2015 Wales Rally GB. In 2005 a wind farm with 25 wind turbines was constructed. The three groups of turbines, north to south, are Tir Mostyn (8), Foel Goch (7) and Marial Gwyn (10). Many more wind turbines are planned. In 2019 deliveries of components for the Clocaenog Forest Wind Farm begun, consisting of 27 Vestas V105 turbines, transported from Ellesmere Port to the development site. Deliveries took place over six months, with a total of 270 components. Halifax-based specialist Collett Transport delivered the components, the final three tower sections being delivered on 26 July 2019.
