= Mwdwl-eithin =

Hill in Conwy County Borough, Wales

Mwdl-eithin
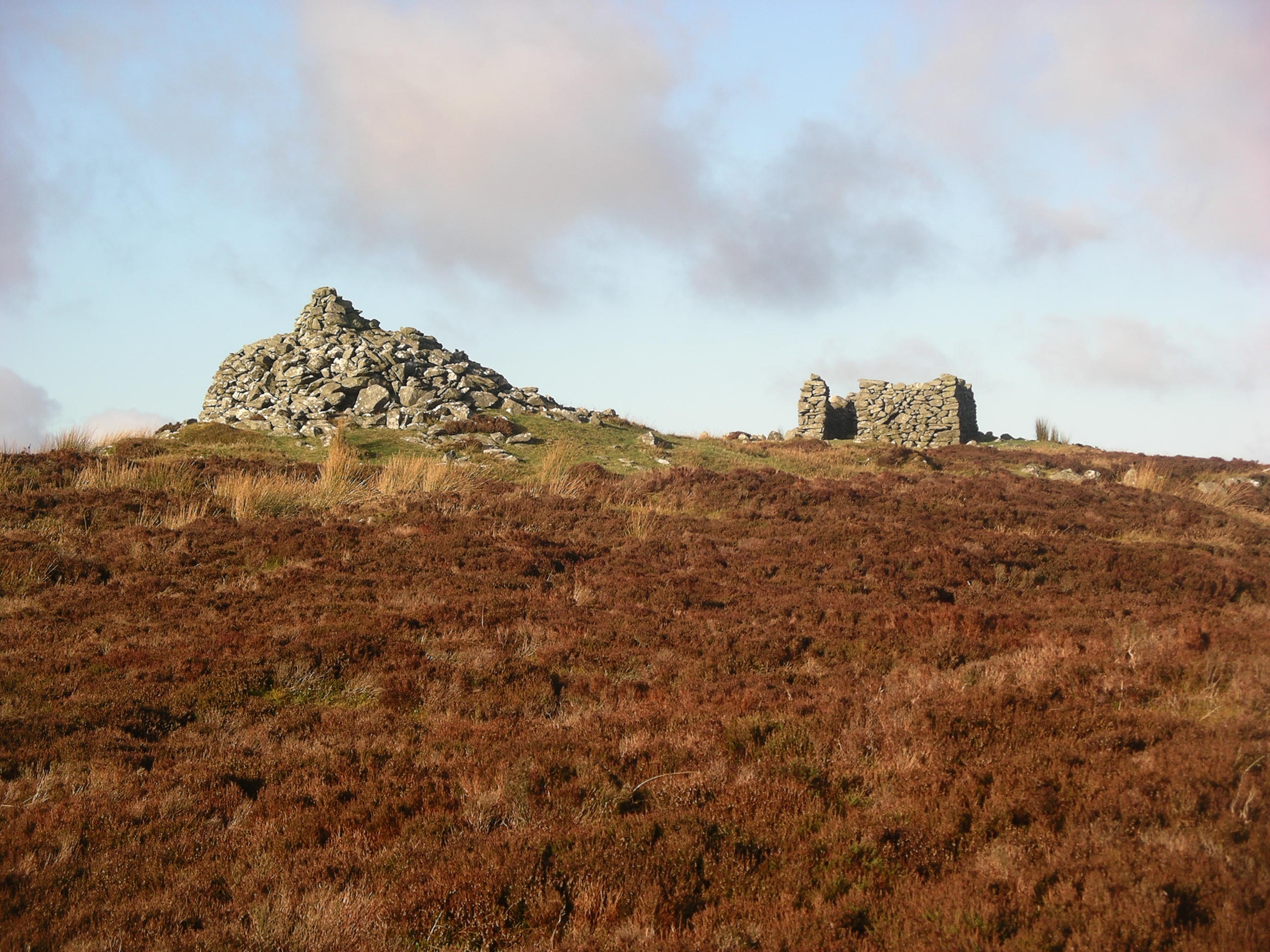
- Mwdwl-eithin peak with cairn on left and trig point obscured by ruined building

Highest point
- Elevation: 532 m (1,745 ft)
- Prominence: 263 m (863 ft)
- Parent peak: Carnedd y Filiast
- Listing: Marilyn
- Coordinates: 53.0727°N 3.6178°W

Naming
- Language of name: Welsh

Geography
- Location: Conwy, Wales
- Parent range: Snowdonia
- OS grid: SH917540
- Topo map: OS Landranger 115

Mwdwl-eithin (532 metres (1,745 ft)) is the highest point on the Denbigh Moors (Welsh: Mynydd Hiraethog) of North Wales. This gently rising mountain lies about 10 miles (16 km) east of Betws-y-Coed. On its summit is a trig point and a ruined building which still provides shelter against a storm. A few metres away is a large raised stone cairn.

The whole area is underlain by Silurian mudstone which was extensively glaciated during the last British glaciation. The whole area is now very wet moorland dominated by heather (Calluna and Erica spp.) and rushes. Three of the surrounding valleys and depressions have been used for drinking water storage reservoirs, Llyn Alwen, Llyn Aled and Alwen Reservoir.

Multiple proposals have been made to erect a wind farm on the mountain. In 2007 Conwy councillors rejected a proposal to build a 12 turbine wind farm. In 2009 the same developer proposed a 11 turbine wind farm, and were granted permission by Conwy County Council. The proposals have been controversial, with some locals protesting that the turbines could lower house prices, and effect tourism.
