= Peter Moore (serial killer) =

Welsh serial killer

- Peter Moore's mugshot
- Born: Peter Howard Moore; 19 September 1946 (age 80); St Helens, Lancashire, England
- Other name: The Man In Black
- Penalty: Life imprisonment (whole life tariff)

Details
- Victims: 4
- Span of crimes: September – December 1995
- Country: United Kingdom

Peter Howard Moore (born 19 September 1946) is a British serial killer who managed cinemas in Bagillt, Holyhead, Kinmel Bay and Denbigh in North Wales at the time of his arrest. He murdered four men in 1995. Due to his trademark attire of a black shirt and tie, he was dubbed the "man in black".

== Background ==
Moore was born in St Helens and was raised in Kinmel Bay. As a child he attended Towyn Primary School and Dinorben Secondary Modern School. Moore's father ran a hardware shop out of their house in Denbighshire, and has been described by Moore as an "abusive alcoholic". He died in 1979, prompting Moore to take over the shop. Moore was close with his mother, living with her in the family home until her death in 1993.

Prior to his crimes Moore was well known in the North Wales area for his work restoring and running the Focus chain of cinemas. In 1991, he restored and reopened his first cinema in Bagillt. He went on to reopen the Empire Cinema in Holyhead on the 24 November 1994. The cinema had been closed for three years prior to Moore's renovations. On 4 August 1995 he reopened the 120 seat Futura Cinema in Denbigh. He also operated a cinema in Blaenau Ffestiniog.

Moore would buy second hand cinema equipment, and would restore it himself to keep costs down and ensure he could offer low ticket prices.

== Crimes ==
Henry John Roberts was a 56-year-old man who lived alone in Caergeiliog, Anglesey. There are conflicting stories about how Roberts was murdered, with Moore claiming he had never met Roberts before, while police have claimed he made contact with Roberts prior to his death. When Moore confessed, he told officers that he approached Roberts' house in a Nazi style hat, dark clothes, while holding a knife. Roberts came out of his house and began proclaiming that he wasn't Jewish before Moore stabbed him to death. However, a police officer involved in the case claimed that Moore faked a car breakdown outside Roberts' house and struck up a conversation. Roberts invited Moore in, and showed him his extensive Nazi memorabilia collection. Several days later Moore approached Roberts' house at night, wearing dark clothing to avoid being spotted. He drew Roberts outside by creating a loud noise, and then stabbed him to death.

Both sources agree that once Roberts was dead, Moore went through his house and stole one of Roberts' swastika flags. His body was discovered on his driveway by a neighbour. He had been stabbed over 20 times and his trousers pulled down. Several of the stab wounds were focused on Roberts' buttocks.

Keith Randles was a 49-year-old nightwatchman, who had been hired to protect machinery being used to repair the A55 road leading to Llangefni. Randles was staying on site in a caravan when Moore murdered him on the 29 November 1995. Moore told police he knocked on Randles' caravan and pulled him outside. Randles begged for his life and began fighting back while Moore repeatedly stabbed him. He told detectives that he attacked Randles as a form of stress relief, as he was worried about his financial situation.

Edward Carthy was a 28-year-old man who met Moore in the gay nightclub Paco in Liverpool. Carthy was intoxicated and asked Moore to drive him to his home in Birkenhead. But Moore took him to North Wales instead. Carthy panicked when he realised this and attempted to escape from the car while it was moving. Moore restrained him and stabbed Carthy to death and dumped his body in the Clocaenog Forest in October 1995.

Anthony Davies was a 40-year-old crematorium worker, who Moore stabbed to death on Pensarn Beach, Abergele on the 18 December 1995. Pensarn Beach car park was a well known spot for gay men who were cruising for sex, and Moore frequented the area often. On the 17 December Moore met Davies, whom he claimed he spoke to for a short amount of time before exposing himself to Moore. Moore stabbed Davies repeatedly. Davies fought back before he died, causing a deep cut on Moore's hand. The blood from this wound was later identified as belonging to Moore.

== Arrest and trial ==
=== Arrest ===
Moore was arrested on 21 December 1995, as part of the police investigation into the murder of Anthony Davies. Davies' body had been discovered on the 18 December by a dog walker on Pensarn beach. He had been stabbed sixteen times in the abdomen, and a van similar to Moore's had been witnessed near the scene before the body's discovery. Police searched his home, and found a bloody knife, and a collection of Nazi memorabilia. A search of the pond on his land discovered belongings stolen from all of his victims.

Police suspected Moore also committed the murders of Keith Randles and Anthony Davies due to his use of the A55 road to visit the various cinemas he owned. They knew that Roberts also collected Nazi memorabilia, strengthening their suspicions. Moore denied being involved in any of the murders.

On the 24 of December, in the early hours of the morning, Moore called police to his cell and informed them he would like to make a confession to four murders he'd committed. This included the murder of Edward Carthy, of which the police weren't aware. Moore provided them with a hand drawn map to help them locate Carthy's body in the Clocaenog Forest. The police found that Carthy's remains had been scavenged by animals, At the time of his arrest Moore had also been planning to kill the bank manager of the Abergele HSBC, due to his frustration over a large debt he owed the bank.

Moore also admitted to committing around 20 assaults, mostly on men, over the span of 20 years. He would drive around at night, dressed in a police or Nazi uniform, looking for someone walking alone whom he could attack. Moore would beat them with a police truncheon, and occasionally would masturbate on the victim before leaving. Later the same day, Moore recanted his confession, telling police and his solicitor that he didn't commit the crimes, but rather his boyfriend Jason did.

=== Trial ===
Moore's trial began on 11 November 1996 with Moore pleading not guilty to all charges. Alex Carlile lead the prosecution, introducing the "man in black" moniker during his opening speech.

Moore took the stand in his own defence, telling the jury that the crimes were committed by his boyfriend, Alan Williams, whom he called Jason. The nickname was believed to be a reference to the killer in the Friday the 13th horror films. Moore claimed Jason was a 48-year-old hotel worker who worked at the Empire Hotel in Llandudno and that they had met when Moore was cruising for sex on a beach in 1995. The police searched extensively for Jason, requesting guest and employee records from every hotel in the Llandudno area. Moore claimed he had been at the scenes of all the murders, but didn't participate. He claimed that the confession he had given to police was false, and that he'd done it to waste time and ensure that Jason could escape justice.

On the stand he admitted to sexually assaulting men, and being involved in the gay sado-masochistic scene in Wales. One anonymous victim of Moore's assaults spoke during his trial, sharing how Moore approached him in the Pensarn beach car park on 22 September 1993. The man told Moore they preferred women, at which point Moore went to his car to retrieve a pair of handcuffs. Moore told the victim he was being arrested and handcuffed him. The victim was able to escape but returned when he saw Moore stealing his belongings from his parked car. Moore then attacked him with a truncheon, causing the victim to run for help.

The jury found him guilty on all counts. He was sentenced to life imprisonment in November 1996 with a recommendation that he never be released.

== Life sentence ==
In 2004 Moore attempted to publish an advert in the Daily Post appealing for witnesses who could help him overturn his convictions. The newspaper refused to publish the advert.

Moore sued his neighbours in 2000 for theft. In court Moore stated that he had allowed the couple to move into his home in 1996 on the agreement that they take care of the property. He agreed that they could sell some of his items but later found out that all his belongings had been sold. Moore won his case and was awarded £12,842 in damages. In 2001 he attempted to sue North Wales Police for £165,000 damages incurred during their 1995 search of the property, and for failing to protect his property while he was in prison. The case was thrown out by the district judge and did not go to trial.

During his time in Wakefield Prison, Moore befriended fellow serial killer Harold Shipman. Moore would call him "The Doctor", and often spoke about Shipman's English Literature course that he was taking at the prison. When Shipman committed suicide in January 2004, Moore was called upon for evidence in Shipman's inquest. He was one of the last people to speak to Shipman before his death.

In June 2008, Moore was told by the High Court that he would spend the rest of his life in prison. On 3 March 2011, Moore challenged the ruling in the European Court of Human Rights (ECHR), with a view to having his sentence quashed and such whole life order sentences outlawed throughout Europe. On 17 January 2012, it was announced that his appeal had failed. However, on 9 July 2013, it was announced the ECHR had ruled there had to be both a possibility of release and review to be compatible with human rights.

In February 2015, the ECHR upheld the lawfulness of whole life orders, on the ground that they can be reviewed in exceptional circumstances, following a fresh challenge by murderer Arthur Hutchinson, who had been sentenced to life imprisonment for a triple murder in Sheffield more than 30 years earlier. There are around 70 prisoners in England and Wales serving whole life sentences.

== Other ==
On 13 October 2011, it was falsely reported that Moore had died at Broadmoor hospital on 30 July 2011.

Moore told police that he knew the identity of Clocaenog Forest Man. Police investigated this theory but discounted it due to the victim's clothing being manufactured after Moore had already been arrested.

== See also ==
- List of serial killers in the United Kingdom
- Colin Norris – Gay UK serial killer, convicted in 2008
