= Tomos Prys =

Welsh soldier, sailor and poet

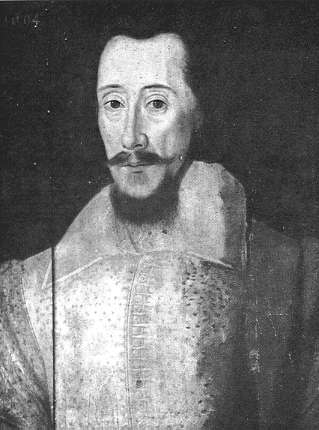
Tomos Prys

Tomos Prys (c.1564–1634) was a Welsh soldier, sailor and poet. He was the eldest son of Ellis Price MP, of Plas Iolyn, Pentrefoelas, Denbighshire.

== Life ==
He followed a seafaring life for many years, joining expeditions under both Sir Walter Raleigh and Sir Francis Drake. In one of his poems he states that he, Captain William Myddelton and Captain Thomas Koet were the first who 'drank' (smoked) tobacco in the streets of London. He fought in the campaign in the Netherlands between 1585 and 1587 under Robert Dudley, 1st Earl of Leicester, and was also with the earl at Tilbury in the army that protected London from the Spanish Armada in 1588. He was also occupied as a buccaneer; at the end of the 16th century he bought a ship and went buccaneering on the Spanish sea routes from the Llŷn coast, having built a residence out of the ruins of the old monastery on Bardsey Island.

On his death, Prys was buried at Ysbyty Ifan on 23 August 1634.

== Works ==
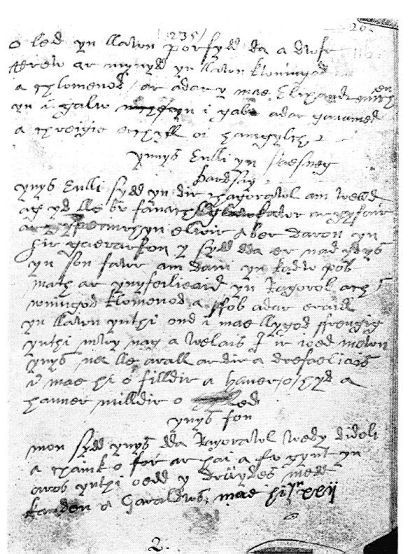
Manuscript by Prys

Many details survive about Tomos's life, recorded in his poems, of which more than two hundred are extant. Many of these poems describe his adventures as a soldier who faced the Spanish Armada and fought in the French Wars of Religion.

A poem written by Tomos at Plas Iolyn in his later life:

Traetha fy mod, lle nodant
I'm plwy gyda'm gwraig a'm plant
Ag a'm bryd, dros ennyd aeth
Is mynydd ar ysmonaeth

Translation:

Now I live quietly
With my dear wife and family
And for a while at least I till
My fields below the neighbouring hill.

== Family ==
Prys was twice married; firstly to Margaret, the daughter of William Griffith of Caernarvon, with whom he had three children, and secondly to Jane, the daughter of Hugh Gwynn of Berth-ddu and Bodysgallen, with whom he had ten children. According to his will, he disinherited his eldest son, Thomas, for marrying without his consent, so the manor of Ysbyty Ifan was left to the eldest son by his second wife, Robert.
