= Rhys Fawr ap Maredudd =

Welsh nobleman and soldier

- Born: c. 15th century
- Died: 1510
- Spouse: Lowri
- Military career
- Allegiance: Henry VII of England
- Service years: 1485–1510
- Conflicts: Battle of Bosworth Field

Rhys Fawr ap Maredudd (fl. 1485–1510) was a Welsh nobleman chiefly known for his valour at the Battle of Bosworth Field in 1485, where he fought on the side of Henry VII.

After Henry's landing at Milford Haven in early August 1485, his army was bolstered by contingents from across Wales. One of these contingents was that of Rhys, who had travelled from north Wales to meet Henry, probably near Welshpool; certainly, Rhys had joined him by the time Henry captured Shrewsbury in mid-August. On 22 August, Rhys and his men participated in the battle at Bosworth. At the height of the fighting, Henry's standard bearer, Sir William Brandon, was killed; according to later testimony, Rhys picked up the standard, hoisting it high until the conclusion of the battle.

He lived at Plas Iolyn, near Ysbyty Ifan in north Wales, and his effigy, along with that of his wife, Lowri, can be seen in the parish church of Ysbyty Ifan, Denbighshire. His son, Robert ap Rhys, was chaplain to Cardinal Wolsey and his grandson, Ellis Price, was MP for Merioneth.
