= You Gotta Problem with Me =

Studio album by Julian Cope
- Released: 6 August 2007
- Genre: Rock, garage rock
- Length: 56:44
- Label: Head Heritage
- Producer: Julian Cope

Julian Cope chronology
Dark Orgasm (2005)	You Gotta Problem with Me (2007)	Black Sheep (2008)

Professional ratings
Review scores
Source	Rating
AllMusic	3.5/5 stars
The Observer	4/5 stars
Record Collector	4/5 stars
Uncut	4/5 stars

You Gotta Problem with Me is the twenty-third solo album by Julian Cope, released in 2007.

Released across two CDs of 27 and 29 minutes respectively, You Gotta Problem with Me covers subject matter from corporate greed to celebrity culture, religion, misogyny, homophobia, and the Iraq War. Musically, the album ranges from garage rock on songs like the title track and "Peggy Suicide is a Junkie" to acoustic ballads like "Woden" and "A Child is Born in Cerrig-Y-Drudion."

== Track listing ==
All tracks are written by Julian Cope.

Disc one
No.	Title	Length
1.	"Doctor Know"	9:00
2.	"Beyond Rome"	2:14
3.	"Soon to Forget Ya"	2:17
4.	"You Gotta Problem With Me"	4:27
5.	"They Gotta Different Way of Doing Things"	6:24
6.	"Peggy Suicide is a Junkie"	4:54
Total length:		29:18

Disc two
No.	Title	Length
1.	"A Child is Born in Cerrig-Y-Drudion"	3:16
2.	"Woden"	4:50
3.	"Sick Love"	2:37
4.	"Can't Get You Out of My Country"	4:59
5.	"Vampire State Building"	4:04
6.	"Hidden Doorways"	3:31
7.	"Shame Shame Shame"	4:00
Total length:		27:26 (56:44)

Poetry (printed in booklet)
No.	Title	Length
1.	"Sometimes We Build a Wall"

== Personnel ==
Musicians

- Julian Cope — vocals, guitar, bass, Mellotron, Moog, Korg synthesizer
- Anthony "Doggen" Foster — guitar, bass, harmonica
- Ian "Mister E." Bissett – drums
- Donald Ross Skinner — programming, drums, guitar
- Chris Olley — Korg synthesizer, programming

Technical

- Julian Cope – producer, directed by
- Terry Dobbin — recorded by
- Chris Olley – recorded by, mastering engineer
- Donald Ross Skinner – recorded by
- Benji Bartlett – photography
- Lady V – photography
- Christopher Patrick "Holy" McGrail — design
