= Alwen Reservoir =

Reservoir in Conwy, North Wales

- Cronfa Alwen (Welsh); Cronfa Alwen Reservoir
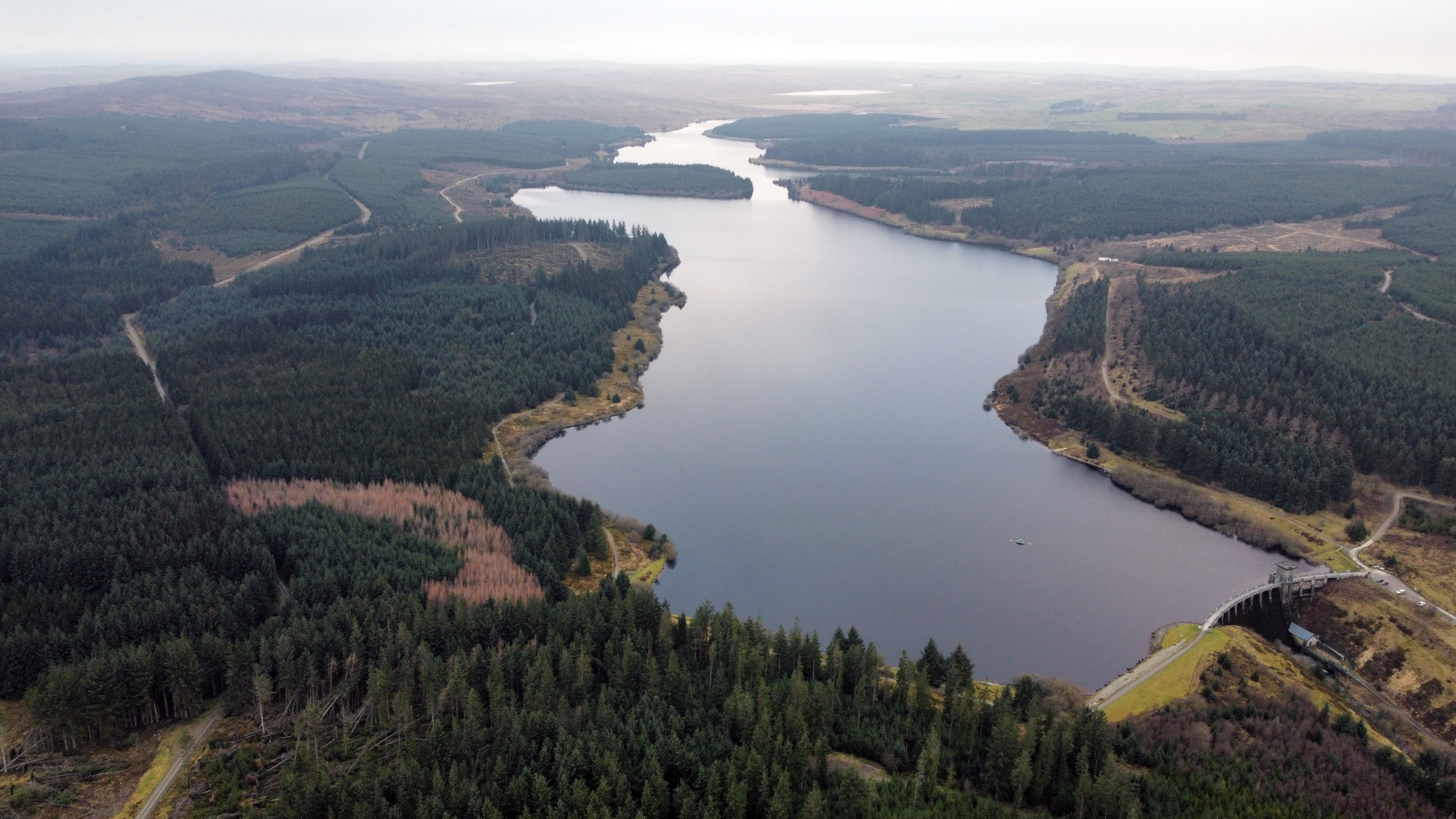

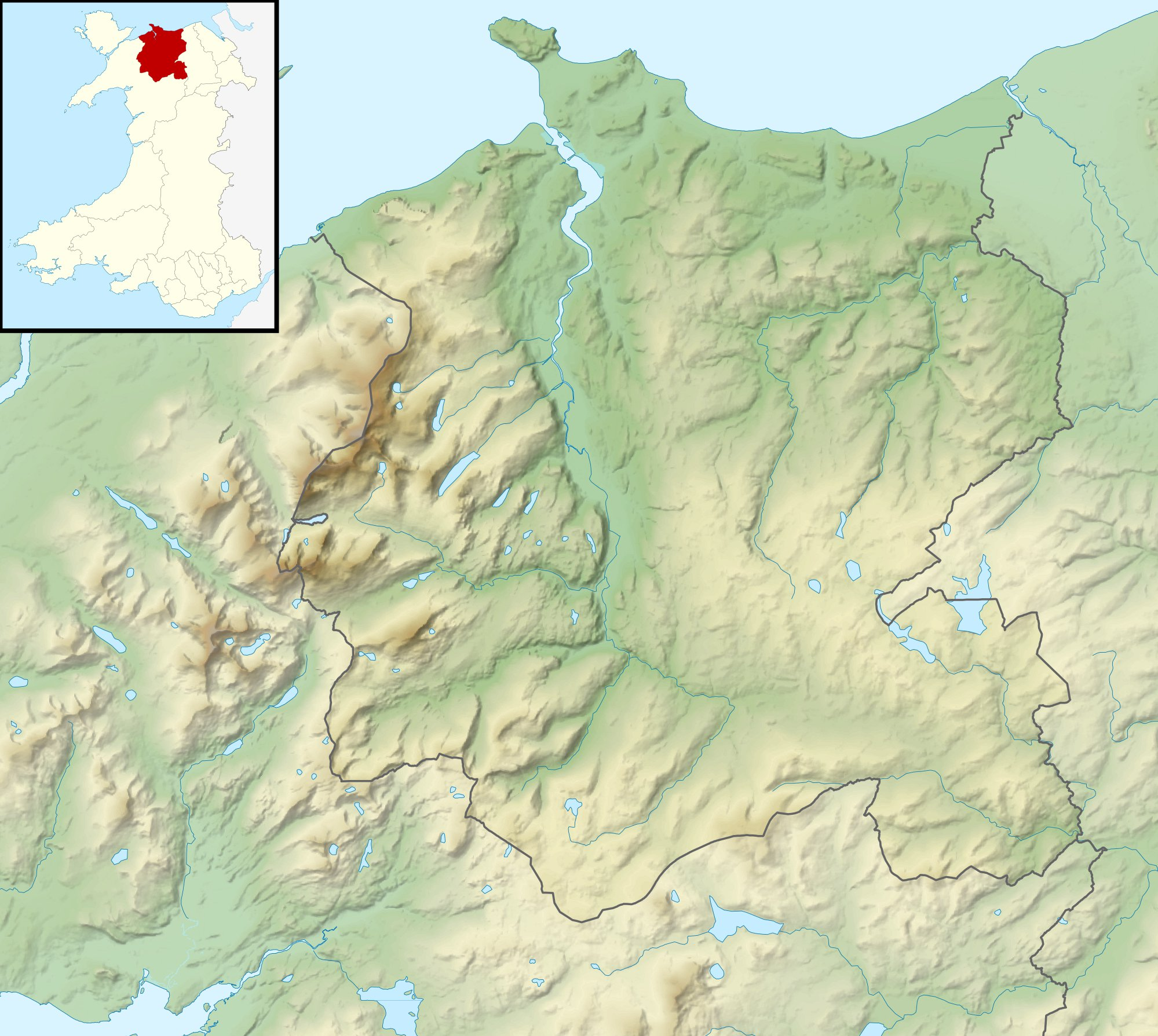
- Location within Conwy
- Location: Conwy County Borough, Wales
- Coordinates: 53°04′N 3°34′W
- Lake type: Reservoir
- Basin countries: Wales
- Max. length: 5 km (3.1 mi)

The Alwen Reservoir (Welsh: Cronfa Alwen) is a 5 kilometres (3 mi) long reservoir near Pentre-Llyn-Cymmer in Conwy County Borough, Wales.

== History ==
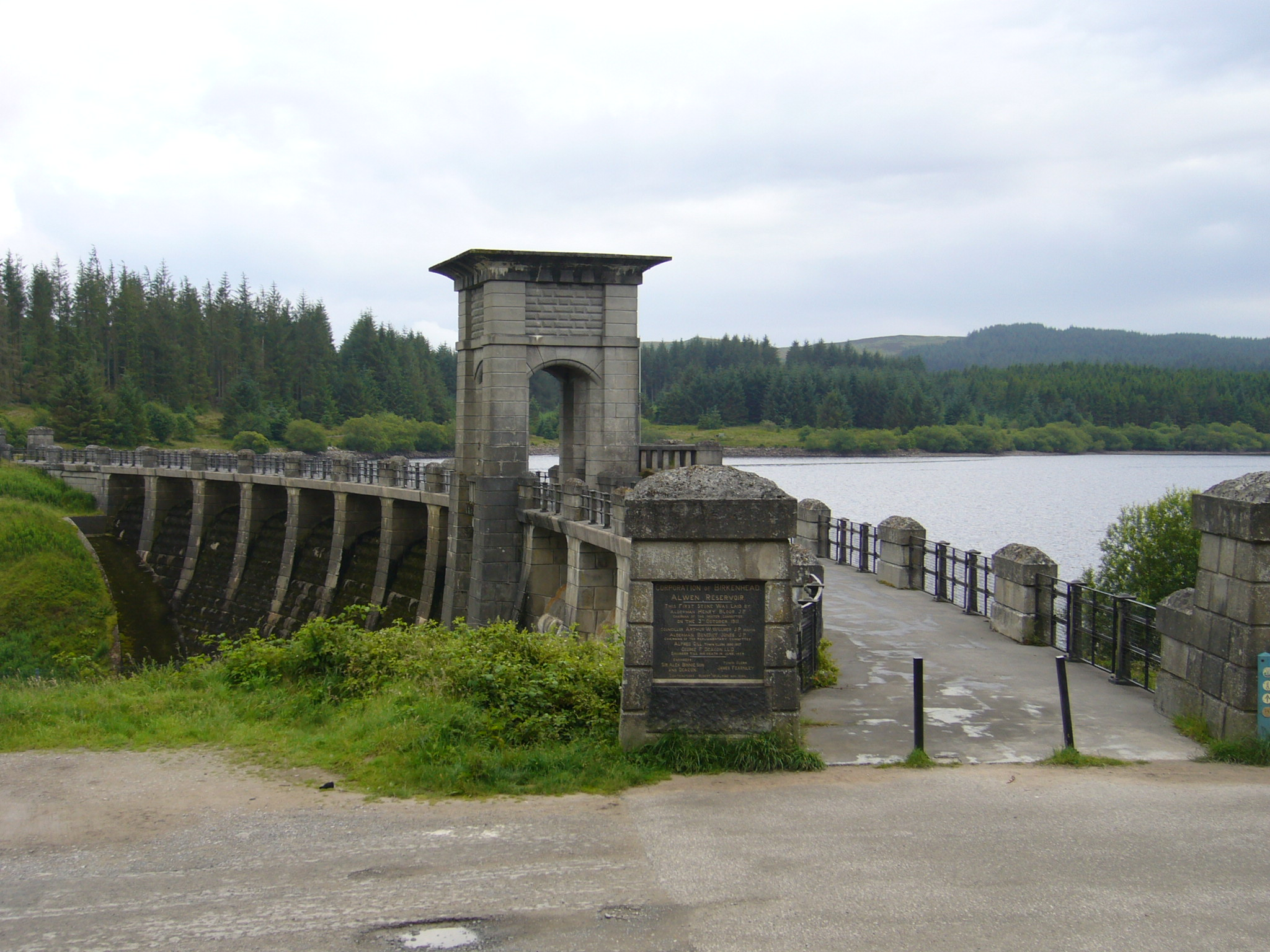
The dam

The reservoir and dam were constructed between 1911 and 1920 by Alexander Binnie, Son and Deacon (Resident Engineer John M. Parkin Assoc M.Inst. C.E.) for the Corporation of Birkenhead to provide a high quality source of drinking water for the Wirral and parts of Liverpool. The reservoir and dam were built with the authority of an act of Parliament and although the scheme involved flooding a long valley in central North Wales, the scheme encountered no opposition from local people. An original filter works building enclosing sixteen batteries of six Bell's Patent Filters is now vacant with a modern treatment plant some 100 metres distant. The treatment plant and piped aqueduct continue to supply Birkenhead with water and, despite the proximity of this reservoir to the other River Dee reservoirs, Llyn Celyn, Llyn Brenig and Llyn Tegid (Bala Lake), it is not part of the Dee Regulation Scheme and its abstraction is not limited in the same ways as the other sources. It is the only reservoir in the Dee system providing a direct piped supply of water.

== Location ==
The bulk of the reservoir lies in Cerrigydrudion community, while the northern arm forms the boundary between Pentrefoelas, to the west, and Llansannan and Nantglyn, to the north and east. It is held back by the 27 metres (89 ft) high Alwen Dam, which impounds Afon Alwen, and is 9 kilometres (5.6 mi) downstream from Llyn Alwen, a natural lake at the head of the catchment. It was built between 1909 and 1921, originally to supply water to the town of Birkenhead, near Liverpool in England.

The dam is a gravity-arch masonry dam. The "first stone" of the dam records that the engineers were Alex Binnie and George Deacon and the contractors were Sir Robert McAlpine. A large water treatment facility was built below the dam, and a cast iron underground aqueduct laid to Birkenhead. The original water treatment buildings are still standing, but the equipment inside has long gone, replaced by modern plant in a new building.

The operators, Welsh Water have a scheme to teach children about the importance of water, linked to the National Curriculum Key Stage 2 and offer an on-site classroom and guided tours of the water treatment works to schools. The nearby Outdoor Education Centre at Pentre-Llyn-Cymmer accommodates children during school trips.

The reservoir is very close to Llyn Brenig. It is at the end of a valley, and has no through routes around it for vehicles. However the reservoir has an extensive network of trails (public footpaths as well as forest roads suitable for horse riding, mountain biking and walking).

Footpaths around the reservoir were upgraded in 2005 and 2006, providing better access to the general public and allowing greater exploration of the North and South Alwen forests.

Fishing is permitted through permit (which can be purchased from the visitors centre at the nearby Llyn Brenig visitors centre).

== Access ==
Access is via the B4501, turning north off the A5 at Cerrig-y-drudion.
