= Llyn Alwen =

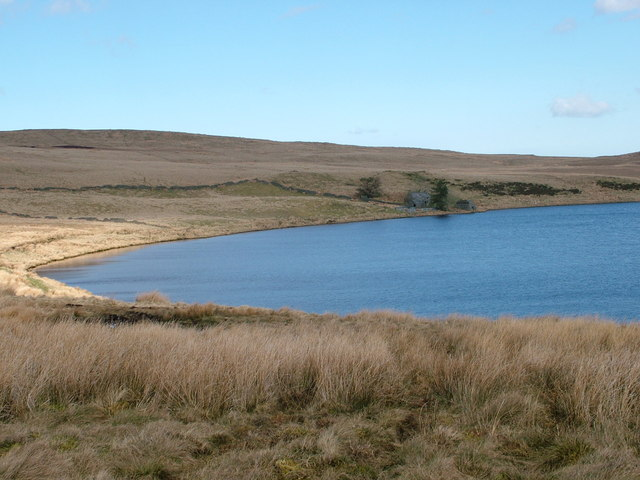
- Llyn Alwen

- Location within Wales
- Location: Mynydd Hiraethog, Conwy County Borough, Wales
- Coordinates: 53.0947°N 3.6474°W
- Type: lake

Llyn Alwen is a small natural upland lake on Mynydd Hiraethog in Conwy County Borough, Wales at SH 897 565. It lies on the rolling Silurian moorland to the north-west of Mwdwl-eithin and about 10 km to the east of Betws y Coed. The discharge from the lake flows under the A543 road to form the headwater of Alwen Reservoir. The area was used as a special stage during the 2015 Wales Rally GB.
