= Denbigh Moors =

Region in Conwy and Denbighshire, Wales

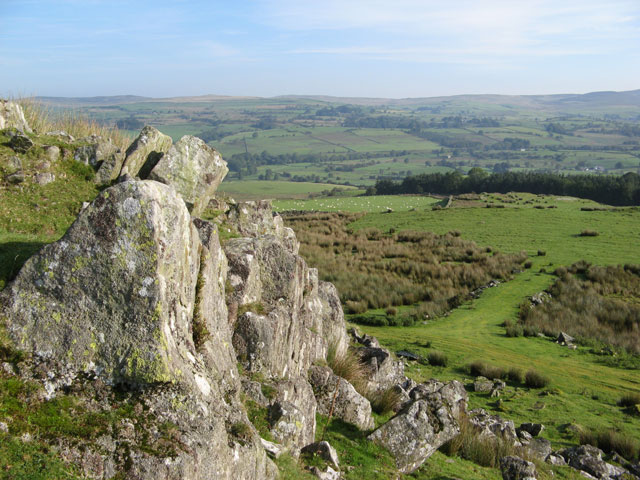
Looking towards the Moors alongside a quarried outcrop

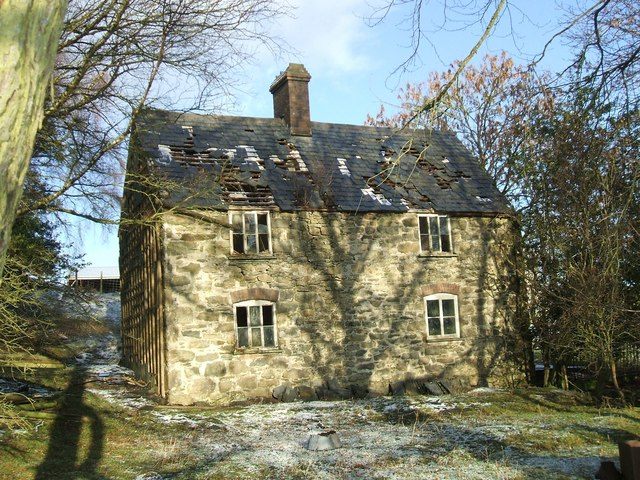
A ruined house on the Clwydian Way, on the Denbigh Moors south of the village of Cyffylliog in Denbighshire

The Denbigh Moors (Welsh: Mynydd Hiraethog) are an upland region in Conwy and Denbighshire in the north of Wales, between Snowdonia and the Clwydian Range. It includes the large reservoirs Llyn Brenig and Llyn Alwen, and the Clocaenog Forest, which has one of Wales's last populations of red squirrels. It also contains the open heath Hafod Elwy Moor National Nature Reserve.

Its highest point is Mwdwl-eithin, at 532 metres (1,745 ft) above sea level, making it higher than Exmoor. Another summit is Moel Seisiog, at 467 metres (1,532 ft), which is also the source of the River Elwy (53°05′N 3°42′W). On its western edge, overlooking the Conwy Valley, lies the Moel Maelogan wind farm. Three other summits reach over 500 metres – Craig Bron-banog (502 metres), Gorsedd Bran (518 metres), and Foel Goch (Marial Gwyn) (519 metres).

The ruined hunting lodge of Gwylfa Hiraethog (known locally as Plas Pren due to its original timber construction) lies at a height of 498 metres (1633 feet). Built by the grocery tycoon Hudson Kearley, it lies on the moors, and nearby is one of the highest inns in Britain, the Sportsmans Arms (Welsh: Tafarn yr Heliwr). As well as the large reservoirs of Llyn Brenig and Alwen Reservoir there are two sizeable natural lakes – Llyn Alwen and Llyn Aled, and two small ones, Llyn Bran and Llyn y Foel-frech – as well as another reservoir, Aled Isaf Reservoir (lower Aled Reservoir).

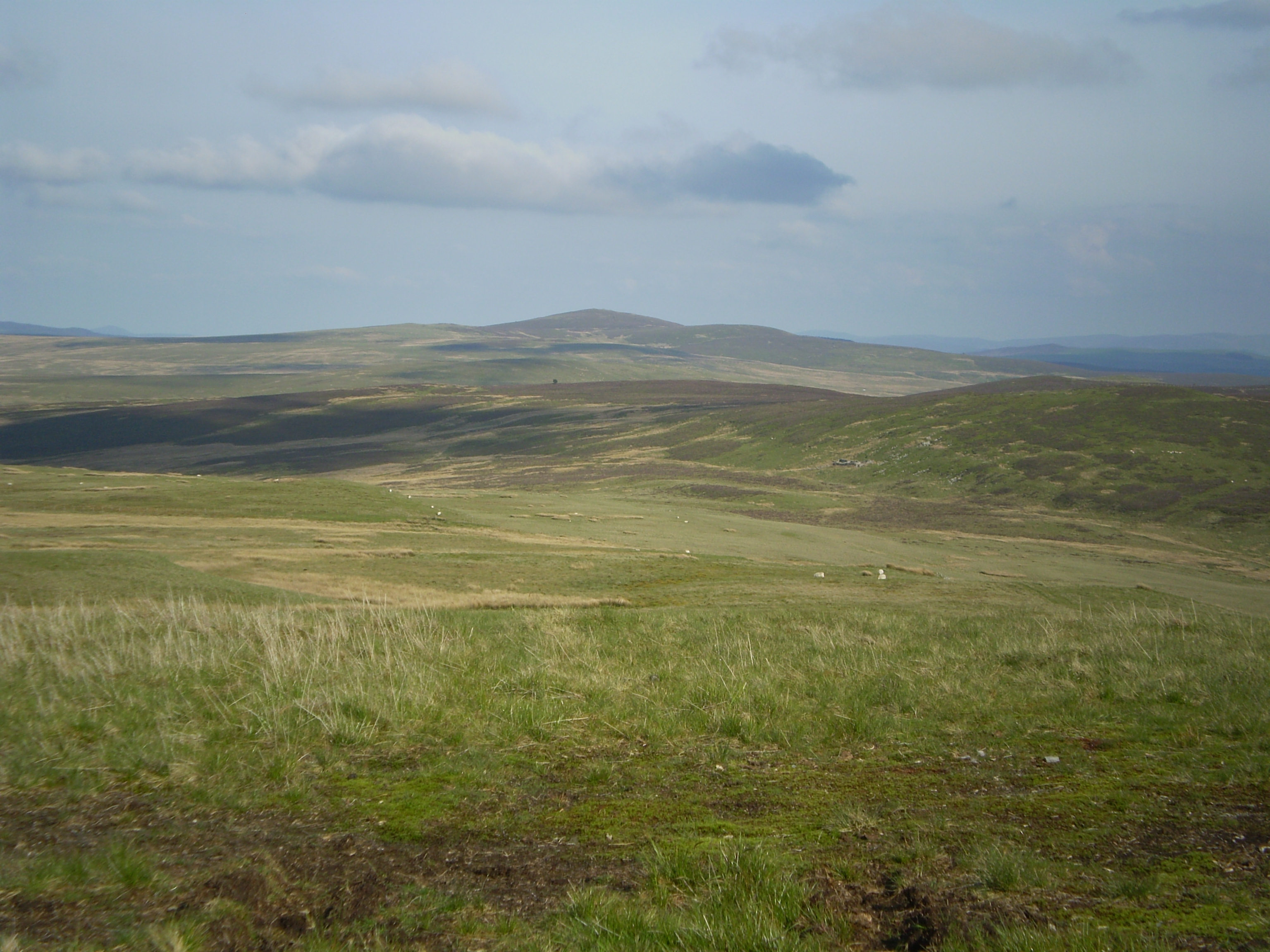
View to Moel Llyn from Moel Seisiog
