= Ysbyty Ifan =

Village and community in Conwy, Wales

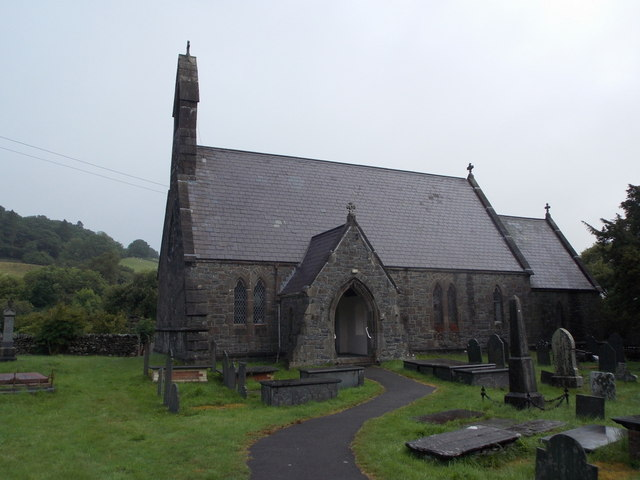
- St John's Church at Ysbyty Ifan

- Location within Conwy
- Area: 67.99 km^{2} (26.25 sq mi)
- Population: 196 (in 2011)
  - Density: 3/km^{2} (7.8/sq mi)
- OS grid reference: SH841488
- Community: Ysbyty Ifan
- Principal area: Conwy
- Preserved county: Clwyd
- Country: Wales
- Sovereign state: United Kingdom
- Post town: BETWS-Y-COED
- Postcode district: LL24
- Dialling code: 01690
- Police: North Wales
- Fire: North Wales
- Ambulance: Welsh
- UK Parliament: Bangor Aberconwy
- Senedd Cymru – Welsh Parliament: Aberconwy
- List of places UK Wales Conwy 53.024°N 3.728°W Map of the community

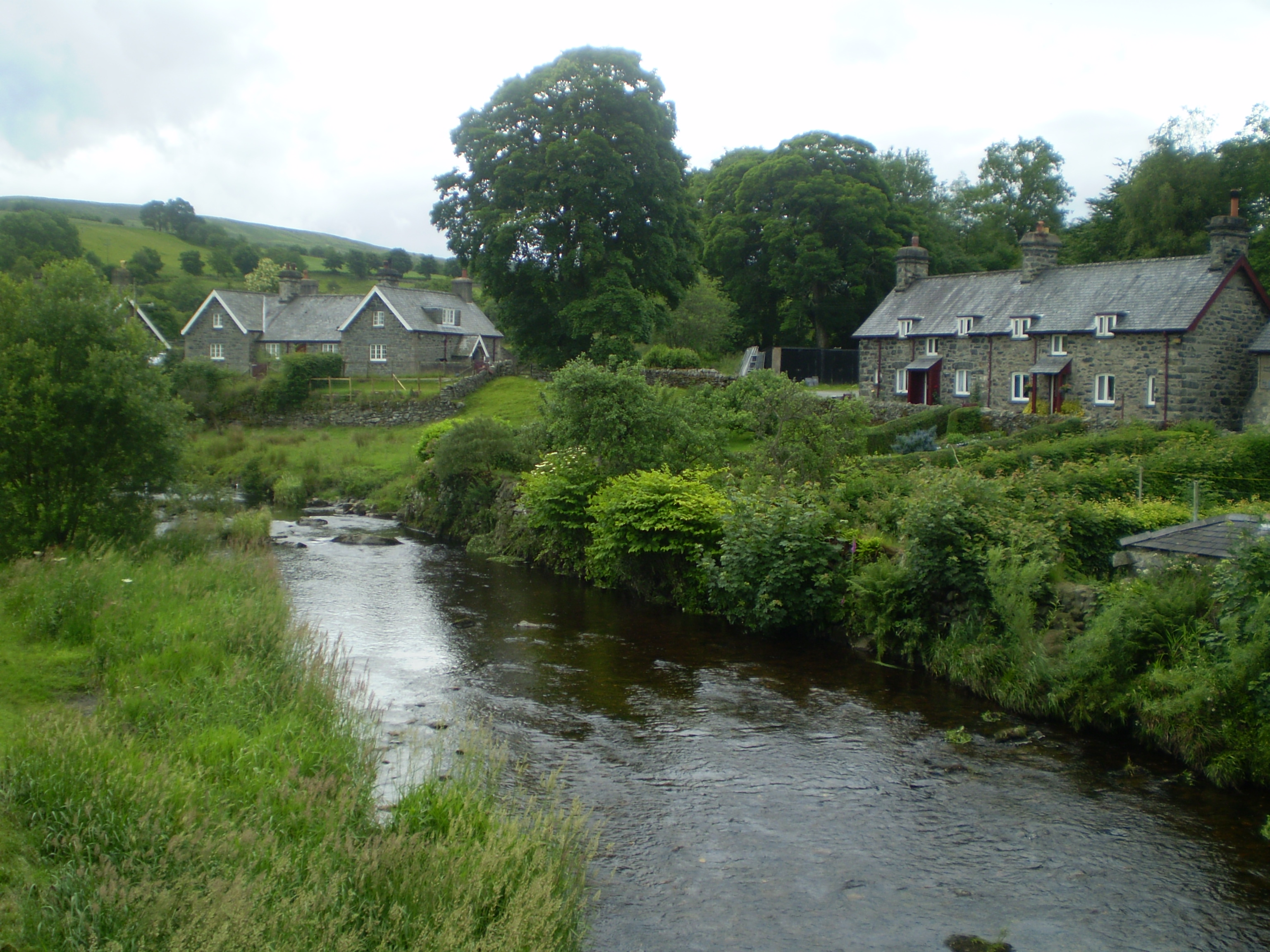
Ysbyty Ifan and River Conwy

Ysbyty Ifan (formerly anglicised as Yspytty Ifan) is a small, historic village and community in the Conwy County Borough of Wales. Throughout the Late Medieval Period, it was a settlement controlled by the Knights of St John (the Order of Hospitallers). It had a hospital and a hostel which provided care to pilgrims visiting Welsh religious sites in North Wales.

In 2011 the village had a population of 196 in 76 households (29 household spaces had no usual residents); over 79% of the population were able to speak Welsh. It has one of the smallest populations of any Welsh community, the smallest being Ganllwyd. It is in the electoral ward of Uwch Conwy.

== Toponym ==
The village was originally known as Dôl Gynwal (Welsh for 'Cynwal's meadow') until the late 13th Century. Its name became Ysbyty Ifan when the Knights of St John established a hospital to care for pilgrims who were visiting holy sites throughout North Wales (see: North Wales Pilgrim's Way). Ysbyty Ifan means "hospital of St John".

== History ==
Some pilgrimage sites (with links) around Ysbyty Ifan

In c. 1190, the Knights of St John established a hospital and a hostel to care for pilgrims journeying through the area. Ysbyty Ifan was centrally located on an ancient pilgrimage route from Bangor Is Coed (Bangor-on-Dee) to Holyhead and Bardsey Island and the Cistercian Way between Aberconwy and Cymer.

In the 15th century, the Red Bandits of Mawddwy used Ysbyty Ifan as a hideout, taking advantage of the Knights' privilege of sanctuary.

The Knights Hospitallers' hospital was closed in 1540 during the Dissolution of the Monasteries; the village's Church of St John stands on the site. Effigies in the church are said to depict Rhys Fawr ap Maredudd (fl. 1485–1510), a local nobleman who served Henry VII at the Battle of Bosworth, his wife Lowri, and his son Robert, chaplain to Cardinal Wolsey.

The poet William Cynwal was buried in Ysbyty Ifan in about 1588. He was a disciple of Gruffudd Hiraethog and took part in the second Caerwys eisteddfod in 1568.

Prior to the construction of Thomas Telford's Holyhead road in the 19th Century, the medieval bridge at Ysbyty Ifan was an important crossing of the Afon Conwy. It was bypassed when Waterloo Bridge, Betws-y-Coed on Telford's road opened in 1815.

Clough Williams-Ellis designed Voelas, a small country house, for Colonel John Wynne-Finch in the late 1950s. The house is a Grade II* listed building and its gardens and grounds are listed, also at Grade II* on the Cadw/ICOMOS Register of Parks and Gardens of Special Historic Interest in Wales.

== Modern amenities ==
Ysbyty Ifan has a primary school with two classrooms and a cafeteria. The village also has a rugby union pitch with a children's playground.

The Ysbyty Ifan Estate is the largest single estate looked after by the National Trust. The area of the estate is over 8,000 hectares and includes moorland, river valleys and hill farms. The Migneint is an area of moorland and bog designated as a Site of Special Scientific Interest (SSSI). The Trust is responsible for a number of holiday cottages within the estate including Foel-Gopyn, which is off the grid.

There are also a number of other places of interest near Ysbyty Ifan, so the area attracts a large number of visitors including walkers, especially during the summer months. Curlews, whose numbers are under pressure, have been seen nesting and visiting the Ysbyty Ifan area in recent years.

Ysbyty Ifan is part of the Uwch Conwy ward for elections to Conwy County Borough Council.

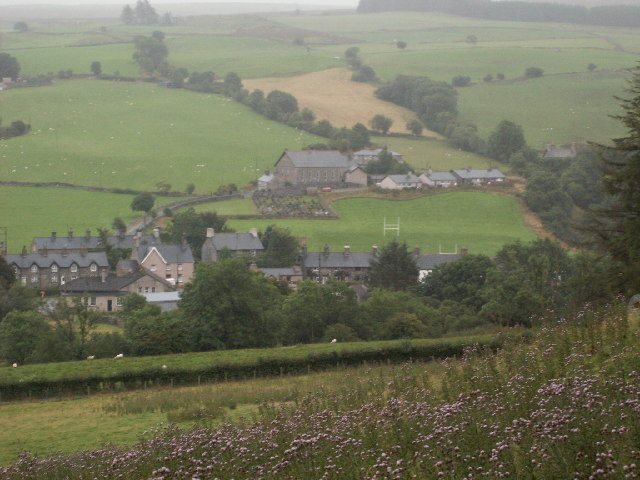
Ysbyty Ifan

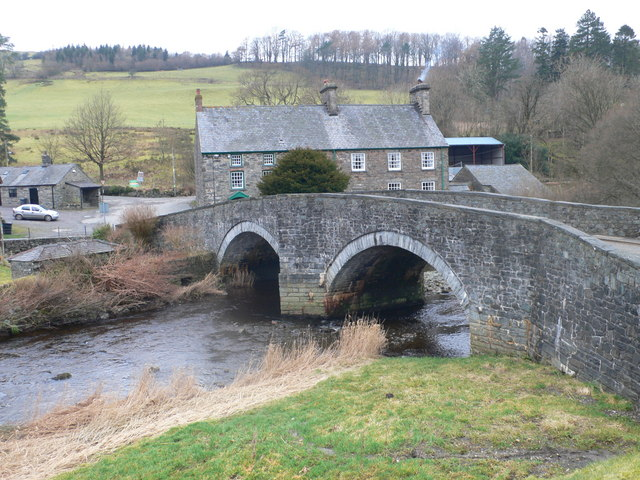
Bridge over the Conwy

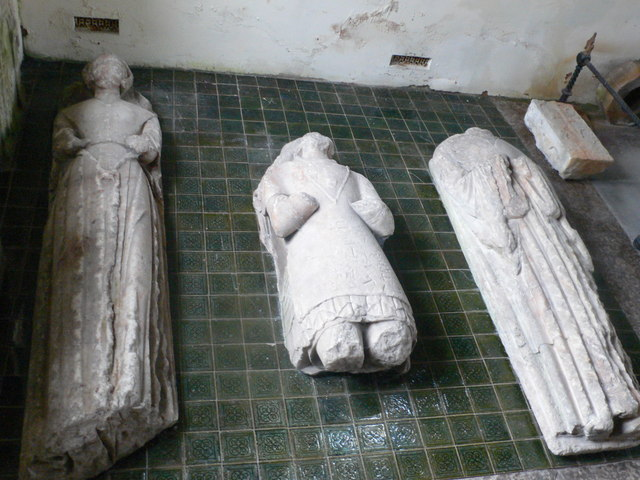
Effigies in the church of Rhys Fawr and Lowri, and their son Robert

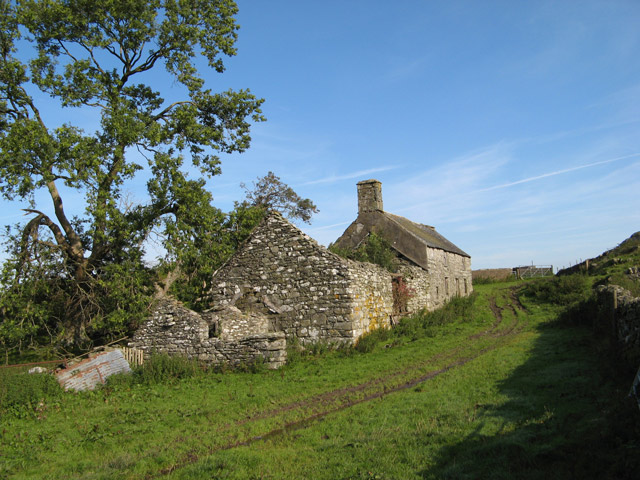
Bryn Gwyn

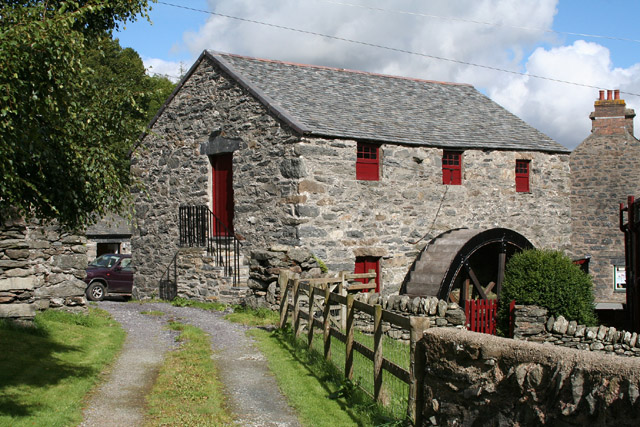
Ysbyty Ifan watermill

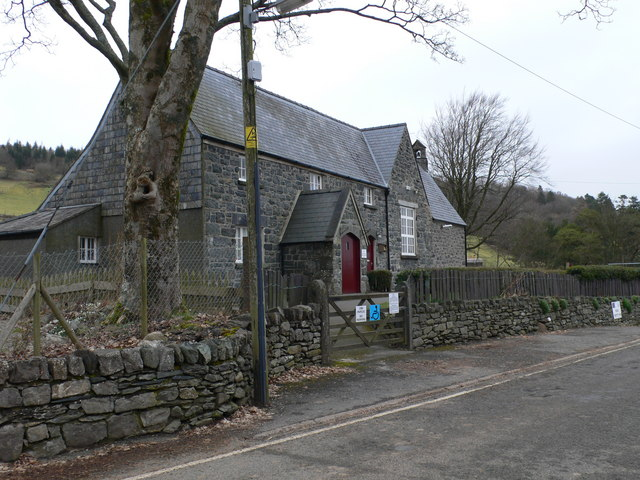
Ysbyty Ifan Primary School

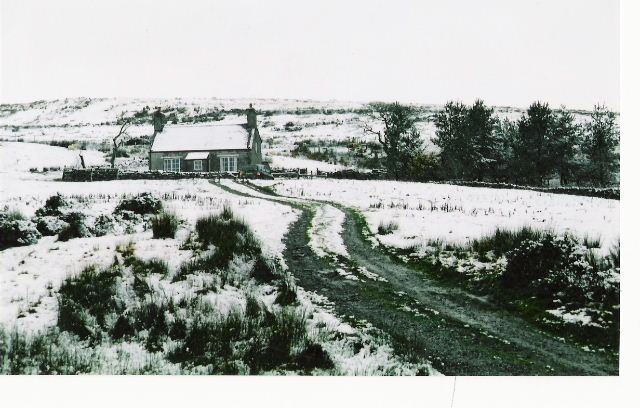
Foel-Gopyn Cottage

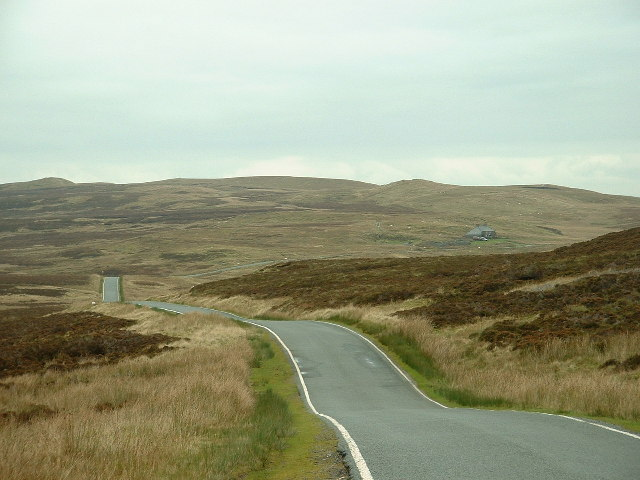
Moorland of Migneint (on B4409 looking NE)

== Notable burials ==
- Tomos Prys, sailor, buccaneer and poet, was buried in Ysbyty Ifan on 23 August 1634.
- Abraham Lincoln's great, great-grandfather, John Morris, lived in Bryn Gwyn, a farmhouse in Ysbyty Ifan which is now derelict. His daughter emigrated to Pennsylvania in the United States with a group of Quakers in the 17th century.
- Orig Williams, notable independent wrestling promoter and host of long-running Welsh wrestling show Reslo, was born in Ysbyty Ifan, with a plaque erected in his memory.
- Siôn Dafydd Berson (c.1675-1769), poet, clog maker and lay reader, was buried in Ysbyty Ifan cemetery in 1769. Dafydd is mainly remembered as the person who taught Twm o'r Nant to read and write. The inscription on his grave, by Twm o'r Nant, says "Galar, i'r ddaear ddu - aeth athraw..." (Oh grief, into the black earth - goes the teacher...)
- Gwallter Mechain, the Welsh bard, was made curate of Ysbyty Ifan in 1799.
