= Llyn Brenig =

Artificial lake in Cerrigydrudion, north Wales

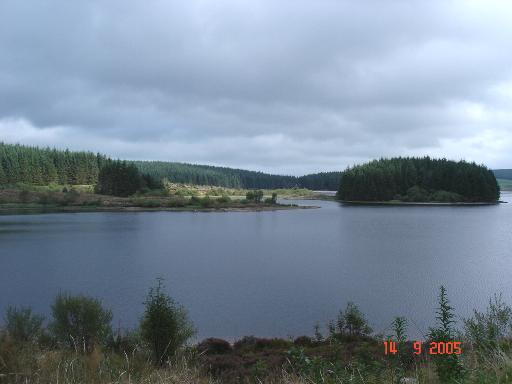

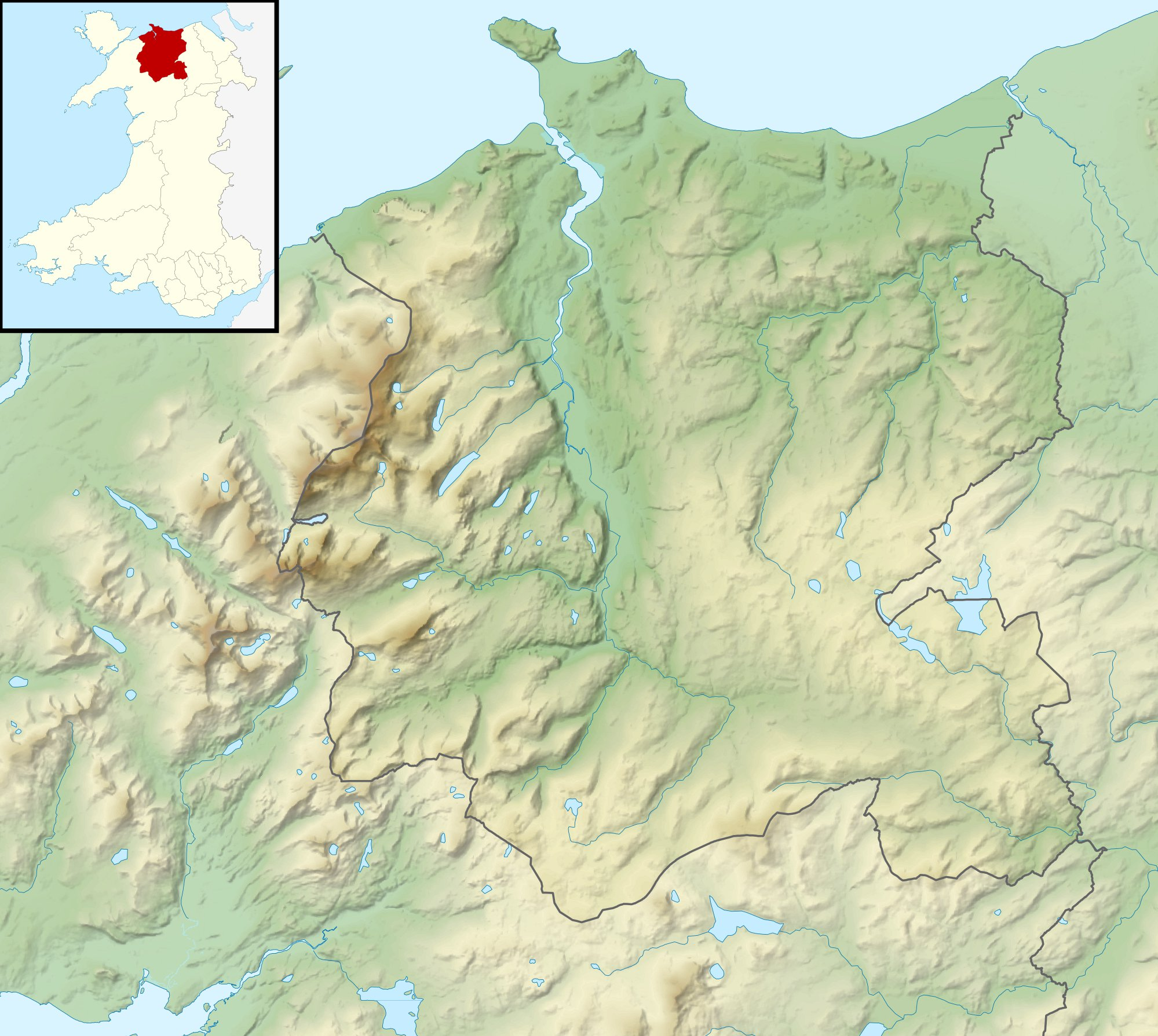
- Location within Conwy
- Location: Conwy & Denbighshire
- Coordinates: 53°05′N 3°32′W
- Type: reservoir
- Basin countries: United Kingdom
- Max. length: 4 km (2.5 mi)
- Max. width: 1.6 km (0.99 mi)
- Surface area: 920 acres (3.7 km^{2})
- Shore length^{1}: 9 mi (14 km)
- ^{1} Shore length is not a well-defined measure.

Llyn Brenig is a reservoir located in the Denbigh Moors in North Wales. The artificial lake, which was constructed between 1973 and 1976, was created by building an embankment dam across the Brenig valley. It lies at 1,200 ft (370 m) above sea level on the border between the counties of Conwy and Denbighshire. It is used to manage the flow in the River Dee as part of the River Dee regulation system.

The reservoir's purpose is to protect the water supply for North West England and north-east Wales, particularly Liverpool and its surrounding area. Its surface area of 920 acres (3.7 km^{2}) makes it the fourth largest lake in Wales, behind Llyn Tegid (Bala Lake), Llyn Trawsfynydd and Lake Vyrnwy.

== History ==
Construction began in 1973 and was completed in 1976. An earthen bank with stone, which is up to 45 m (148 ft) at its highest point, dammed Afon Brenig near the village of Pentre-Llyn-Cymmer, Cerrigydrudion. The northern half of the reservoir is in community of Nantglyn. Its perimeter is about 9 miles (14 km).

Brenig, which has a capacity of 60 million m³, was first filled in 1979. Water supply of the catchment into the lake is significantly "over-reservoired", this means the catchment area of Llyn Brenig does not have capacity to refill the reservoir within one annual hydrological cycle. It can take several years for the reservoir to refill again after its water level have been drawn down. Water is only drawn from Llyn Brenig during drought conditions when Llyn Celyn and Bala Lake are no longer predicted to be capable of maintaining the flow in the River Dee.

The lake holds a commercial trout farm and commercial logging is conducted around parts of the lake.

== Leisure ==
Llyn Brenig is a popular destination for outward bound activities such as hiking and mountain biking, fishing and watersports. It has a visitor centre and cafe.

=== Watersport activities ===
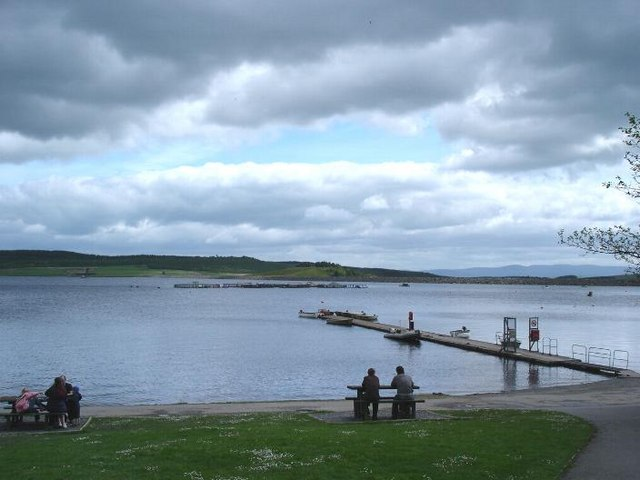
Leisure craft moored on the reservoir

Fishing, canoeing, paddle boarding and open water swimming are all permitted on the lake. Power craft for angling and recreation are available for hire, while Llyn Brenig has its own sailing club. In 1990 Llyn Brenig was the only Welsh reservoir used for the World Fly Fishing Championships.

=== Archeology ===
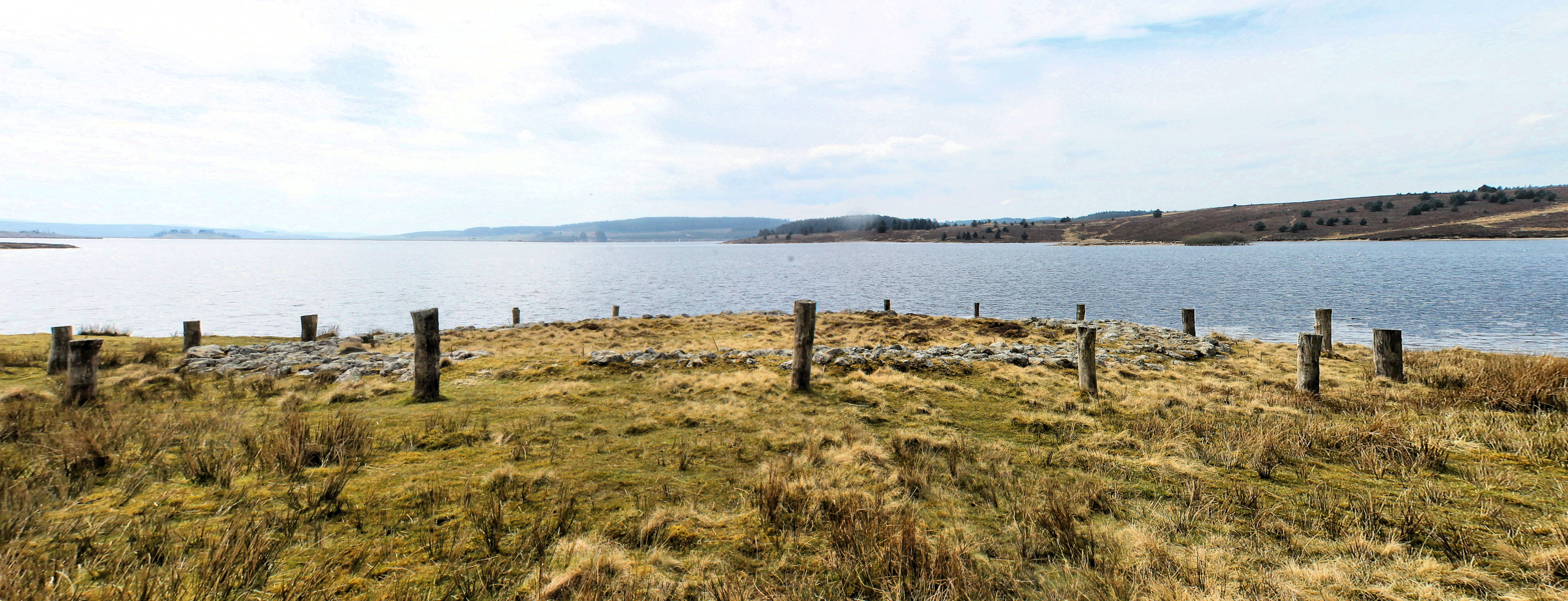
A Bronze Age stone circle next to Llyn Brenig

During construction of the Llyn Brenig, archeologists found that the Afon Brenig valley had been used for thousand of years by upland communities crossing the Denbigh Moors. Finds included a camp used by Mesolithic people (radiocarbon analysis of the charcoal from their fires to around 5700 BC), Bronze Age artefacts, a ring cairn (a Bronze Age burial mound), and several barrows. There are a number of archaeological trails around Llyn Brenig.

== Ospreys ==
A pair of ospreys began breeding at the lake in 2018, becoming the fifth site in Wales. In 2020 filming of The Bridge, a Channel 4 reality television programme, may have disturbed the ospreys during the breeding season. In April 2021, vandals cut down the osprey nest platform with a chainsaw. The same pair of ospreys returned to Llyn Brenig in 2022 and hatched chicks at a replacement nest in the same location. The Brenig Osprey Project, a partnership between North Wales Wildlife Trust and Dŵr Cymru Welsh Water, provides a viewpoint, a hide, and online video streaming of the nest during the nesting season.
