= 1968 Birthday Honours =

British government recognitions

The 1968 Queen's Birthday Honours were appointments to orders and decorations of the Commonwealth realms to reward and highlight citizens' good works, on the occasion of the official birthday of Queen Elizabeth II. They were announced in supplements to the London Gazette of 31 May 1968.

At this time honours for Australians were awarded both in the United Kingdom honours, on the advice of the premiers of Australian states, and also in a separate Australia honours list.

The recipients of honours are displayed here as they were styled before their new honour, and arranged by honour, with classes (Knight, Knight Grand Cross, etc.) and then divisions (Military, Civil, etc.) as appropriate.

== United Kingdom and Commonwealth ==
=== Life Peer ===
Barons

- Dr. Thomas Balogh, Fellow of Balliol College, Oxford, since 1945, Economic Adviser to the Cabinet Office, 1964–67.
- Sir William Rushton Black, chairman, National Research Development Corporation. Lately Chairman, The Leyland Motor Corporation.
- Sir Geoffrey Crowther, chairman, The Economist Newspaper Ltd., chairman, Trust Houses Group Ltd.
- Professor William David Evans, Professor and Head of the Department of Geology, University of Nottingham.
- John Henry Jacques, JP, chairman, Cooperative Union Ltd.

=== Privy Counsellor ===
- Gerald William Reynolds, MP, Member of Parliament for Islington North since 1958. Parliamentary Under-Secretary of State for Defence for the Army, 1964–65. Minister of Defence for the Army, 1965–1967. Minister of Defence (Administration) since 1967.
- Goronwy Owen Roberts, MP, Member of Parliament for Caernarvonshire, 1945–1950, and for the Caernarvon Division since 1950. Minister of State, Welsh Office, 1964–1966. Minister of State, Department of Education and Science, 1966–1967. Minister of State for Foreign Affairs since 1967.
- John Thomson Stonehouse, MP, Member of Parliament for Wednesbury since 1957. Parliamentary Secretary, Ministry of Aviation, 1964–1966. Parliamentary Under-Secretary of State for the Colonies, 1966–1967. Minister of Aviation, 1967. Minister of State, Ministry of Technology since 1967.

=== Knight Bachelor ===
- Arthur Percival Hay Aitken, deputy chairman, Stone-Platt Industries Ltd. For services to Export.
- Captain George Edward Barnard, Deputy Master, Trinity House.
- Thomas Blackburn, Lately Chairman and Joint Managing Director, Beaverbrook Newspapers Ltd.
- Matthew Busby, CBE, Manager, Manchester United Football Club.
- Professor Herbert Butterfield, Historian.
- Cornelius Cameron, CBE, DL, Alderman, Nottingham City Council.
- William Derrick Capper, Chief Constable, Birmingham City Police.
- John Selby Clements, CBE. For services to Drama.
- Karl Cyril Cohen, CBE, Councillor, Leeds City Council.
- Leonard Drucquer, chairman, Council of Engineering Institutions.
- John Norman Valette Duncan, OBE, chairman and Chief Executive, Rio Tinto Zinc Corporation Ltd. For services to Export.
- Laurence George Gale, CB, OBE, Controller, Royal Ordnance Factories, Ministry of Defence.
- Frederic Evelyn Harmer, CMG, deputy chairman, The Peninsular & Oriental Steam Navigation Company.
- Charles Felix Harris, MD, FRCP. For services to the University of London.
- David Patrick Huddie, managing director, Aero Engine Division, Rolls-Royce Ltd. For services to Export.
- Raymond Winter Jennings, QC, Master of the Court of Protection, Supreme Court of Judicature.
- Henry Cecil Johnson CBE, chairman, British Railways Board.
- William Kirby Laing, JP, chairman, John Laing & Son Ltd.
- Professor Emeritus Max Edgar Lucien Mallowan, CBE. For services to Archaeology.
- William Loris Mather, OBE, MC, TD, DL, chairman, Mather & Platt Ltd. For services to Export.
- Hubert Newton, lately President, International Union of Building Societies and Savings Associations.
- Geoffrey Stephen William Organe, FFARCS, Professor of Anaesthetics, University of London, (Westminster Hospital Medical School).
- Rudolf Ernst Peierls, CBE, Wykeham Professor of Theoretical Physics, University of Oxford.
- Norman George Mollett Prichard, JP, chairman, London Boroughs Association.
- John Renwick, JP, President, The Law Society.
- Kenneth Robson, CBE, MD, FRCP, Registrar, Royal College of Physicians.
- Rupert Leigh Sich, CB, Registrar of Restrictive Trading Agreements.
- Iain Maxwell Stewart, lately chairman, Fairfields (Glasgow) Ltd.
- Allan Grierson Walker, QC, Sheriff of Lanarkshire.
- Barnes Neville Wallis, CBE, Chief of Aeronautical Research and Development, British Aircraft Corporation (Operating) Ltd., Weybridge.

Diplomatic Service and Overseas List

- Cyril Alfred Pitts, United Kingdom citizen, lately resident in India.

State of New South Wales

- John William Goodsell, CMG, chairman, Public Service Board.
- The Honourable Gordon Wallace, President, Court of Appeal, Supreme Court of New South Wales.

State of Victoria

- Councillor Arthur William Nicholson, OBE, JP, Mayor of the City of Ballarat.

State of Queensland

- Arthur Henry Petfield. For services to industrial development and to the community.

State of Western Australia

- Cyril Pangbourne Bird. For services to the community, particularly in the field of Public Accounting.

=== Order of the Bath ===
==== Knight Grand Cross of the Order of the Bath (GCB) ====
Military Division

- General Sir Alan Jolly, KCB, CBE, DSO, (49887), late Royal Armoured Corps. Colonel Commandant, Royal Tank Regiment.

Civil Division

- Sir William Armstrong, KCB, MVO, Joint Permanent Secretary to HM Treasury and Head of the Home Civil Service.

==== Knight Commander of the Order of the Bath (KCB) ====
Military Division

- Vice Admiral Donald Cameron Ernest Forbes Gibson, CB, DSC.
- Lieutenant-General Robert George Victor Fitzgeorge-Balfour, CB, CBE, DSO, MC, (53288), late Foot Guards.
- Lieutenant-General Ian Henry Freeland, CB, DSO, (53691), late Infantry, Deputy Colonel, The Royal Anglian Regiment.
- Acting Air Marshal Andrew Henry Humphrey, CB, OBE, DFC, AFC, Royal Air Force.
- Air Vice-Marshal Lewis MacDonald Hodges, CB, CBE, DSO, DFC, Royal Air Force.

Civil Division

- Basil Charles Engholm, CB, Permanent Secretary, Ministry of Agriculture, Fisheries and Food.
- William Alan Nield, CB, Permanent Under-secretary of State, Department of Economic Affairs.

==== Companion of the Order of the Bath (CB) ====
Military Division

Royal Navy

- Rear Admiral Józef Bartosik, DSC.
- Rear Admiral George Clement Crowley, DSC.
- Rear Admiral George Hammond Evans.
- Rear Admiral William Allen Haynes.
- Rear Admiral John Edward Ludgate Martin, DSC.
- Surgeon Rear Admiral Stanley Miles.
- Rear Admiral William Terence Colborne Ridley, OBE.
- Rear Admiral Denis Bryan Harvey Wildish.

Army

- Major-General John Humphrey Stephen Bowring, OBE, MC, (56617), late Corps of Royal Engineers, Colonel Gurkha Engineers.
- Major-General Peter Edward Moore Bradley, CBE, DSO, (63546), late Royal Corps of Signals, Colonel Commandant, Royal Corps of Signals.
- Major-General Charles Julius Deedes, OBE, MC, (56714), late Infantry, Colonel The King's Own Yorkshire Light Infantry.
- Major-General Raymond Cyril Alexander Edge, MBE, (53654), late Corps of Royal Engineers.
- Major-General Fergus Alan Humphrey Ling, CBE, DSO, (64575), late Infantry.
- Major-General Ian Argyll Robertson, MBE, (62986), late Infantry.
- Major-General Phillip Thomas Tower, DSO, MBE, (71007), late Royal Regiment of Artillery.

Royal Air Force

- Air Vice-Marshal Peter de Lacy Le Cheminant, DFC.
- Air Vice-Marshal Harold Brownlow Martin, DSO, DFC, AFC.
- Air Vice-Marshal George Henry Morley, CBE, QHS, FRCS, LRCP.
- Air Commodore Peter Gerald Desmond Farr, OBE, DFC.
- Air Commodore Idris George Selvin Hemming, CBE, (Retired).
- Air Commodore Stanley Edwin Druce Mills, CBE, (Retired).

Civil Division

- Rowland Lancelot Allen, Principal Assistant Solicitor, Office of HM Procurator General and Treasury Solicitor.
- Richard Douglas Barlas, OBE, Second Clerk Assistant and Clerk of Committees, House of Commons.
- Charles Young Carstairs, CMG. Under-Secretary, Ministry of Public Building and Works.
- Cecil Charles Hall, Director, Warren Spring Laboratory, Ministry of Technology.
- William Francis Spencer Hawkins, JP. Chief Master, Chancery Division of the Supreme Court of Judicature.
- John Joseph Benedict Hunt, First Commissioner, Civil Service Commission.
- Alexander Anthony Jarratt, Deputy Under-Secretary of State, Department of Employment and Productivity.
- John Andrew Jukes, Deputy Under-Secretary of State, Department of Economic Affairs.
- Herbert John Whitfield Lewis, Chief Architect, Ministry of Housing and Local Government.
- John Andrew Oliver, Second Secretary, Ministry of Development for Northern Ireland.
- Robert Macdonald Shaw, MB, Deputy Chief Medical Officer, Ministry of Health.
- Charles Anthony Goodall Simkins, CBE, attached Ministry of Defence.
- Anthony Edward Walter Ward, CBE, Solicitor, Ministry of Social Security. (Died, 21 May 1968).
- James Murray Widdecombe, OBE, Director General of Supplies and Transport (Naval), Ministry of Defence.
- Geoffrey Masterman Wilson, CMG, Deputy Secretary, Ministry of Overseas Development.

=== Order of Saint Michael and Saint George ===
==== Knight Grand Cross of the Order of St Michael and St George (GCMG) ====
Members of the First Class, or Knights Grand Cross, of the said Most Distinguished Order

- Sir Geoffrey Wedgwood Harrison, KCMG, KCVO, Her Majesty's Ambassador Extraordinary and Plenipotentiary, Moscow.
- Sir Patrick Reilly, KCMG, OBE, Her Majesty's Ambassador Extraordinary and Plenipotentiary, Paris.

==== Knight Commander of the Order of St Michael and St George (KCMG) ====
- Robin William John Hooper, CMG, DSO, DFC, Her Majesty's Ambassador Extraordinary and Plenipotentiary, Aden.
- Arthur James de la Mare, CMG, British High Commissioner, Singapore.
- Roderick Francis Gisbert Sarell, CMG, Her Majesty's Ambassador Extraordinary and Plenipotentiary, Tripoli.
- Eric Henry Wyndham White, lately Director-General of the General Agreement on Tariffs and Trade (G.A.T.T.), Geneva.

==== Companion of the Order of St Michael and St George (CMG) ====
- Professor Brian Gilmore Maegraith, MB, KCB, FRCP, Dean, Liverpool School of Tropical Medicine.
- John Duncan Miller, Lately Head of the European Office International Bank for Reconstruction and Development.
- Cicely Delphine Williams, DM, FRCP, For services to paediatrics overseas.

Diplomatic Service and Overseas List

- Colin Hamilton Allan, OBE, British Resident Commissioner, New Hebrides.
- John Ernest Fleetwood Codrington, Permanent Secretary, Ministry of Finance, Bahama Islands.
- Halsey Sparrowe Colchester, OBE, Foreign Office.
- Thomas Anthony Keith Elliott, Political Adviser, Hong Kong.
- Ratu Penaia Kanatabatu Ganilau, DSO, OBE, Minister for Fijian Affairs and Local Government, Fiji.
- Edward Ferguson Given, lately Counsellor, Office of the Political Adviser to the Commander-in-Chief, Far East, Singapore.
- John Dunn Hennings, lately Head of British Office, Salisbury, Rhodesia.
- Kenneth Douglas Jamieson, lately Counsellor (Commercial), Her Majesty's Embassy, Caracas.
- Arthur Terence Lecky, Foreign Office.
- James Livingstone, OBE, Controller, Establishments Division, British Council.
- Jeffrey Charles Petersen, lately Counsellor (Commercial), Her Majesty's Embassy, Athens.
- Henry Sydney Herbert Cloete Stanley, Foreign Office/Commonwealth Office.
- Robert Mathieson Tesh, Counsellor, Her Majesty's Embassy, Cairo.
- John Sutherland Thomson, MBE, Administrator, British Virgin Islands.
- Charles Douglas Wiggin, DFC, AFC, Counsellor, Her Majesty's Embassy, Tehran.
- Edward Youde, MBE, Counsellor and Head of Chancery, United Kingdom Mission to United Nations, New York.

State of New South Wales

- The Honourable Abram Landa, Agent General for New South Wales in London.

State of Victoria

- Leonard Bell Cox, MD, BS, chairman, National Gallery Trustees. For services to the community.

State of Western Australia

- Alfred Charles Curlewis. For services to local government and to the community.

=== Royal Victorian Order ===
==== Knight Grand Cross of the Royal Victorian Order (GCVO) ====
- Air Vice-Marshal Sir Edward Hedley Fielden, KCVO, CB, DFC, AFC.

==== Knight Commander of the Royal Victorian Order (KCVO) ====
- Rear Admiral Christopher Douglas Bonham-Carter, CB, CVO.
- Major-General Cyril Harry Colquhoun, CB, CVO, OBE.
- Colonel the Right Honourable Wykeham Stanley, Baron Cornwallis, KBE, MC.
- Major-General David Dawnay, CB, DSO.
- Major-General Basil Oscar Paul Eugster, CB, CBE, DSO, MC.
- Jack Alexander Sutherland-Harris, CB.
- Major the Honourable Francis Michael Legh, CVO.
- Murray Louis Tyrrell, CVO, CBE, JP.

==== Commander of the Royal Victorian Order (CVO) ====
- Peter Dimmock, OBE.
- Commander John Lawlor, Metropolitan Police.
- James Bernard Vivian Orr, MVO.

==== Member of the Royal Victorian Order (MVO) ====
At this time the two lowest classes of the Royal Victorian Order were "Member (fourth class)" and "Member (fifth class)", both with post-nominal letters MVO. "Member (fourth class)" was renamed "Lieutenant" (LVO) from the 1985 New Year Honours onwards.

Fourth Class

- Lieutenant Commander Peter Richard Buckley, Royal Navy.
- Gerald Cobb.
- Geoffrey de Bellaigue.
- Commander John Patrick Fisher, Royal Navy.
- Anne Alicia Hamersley, MVO.
- William John Dennis Irving.
- Captain Peter Hugh Norman, 9th/12th Royal Lancers.
- Ronald Henry Phipps.
- Briant Alfred Poulter.

Fifth Class

- Joseph Mackrey Fisher.
- Sidney Willis.
- Sarah Jane Wood.
- Rupert More Wood.

==== Medal of the Royal Victorian Order (RVM) ====
In Silver

- Divisional Sergeant-Major Joseph Frederick Adkins, Her Majesty's Bodyguard of the Yeomen of the Guard.
- Jack Arthur Brewer.
- Chief Engine Room Artificer Bernard Joseph Clear, P/MX 708056.
- Albert Victor Augustus Doel.
- John Elcock.
- Arthur Henry Elkins.
- Olive Jones.
- Alfred Ernest Long.
- George Mackay.
- 294789 Corporal of Horse Gilbert Edward Mellor, The Life Guards.
- Medical Technician First Class Thomas John Richards, P/MX 840813.
- Leonard Horace Riches.
- James Edward Walton.

=== Order of the British Empire ===
==== Knight Grand Cross of the Order of the British Empire (GBE) ====
Military Division

- Admiral Sir Nigel Henderson, KCB, OBE.

Civil Division

- Sir Gilbert Samuel Inglefield, TD, Lord Mayor of London.

==== Dame Commander of the Order of the British Empire (DBE) ====
Civil Division

- Isabel Graham Bryce, chairman, Oxford Regional Hospital Board, and for services to social and personnel administration.
- Kathleen Annie Raven (Mrs. John Thornton Ingram), Chief Nursing Officer, Ministry of Health.
- Muriel Arcadia Stewart. For services to Education.
- Cicely Veronica Wedgwood, CBE, Historian.
- Ethel May Wormald, JP. Lately Lord Mayor of Liverpool.

==== Knight Commander of the Order of the British Empire (KBE) ====
Military Division

- Vice Admiral Patrick Uniacke Bayly, CB, DSC**, CBE.
- Major-General Wilfrid John Potter, CB, CBE, (56724), late Royal Army Service Corps, Colonel Commandant, Royal Corps of Transport and Royal Army Ordnance Corps.
- Air Marshal Thomas William Piper, CB, CBE, AFC, Royal Air Force.

Civil Division

- John James Cowperthwaite, CMG, OBE, Financial Secretary, Hong Kong.

State of Victoria

- The Honourable Arthur Gordon Rylah, CMG, ED, Deputy Premier and Chief Secretary.

==== Commander of the Order of the British Empire (CBE) ====
Military Division

Royal Navy

- Captain George Clifton Baldwin.
- Senior Chief Engineer Officer Henry Charles Adams Brain, Royal Fleet Auxiliary.
- Captain Edward William Ellis.
- Mary Stella Fetherston-Dilke, Queen Alexandra's Royal Naval Nursing Service.
- Colonel Thomas Cecil Hay Macafee.
- Captain Ernest John Donaldson Turner, DSO, DSC.

Army

- Brigadier John Monkton Armstead Braddell (39144), Royal Army Pay Corps (now retired).
- Colonel Lucy Myfanwy Davies, OBE, (223106), late Women's Royal Army Corps, now, R.A.R.O.
- Brigadier Angus Digby Hastings Irwin, DSO, MC, (73151), late Infantry, formerly Commander British Joint Services Team, Ghana (now R.A.R.O.).
- Colonel Richard Mervyn St. George Kirke, OBE, (77540), late Royal Regiment of Artillery.
- Colonel (acting) Robert Dalrymple Maclagan, MC, (58193), Army Cadet Force.
- Colonel Alistair James Strang Martin, OBE, (74694), late Infantry.
- Brigadier Peter Lawrence de Carteret Martin, OBE, (95604), late Infantry.
- Brigadier Ronald George Miller (62546), late Royal Corps of Signals.
- Brigadier John Humphrey Montagu, OBE, (378128), late Infantry.
- Brigadier John Cassels Monteith, MC, (65386), late Infantry.
- Brigadier Jock Arthur Hume Moore, OBE, (68937), late Corps of Royal Electrical and Mechanical Engineers, now R.A.R.O.
- Brigadier David Turner Morrison (323691), late Royal Army Ordnance Corps.
- Right Reverend Monsignor John Jeremiah Joseph O'Mahoney (100703), Royal Army Chaplains' Department.

Royal Air Force

- Air Commodore Frank Leslie Dodd, DSO, DFC, AFC.
- Acting Air Commodore Eric Donald Hills, MBE.
- Group Captain Charles Francis Ambrose, DFC, AFC.
- Group Captain Frederick Oliver Barrett, DFC.
- Group Captain Nelson Briggs, AFC.
- Group Captain Ronald Leonard Stanley Coulson.
- Group Captain Sinclair Melville Davidson.
- Group Captain Harry Aubrey Fletcher Summers, MBE.
- Group Captain Arthur Peter Vicary, MBE.

Civil Division

- Henry Stuart Andrew, Lately Associate Director, Department of Highways and Transportation, Greater London Council.
- Stephen Walter Arlen, managing director, Sadler's Wells Theatre.
- Gordon Meyler Baker, President, Engineering Employers' Federation.
- Robert Hugh Barkshire, Secretary, Committee of London Clearing Bankers and British Bankers' Association.
- Cedric Minett Benham, chairman, Painton & Company Ltd. For services to Export.
- James Bennett, managing director, A. Reyrolle & Company Ltd. For services to Export.
- Raymond John Heaphy Beverton, Secretary, Natural Environment Research Council.
- Leslie Thompson Blakeman, Director of Labour Relations, Ford Motor Company Ltd.
- George Simms Bosworth. For services to the industrial training of professional engineers.
- Edward Hugh Bott, Assistant Secretary, Ministry of Agriculture, Fisheries and Food.
- John Brass, Divisional Chairman, Yorkshire, Lancashire, North Wales and Cumberland coalfields, National Coal Board.
- Frank Vaughan Brook, chairman and Joint Managing Director, Brook Motors Ltd., Huddersfield. For services to Export.
- Leslie Cannon, General President, Electrical Trades Union.
- David Alexander Carter, chairman, Hertfordshire Agricultural Executive Committee.
- Arthur Thomas Cheek, Deputy Inspector General of Companies, Companies Liquidation and Bankruptcy, Board of Trade.
- Archibald Leman Cochrane, MBE, FRCP, David Davies Professor of Tuberculosis and Diseases of the Chest, Welsh National School of Medicine.
- Ralph Cocker, FDS, RCS, Professor of Dental Surgery, King's College Hospital Medical School.
- Ernest Rosie Corrigall, MRCVS, Regional Veterinary Officer, West Midland Region, Ministry of Agriculture, Fisheries and Food. For services during the recent Foot-and-Mouth disease epidemic.
- William Henderson Coulthard, Chief Scientific Officer, Royal Armament Research and Development Establishment, Ministry of Defence.
- John Stafford Cripps, Chairman of the council, Rural District Councils Association.
- Alphonso Liguori d'Abreu, OBE, FRCS, Professor of Surgery, Medical School, University of Birmingham.
- Herman Francis David, chairman, All England Lawn Tennis and Croquet Club.
- Stuart Duncan Davies, Technical Director, Dowty-Rotol Ltd.
- Una Joseph Dillon. For services to the Book Trade.
- Helen Murray Downton, Matron, University College Hospital, London.
- David Philip Evans, Principal, Glamorgan College of Technology.
- Leonard Miller Fairclough, JP, President, Leonard Fairclough Ltd.
- William Alexander Fawcett, Headmaster, Kennington County Secondary Boys' School, London.
- Thomas William Hamilton Gailey, chairman, Tilling Association Ltd.
- Henry Claude Lyon Garnett, chairman, Gillette Industries Ltd. For services to Export.
- Thomas Robert Grieve, MC, Vice Chairman and managing director, ShellMex & B.P. Ltd.
- Stanley Paterson Grounds, Charity Commissioner.
- William Rowan Hare, JP. For services to the food industry.
- Alan James Harris, Civil Engineering Consultant.
- Geoffrey Thomas Harris, managing director, Jessop-Saville Ltd.
- Cyril Hebblethwaite, JP, Alderman, Bristol County Borough.
- Iain Robertson Hilleary, JP, Member, Inverness-shire County Council. For public and social services in the Highlands.
- Roger Hilton, Artist.
- Arthur Hugh Montgomery Irwin, Assistant Secretary, Ministry of Transport.
- Elsie Sybil, Lady Janner, JP, President, Brady Clubs and Settlement.
- Leslie William Lane, Director, The Civic Trust.
- Captain Donald Basil Lattin, Chief Marine Superintendent, British India Steam Navigation Company Ltd.
- John Dennis Lennon, MC, Architect and Designer.
- Jan Alfred Lewando, Export Director, Marks & Spencer Ltd. For services to Export.
- John Herriot Lockie, chairman, Scottish Council for Commercial, Administrative and Professional Education.
- Lieutenant-Colonel Arthur Heywood-Lonsdale, MC, DL, chairman, Salop County Council.
- Mary Agnes McAlister, JP, lately deputy chairman, Supplementary Benefits Commission and for services to health and welfare in Scotland.
- Professor Farquhar MacRitchie. For services in the field of Scots law.
- Peter John Mapplebeck, Director of Contracts, General Post Office.
- Stewart Carlton Mason. For services to the Arts.
- Arthur Neville Moon, DL, Clerk of the County Council and Clerk of the Peace, Hertfordshire.
- Alan McCrae Moorehead, OBE, Journalist and Author.
- Jack Hollingworth Napper, Professor of Architecture, University of Newcastle upon Tyne.
- Frank Nixon, Company Quality and Reliability Engineer, Rolls-Royce Ltd., Derby.
- Douglas Osmond, OBE, Chief Constable, Hampshire Constabulary.
- Gerald Basil Coote Palmer, Headmaster, Mark Hall Comprehensive School, Harlow.
- Joseph Anthony Peacocke, OBE, Deputy Inspector General, Royal Ulster Constabulary.
- Thomas Robert Percy, OBE, chairman, Visiting Committee, HM Prison, Durham.
- Geoffrey Anderson Phalp, TD, Secretary and Principal Administrative Officer, United Birmingham Hospitals.
- The Honourable Penelope Katherine Piercy, Under Secretary, Ministry of Technology.
- Charlie Dennis Pilcher. For services to Housing and New Towns.
- Arthur Pollard, HM Inspector of Schools, Department of Education and Science.
- Charles James Ratchford, JP, Councillor, Camden Borough Council.
- Professor David Talbot Rice, MBE, TD. For services to the Arts.
- Geoffrey Christian Richardson, Secretary, Metropolitan Police.
- Leslie Llewellyn Roberts, chairman and managing director, Raleigh Industries Ltd. For services to Export.
- Douglas Fraser Ruston, Lately Director, Cotton Research Corporation.
- George Ian Scott, FRCS, (Ed.), FRCP(Ed.), Professor of Ophthalmology, University of Edinburgh.
- William Donald Scott. Lately Chairman, Home Grown Cereals Authority.
- Professor Humphrey Searle, Composer.
- Claude Frederick Shoolbred, Lately Clerk of the Peace, Middlesex Area Quarter Sessions.
- Elkan Simons, Joint Managing Director, Simons Bros. (London) Ltd. For services to Export.
- John Derg Sutherland, FRCP(Ed.), medical director, Tavistock Clinic.
- William Bertram Swan, TD, JP, DL, President, Scottish Agricultural Organisation Society.
- Francis Foster Taylor, OBE, Secretary, Country Landowners' Association.
- Wilfred Patrick Thesiger, DSO, Author.
- Harold Hubert Tilley, Headmaster, Caludon Castle Comprehensive School, Coventry.
- William Arthur Treganowan, Assistant Secretary, Department of Employment and Productivity.
- Ronald Charles Tress. Lately Chairman, South West Economic Planning Council.
- Mary Trevelyan, OBE, Governor (formerly Director), International Students' House, London.
- Frederick Charles Tughan, Member and chairman, Seed Potato Marketing Board for Northern Ireland.
- Commander Henry Pasley-Tyler, Royal Navy (Retired), Director, Elliott-Automation Ltd. For services to Export.
- Professor Ralph Louis Wain, Honorary Director, Unit on Plant Growth Substances and Systematic Fungicides, Agricultural Research Council, Wye, Kent.
- John Christian Godfrey Wegerif, managing director, Bentley Engineering Group Ltd., Leicester. For services to Export.
- Harold Alexander Whitson, chairman, Melville Dundas & Whitson, Ltd., Glasgow.
- Christopher David Wilson, MC, managing director, Southern Television Ltd.
- David John Young, Lately Assistant Managing Director, South Wales Group, British Steel Corporation.

Diplomatic Service And Overseas List

- James Thomas Atherstone Bailey, OBE, Commissioner of Police, Botswana.
- Dermont Campbell Barty, OBE, lately Commissioner for Resettlement, Hong Kong.
- William Paterson Doyle, lately Judge of the Supreme Court of Libya.
- Harold Arthur Gent, British subject resident in Italy.
- Michael Herbert Frank Holden, Judge, High Court of Justice,. Northern States of Nigeria.
- Cenydd Richards Jones, OBE, MB, BCh, lately Permanent Secretary and Director of Health Services, Ministry of Health, Federation of South Arabia.
- Victor Clement Josse, MBE, chairman, Public Service Commission and Police Service Commission, Saint Christopher-Nevis-Anguilla.
- William Jessom Joyce, United Kingdom citizen resident in Nigeria.
- Ian Alexander McGregor, OBE, FRCP, Director, Medical Research Council, Fajara, The Gambia.
- John MacIsaac MacNeill, British subject resident in the People's Republic of Southern Yemen.
- Alfred Musgrave Merriweather, OBE, MD, lately Speaker, Botswana National Assembly.
- Basil Raymond Miles, lately Puisne Judge, Kenya.
- Arthur John Montague, OBE, lately British Council Representative, Canada.
- The Right Reverend Stanley Chapman Pickard, lately Anglican Bishop of Lebombo, Portuguese East Africa.
- George Oswald Ratteray, lately Member of Executive Council, Bermuda.
- Hugh McBrea Roemmele, Secretary to the Cabinet and Head of the Civil Service, Swaziland.
- The Right Reverend Reginald Richard Roseveare, lately Anglican Bishop of Accra, Ghana.
- Alastair Wallace Sandford, British subject resident in Italy.
- Alexander Robertson Sinclair, lately Deputy General Manager (Finance), National Electricity Board, States of Malaya.
- Harry Start, British subject resident in France.
- Willoughby Harry Thompson, MBE, Colonial Secretary, Falkland Islands.
- Murry Pearce White, British subject resident in the United States.
- Gordon Henry Wilson, United Kingdom citizen resident in Nigeria.

State of New South Wales

- Adrian Mackey Johnson, MB, BS, Senior Dermatologist, Royal Prince Alfred Hospital. For services to medicine.
- Matthew John O'Neill. For services to the community.

State of Victoria

- Frederick Falkiner Knight, of Toorak. For services to the community.
- Langford Horace Waite. For services to the community.

State of Queensland

- Leslie Charles Thiess. For services in the fields of Civil Engineering and Mining.

State of South Australia

- John Schomburgk Walker, Director-General of Education.

State of Western Australia

- Noel George Humphries. For services to industry and to the community.

State of Tasmania.

- Peter Braithwaite, ED, MB, BS, chairman, Tasmanian Division of the Australian Red Cross Society. For services to medicine.

==== Officer of the Order of the British Empire (OBE) ====
Military Division

Royal Navy

- Commander Lionel Harold Butler, VRD, Royal Naval Reserve.
- Lieutenant Commander Malcolm Bowers Cragg.
- Acting Commander Montague Brian Edwards.
- The Reverend Kenneth Percy Evans.
- Lieutenant Commander John Grattan.
- Commander Edward Murray Halley.
- Commander Michael Alaric Josselyn Morton Hayward.
- Commander Gordon Eric Jessey.
- Commander William Gordon Lockyer.
- Lieutenant Colonel Patrick John Ovens, MC, Royal Marines.
- Commander Frank Lancaster Rawles.
- Surgeon Commander James Simpson Ritchie.
- Lieutenant Commander Graham John Arthur Shaw.
- Commander Frank Guy Travers.

Army

- Lieutenant-Colonel Keith Andrew (363189), Royal Corps of Transport.
- Lieutenant-Colonel John Abraham Bailie (155188), Royal Regiment of Artillery, Territorial and Army Volunteer Reserve.
- Colonel (acting) Henry Joseph Patrick Baxter, GM, (363915), Royal Irish Fusiliers.
- Lieutenant-Colonel Robert Evelyn Brook-Fox, MC, (77516), Royal Regiment of Artillery.
- Lieutenant-Colonel (Director of Music) Basil Hector Brown, MBE, (388004), Corps of Royal Engineers.
- Lieutenant-Colonel Ivonl Ralph Courtney (105896), Royal Regiment of Artillery.
- Lieutenant-Colonel (acting) Sidney Hayes Curtis (307849), Combined Cadet Force.
- Lieutenant-Colonel Leslie Phillips Graham Dow (357197), The Kings Own Scottish Borderers, The Cameronians (Scottish Rifles).
- Lieutenant-Colonel James Lawrence Evans, MBE, TD, (304612), Corps of Royal Engineers, Territorial and Army Volunteer Reserve.
- Lieutenant-Colonel Robert John Gibson, TD, (227359), Corps of Royal Electrical and Mechanical Engineers, Territorial and Army Volunteer Reserve.
- Lieutenant-Colonel (acting) John Hamilton Greenwood, TD, (265429), Combined Cadet Force.
- Lieutenant-Colonel Arthur Alfred William Hall (188195), Corps of Royal Electrical and Mechanical Engineers.
- Lieutenant-Colonel Peter Richard Heaton-Ellis (288552), Royal Regiment of Artillery.
- Lieutenant-Colonel Donald Edward Isles (304096), The Duke of Wellington's Regiment (West Riding).
- Lieutenant-Colonel (Director of Music), Cecil Harry Jaeger (392104), Irish Guards.
- Lieutenant-Colonel (Quartermaster) George Arnold Kirk (386800), Army Catering Corps.
- Lieutenant-Colonel Richard George Lawson, DSO, (393195), Royal Tank Regiment.
- Lieutenant-Colonel Ronald William Lorne McAlister, MBE, (336416), 10th Princess Mary's Own Gurkha Rifles.
- Lieutenant-Colonel Gilfrid James Maughan (300340), The Durham Light Infantry.
- Lieutenant-Colonel Francis Graham Neville, MC, TD, (267202), The Queen's Regiment, Territorial and Army Volunteer Reserve, now R.A.R.O.
- Lieutenant-Colonel Alan Geoffrey Norman, TD, (281977), The Sherwood Foresters (Nottinghamshire and Derbyshire Regiment), Territorial and Army Volunteer Reserve.
- Lieutenant-Colonel Denis Oswald O'Leary, MBE, MC, (380903), 7th Duke of Edinburgh's Own Gurkha Rifles.
- Lieutenant-Colonel John Mark Herbert Roberts (327485), The Parachute Regiment.
- Lieutenant-Colonel Walter Peter Walker Robertson (278721), Royal Corps of Signals.
- Lieutenant-Colonel Robert Claude Thorpe (420468), Royal Corps of Transport.
- Lieutenant-Colonel (Quartermaster) John Holman Walters, MBE, (266339), Royal Corps of Transport.
- Lieutenant-Colonel (acting) William Wheeler, MBE, (332027), Army Cadet Force.

Royal Air Force

- Wing Commander John Lindsay Miller Corbet, MB, BS, (503077).
- Wing Commander John Reginald Every (126918).
- Wing Commander Terence Michael Fennell, AFC, (576575).
- Wing Commander (Acting Group Captain) Harry Gill (150063).
- Wing Commander Douglas Frank Gilson, DFC, (034282), Royal Australian Air Force.
- Wing Commander Donald John Harper, AFC, (188610).
- Wing Commander Harold Robert Kerr, MBE, (136728), Royal Auxiliary Air Force.
- Wing Commander Colin King, MBE, (570793).
- Wing Commander Leonard Charles Maynard (172133).
- Wing Commander Roy Morris (159201).
- Wing Commander Lawrence Theodore Osborne (166791).
- Wing Commander Douglas George Farley Palmer (57630).
- Wing Commander Ralph Deryk Roberts (49435).
- Wing Commander Michael John Eldon Swiney (58151).
- Wing Commander Peter Alan Scott Thompson, DFC, (110891).
- Wing Commander Peter Robert Wilkinson (51418).
- Acting Wing Commander Henry Charles Frederick Squire (199409), Royal Air Force Volunteer Reserve (Training Branch).

Civil Division

- Jeffery Stanford Agate, Works General Manager, Du Pont Company (U.K.) Ltd., Maydown, County Londonderry.
- Leslie Marcus Allen, Grade 4 Officer, Diplomatic Service.
- Dorothy Paton Verden Anderson, JP. For services to child care in Scotland.
- James Arrol, County Surveyor, Ross and Cromarty County Council.
- Frank Austin, JP, chairman and Managing Diiector, F. Austin (Leyton) Ltd.
- Colonel the Honourable David Andrew Balfour, TD, DL, chairman, British Legion, Scotland.
- Harry Bann, Town Clerk, County Borough of Huddersfield.
- Donald Angus Philip Barry, Lately Chairman, Polmont Borstal Visiting Committee.
- Joseph Smith Baty, Lately Chief Engineer, Internal Combustion Engine Department, Vickers Ltd. (Shipbuilding Group), Barrow-in-Furness.
- Commander Arthur Walter Beeton, Royal Navy (Retired), North Regional Chairman, Air Training Corps and Member of Air Cadet Council.
- Walter Gordon Benoy, Architect. For services to farm building.
- Mary Whillance Besford, Headmistress, Hillside County Secondary School for Girls, Leeds.
- Stanley Narcissus Bigwood, Alderman, Salisbury City Council.
- Basil Martin Bird, chief executive officer, Board of Trade.
- Grenville Raymond Hugh Bishop, Principal Scientific Officer, Animal Breeding Research Organisation, Edinburgh.
- David Graham Bisset, chairman, Enfield Foundry Company Ltd., Waltham Cross.
- Winifred Blackburn, Deputy Headmistress Ducie High School, Manchester.
- Albert Oscar Bluth, chairman, Barber-Greene Olding & Company Ltd. For services to Export.
- Leonard John Boulter, Principal Inspector, Board of Customs and Excise.
- John Basil Brennan, MBE, General Secretary, Institution of Chemical Engineers.
- George Edward Bromley, formerly Deputy Chief Quantity Surveyor, Ministry of Housing and Local Government.
- Jack Leslie Brooker, Chief Communications Officer, Home Office.
- George Herbert Brown, Senior Legal Assistant, Board of Inland Revenue.
- John McLachlan Brown, Senior Chief Executive Officer, Ministry of Defence.
- Herbert Baillie Bruce, Manager, Glasgow and Clyde Area, South of Scotland Electricity Board.
- Kate Wishart Duthie Bruce, Senior Matron, Royal Edinburgh Hospital.
- Beryl Burton, MBE. For services to Cycling.
- Michael Oswell Bury, Director, Iron and Steel Industry Training Board.
- Brigadier Lorne MacLaine Campbell, VC, DSO, TD. For services to Government Hospitality.
- Ronald Hugh Campbell, Deputy Chief Engineer, Reactor Group, Risley, United Kingdom Atomic Energy Authority.
- Alderman Leonard Chaffey, chairman, Upper Tame Main Drainage Authority.
- William John Charlton, Director, North Yorkshire Area, National Coal Board.
- Leonard Oliver Clarke, Chief Fire Officer, Swansea Fire Brigade.
- Frederick James Clay, Deputy Assistant Paymaster General and Establishment Officer, Paymaster General's Office.
- Kathleen Mary Cocks, Lately Nursing Officer, Sheffield Regional Hospital Board.
- John Constable, Regional Engineer, Birmingham Regional Hospital Board.
- Major Denis Joseph Cowen, JP, DL, deputy chairman, Leicester County Agricultural Executive Committee.
- Francis George Heddell Cowie, Financial Secretary, Legal Aid Central Committee, Law Society of Scotland.
- Norman William Dacey. Lately Command Supervisor, Navy, Army, and Air Force Institutes, Aden.
- John George Dagg, Chief Engineer, Stonepool, Sir R. Ropner (Management) Ltd.
- Douglas McPherson Dales, chief executive officer, Ministry of Defence.
- Berwyn Owen Davies, managing director, A. E. Davies & Sons (Builders) Ltd., Wrexham.
- Frederick Davies, assistant director (Marketing and Promotion), Overseas Directorate, Confederation of British Industry. For services to Export.
- Rhys Davies, Author.
- Richard Davis, Director of Finance, The Gas Council.
- Rupert Godfrey de Ferembre, chairman, The Royal Borough of Kensington and Chelsea Savings Committee.
- Robert Donovan Alec de la Mare, chairman, Oxford Trustee Savings Bank.
- John Dent. Lately Director and Chief Engineer, Hawker Siddeley Dynamics, Whitley, Coventry.
- Frank Dolan Donnelly, JP. For services to the community in Belfast.
- Edward Donovan, Headmaster, Lingfield Hospital School for Epileptic Children.
- Elizabeth Jane Donovon, Temporary Statistician, Cabinet Office.
- Walter William Jack Etheridge, chairman, Hillingdon Borough Savings Committee.
- Gwendolen Calan Evans, JP. Alderman Cardigan County Council and Member of Education Committee.
- Howell Justin Evans, MBE. Lately Acting General Secretary, Central Council of Physical Recreation.
- Cyril George Faulkner, Alderman, Northamptonshire County Council. Councillor, Rushden Urban District Council.
- James Bernard Flanagan, MBE, County Inspector, Royal Ulster Constabulary.
- Wilfred Francis Francis, MBE, BEM, chairman, Brecon, Radnor and West Glamorgan War Pensions Committee.
- William Osselton Galbraith, Head of Appointments Department, British Broadcasting Corporation.
- Margaret Alice Gibbs, Deputy Principal, Southlands College of Education, Wimbledon.
- Thomas Gibson Gillespy. Lately Deputy Director, Fruit and Vegetable Preservation Research Association, Chipping Campden, Gloucestershire.
- Patrick Arundell Gillibrand, Regional General Manager, Germany, British European Airways.
- William Gillies, HM Inspector of Schools (Higher Grade), Scottish Education Department.
- Leslie James Godden, LDS, RCS, FDS, RCS (Ed.). Lately Editor, British Dental Journal.
- John Alfred Godfrey, Finance Secretary and Deputy Director General, Royal National Institute for the Blind.
- Herbert Goodier, MBE, Secretary, Apparel and Fashion Industry's Association.
- Sydney Gordon, JP. For services to local government in Huyton.
- William Grant, MRCVS, Deputy Regional Veterinary Officer, West Scotland Region, Ministry of Agriculture, Fisheries and Food. For services during the recent Foot-and-Mouth disease epidemic.
- David Gray, Secretary, The Industrial Society.
- Charles Cockburn Greig, chairman, Hull and District Local Savings Committee.
- Ruth Florence Griffiths, Director, Child Development Research Centre.
- Basil Joseph Gurney, chief executive officer, Ministry of Transport.
- Edward Haines, Town Clerk and Clerk of the Peace, County Borough of Oldham.
- Harry Rushton Hampson, Head Postmaster, Cambridge.
- Agnes Muriel Harding, Headmistress, Heol Hir Girls High School, Cardiff.
- Bernard Hargrove, Senior Lecturer in the Faculty of Laws, University College, London.
- Samuel Harvey, MB, ChB, MRCP, Medical Officer of Health for Dunbartonshire.
- Francis Oswald Hayes, Borough Architect and Planner, Southwark.
- Arthur Williamson Helliwell, Feature Writer, The People.
- John Charles Henly, Chief Fuel Engineer, Ministry of Power.
- Allen Sainsbury Hicks. For services to Education.
- Graham Hill. For services to Motor Racing.
- Kathleen May Hill, MBE, Assistant Inspector of Constabulary.
- Alderman Thomas Holmes, chairman, Durham (National Health Service) Executive Council.
- John Holt, Regional Architect, South-Eastern Regional Hospital Board, Scotland.
- Arthur Hudson, Senior Chief Engineer, Darina, Shell Tankers (U.K.) Ltd.
- John Henry Hynes, Senior Works Manager, St. Stephen's Parliamentary Press, HM Stationery Office.
- James George Iles, Town Clerk, Newport, Monmouthshire.
- James Alexander Imrie, FRCS(Ed.), FRCPS, Chief Medical Officer, City of Glasgow Police.
- James Johnston, Senior Chief Executive Officer, Ministry of Social Security.
- Charles Morris Jones, MBE, JP, Alderman, Merioneth County Council.
- Captain Daniel Wynn Jones, Principal Officer, South and South West of England Marine Survey District, Board of Trade.
- David Morgan Jones, Superintending Architect, Ministry of Public Building and Works.
- William Maldwyn Jones, chairman, Leeds (Group B) Hospital Management Committee.
- Henry Oscar Joseph, Chairman of the council, Central British Fund for Jewish Relief and Rehabilitation.
- John Kane, Councillor, Edinburgh Town Council.
- Stewart Filshill Kennedy, chairman and managing director, Church & Company Ltd. For services to Export.
- William Henry Kerr, President, Milford Haven Trawler Owners' Association Ltd.
- Gordon Geoffrey Kesby, MBE, Senior Chief Executive Officer, Ministry of Overseas Development.
- Alderman Doreen Ethel King, chairman, Health Committee, Wiltshire County Council.
- Graeme Edwin King, Chief Project Engineer, British Aircraft Corporation (Operating) Ltd., Stevenage.
- Roy Alexander Kraty, assistant director, Ministry of Defence.
- Henry Justus Kroch, managing director, A.B. Electronic Components Ltd., Abercynon, Glamorgan. For services to Export.
- James Laurie, FRCS(Ed), FRCPS, Consultant Physician, Dumfries and Galloway Hospital Group.
- John Leiper, Member, South Western Agricultural Executive Committee, Scotland.
- Jonathan Tudor Stafford Lewis. For services to overseas students.
- Peter Renell Lisle, Chief Engineer, British Waterways Board.
- Alice Katharine Lloyd, JP, Member, Central Training Council in Child Care.
- Joan Mary Loveridge. Lately Matron, St. Bartholomew's Hospital, London.
- Joseph Hinchchff McCloy. Lately Chairman, West Riding of Yorkshire Agricultural Executive Committee.
- Iona Mary McFerran. For social services in Northern Ireland.
- John Robert McLoughlin, JP, District Secretary (Liverpool, North Wales and Irish District), National Union of General and Municipal Workers.
- James Borthwick Macnab, Headmaster, Roman Hill Secondary Boys' School, Lowestoft.
- Thomas Henry Malia, Alderman, Northumberland County Council.
- Thomas Denzil Matkin, MBE, National Secretary, Retail Fruit Trade Federation Ltd.
- Reuben Darrell Agresti Maurice, Head of Research Department, British Broadcasting Corporation.
- Robert May, chairman, Crawley and District Employment Committee.
- Captain Nicol Stanley Milne, Master, Ceramic, Shaw Savill and Albion Company Ltd.
- Patrick Alfred Moore. For services to astronomy.
- Ursula Moreton (Dorothy Ursula Stevens), Principal, Royal Ballet School.
- Stephen William Kenneth Morgan, managing director, Imperial Smelting Processes Ltd. For services to Export.
- Barbara Grace Morton, MB, BS, Medical Superintendent, Bermondsey Medical Mission.
- Alan David Nunes Nabarro. For services to youth in London.
- Ranald Edward Newell, Member, Nuclear Safety Advisory Committee.
- Jane Mervyn Newnham. For services to the Girl Guide Association.
- Archie Niman, chief executive officer, Ministry of Technology.
- Elizabeth Mary O'Connell, Lately Deputy Headmistress, Bishop Challoner Secondary Girls School, London E.1.
- John William Odell, Joint Managing Director, Lesney Products & Company Ltd. For services to Export.
- Rhys John Oliver, MRCS, LRCP. For services to the Prison Medical Service, HM Prison, Bedford.
- Ada Violet Victoria Parkes, MB, ChB, JP, General Medical Practitioner, Warwickshire.
- John Alexander Pasfield, MRCVS, Veterinary Surgeon. For services during the recent Foot-and-Mouth disease epidemic.
- William Harvey Pearce, Principal Probation Officer, Durham Probation Area.
- Dilys Mary Phillips, Dairy Husbandry Adviser Grade I, Ministry of Agriculture, Fisheries and Food. For services during the recent Foot-and-Mouth disease epidemic.
- Stanley Thomas Pickering, managing director, Pilkington Brothers Ltd., St. Asaph, Flintshire. For services to Export.
- Frank Felix Pollock, Chief Officer, Exeter, Division, Civil Defence Corps.
- Robert Faulds Pollock, Town Clerk, Rutherglen.
- Frederick James Potter, Lately General Secretary, Dr. Barnardo's Homes.
- Beryl Ena Rabley, HM Inspector of Schools, Department of Education and Science.
- Archibald Kilmorack Rankin, MB, ChB, lately General Medical Practitioner and lately chairman, Cumberland (National Health Service) Executive Council.
- Lucie Rie, Artist-potter.
- John Maitland Robertson, Deputy Secretary, British Association for the Advancement of Science.
- Leonard Arthur Robinson. For services to the Scout Movement and especially to handicapped boys.
- Herbert Clifford Rogers, DFC, Chief Test Pilot, Rolls-Royce Ltd.
- Alfred Rose, MBE, JP, lately Chairman of Advisory Committee on Justices of the Peace for Southampton.
- Sidney Thomas Arthur Rosindell, lately Industrial Correspondent, Press Association.
- Benjamin Philip Rowntree, chairman, York Local Advisory Committee, Ministry of Social Security.
- Bertie Edwin Roycraft, JP, Alderman, London Borough of Barking.
- Margaret Winifred Rushforth, MB, ChB, lately Honorary Medical Director, Davidson Clinic, Edinburgh.
- Archibald Cochrane Rutherford, TD, chairman, South East Scotland War Pensions Committee.
- Henry John Sampson Ryman, JP, lately Member, Chorleywood Urban District Council. Alderman, Hertfordshire County Council.
- Norman David Bridger Sage, Treasurer, Bullingdon Rural District Council.
- Francis Douglas Sanders, managing director, Book Centre Ltd. For services to Export.
- Captain Gabriel Christopher Sankey, lately Honorary Show Director, Royal International Dairy Show.
- Wing Commander William Harold Nelson Shakespeare, MC, AFC, deputy chairman, Royal Air Forces Association.
- Joseph Sluglett, MD, General Medical Practitioner, Bristol.
- Charles Leslie Miller Smith, chairman, Gloucester Local Employment Committee.
- Leslie Charles Smith, Joint Managing Director, Lesney Products & Company Ltd. For services to Export.
- Roland Sidney Smith, Head of Contracts Services Department, Crown Agents for Oversea Governments and Administrations.
- Olive Spooner, Grade 2 Officer, Department of Employment and Productivity.
- Evelyn Mary Stewart, Vice-chairman, Chartered Society of Physiotherapy.
- Arthur Leslie Stuchbery, Technical Director, Metal Box Company Ltd.
- Francis Dean Swift, Director, Wolseley-Hughes Group Services Ltd.
- James Craven-Sykes, President, National Egg Packers' Association Ltd.
- Andrew Wilson Tait, Director, National House Builders Registration Council.
- Frederick George Tarrant, assistant director, Guided Weapons (Engineering), Ministry of Technology.
- Denis Graham William Tayler, DFC, Chief Test Pilot, Short Brothers & Harland Ltd., Belfast.
- Alexander Watt Taylor, chairman, North Eastern Agricultural Executive Committee, Scotland.
- Arthur John Ernest Taylor, Town Clerk, Bootle County Borough.
- Edwin Leslie Taylor. For services to the British Travel Association.
- Percy George Tipple, Lately Chairman, Winsford Urban District Council.
- Roy George James Tovey, LDS, RCS, General Dental Practitioner, Essex.
- Reginald Roy Tyrrell, lately Principal Officer, Ministry of Home Affairs for Northern Ireland.
- Roderick Mackenzie Urquhart, Secretary and Registrar, University of Southampton.
- William Gervase Vizard, Lately Chairman of the Swindon National Insurance Tribunal.
- Commander Richard Walker, RD, Royal Naval Reserve, Haven Master, Port of Bristol Authority.
- Ivor William Ward, executive director, A.T.V. Network Ltd.
- John Paley Ward, Technical Adviser, Board of Inland Revenue.
- George Ian Watson, MD, General Medical Practitioner, Surrey.
- James Muir Watt, Deputy Secretary, Chartered Auctioneers' and Estate Agents' Institute.
- Ann Courtenay Welch, MBE. For services to Gliding.
- Stanley Charles Western, Headmaster and Warden, Ivanhoe High School and Community College, Ashby-de-la-Zouch.
- Frederick Wilkinson. For services to the Royal Commonwealth Society.
- John Carroll Wilkinson, Lately Headmaster, Adwick High School, Doncaster.
- Mary Williams, lately Hospital Nursing Officer (Midwifery), Ministry of Health.
- Raymond Harcourt Woodall, Director and Chief Executive, Rotax Ltd.
- John Richard Wray, MBE, Commander, Metropolitan Police.

Diplomatic Service And Overseas List

- Francis Robert Addy, MB, ChB, Principal Medical Officer, Northern States of Nigeria.
- Basil Joyce Arrowsmith, Controller of Immigration, Sabah.
- Richard Mossop Auty, Cultural Attache, Her Majesty's Embassy, Budapest.
- Mary Joan Backhouse, Principal, Asaba Girls' Secondary School, Asaba, Nigeria.
- Robert Oliver Barritt, First Secretary (Labour), Her Majesty's Embassy, Brussels.
- John William Luscombe Bevan, Agricultural Economist, Federal Land Development Authority, Malaysia.
- Alfred Nicholas Beven, British subject resident in Chile.
- Ernest William Bithell, lately British subject resident in Israel.
- William Joseph Brittenden. For services to telecommunications in Gibraltar.
- Ronald Bernard Clark, British subject resident in Bolivia.
- Kenneth Collins, British subject resident in the United States.
- William Edwin Cornish, MBE, British Vice-Consul (Commercial), Her Majesty's Consulate-General, Milan.
- Dowding Stuart Cozier, chairman, Public Service Commission, Saint Vincent.
- The Honourable Henry Osmund Creque, Speaker, Legislative Council, British Virgin Islands.
- Theodora Fede Maria Cubitt (Sister Gabriel). For educational and welfare services in Ethiopia.
- Frank Gilbert Darnborough, DSC, British subject resident in South Africa.
- Robert Graham Dawson, British subject lately resident in Cameroon.
- Cuthbert Reginald Dickenson, United Kingdom citizen lately resident in Jamaica.
- Laura Annie Dickinson, Matron, Kasr-el-Aini Hospital, Cairo.
- John Doorbar, MBE, Senior Commercial Officer, Her Majesty's Embassy, Brussels.
- Arturo Sydney Dyer, MBE, First Secretary, Her Majesty's Embassy, Santiago.
- Geoffrey Francis Edwards, MBE, TD, Her Majesty's Consul-General and Economic and Financial Adviser, British Military Government, Berlin.
- Anthony Francis Eggleston, lately Principal, The English School, Nicosia.
- Richard Garratt, British subject resident in the United States.
- Donald Redmead Blair Gill, Head of Planning Unit, British Honduras.
- Michael Richard Edward Gough, Director, British Institute of Archaeology, Ankara.
- Captain John Groves, Director of Marine, West Malaysia.
- Lieutenant-Colonel Thomas Armitage Hall (Retired), British subject resident in Thailand.
- Richard Gordon Hampson, DFC, Director of Agriculture, Botswana.
- Desmond Edward St. Aubyn Harney, lately First Secretary, British High Commission, Nairobi.
- Gilbert Spence Harrison, British subject resident in Italy.
- Mary Katharine Hawkins, MBE, Nurse Tutor to the Save the Children Fund team in Jordan.
- Jack Arnold Hayward, vice-president, The Grand Bahama Port Authority Limited. For services to Great Britain.
- George William Haywood, United Kingdom citizen resident in Nigeria.
- George Turner Hodgson, MBE, Honorary British Consul, Concepcion.
- Laurence Frank Hope, First Secretary (Head of Commercial Section), British High Commission, Singapore.
- Gilbert Horrocks, lately Advocate of the Supreme Court of Aden.
- James Telfer Hyslop, lately Consul (Commercial), Her Majesty's Consulate-General, Johannesburg.
- Charles Winston Kempe, JP, Deputy Colonial Treasurer and Budget Officer, Bermuda.
- Gordon Hickman Lang, United Kingdom citizen resident in Malaysia.
- Li Fook-wo, JP. For services to the community in Hong Kong.
- Bert Raymond Lowe, Assistant Commissioner of Prisons, Sabah.
- Antony Mackenzie Smith, Regional Representative, British Council, Calcutta.
- Kenneth John Ramsay Maclennan, MBE, lately Chief Veterinary Tsetse Officer, Northern States of Nigeria.
- Alexander Berkeley Milne, First Secretary, (Designate), Her Majesty's Embassy, Jedda.
- William Pagram, British subject resident in Guatemala.
- William Paul Panton, lately Co-ordinator for Land and Regional Development, Malaysia.
- Reginald Wykeham Puleston, Honorary British Consul, La Plata.
- Patrick William Reardon, Permanent Secretary, Ministry of Commerce, Industry and Water Affairs, Botswana.
- Peter Howell Roberts, lately First Secretary, British High Commission, Colombo.
- George Ronald Ross. For voluntary public services in Hong Kong.
- Peter George Dawson Shallow, lately Deputy Chief Engineer (Hydro), National Electricity Board, Malaysia.
- Thomas Farbridge Stainthorpe, MBE, lately Secretary, Pakistan Tea Association.
- Michael Alexander Stern, Headmaster, Waterford School, Swaziland. For services to education.
- John Stewart, United Kingdom citizen resident in Malaysia.
- Frederick Cowan Sutcliffe, lately First Secretary, British High Commission, Georgetown.
- Geoffrey Reuben Tribe, lately British Council Regional Representative, Enugu.
- Barbara Ruth Wagstaffe, First Secretary, British High Commission, Malta.
- Frank Watkinson, Commissioner of Town and Country Planning, Malaysia.
- Fenton Gerard Whelan, deputy director of Education, Sabah.
- Gerald Edward Wilford, deputy director, Geological Survey, Sabah.
- Cyril Edward Foxcroft Williams, lately Commissioner of Geological Survey and Mines, Uganda.
- David John Williams, lately Principal, Enugu College of Technology, Nigeria.
- Wong Haking. For services to industry in Hong Kong.
- William Hindmoor Youdale, British subject resident in France.

State of New South Wales

- Major Arthur John Sandford Cotter, ED. For services to the community.
- George Ivan Ferris. For services to local government.
- George McClymont Hastie. For services to commerce.
- Brigadier Fredric Brock Hinton, MC, ED. For services to ex-servicemen and to the community.
- Harvey Lowe. For services to local government.
- Thomas Yeates Nelson, MB, ChM. For services to medicine.
- Charles Robert Emerton Warren. For services to the community.
- Marie Naomi Wing, MB, BS. For services to medicine.

State of Victoria

- Howard Francis William Dawson, JP, of South Camberwell. For services to the community, particularly to local government.
- Edna Lily Gordon, of Essendon. For services to the community.
- Rudolph Warren McKellar, JP. For services to scouting.
- Joyce Ethel Price, JP. For services to the Girl Guide Movement in Victoria.
- Howard Thomas Colin Woodfull, Director, Royal Agricultural Society of Victoria.

State of Queensland

- Norman Joseph King. For services to the scientific advancement of the sugar industry.
- Thomas Griffin Mulherin. For services to the sugar industry and to the community.
- Wallace Carl Skelsey. For services in the field of rural journalism.

State of South Australia

- John Hylton Hayes. For services to the community, especially to mentally retarded children.
- Henry James Peake, JP. For services to the community, and to the country press.
- Francis Benjamin Pearson, Chief Agronomist, Department of Agriculture.

State of Western Australia

- Reginald Allan Hobson, lately Director, School of Mines, Kalgoorlie.
- George Eric Maxwell Keys. For services to the community, especially to education.
- Eric John Stephens. For services to local government.

State of Tasmania

- Armel John Wall. For services to the community.
- Frederick James Clark White. For services to the community.

==== Member of the Order of the British Empire (MBE) ====
Military Division

Royal Navy

- Lieutenant Commander Austen James Armstrong.
- Lieutenant Commander Thomas Edward Brinkley.
- Lieutenant Commander Oliver Tresillian Power Carne.
- Lieutenant Commander (S.C.C.) Richard Henry Derbyshire, Royal Naval Reserve.
- Lieutenant Commander (SD) Leslie Drake.
- Engineer Lieutenant Commander James Hastings Stewart Fowler.
- Lieutenant Frank Davidson McGhee, Royal Marines Reserve.
- Wardmaster Lieutenant Commander Olaf Allen Saunders.
- Lieutenant Commander Desmond Edward Patrick Dehnay Scott.
- Instructor Lieutenant Commander Anthony George Thomas.
- Lieutenant Commander Harold Francis Turner.
- Lieutenant Commander John Michael Vaughan.
- Electrical Lieutenant Commander Harold Walker. Serving with R.N. Training Team, Kenya.

Army

- Major (acting) Cyril Albert Adams (344117), Army Cadet Force.
- Major Paul Donald Alexander (439931), Royal Corps of Signals.
- Major Thomas Sharpe Bartlett, TD, (207776), Royal Army Pay Corps, Territorial and Army Volunteer Reserve.
- 14857451 Warrant Officer Class I Robert Gordon Bate-Jones, The Devonshire and Dorset Regiment.
- Major Anthony John Blad (331023), Royal Tank Regiment.
- Major Jasper Miles Browell (390627), Royal Regiment of Artillery.
- Major (acting) Thomas Burns (431622), Army Cadet Force.
- 2694213 Warrant Officer Class I Albert Arnold Dagnall, Army Catering Corps.
- 14463356 Warrant Officer Class I Kenneth George Davies, The Lancashire Regiment (Prince of Wales's Volunteers).
- Major John Terence Delia Durbin (373488), The Gordon Highlanders, formerly on loan to the Malaysian Armed Forces.
- Major Keith Hayes Ellson, TD, (382203), The Fusilier Volunteers, now R.A.R.O.
- Major Michael Richard Goodliff (415659), Royal Regiment of Artillery, formerly on loan to the Malaysian Armed Forces.
- Major Bernard Charles Gordon Lennox (426886), Grenadier Guards.
- Major Frank Henry Griffiths (418752), Corps of Royal Engineers, on loan to the Malaysian Armed Forces.
- Captain Peter Alma Bedell Harkin (474278), Royal Army Pay Corps, Territorial and Army Volunteer Reserve.
- Major Michael William Henry (352879), Royal Regiment of Artillery.
- Major Peter Hewlett (335852), Royal Army Ordnance Corps.
- Major Albert Edward Hibbert (437082), The King's Regiment (Manchester and Liverpool).
- 2548174 Warrant Officer Class I Keith Philip Hopping, Royal Corps of Transport.
- Major Arthur Harold Horton (271939), The Cheshire Regiment.
- Major (Quartermaster) Robert Russell Hutton (436977), Corps of Royal Electrical and Mechanical Engineers.
- Lieutenant Nigel Henry Peter Jenks, MM, (483134), The Royal Anglian Regiment.
- Major (acting) Kenneth Ceredig Jones (326316), Army Cadet Force.
- 22071653 Warrant Officer Class I Patrick John Judge, Royal Army Medical Corps.
- 14872252 Warrant Officer Class I Peter Kelly, The Parachute Regiment.
- Major (Quartermaster) Alfred Joseph Lamb (415617), The Royal Green Jackets, now R.A.R.O.
- Captain Martin Alfred Lee, TD, (460987), The Queen's Own Yorkshire Yeomanry, Territorial and Army Volunteer Reserve.
- Major Thomas Condit McAughtry, DCM, (460231), North Irish Horse (T), Territorial and Army Volunteer Reserve.
- The Reverend Kenneth Macvicar, DFC, TD, Chaplain to The Forces 3rd Class (416868), Royal Army Chaplains' Department, Territorial and Army Volunteer Reserve, now R.A.R.O.
- LS/14730000 Warrant Officer Class I Raymond Leslie Marsh, The Duke of Edinburgh's Royal Regiment (Berkshire and Wiltshire), serving with The Gibraltar Regiment.
- Lieutenant Alan Martin (484768), The Queen's Regiment.
- 22567099 Warrant Officer Class II William James Mills, The Hampshire and Isle of Wight Territorials, Territorial and Army Volunteer Reserve.
- Lieutenant (Q.G.O.) Minbahadur Gurung (480181), Gurkha Engineers.
- Major (acting) Douglas Gordon Mullis (413814), Army Cadet Force.
- Major (acting) Bruce Mackenzie Niven (462326), 10th Princess Mary's Own Gurkha Rifles.
- Major (Quartermaster) Albert Charles Nockles (440552), Royal Army Ordnance Corps.
- Major Albert James Osbourne (379568), Royal Army Pay Corps.
- Captain Michael John Parker (469075), Queen's Own Hussars.
- Major Robert Alan Pascoe (424428), The Royal Green Jackets.
- W/319186 Warrant Officer Class I (acting) Theresa Mary Mehefin Powell-Price, Women's Royal Army Corps.
- Major (Quartermaster) Eric John Ransley, MC, (193677), The Queen's Regiment.
- Lieutenant (Quartermaster) Edward Rouse (474761), Royal Army Medical Corps, Territorial and Army Volunteer Reserve.
- Lieutenant-Colonel Walter Dennis Rushworth (290935), Corps of Royal Engineers.
- Captain (acting) Robert Randal Rylands (121147), Combined Cadet Force.
- 22288500 Warrant Officer Class II Ivan James Skinner, Corps of Royal Engineers.
- Captain Donald John Allan Smith (477192), Royal Army Pay Corps.
- Lieutenant-Colonel (acting) John Robert Alexander Smith (382631), Royal Regiment of Artillery.
- Captain (Quartermaster) Joseph Henry Smith (465646), The King's Own Yorkshire Light Infantry, Territorial and Army Volunteer Reserve.
- Major (Quartermaster) George Albert Mons Soper (454745), The Royal Scots (The Royal Regiment), The Cameronians (Scottish Rifles).
- Major (Quartermaster) Leslie John Spencer (456684), Royal Regiment of Artillery.
- Captain William Francis Stockdale (443740), The Royal Hampshire Regiment.
- Captain (Quartermaster) Donald Munro Stow (459397), The Green Howards (Alexandra, Princess of Wales's Own Yorkshire Regiment).
- Major (Quartermaster) James Leo Tanner (437932), The King's Own Yorkshire Light Infantry, now R.A.R.O.
- Major Jacques Jean Louis Thorpe (430178), The Parachute Regiment.
- Captain (Quartermaster) Charles Leslie Wiley (472349), The Prince of Wales's Own Regiment of Yorkshire, serving with The Hong Kong Regiment (Volunteers).
- Major Thomas Gwyn Williams (424512), The Queen's Royal Irish Hussars.

Royal Air Force

- Squadron Leader Reginald William Bradley (1817693).
- Squadron Leader Frederick William Briance (537756).
- Squadron Leader James Fawcett Firth (57920).
- Squadron Leader Donald Warren Granger (505562).
- Squadron Leader Gordon Henry Hopperton (551289).
- Squadron Leader James Joseph Kearney (4005827).
- Squadron Leader John Godwin Anthony Lane (58703).
- Squadron Leader Eric Francis Lapham (130258).
- Squadron Leader Franklyn Geoffrey Morriss Robinson (502099).
- Squadron Leader Donald Ian Scott (2497230).
- Squadron Leader James Scrimgeour, BEM, (591177).
- Squadron Leader John James Thomas (590800), for services with the British Joint Services Training Team, Ghana.
- Squadron Leader Richard Alfred Tomlin (578474).
- Squadron Leader Robert Charles Travis (2572635).
- Squadron Leader Ronald Victor Wardley (515172), (Retired).
- Squadron Leader Thomas Boyter Whittaker (527125).
- Acting Squadron Leader Frederick Albert George Clark (1013548), Royal Air Force Volunteer Reserve (Training Branch).
- Flight Lieutenant Henry Trevelyan Bowen, DFM, (54878).
- Flight Lieutenant John Francis Peter Browne (3147698).
- Flight Lieutenant Ronald Thomas Garton (570320).
- Flight Lieutenant Jim Clifton Hemsley (1852505).
- Flight Lieutenant David Antony Kidd (4193449).
- Flight Lieutenant William James Massey (2536008).
- Flight Lieutenant James Allan Will (3021206).
- Flight Lieutenant Adolf Pravoslav Zeleny (100025).
- Acting Flight Lieutenant Sean Joseph O'Neill (4009602).
- Warrant Officer Fred Arthur Barlow Albinson (A0966351).
- Warrant Officer David Moyes Allan (K0948913).
- Warrant Officer Horace Fred Breen (G0517034), RAF Regiment.
- Warrant Officer James Edward Brown (E0553590).
- Warrant Officer Gerard Roy Cater, BEM, (S0570758).
- Warrant Officer George Eric Dobson (X0530577).
- Warrant Officer Michael Ginsburg (S0973838), for services while on loan to the Royal Malaysian Air Force.
- Warrant Officer Robert Hogg (M0591144).
- Warrant Officer Hugh Donnan Millar (N0531673).
- Warrant Officer Daniel Pinfield (F0614901).
- Warrant Officer Donald Frank Vince (Y0647367).
- Warrant Officer John Pennock Winspear (T0520159).
- Warrant Officer Edgar Bertie John Wright (K0910243).
- Master Air Quartermaster James Verity (M4013722).

Civil Division

- Isaac Henry Abraham, Senior Executive Officer, Welsh Office.
- Henry George Adams, South Eastern Area Secretary, Royal Air Forces Association.
- Herbert Andrew, Higher Executive Officer, Ministry of Social Security.
- Alfred Frank Arnold, Superintendent of Turbo-propeller Engine Test Department, Rolls-Royce Ltd., Derby.
- David William Astley, Engineering Technical Grade I, Inspectorate of Armaments, Woolwich, Ministry of Defence.
- Douglas Atkinson, Chief Constable, River Tyne Police.
- Sidney Ayles, Crown Local Agent and Bailiff, Portland, Dorset.
- Peggy Baker, Lately Matron, Queensberry House, Edinburgh.
- Eileen Christine Bannerman, BEM, County Director, Roxburgh Branch, British Red Cross Society.
- Christian Vynne Barclay, Senior Psychiatric Social Worker, Hellesdon Hospital, Norwich.
- Major William Thomas Barham. Lately Clerical Officer, Regimental Headquarters, The King's Own Scottish Borderers.
- Albert George Barnett, Chief Superintendent, Sussex Constabulary.
- George Frederick Barrett, Telecommunications Technical Officer "A", Diplomatic Wireless Service.
- Philip Winstanley Barton, General Secretary, Southern Region, National Federation of Building Trades Employers.
- Ernest George Bass, Senior Production Engineer, Hawker Siddeley Aviation Ltd., Hertfordshire.
- Arthur Harry Beeton, President, Spilsby Hospitals League of Friends.
- Louie Bellman, Executive Officer, Patent Office, Board of Trade.
- Dorothy Vera Bentley, Clerk to the Civil Service Sports Council.
- Jessie Biddle, Voluntary Tuberculosis Organiser, Burgess Hill, Sussex, Rural Community Council.
- Lilian Daisy Billings, Clerical Officer, Board of Inland Revenue.
- Ivor James Bishop, Executive Officer, Board of Trade.
- Thomas Dingwall Black, Principal Youth Employment Officer, Edinburgh.
- Ian Kenneth Blaen, Group Secretary, Treasurer and Supplies Officer, St. Lawrence's Hospital Management Committee, Caterham.
- Bessie Eva Bloy, lately Superintendent of Hansard Typists, House of Commons.
- Isabel Grace Bobbett, Voluntary Fund Organiser, Holidays for the Paralysed Penny-a-Week Scheme.
- Ouida Maud Bond, County Organiser, Cheshire Women's Royal Voluntary Service.
- Enoch Bostock, JP, chairman, Ilkeston Savings Committee.
- Philip Grantham Bowden, Second Assistant Engineer (Drawing Office), South Western Region, Central Electricity Generating Board.
- Iris Brassington, Clerical Officer, Ministry of Power.
- Clara Breckell, Higher Clerical Officer, North Western Telecommunications Region, General Post Office.
- Edward William Martin Britain, Engine Department Manager, Fodens Ltd., Sandbach, Cheshire.
- Edward Albert Brown, Higher Executive Officer, Board of Inland Revenue.
- George William Brown, Welfare Officer Grade I, No. 4 Welfare Area, R.A.F. Cheadle Hulme, Ministry of Defence.
- Pipe-Major Robert Urquhart Brown. For services to piping.
- William Thomas Brown, Vice-chairman, Macclesfield District Savings Committee.
- Leonard Thomas Frank Bryan, chairman and managing director, Detexomat Ltd. For services to Export.
- William Barclay Bryson, Headmaster, Saltcoats Junior Secondary School, Ayrshire.
- Peter Buckle, Station Controller, British Forces Broadcasting Service, Singapore, Ministry of Defence.
- Bessie Randal Bullough, Deputy Head, Wheldon Lane Junior and Infant School, Castleford, Yorkshire.
- Harold Bullough, Director, North Western Region, National Federation of Building Trades Employers.
- Edith Mary Bunce, District Nurse and Midwife, Wroxall, Isle of Wight.
- Alan Bob Burt, Executive Officer, University Grants Committee.
- Alfred William Burton, lately Secretary, London Corn Trade Association.
- Bevington Burtt, lately deputy chairman, Lincolnshire (Kesteven) Agricultural Executive Committee.
- Alderman Herbert Butler. For social and local government services in Lancashire.
- Alderman Ernest Buxton, JP, Works Accountant, Lackenby Works, Northern and Tubes Group, British Steel Corporation.
- Margaret Dunlop Campbell, Head of Hotel and Catering College, Portrush, County Antrim.
- Evelyn Mildred Carr, Lady Superintendent, Miss Agnes Weston's Royal Sailors' Rest, Devonport.
- Peter Carr, Matron/Chief Male Nurse, Kirklands Hospital, Bothwell.
- Douglas Walter Carter, Road Safety Organiser, North Midland Region, Royal Society for the Prevention of Accidents.
- Alderman John Carter, JP, Mayor of South Molton, Devon.
- Marguerite Casteel, Information Officer, Central Office of Information.
- John Malcolm Rex Chapman, Honorary Secretary, Islington Borough Savings Committee.
- Harold William Chappell, Contract Export Engineer, Efco Royce Furnaces Ltd. For services to Export.
- Robert Christie, Works Technical (Building and Civil Engineering) Grade A, Ministry of Public Building and Works.
- Hazel Church, Head Teacher, St. Giles Nursery School, Lincoln.
- Charles Edward Clack, Clerical Officer, Ministry of Housing and Local Government.
- Lilian Kate Clapp, Shorthand Typist, Department of Education and Science.
- Edward Kissack Clarke, JP, Lately National Secretary, General Works Section, Amalgamated Union of Building Trade Workers.
- Joyce Lavinia Rebecca Clarke, Catering Officer, St Clement's Hospital, Ipswich.
- Patricia Grace Pine-Coffin, Regional Meals-on-Wheels Specialist, Kent, Women's Royal Voluntary Service.
- James Ernest Comber, Manager, Travel Trade Department, British Travel Association.
- William Arthur Conlon. For services to youth in Northern Ireland.
- Peter Constantinoff, Senior Lecturer, Department of Languages, The Royal Military Academy, Sandhurst.
- Carla Mary Cornelius, Headmistress, Drew Street County Junior School, Brixham, Devon.
- Thomas John Clifford Court, Local and Agricultural Correspondent, Hereford.
- Marjorie Eva Crate, Second Secretary, Diplomatic Service.
- George Harris Cummings, chairman, County Down West Regional Savings Committee.
- Albert Edward Dale, Higher Executive Officer, Ministry of Overseas Development.
- Diana Shirley Dalgliesh, Higher Executive Officer, Lord Chancellor's Department.
- Bertram Frederick Daly, Accountant and Establishment Officer, Commonwealth Institute.
- Ethelberta Dalziel, TD, Warden, Avon Tyrrell National Association of Youth Clubs.
- Frederick Davey. For services to agriculture in Cornwall.
- David Douglas Davidson, managing director, Zimmer Orthopaedic Ltd. For services to Export.
- David Thomas Davies, Choral Conductor, Wales.
- Henry George Davis, Reservations Systems Manager, British European Airways.
- Rashell Selby Davison Davison, Secretary, London Anglers' Association.
- Alfred Henry Daw, Chief Safety Officer, Guest Keen Iron and Steel Works, East Moors, Cardiff.
- Rose Elizabeth Dick, Poultry Advisory Officer, Ministry of Agriculture for Northern Ireland.
- Henry John Dickman, Clerk, Chief Financial Officer and Rating Officer, Haverfordwest Rural District Council.
- John Horend Dixon, ERD, Assistant Staff Administration Officer, British Broadcasting Corporation.
- Joseph William Dixon, Councillor, East Kesteven Rural District Council.
- John Stuteley Dodd, General Secretary, Langley House Trust.
- Percy Walter Dodge, Traffic Manager, East Kent Road Car Company Ltd.
- Michael Charles Doody, Senior District Engineer, Mersey and Weaver River Authority. For services during the recent Foot-and-Mouth disease epidemic.
- Arthur William Dorey, Service Supplies Manager, C.A.V. Ltd. For services to Export.
- James McDiarmid Dow. For services to National Savings in Scotland.
- William Drummond. For services to the community in Lancashire.
- Thomas Clarence Dunford, Chief Superintendent and Deputy Chief Constable, Swansea County Borough Police Force.
- Thomas Henry Elsdon, Senior Executive Officer, Ministry of Social Security.
- Evelyn Reece Entwistle, Supervisor of Midwives, Bradford County Borough Council.
- Mary Ervine, Superintendent of Typists, Supreme Court of Judicature of Northern Ireland.
- Kathleen May Fagan. For services to the British Legion.
- Clifford Fee, Deputy Senior Training Officer, Department of Employment and Productivity.
- Ethel Aileen Fenton, Executive Officer, National Institute of Agricultural Engineering, Silsoe, Bedfordshire.
- George Alexander Ferguson, JP, chairman, Cookstown Urban District Council, County Tyrone.
- Constance Joyce Field, Senior Executive Officer, Ministry of Transport.
- John Hamilton James Finch, Chief Foreman of Works, Ministry of Public Building and Works.
- Frederick Leonard Cleveland Firmin, Sales Manager (Radar Division), The Marconi Company Ltd., Chelmsford.
- Ann Flynn, lately Member, Electricity Consultative Council for the South of Scotland District.
- Sarah Barbara Foskett, County Borough Organiser, Bradford County Borough, Women's Royal Voluntary Service.
- William Henry Foster, Chief Inspector, Coventry Gauge & Tool Company Ltd.
- John Dudley French, Administrative Officer, Lancashire and Cheshire Territorial Auxiliary and Volunteer Reserve Association.
- Arthur Dales Gash, Clerical Officer, Lambeth County Court, Lord Chancellor's Department.
- Catherine Wright Gibson, Chief Superintendent of Typists, Ministry of Defence.
- William Gilchrist, Headmaster, Douglas Water Secondary School, Lanarkshire.
- Ida Elizabeth Gilmour, Grade 4 Officer, Department of Employment and Productivity.
- Ruby Mary Adeline Ginner. For services to Dancing.
- Leonard Roy Archibald George Godwin, JP, Lately President, Stoke City Old People's Meals Committee.
- John Kilgour Goldwin, chairman, Essex Regional Educational Committee for National Savings.
- Rowland Robert Good, Honorary Secretary, Morecambe and Heysham Local Savings Committee.
- Margaret Gordon (Sister Genevieve), Assistant Teacher, St. Gerard's Orthopaedic Hospital School, Coleshill, Birmingham.
- Colin Forrest Goulding, Engineer Technical Grade A, Ministry of Defence.
- Reginald Charles Cowers, Assistant Secretary, The Publishers' Association. For services to Export.
- Janet Wilson Graham, Matron, Castle Douglas Hospital, Kirkcudbrightshire.
- Isabel Alison Logan Gray, Honorary Secretary, Scottish Association of Voluntary Child Care Organisations.
- Janet Paton Gray, BEM, Woman Assistant Inspector of Constabulary for Scotland.
- Eric Gregory, Chief Superintendent, Lancashire Constabulary.
- Thomas Lavender Ernest Gregory, Chief Inspector of Weights and Measures, Nottinghamshire County Council.
- Hector Harry Grice, chairman, Darlington, Auckland and District War Pensions Committee.
- Cecil Hall. For services to HM Borstal, Feltham.
- George Hall, Superintendent of Works, Carlisle and District State Management Scheme, Home Office.
- Thomas Hall, JP, chairman, Bedale Rural District Council.
- Lilian Mary Hamilton, County Organiser, Home Help Service, Hampshire County Council.
- Robert William Hankin, chairman and managing director, Swish Products Ltd., Tamworth, Staffordshire.
- Captain Hans Alfred Hansen, Master, MV Rogate, Stephenson Clarke Ltd.
- Arthur Septimus Harbottle. For services to the King George's Fund for Sailors.
- Alice Ethel Hardy, lately Matron, London Road Hospital, Boston.
- Dorothy Muriel Harpur, Councillor, Alsager Urban District Council.
- Ivy Olive Doreen Harrison. For services in the field of race relations.
- John William Harrison. For services to the British Legion in Wolverhampton and Staffordshire.
- Thomas James Harrison, Assistant Master, Tirmorfa Junior Mixed School, Aberavoru.
- Sydney James Hawkins. For services to the Magistracy.
- Ashley Head, Accountant, Royal Commonwealth Society.
- Jack Henderson, General Works Manager, C. A. Parsons & Company Ltd., Newcastle upon Tyne. For services to Export.
- May Henry, Headmistress, Town County Primary School, Sutton Coldfield.
- Arthur Basil Herrod, Manager, Southampton, Remploy Ltd.
- Jessie Hill, Councillor, Basford Rural District Council.
- May Edith Hilton, Principal, St. Christopher's Nursery Training College, Tunbridge Wells, (Dr. Barnado's).
- Ruth Jane Victoria Hind. For social services in Cumberland.
- Donald Laurence Hodge, Experimental Cfecer, Explosives Research and Development Establishment, Waltham Abbey, Ministry of Technology.
- Arthur Hodson, chairman, Stoke-on-Trent Local Savings Committee.
- Gladys Margaret Hogg. For services to Skating.
- Frank McCallum Holmes, Assistant Executive Engineer, Telephone Manager's Office, Edinburgh, General Post Office.
- Norah Mary Hopper, Secretary, Royal Society of Tropical Medicine and Hygiene.
- William Houston, JP, chairman, Ballymena Rural District Council, County Antrim.
- Ivy Winifred Howard, Secretary, British Flower Industry Association.
- Margaret Verdun Howey, chairman, Northumberland North District Savings Committee.
- Harold Leslie Hoyle, chairman, Blackpool and Fylde Society for the Blind.
- Jack Humphrey, JP, Member, Somerset County Agricultural Executive Committee.
- Donald Arthur Edmund Hunter, Establishment Manager, Fife Factories, Elliott-Automation, Scotland.
- Herbert Anthony Hyams, chairman, Southend-on-Sea and District War Pensions Committee.
- Josie Jackson, Secretary and Housing Manager, Mulberry Housing Trust.
- Frank William Jacobs, Chief Draughtsman and Estimator, William White (Switchgear) Ltd., Brixton.
- Yvette Jacobson. For services to the Retreat Hospital, York.
- Alan James, Senior Engineering Liaison Officer, Independent Television Authority.
- John James Jewitt, chairman and managing director, Thomas R. Ellin (Footprint Works) Ltd., Sheffield. For services to Export.
- James Morrison Johnston, Group Leader Missile Design (Armaments Division), Hawker Siddeley Dynamics Ltd., Coventry, Warwickshire.
- Robert Edmund Johnston, Headmaster, Bishoploch Primary School, Glasgow.
- Amy Frances Jane Jones. For services to the community in Ashburton, Devon.
- Caradoc Jones, Executive Officer, Ministry of Agriculture, Fisheries and Food. For services during the recent Foot-and-Mouth disease epidemic.
- Constance Mary Irene Parry-Jones, Matron, Drybridge House Old People's Home, Monmouth.
- David Thomas Jones, Field Officer, Grade II, Ministry of Agriculture, Fisheries and Food. For services during the recent Foot-and-Mouth disease epidemic.
- Edward Dennis Jones, Establishment and Administrative Assistant, Television News, British Broadcasting Corporation.
- Ronald Jones, Engineer II, Reactor Group, Dounreay, United Kingdom Atomic Energy Authority.
- Harold Graham Jordan, DSO, Lately Departmental Specialist, Government Communications Headquarters, Diplomatic Service.
- Hasan Said Karmi, Senior Programme Assistant, Arabic Service, External Broadcasting, British Broadcasting Corporation.
- Sheila Kaye, Representative of United States buyers. For services to Export.
- Douglas George Grimon Keddie. For services to the St. Nicholas Boys' Club, Newport, Shropshire.
- Sybil Mary Keene, Superintendent of Typists, National Gas Turbine Establishment, Pyestock, Farnborough, Ministry of Technology.
- Kenneth Fred Kemp, Senior Executive Officer, Ministry of Social Security.
- Wilfrid Kerr, Press Association Staff Correspondent, Newcastle upon Tyne.
- Benjamin Erlam Kinley, Road Safety Officer, Liverpool.
- Leslie Kirby, BEM, lately Chief Superintendent, Lincolnshire Constabulary.
- Joan Kemble Knight, Secretary and Supervisor, Accountant's Department, Southampton, British Transport Docks Board.
- Mary Elizabeth Knight, JP. For services to the Magistracy.
- Charles Balfour Laird, MM, chairman, Executive Committee, Scottish Council for the Care of Spastics.
- Mary Langdon, National Savings District Member for West Cornwall.
- Ronald Archie Lashmar, Assistant Works Manager, J. Samuel White & Company Ltd., Cowes, Isle of Wight.
- Kenneth Manley Ledson, Assistant City Engineer (Highways), Manchester.
- Barbara Mary Lee, Head Teacher Orthoptist, Moorfields Eye Hospital, President, British Orthoptic Society.
- Doris Phoebe Leisten, District Nurse, West Sussex.
- Elizabeth Winifred Lincoln, Health Visitor, Hayward Team in Cancer Research, Guernsey.
- Leslie Thomas Linsell, Clerk-in-Charge, Lost Property Office, Waterloo, Southern Region, British Railways Board.
- Isabelle Margaret Little, MB, ChB. For services to family planning.
- David Glyn Lloyd, Information Officer (Wales), National Farmers' Union of England and Wales. For services during the recent Foot-and-Mouth disease epidemic.
- The Reverend John Stewart Lochrie, JP, Minister and Secretary, Glasgow and West of Scotland, Mission to the Adult Deaf and Dumb.
- Dora Lockett, Headmistress, Deanesfield Infants' School, Hillingdon.
- Ronald Charles George Lodge, Senior Executive Officer, Ministry of Defence.
- Edward John Lord, President, Llandudno Sea Cadet Unit.
- William Wilfred Lowey, Steelwork Estimating Manager, Cammell Laird & Company Ltd., Birkenhead.
- Allister Thorburn McAllister, Commercial Manager, Darlington and Simpson Rolling Mills Ltd., Darlington. For services to Export.
- Catherine Ellen McAvoy, Welfare Officer, 2nd Battalion 2nd King Edward VII's Own Gurkha Rifles, Women's Royal Voluntary Service.
- William Smith MacDonald, Lately Group Commandant, No. 29 Group, Royal Observer Corps.
- Harold McGinley, Technical Class Grade A (Shipwright), Ministry of Defence.
- John McGrath, Regional Plant and Labour Manager, George Wimpey & Company Ltd., Birmingham. For services during the recent Foot-and-Mouth disease epidemic.
- Captain Robert Peddie MacGregor, MC, Honorary Treasurer, Northern Ireland War Memorial Fund.
- James McGuire, Scottish Representative, Press Association Ltd.
- Norman Angus McKenna, managing director, Svenska Imperial Chemical Industries, Gothenburg. For services to Export.
- Alexandra McKenzie. For services to the Scottish Women's Rural Institute.
- John Douglas Stevenson Mackenzie, chairman, Horsham and District Local Savings Committee.
- James Mackey, chairman, Londonderry Rural District Council.
- Arthur Mackmurdie, Senior Overseas Group Representative, Morganite Exports Ltd. For services to Export.
- Francis James Mailling, Training Service Officer Grade II, Department of Employment and Productivity.
- Hubert Jack Mansfield, Assistant General Manager (Commercial), Railway Division, J. Stone & Company (Deptford) Ltd. For services to Export.
- John McGregor Watson Marshall, Higher Executive Officer, General Register Office, Edinburgh.
- Reginald Alexander Mathieson, chairman, Southampton, Isle of Wight, Winchester and District War Pensions Committee.
- Albert George Matthews, Clerk, Dawley Urban District Council.
- Charles Alfred Joseph Meadows, Engineering Technical Grade I, South-East Region, Electrical Inspection Directorate, Ministry of Technology.
- Siegbert John Menko, managing director, Flexello Castors (Export) Ltd. For services to Export.
- Sarah Elizabeth Metcalfe, Alderman, Durham County Council.
- Colin Middleton, Artist.
- James Drysdale Miller, Higher Clerical Officer, Board of Inland Revenue.
- Horace David Victor Millett, Station Engineer, Portsmouth, Southern Gas Board.
- Michael Austin Molloy, Clerical Officer, HM Treasury.
- Margaret Moore, JP. For social services in Belfast.
- Norman Morpeth, Head Postmaster, Head Post Office, Loughborough, General Post Office.
- Edwin Vaughan Morris. For services to Brass Bands.
- William John Morris, ERD, Honorary Secretary, Bridgend Savings Committee.
- Frederick William Morrish, Grade 3 Officer, Department of Employment and Productivity.
- Thomas Charles Fulton Morrison, Marine Radio Officer, Marconi International Marine Company Ltd.
- William Morrison, Baths Manager, Inverness.
- Philip Hector Mulford, Supplies Officer for Wales, Ministry of Public Building and Works.
- Ellen Murray. For services to the Girls' Guildry.
- Arthur Edgar Naylor, Secretary, Community Services Department, Young Men's Christian Association.
- Arthur Stanley William Newman, Regional Secretary, Eastern Counties, National Federation of Building Trade Operatives.
- Charles Edwin Newman, Principal Foreman of Manufacture, Ministry of Defence.
- Stanley Robinson Noble, Training Officer, English Electric Company Ltd., Bradford.
- Arthur George Northam, Senior Executive Officer, Board of Customs and Excise.
- Joseph O'Connor, JP. Councillor, Tower Hamlets Council.
- Frank Berry Odell. For services to the Church Lads' Brigade in Coventry.
- Alice Agnes O'Hara, Ward Sister, Tropical Diseases Unit, Queen Mary's Hospital, Roehampton.
- William Alfred Olds. For social services in Nottingham.
- Helen Evangeline O'Neil. For services to Archaeology.
- John Reginald Painter, Higher Executive Officer, Ministry of Social Security.
- Alderman Frederick William Henry Park, Manager, Brixham Bulk Plant, Esso Petroleum Company Ltd.
- Francis Frederick George Parsons, Chief Forester, Forestry Commission.
- Harold Archibald Parsons, Principal Production Inspector, Grade "A", Ministry of Defence.
- John William Patterson, JP, Member, Seaton Valley Urban District Council.
- Bernard John Joseph Pearsall, Manager, Export Division, Relite Electric Ltd. For services to Export.
- Charles Frederick Peddie, County Treasurer, North Riding of Yorkshire, St. John Ambulance Brigade.
- Findlay Pettigrew, MB, ChB, General Medical Practitioner, Meikle Wartle, Aberdeenshire.
- Ethel May Phillips, Honorary Secretary, Oswestry Division, Soldiers', Sailors' and Airmen's Families Association.
- Alderman Frank William Pickles. For services to local government in Lytham St. Annes.
- William Talbot Pilliner, Acting Executive Officer, Ministry of Agriculture, Fisheries and Food. For services during the recent Foot-and-Mouth disease epidemic.
- Alderman Susan Pimblett, Councillor, Haydock Urban District Council.
- Cynthia Muriel Blackie Porter, chairman, Westmorland, Lancaster and District War Pensions Committee.
- Edmund Porter, chairman, Bridgwater and District Employment Committee.
- Mary Poulson, Headmistress, Hardwick Infant School, Derby.
- George Charles Powell, Production Manager, F. Burnerd & Company Ltd. For services to Export.
- Fred Poynton. For services to industrial Civil Defence in the Midland Region, Central Electricity Generating Board.
- Grace Quixley, Housing Manager, Lincoln County Borough.
- Captain Andrew Francis Ramsay, Commodore of the Fleet, North of Scotland, Orkney & Shetland Shipping Company Ltd.
- Eric Jack Ranger, Inspector (Higher Grade), Board of Inland Revenue.
- Doreen Drennan Rankin, Head Orthoptist, Belfast Hospital Management Committee.
- Stanley Revels, JP, District Commandant, Ulster Special Constabulary.
- Hugh Haslett Ritchie, Honorary Treasurer, Working Men's Committee, Royal Victoria Hospital, Belfast.
- Percy Roberts, JP, Member, Flint County Agricultural Executive Committee.
- Jeannie Robertson (Regina Christina Higgins), Folk Singer.
- William Priestley Robinson, Senior Navigation Superintendent, British Overseas Airways Corporation.
- Norman Arthur Rowden, Lately Superintending Measurer and Recorder, Ministry of Defence.
- George Sanderson, Supervisor, Wallsend Training and Occupation Centre for the Mentally Subnormal.
- Cecil John Hunt Selfe, Commercial Services Manager, Scottish Region, British Railways Board.
- Thelma Charlotte Shipley, Ward Sister, Rathbone Hospital, Liverpool.
- Walter Siddall, Head of Department of Pure and Applied Science, Northampton College of Technology.
- Violet Mary Sinden, Ward Sister, St Bartholomew's Hospital, Rochester, Kent.
- Charles Macdonald Smales, JP, Club Leader, Grangetown Boys' Club, Middlesbrough.
- Brian Mercer Smith, Deputy Principal, Ministry of Health and Social Services for Northern Ireland.
- Eric Charles Byers Smith, Group Chief Engineer, R. Hanson & Son, Ltd., Haulage Contractors, Wakefield.
- Henry George Smith, Chief Clerk, Hertfordshire Quarter Sessions.
- John Bingless Smith. For services to agriculture in Lancashire.
- Captain Jim Sprake, Lately Master, Royal Corps of Transport Fleet, Ministry of Defence.
- James Burns Stark, JP, A Director and Secretary, Lawrie & Symington Ltd., Livestock Auctioneers, Lanark.
- Phyllis Irene Tory Stehr. For services to the Scout Association in Dorset.
- Hugh William Stevenson, Chief Superintendent, Metropolitan Police.
- Ethel Jean Stewart (Mrs. Cichla), General Manager, Highland Home Industries.
- James Anderson Stewart, Pharmaceutical Member, Middlesex (National Health Service) Executive Council.
- Oswald Townsend Storrs, Area Safety Engineer, North Nottinghamshire Area, National Coal Board.
- Philip Strange, Tax Officer (Higher Grade), Board of Inland Revenue.
- Alfred Denis Stroud, Export Sales Manager, Santon Ltd., Newport, Monmouthshire. For services to Export.
- Alec Sunderland, Assistant Chief Engineer, Engineering Group, Risley, United Kingdom Atomic Energy Authority.
- Richard Frederick Symons. For services to the welfare of overseas students in Plymouth.
- Phyllis Eleanor Tarn, Grade 4 Officer, Department of Employment and Productivity.
- Vera Taylor, Senior Probation Officer (Training), Inner London Probation Area.
- Irene Elisabeth Thirsk, Assistant, Personnel Department, British Council.
- Gilbert Thomas, lately chairman, Bristol Port Welfare Committee, Merchant Navy Welfare Board.
- Stanley Charles Thomas, Honorary General Secretary, City of Cardiff Old People's Welfare Committee.
- William John Thomas, Clerk, Elland Urban District Council.
- John William Throssell, Clerk, Elsworth Parish Council.
- Reginald George Tickner, Secretary of Appeals Department and Organiser of the Poppy Appeal, British Legion.
- Ivy Lilian Till, Branch Organiser for Diversional Therapy, Monmouthshire Branch, British Red Cross Society.
- George Kenneth Timperley, Director and Secretary, National Federation of Clay Industries.
- Almond Tinkler, Technical Director, Langham Engineering Company (Liverpool) Ltd.
- Edith Trotter, Ward Sister, Cherry Knowle Hospital, Sunderland.
- Bright Henry William Tullett, chairman, Rickmansworth and Chorleywood Streets Sub-Committee for National Savings.
- William Turnbull, chairman, Blyth Youth Employment Committee.
- Eric Benjamin Twemlow, Secretary, Sir Josiah Mason's Trust, Olton, Warwickshire.
- William Ure, JP, chairman, Falkirk and District Local Employment Committee.
- Sidney Malcolm Wade, Exports Director, Charles Tanneries Ltd. For services to Export.
- Captain Alexander Wilson Walker, Master, MV Pole Star, Northern Lighthouse Board.
- Jabez Wallis, Senior Executive Officer, Ministry of Housing and Local Government.
- Yoneo Watanabe. For services to poultry breeding.
- John William Frederick Watson, Chief Superintendent, Overseas Telegraphs, General Post Office.
- Maggie Watson, Chief Honorary Librarian, United Leeds Hospitals.
- Arthur James Cooper Watts, managing director. Maidenhead Brick and Tile Works, Burgess Hill, Sussex.
- Richard Staple Watts, Deputy Assistant Chief Officer, London Fire Brigade.
- Henry Herbert Webb. For services to youth in Birmingham.
- Norman James Lind Weir, JP, lately County Commissioner for Edinburgh and Leith, Scout Association.
- Cyril Frederick White, Executive Engineer, Telephone Manager's Office, Guildford, General Post Office.
- Margaret White, Divisional Secretary, West Ham Division, The Forces Help Society and Lord Roberts Workshops.
- Brenda Odell Whiteley, vice-president, Casualties Union.
- Alan John Whysall, Export Sales Manager, Crosland Filters Ltd. For services to Export.
- Walter Samuel Wildman, Lately Assistant Works Manager, Derby, British Railways Board.
- Christopher Henry Willcox, JP, General Secretary, Bristol and District Federation of Boys' Clubs.
- Alfred Owen Williams, Headmaster, Brynllywarch E.S.N. School, Kerry, Montgomeryshire.
- The Reverend Canon Brinley John Williams, Chaplain, Halifax, Nova Scotia, Missions to Seamen.
- Howard Joseph Williams, Manager, Bag Department, Colodense Ltd., Bristol.
- Howard Winstone. For services to Boxing.
- Anthony Holman Wood, Sales Director, C. W. Pittard & Company Ltd., Yeovil, Somerset. For services to Export.
- Charles Stanley Wood, Grade 9 Officer, Diplomatic Service.
- Ian David Woodhead, Service Manager, Stevenage Works, Guided Weapons Division, British Aircraft Corporation (Operating) Ltd.
- Lieutenant-Commander Sydney John Robert George Woodhouse, Royal Naval Reserve (Retired), Lately Queen's Diplomatic Service Messenger.
- James Wright Woods, Chief Superintendent, Head Post Office, Belfast, General Post Office.
- Francis Woolaghan, Headmaster, Elaine Avenue County Primary Junior Mixed School, Strood, Kent.
- Sydney James Worrall, Export Sales Director, Jonas Woodhead Ltd., Ossett, Yorkshire. For services to Export.
- Alderman Ernest Edward Wright, Councillor, Corby Urban District Council.
- Henry Charles Wright, Executive Engineer, Telephone Manager's Office, South Central Area, London, General Post Office.
- Leslie William Henry Wright, Advisory Manager (Export), A. Gallenkamp & Company Ltd. For services to Export.

Diplomatic Service And Overseas List

- Lillian Adelle Archer. For services to the community in the Bahama Islands.
- Alexander Astwood, Superintendent of Public Works, Turks and Caicos Islands.
- John Bannister, lately Acting Assistant Commissioner of Prisons, Kenya.
- Peter Alfred Bell, United Kingdom citizen resident in Nigeria.
- John Miller Bennion, GM, lately Fire Superintendent and Accident Prevention Officer, East African Common Services Organisation.
- John Kellock Black, lately Commissioner of Lands, Aden.
- Peter Brown, Principal Planning. Officer, Natural Resources Division, Ministry of Economic Affairs, Malawi.
- Captain Stanley Burns, lately Acting Ports Harbourmaster, Marine and Ports Authority, Bermuda.
- Robert Francis Camacho, lately Director of Agriculture' and Irrigation, South Arabia.
- James Cameron, British subject resident in the United Arab Republic.
- Chan Yat-san. For voluntary public services in Hong Kong.
- Henchell Louchinvar Christian, Social Development Officer, Dominica.
- Felix Francesco Cirilli De Nores, United Kingdom citizen resident in Cyprus.
- Albert Donald Clark, Deputy Commissioner of Pdlice, Botswana.
- Leonard Deighton Clegg, Commercial Officer, Her Majesty's Consulate-General, Johannesburg.
- Beatrix Collingham, Librarian, British Council, Athens.
- Dora Beryl Davidson, Administration Assistant, Her Majesty's Embassy, Bogota.
- Joseph Lewis Edgar, British subject resident in the Netherlands.
- Basil Roger Price Edwards, lately Assistant Commissioner (Administration), Royal Malaysia Police.
- Marion Muir Erskine, British Vice-Consul, Her Majesty's Consulate, Honolulu.
- Douglas James Farnbank, Superintendent, Royal Malaysia Police.
- Ellis Findlay, Processing Adviser, Federal Land Development Authority, Malaysia.
- Kenneth Gilbert Fuller, Headmaster, British Joint Services Primary School, Accra.
- Laura Gertrude Gale, Brigadier, Salvation Army, Colombo.
- Johanna Gessner, Assistant Commercial Officer, Her Majesty's Consulate-General, Seattle.
- Peter Russell Goldsworthy, Principal Research Fellow, Institute for Agricultural Research, Samaru, Nigeria.
- Terence Hamilton, British subject resident in the United States.
- William Lloyd Harding, British Vice-Consul, Her Majesty's Embassy, Madrid.
- James Arthur Hardman, lately Second Secretary (Commercial) Her Majesty's Embassy, Bonn.
- Peter Gaisford Harrison, Senior Architect, Botswana.
- James Michael Herlihy, lately Superintendent of Police, Aden.
- Arthur Ollig Edgar Hill, British subject resident in Greece.
- Joseph Vanier Hodge, Permanent Secretary to the Premier and Cabinet Secretary, Antigua.
- Frank Holt, lately Accountant, Her Majesty's Embassy, Ankara.
- Lawrence Edwin Arthur Holt-Kentwell, Senior Principal Social Welfare Officer (Probation), Hong Kong.
- James Brian Horrocks, Second Secretary and Her Majesty's Vice-Consul, Her Majesty's Embassy, Kinshasa.
- John Frederick Hounlow, lately Chief Engineer (Roads) Kenya.
- Clifton Adalbert Hunter. For services to education and welfare in the Cayman Islands.
- Roger Edward Hunter, DFC, lately Regional Director, British Council, Nyanza Province, Kenya.
- Ethel Johnson, Matron, Medical Department, Gibraltar.
- Robert William Fox Kitchin, Senior Administrative Officer, Ministry of Economic Affairs, Malawi.
- Lam Shu-chun. For voluntary public services in Hong Kong.
- Weston Hazel Lewis. For services to the community in Saint Vincent.
- Liu Lit-mo. For voluntary public services in Hong Kong.
- David Sylvanus Lloyd. For voluntary public services in Saint Christopher-Nevis-Anguilla.
- Shree Dhar Maharaj. For voluntary public and social services in Fiji.
- Albert Selwyn Marshall, Grade 10 Officer, British High Commission, Kingston.
- John Robert Neil Marshall, Senior Tutor in Charge of Department of Local Government, Northern States of Nigeria.
- Ivan Heywood May, lately First Secretary (Information), Her Majesty's Embassy, Bonn.
- William Henry Moore, Superintendent of Works, Saint Helena.
- Douglas Henry Mott, MM, Acting Chief Superintendent of Police, Nigeria.
- Olga Theresa Pamphile, Assistant Accountant General, Saint Lucia.
- Pang Fu-wah. For voluntary public services in Hong Kong.
- John Eustathiou Papadakis, British subject resident in Greece.
- Elizabeth Helen Purdie Paterson, Senior Matron, Northern States of Nigeria.
- Elizabeth Hilda Persson, Assistant Administration Officer, Her Majesty's Embassy, Copenhagen.
- Miriam Violet Prechner, lately Personal Assistant to Her Majesty's Ambassador, Ankara.
- Gertrude Isobel Protain, Executive Secretary, Tourist Board, Grenada.
- Derek Alfred Chalmers Purser, Inspector of Mines, Geological Survey and Mines Department, Swaziland.
- Josua Raitilava Rabukawaqa, Administrative Officer Class IIB, Fiji. For services to the community.
- Alice Dale Rathbone, Accountant, Her Majesty's Consulate-General, Durban.
- Jean Clark Reid. United Kingdom citizen, lately resident in Pakistan.
- Walter Lewis Reid, Honorary British Vice-Consul, Orotava, Tenerife.
- Taliesin Morgan Richards, lately Secretary, Teaching Service, Botswana.
- Eugene Julius Robinson, Superintendent, Belize Electricity Board, British Honduras.
- Gustave Clement Charles Savy De St. Maurice, Assistant Financial Secretary, Seychelles.
- Rupert John Scott, Senior Technical Officer (Mechanical), Western State of Nigeria.
- Thomas Shields, lately Senior Technical Officer, Western State of Nigeria.
- Stella Marianne Elizabeth Shute, lately Matron, St. Francis Hospital and Dispensary, Panvel, Maharashtra, India.
- Noeleen Margaret Smyth, Nursing Sister, Office of the British Chargé d'Affaires, Peking.
- William Noel Stevens, Administrative Secretary of Wusasa C.M.S. Hospital, Nigeria.
- Leonard John Sutton, lately Superintendent of Police and Deputy Head of Special Branch, Aden.
- Timeaus Teioli, Higher Executive Officer, Malaita District, British Solomon Islands Protectorate.
- William Laidler Young Tollett, lately British Vice-Consul, Her Majesty's Consulate-General, Casablanca.
- Lewisa Urquhart, Home Science Supervisor, Education Headquarters, Sabah.
- Lionel Vallis, British Vice-Consul, Her Majesty's Consulate-General, Bilbao.
- James Mackay Walker, lately Executive Officer, Federation of Uganda Employers, Uganda.
- Henry James Wilson, Labour Officer, Ministry of Labour and Commerce, Bahama Islands.
- Wilfred Wilson, Manager (United Kingdom Colombo Plan Adviser) of the Nepalese Government Press, Katmandu.
- William Richard Eric Woodfin, British Vice-Consul (Administration), Her Majesty's Consulate-General, Genoa.
- Patricia Young, lately Headmistress of the British Overseas School, Karachi, Pakistan.

State of New South Wales

- Horace Barnes Brownlow, President, Abercrombie Shire Council.
- Arthur Albert Frizelle. For services to the community.
- Peter Helliar. For services to ex-servicemen.
- Phyllis Eileen Jackson. For services to the community.
- Vera Alice Jobson. For services to the community, particularly to the Red Cross Society.
- Thomas Michael McGrath. For services to the community, particularly to primary producers.
- Eric Arthur Mobbs. For services to the community, particularly to local government.
- John Morison. For services to sport, particularly swimming.
- Leonard Maxwell Ridd. For services to primary industries.
- Richard Gordon Thew. For services to music.
- Beatrice Thomson. For services to the community.
- Joyce Ethel Whitworth. For services to the community.
- Ena Hilda Stuart-Wright. For services to ex-servicemen.
- William John Robert Young. For services to amateur sport, particularly cycling.

State of Victoria

- Roderick Charles Barton, of Gundowring. For services to local government, particularly the fire service.
- Sidney Colin Diffey, MC, ED, of Springhurst. For services to local government, particularly the fire service.
- Elva Winifred Hurrell. Lately in charge of Departmental Typing Pool, Premier's Department.
- George Lay, of Swan Hill. For services to the community, particularly local government.
- John Alan McKie, of Hawthorn East. For services to the community.
- Clarence Walter Pedersen, JP, of Warragul. For services to the community.
- Maurice Ress, of Melbourne. For services to the community, particularly local government.
- Edwin James Semmens, of Creswick. For services to the community, particularly to local government.
- Grace Allison Shipston, JP, of Cheltenham. For services to the community.
- George Thornton Upton, President of the Shire of Diamond Valley.

State of Queensland

- James Bain. For philanthropic services.
- Evelyn Muriel Crimson. For charitable and welfare services to the community.
- The Venerable Archdeacon William Hoog. For services to the community, particularly connected with the Church.
- Allan Andrew Knudson. For services to the community, particularly in the field of ambulance work.
- Henry George Lamond. For services to Australian literature.
- Christian Ludvig Petersen. For services to the dairying industry and community affairs.
- Cornelius Lillian Rynne, Matron, Aboriginal Hospital, Cherbourg.
- Charles William Siller. For services in the field of oil exploration.

State of South Australia

- Alderman Allan William George Davey, JP. For services to the community and local government.
- Flora Stella George (Sister Dora). For welfare services to the community, particularly to the sick, poor and aged.

State of Western Australia

- Irma Gurr Barrett. For services to the community, particularly to the Country Women's Association.
- Cecil Francis Glad Wingrove. For services to the community.
- Rolf Harris, Entertainer.
- Frank Henry Jolliffe, JP. For services to the dairy industry.
- Margaret Mary Monteath, For services to the community.

State of Tasmania

- William Jack Harrison. For services to amateur swimming.
- Lynda Agnes Victoria Heaven. For services to the community.
- George Ernest Rees. For services to local government.

=== Order of the Companions of Honour (CH) ===
- The Right Honourable Patrick Chrestien Gordon Walker, MP, Member of Parliament for Smethwick 1945–1964 and for Leyton since 1966. Parliamentary Under-secretary of State, Commonwealth Relations Office 1947–1950, Secretary of State for Commonwealth Relations 1950–1951. Secretary of State for Foreign Affairs October 1964—January 1965. Minister Without Portfolio 1967. Secretary of State for Education and Science 1967–1968.

=== Companion of the Imperial Service Order (ISO) ===
Home Civil Service

- James Allan, Accountant of Court, Court of Session, Scotland.
- Francis Anthony, Senior Chief Executive Officer, Ministry of Defence.
- George Edwin Barber, Senior Inspector of Taxes, Board of Inland Revenue.
- Raymond Beswick, Deputy Inspector General of Waterguard, Board of Customs and Excise.
- Cecil William Brooks, chief executive officer, Ministry of Agriculture, Fisheries and Food. For services during the recent Foot-and-Mouth disease epidemic.
- Robert Ian Collison, Assistant Chief Inspector, Immigration Branch, Home Office.
- Alfred George Craner, chief executive officer, National Savings Committee.
- Robert Henry Dow, Superintending Quantity Surveyor, Southern Region, Ministry of Public Building and Works.
- William Arthur Evans, TD, Senior Chief Executive Officer, County Courts Branch, Lord Chancellor's Department.
- John George Noel Gaskin, Senior Principal Scientific Officer, Laboratory of the Government Chemist, Ministry of Technology.
- Wilson Hartley, lately Constructor, Ministry of Defence.
- Eva Annie Hutchinson, chief executive officer, Ministry of Health.
- Frederick Ronald Kisby, Director (Supplementary Benefits) and Deputy Regional Controller, Ministry of Social Security.
- Arthur George Miller, Senior Chief Executive Officer, Ministry of Defence.
- Norman Clifford Norfolk, chief executive officer, Paymaster General's Office.
- Sylvia Francis Lewis Penn, Grade 2 Officer, Department of Employment and Productivity.
- Alfred Arthur Charles Soper, Executive Registrar, Registry of Friendly Societies.
- Harold McMaster Taggart, Chief Engineer, Ministry of Finance for Northern Ireland.
- Herbert Todkill, Planning Controller, Headquarters Midland Telecommunications Region, General Post Office.
- Gerard Majella Walsh, Head Postmaster, Cardiff, General Post Office.
- Arthur James Wright, Principal Inspector of Taxes, Board of Inland Revenue.

Diplomatic Service and Overseas List

- Chung Wing-kwong, MBE, Superintendent of Urban Services, Hong Kong.
- Chung Yiu-kei, Controller, Public Enquiry Service, Hong Kong.

State of New South Wales

- John Thomas Monaghan, lately Under-secretary, Department of Local Government.

State of Victoria

- John Archibald Robertson, JP, lately Clerk of the Parliaments.

State of Queensland

- John Allan Sewell, Under Treasurer and Under-Secretary, Treasury Department.

=== British Empire Medal (BEM) ===
Military Division

Royal Navy

- Chief Radio Electrician Richard Baker, P/MX 804804.
- Chief Engineroom Artificer William John Basil Bowyer, P/MX 803657.
- Chief Petty Officer Edward Henry Bradley, D/JX 142778.
- Chief Airman Reginald Alphonso Brokenshire, L/FX 879643.
- Chief Ordnance Electrical Artificer William James Cheeseman, P/MX 60693.
- Chief Airman William George Clark, L/FX 646199.
- Quartermaster Sergeant Robert Joseph Coward, Royal Marines, PO/X 5982.
- Chief Petty Officer, Stores Assistant (V) Frederick Ernest Verdun Cumbers, D/MX 81665.
- Quartermaster Sergeant Matthew Noel Edmond, Royal Marines, Ply/X 5509.
- Chief Engineer Mechanic Derek Finch, D/KX 898133.
- Chief Radio Supervisor Victor Jack Funnell, P/JX 157333.
- Chief Mechanician Daniel John Greaney, P/K 934790.
- Chief Petty Officer (Royal Naval Reserve), Harry George Holmes, Q991121.
- Chief Mechanician Albert Charles Howlett, P/KX 771310.
- Chief Radio Supervisor Donald Owen Jones, P/JX 246125.
- Chief Petty Officer John Terence Kenny, P/JX 156600.
- Chief Radio Electrician Charles Richard Lowe, D/MX 852836.
- Sergeant Maurice Pearson, Royal Marines, RM.14898.
- Chief Petty Officer, RP1, Ivan Charles Pike, D/JX 712893.
- Chief Engineroom Artificer Frank Stanley Polly, P/MX 842959.
- Master at Arms Wilfred James Reynolds, D/MX 712373.
- Chief Radio Electrician Edward Urry, P/MX 885910.
- Petty Officer Steward Tiago Viegas, G/LX 637954.
- Chief Ordnance Electrical Artificer Fred Walker, P/MX 583962.
- Chief Petty Officer (Coxswain) Harry Winter, P/JX 161054.
- Chief Petty Officer, Clearance Diver 1, William Charles Witherell, P/JX 843329.
- Chief Air Fitter Frederick Wray, L/FX 77631.
- Chief Wren Quarters Assistant Elizabeth Jack Young, 19461.

Army

- 14467120 Staff Sergeant Howard Ball, The Parachute Regiment.
- 23349525 Staff Sergeant Ronald William Berridge, Royal Army Ordnance Corps.
- 23218976 Staff Sergeant (acting) Derrick Ely, Corps of Royal Electrical and Mechanical Engineers.
- 22786719 Staff Sergeant Michael Graham Browning, Corps of Royal Engineers.
- 21015115 Staff Sergeant Harry Puckrin Burn, Royal Army Pay Corps, Territorial and Army Volunteer Reserve.
- 22837782 Staff Sergeant John Graham Cape, The Prince of Wales's Own Regiment of Yorkshire.
- 2547522 Sergeant Kenneth Copeland, Royal Regiment of Artillery.
- 22536232 Staff Sergeant Harry James Cussell, Royal Regiment of Artillery.
- 23729313 Sergeant John Joseph Dunn, Royal Army Ordnance Corps.
- 23420634 Staff Sergeant John Barry Dure, Corps of Royal Engineers.
- 22562123 Warrant Officer Class II (acting) John Elliott, Corps of Royal Engineers.
- 14476711 Sergeant Leonard Finch, Royal Regiment of Artillery.
- W/71927 Warrant Officer Class II (acting) Molly Mary McArthur Fuller, Women's Royal Army Corps.
- 24117974 Staff Sergeant Kenneth Osborn Furner, The Manchester Regiment (Ardwick and Ashton) Territorials, Territorial and Army Volunteer Reserve.
- 23658170 Sergeant (acting) Malcolm Gibbs, 3rd Caribiniers (Prince of Wales's Dragoon Guards).
- 22999357 Staff Sergeant Garry John Graves, Royal Army Ordnance Corps.
- 5831 Staff Sergeant Joseph Grech, Royal Corps of Signals.
- 14451279 Staff Sergeant Eric Hoare, The Lancashire Regiment (Princes of Wales's Volunteers).
- 14052653 Sergeant Gordon Thomas Howse, Royal Corps of Signals.
- 19040992 Staff Sergeant Cyril Lancaster, Corps of Royal Military Police.
- 14467216 Staff Sergeant (acting) Jeffrey Charles Leat, The Queen's Regiment.
- 21005072 Staff Sergeant Joseph Lee, Royal Corps of Signals.
- 22526147 Staff Sergeant Ronald Arthur O'Hara, Royal Army Ordnance Corps.
- 2726306 Staff Sergeant Daniel Francis O'Keefe, Irish Guards.
- 23745951 Staff Sergeant (acting) Colin Robinson, Royal Army Ordnance Corps.
- 2695399 Sergeant Kenneth Gordon Roe, Scots Guards.
- 19072272 Staff Sergeant (acting) Walter Royle, Royal Regiment of Artillery.
- 21138692 Sergeant Saharsing Limbu, 7th Duke of Edinburgh's Own Gurkha Rifles.
- 22892988 Staff Sergeant Robert MacDonald Slater, Special Air Service Regiment.
- LS/4450117 Staff Sergeant (acting) William Smith, Royal Corps of Signals.
- 23892771 Corporal Talaiyasi Labalaba, Royal Ulster Rifles, serving with Special Air Service Regiment.
- 23653724 Corporal William Owen Wheeldon, The Sherwood Foresters (Nottinghamshire and Derbyshire Regiment), Territorial and Army Volunteer Reserve.
- 22288063 Sergeant David Wright, Corps of Royal Electrical and Mechanical Engineers.

Overseas Award

- Warrant Officer Class II Ho Koon-Man, Hong Kong Regiment.

Bar to the British Empire Medal

- 23242020 Warrant Officer Class II (acting) Robert Bruce Christison, BEM, Corps of Royal Engineers.

Royal Air Force

- E2450299 Flight Sergeant Colin Ainsworth.
- H1351531 Flight Sergeant Robert Beaton, RAF Regiment.
- N1705340 Flight Sergeant Joseph Frederick Bridge.
- A3500104 Flight Sergeant Bernard Embury Clapton.
- K4022371 Flight Sergeant John Cooper.
- H1547621 Flight Sergeant Lawrence George Eastman.
- A0651412 Flight Sergeant (now Warrant Officer) John Manning Enderby.
- K2266S81 Flight Sergeant Hugh Higgins Ferguson.
- X4136995 Flight Sergeant Gordon Fox.
- T1291299 Flight Sergeant Sidney John George Garnett.
- G3100420 Flight Sergeant Roy Frederick Harding.
- Y0574418 Flight Sergeant Leslie Frederick James, for services with the British Joint Services Training Team, Ghana.
- Q4020527 Flight Sergeant Anthony James Sayers.
- S3514071 Flight Sergeant Godfrey Dennis McDonald-Turney, RAF Regiment.
- U1852783 Flight Sergeant Roy Warwick.
- G4059247 Flight Sergeant Kenneth Whitehouse.
- M0627499 Flight Sergeant Raymond Williams.
- D4026711 Acting Flight Sergeant John Thomas Hubert Wilson.
- P4005361 Acting Flight Sergeant John Wright.
- B0644432 Chief Technician Kenneth Cushing.
- C1388260 Chief Technician Leon Albert Leclercq.
- V0579917 Chief Technician Gilbert Arnold Foxlow Salt.
- A0631140 Chief Technician Melbourne Griffiths Williams.
- 795905 Sergeant John Alexander Lawrence Caruana.
- M2301642 Sergeant Peter John Desborough.
- B3104099 Sergeant Robert Faulkner.
- S0589140 Sergeant James Barrie Guildford.
- J4114864 Sergeant Roy House.
- Y2422064 Sergeant Leonard Laurence Magee.
- D4008254 Sergeant Matthew Anthony Schwarz.
- M0587296 Sergeant Robert John Stephen.
- Y2426758 Sergeant George Stobbs.
- R3519420 Acting Sergeant James Peter Clark.
- R4198911 Acting Sergeant Charles Henry Younghusband, RAF Regiment.
- H4254677 Corporal Arthur Charles Wilson.
- B4260388 Corporal William Wood.

Civil Division

United Kingdom

- Arthur Abbott, Chargehand Driver (Operations), Ministry of Public Building and Works.
- David Allen, Caretaker, Territorial Army Centre, Blackburn.
- Barbara Anderson, Honorary Collector, Street Savings Group, Burgh of Lerwick.
- Charles Anderson, Chargehand Grade I (Masonry), Ministry of Public Building and Works.
- George Joseph Edward Ashton, Sub-Office Assistant, Greystoke Post Office, Penrith, Cumberland.
- John Athey, Supervisor and Inspection Engineer, Blackett Charlton Ltd. For services to Export.
- William Avery, Chief Inspector, Northumberland Constabulary.
- George Bailey, Chargehand, Hams Hall "B" Power Station, Midlands Region, Central Electricity Generating Board.
- Hilda Mary Bailey, Centre Organiser, Portslade-by-Sea Urban District, Sussex, Women's Royal Voluntary Service.
- Margaret Adair Bain, Senior Chief Supervisor, Telephone House, Glasgow.
- James Barnes, Coast Preventive Man, Board of Customs and Excise.
- William Joseph Barnes, Senior Foreman Class I, West India Dock, Port of London Authority.
- John Thomas Barratt, Transport Driver, Leicester Power Station, Midlands Region, Central Electricity Generating Board.
- Joyce Clarice Bateman, Senior Technical Assistant, Ministry of Agriculture, Fisheries and Food. For services during the recent Foot-and-Mouth disease epidemic.
- George William Bennett, Head Cook, Royal Air Force College, Cranwell.
- Renee Margaret Best, Centre Organiser, Easthampstead, Berkshire, Women's Royal Voluntary Service.
- Bertram Claude Settles, Mechanical Foreman, Southall Gas Works, North Thames Gas Board.
- John Henry Wilson Black, Inspector, City of Glasgow Police.
- James Blades, JP, Gas Plant Attendant, Colvilles Ltd., Gartcosh Heat Works, Gartcosh, Lanarkshire.
- Bertram Frank Bollen, Technical Officer, Rural Industries Bureau.
- James Arthur Botfield, Resident Caretaker, Stoke South District, North Staffordshire Area, Midlands Electricity Board.
- Ernest Bowles, Retort House Top Man, Windsor Street Works, Birmingham, West Midlands Gas Board.
- Harold James Bramwell, Traffic Foreman, Tate and Lyle Ltd., Liverpool.
- Arthur Edmond Brazel, Land Service Assistant III, Ministry of Agriculture, Fisheries and Food. For services during the recent Foot-and-Mouth disease epidemic.
- Isabella Brindley, Borstal Matron, Polmont Institution, Falkirk.
- Frederick William Britton, Bath House Attendant, Richard Thomas and Baldwins Ltd.
- Stanley Herbert Brodrick, Inspector, Tele-phone Manager's Office, East Area.
- Elizabeth Violet Brown, Attendant, Lord Chancellor's Department.
- John Alexander Buchanan, Chargehand Caulker, Cammell Laird & Company (Shipbuilders & Engineers) Ltd., Birkenhead.
- Frederick Arthur Bushnell, Foreman Ship-wright, Vosper Ltd., Portsmouth.
- Angus Macdonald Campbell, Lately Boat-man, Loch Torridon, Wester Ross.
- Charles Lucas Carrington, Senior Store-man, Explosives Research & Development Establishment, Waltham Abbey, Essex, Min-istry of Technology.
- William George Castle, Head Storekeeper, British Broadcasting Corporation.
- William Robert Clark, District Linesman, Aberdeen Area, North of Scotland Hydro-Electric Board.
- Henry Arthur Clarke. For services to the National Hospital Service Reserve in Wales.
- Arthur Cleary, Higher Grade Surveyor, Ordnance Survey, Ministry of Housing and Local Government.
- William Coleman, Non-Technical Class Grade I, Range Foreman, Foulness, United Kingdom Atomic Energy Authority.
- William Collard, Patrolman, Automobile Association.
- Isobel Cookson, Manageress, Red Rose Club, Weeton Camp, Navy, Army and Air Force Institutes.
- George Henry Cooper, Abattoir Manager & Slaughterman, Messrs. Boons Animal By-Products and Chemicals Ltd. For services during the recent Foot-and-Mouth disease epidemic.
- John Etherington Cooper, Carpenter and Joiner Instructor, Finchale Abbey Residential Training Centre for the Disabled, Durham.
- Muriel Cossens, Canteen Worker, Ipswich Sea Cadet Unit.
- Alfred Herbert Cotton, Inspector, Hayes Sub Post Office, Middlesex.
- Ralph Coxon, Maintenance Fitter, Venture Transport Ltd., Consett.
- William Frank Cozens, Station Officer, Surrey Fire Brigade.
- Frances Leonard Crook, Chargehand Instru-ment Maker, Metropolitan Police.
- John Edward Davies, Colliery First Aid Attendant, Penallta Colliery, East Wales Area, National Coal Board.
- William Henry Denton, Bosun, MV Ikeja Palm, General Service Contracts.
- Reginald Charles Derriman, Head Office Keeper, House of Commons.
- Roy Sydney Thomas Dowley, Chief House Engineer, Royal Commonwealth Society.
- William Charles Draper, Substation Attendant, Kettering District, East Midlands Electricity Board.
- William Alexander Dunlop, Head Foreman Loftsman, Harland and Wolff Ltd., Belfast.
- Eleanor Dunning, Honorary Collector, Street Savings Groups, Ripon.
- Sidney Herbert Edwards, Station Inspector, Sevenoaks, Southern Region, British Railways Board.
- Sidney Osmond Elliott, Lately Observer, Royal Observer Corps.
- Harrow Hansen Ellis, Works Technical Grade III, Ministry of Public Building and Works.
- Walter Ellis, School Crossing Patrolman, Metropolitan Police.
- Herbert Arnold George Eydmann, First Class Engineer, Ministry' of Public Building and Works.
- Bertie Fenwick, Lately Carpenter, MV Port Huon, Port Line Ltd.
- Thomas William Brenden Field, Public Room Steward, SS Oronsay, P. & O. Steam Navigation Company.
- John Findlay, Hospital Chief Officer I, HM Prison, Grendon.
- Henry John Fitall, Chief Storekeeper, Royal Naval Medical School, Alverstoke.
- John Leslie Martin Frolick, Chief Paper-keeper, Home Office.
- Edward Fullerton, Foreman Gardener, Stormont Estate, Northern Ireland.
- Norman Galbraith, Sergeant, Royal Ulster Constabulary.
- Stanley George, Gascoine, Welfare Assistant, King's Cross, British Railways Board.
- Sydney Watling Gibson, Museum Warder Grade VII, Department of Employment and Productivity.
- Dick Ginn, District Permanent Way Inspector, Chief Civil Engineer's Department, London Midland Region, British Railways Board.
- Barbara E. Godden, Honorary Collector, Street Savings Group, Cheshunt.
- Henry Goodman, Head Porter, Lewisham Hospital, London.
- Walter Charles Luke Gorton, Assistant Supervisor, Telegraphs, Head Post Office, Brighton.
- Charles Frederick Gould, Senior Checker, Nine Elms, South Region, British Railways Board.
- Marjorie Annie Griffin, Warden, Elizabeth Fry House, Reading.
- Douglas Gunn, Lately Chargehand, Ravensbourne District, London Electricity Board.
- John William Gunn, Police Inspector, Capenhurst Works, United Kingdom Atomic Energy Authority.
- Lilian Victoria Hall, Woman Inspector, Salford City Police.
- Wilham John Senior Hammond, Chief Flying Instructor and Deputy Commanding Officer, No. 617 Gliding School, Air Training Corps, Hendon.
- Miki Hansford, Detachment Commandant, Birmingham Branch, British Red Cross Society.
- John Harcus, Auxiliary Coastguard in Charge, Deerness, Orkney.
- Alfred Harper, Assistant House Foreman, Manchester, British Broadcasting Corporation.
- Robert Dugdale Harrison, Chief Inspector, Lancashire Constabulary.
- Henry Sidney Harvey, Messenger-Porter, Electricity Council.
- Madeleine Claire Hellmund, Honorary Collector, Street Savings Group, Sidcup.
- Joseph Steven Heskey, Excavator Driver, C. J. Pearce & Company Ltd. For services during the recent Foot-and-Mouth disease epidemic.
- Francis Charles Heywood, Training Officer, Manchester City Transport School for Drivers and Conductors.
- Ernest Harry Holden, Foreman bf Woodwork Shop, Science Museum.
- Reuben Alexander Hood, Senior Storekeeper, Richard Thomas & Baldwins Ltd., Spencer Works, Port Talbot, South Wales Group, British Steel Corporation.
- Lilian Hornby, Supervisor, Mechanical Accounts Department, Vickers Ltd. (Engineering Group), Barrow.
- Harold Frank Horner, Station Officer, Durham Fire Brigade.
- William Frederick Hudd, Deputy Head Attendant, Tate Gallery.
- James William Ives, Sergeant-Major, Royal Hospital, Chelsea.
- James Leonard Jackson, Assistant Inspector, Head Post Office, Lichfield.
- Robert James Jeanes, Engine Room Leading Hand, SS Andes, Royal Mail Lines Ltd.
- Ivor Llewelyn Jones, Honorary Collector for various charities in Cardiff.
- Owen John Kay, Detective Chief Inspector, Metropolitan Police.
- Ernest William Kempton, Storekeeper, British Waterways Board.
- John William Kerr, First Class Gasfitter, Stanley Depot, Northern Gas Board.
- Frederick Kimmance, Voluntary Hospital Worker, Nunnery Fields Hospital, Canterbury.
- Lambros Lambrianos, Storekeeper I, Ordnance Depot, Cyprus, Ministry of Defence.
- John Humphrey Langton, Craftsman I, Aeronautical Inspection Directorate Laboratories, Harefield, Ministry of Technology.
- William John Lauder, Industrial Labourer, HM S. Drake, Devonport.
- Thomas Lee, Forgeman, Firth Brown Ltd.
- John Stewart William Thomas Llewellyn, Research and Development Craftsman Special, National Gas Turbine Establishment, Pyestock, Farnborough, Ministry of Technology.
- Frederick McAllister, Leading Hand in Fitting Department, L.S.E. Ltd., Manchester.
- Thomas McCullough, Sub-District Commandant, Ulster Special Constabulary.
- Michael McGinty, JP, Washery Maintenance Fitter, Merthyr Vale Colliery, East Wales Area, National Coal Board.
- Norman Maclean, Sub-Postmaster, Scarp, Isle of Harris.
- John Robert Main, Experimental Worker III, Safety in Mines Research Establishment Division, Ministry of Power.
- Lily Rosina Markey, Controlling Supervisor of Cleaners, Home Office.
- Wilfred Henry Martin, Senior Attendant, Department of the Serjeant-at-Arms, House of Lords.
- George Matuska, Receptionist, British Embassy, Budapest.
- Thomas Metcalfe, Section Leader, Submarine Engineering Drawing Office, Vickers Ltd. (Shipbuilding Group), Barrow.
- Adrian Peter Mieras, Lately Chief Warden, Edinburgh Division, Civil Defence Corps.
- Edna Millhouse, Senior National Accounting Machine Operator, Rolls-Royce Ltd., Derby.
- Alfred Oliver Miller, Telephone Attendant, H.Q. Plymouth Group, Royal Marines.
- Kathleen Mary Miller, Lately Senior Staff Officer (Welfare), Leicester County Borough Division, Civil Defence Corps.
- Frank Brooke Morris, Building Foreman, Plant Engineers Department, Mirrlees National Ltd., Stockport.
- Ethel Edith Emily Munday, Cleaner, Ministry of Social Security.
- Joseph Muscat, Foreman of Storehouses, HM Naval Base, Malta.
- Robert Naylor, Sub-Officer, Oxfordshire Fire Brigade.
- Leonard George Needham, Process Supervisor II, Reactor Development Laboratory, Wmdscale, United Kingdom Atomic Energy Authority.
- John Newton, Civilian Instructor, No. 367 (South Sheffield) Squadron, Air Training Corps.
- Hilda Nursey, Centre Organiser, Bungay Urban District, Suffolk, Women's Royal Voluntary Service.
- Wilfred George Orchard, Assistant Foreman, Paints Division, I.C.I. Ltd.
- Edgar Louis Orrow, Works Superintendent (Rivers), Department of Public Health Engineering, Greater London Council.
- Charles William Palmer, Research & Development Craftsman, Grade I (Instrument Maker), Chemical Defence Experimental Establishment, Ministry of Defence.
- Michael Paris, Process and General Supervisory III, Foreign Office.
- Charles Gratton Passmore, Senior Export Packer, O.P. Chocolate Specialities (Manufacturers) Ltd. For services to Export.
- John Paton, Temporary Calf Certifying Officer, Grade III, Ministry of Agriculture, Fisheries and Food. For services during the recent Foot-and-Mouth disease epidemic.
- Hugh Patterson, Pharmacy Storekeeper, Royal Victoria Hospital, Belfast.
- Ernest Joseph Peachey, Chargehand Labourer, Central Flying School, Little Rissington, Ministry of Defence.
- Albert Victor Pedler, Driver, United Kingdom Region, Commonwealth War Graves Commission.
- Thomas George Penny, Chargehand-Driver, Southern Gas Board.
- Annie May Pocock, Honorary Collector, Village Savings Group, Wootton Bridge.
- Harold John Powell, Lately Member of Warden Section, Newport (Monmouth) Division, Civil Defence Corps.
- Thomas Allen Preece, Deputy Chief Warder, Victoria & Albert Museum.
- Harry Preston, Superintendent of hand-blown and hand-pressed glassware, James A. Jobling & Company Ltd.
- Walter Prior, Chief Warder, Institute of Geological Sciences.
- Clarence Smeating Pyne, Engine Room Store-keeper, SS S. A. Vaal, British and Commonwealth Shipping Company Ltd.
- Henrietta Quin, Honorary Group Secretary, Street Savings Group, Armagh.
- Frederick Robert Revell, Overseer, Head Post Office, Dover, Kent.
- George Robertson, Chief Observer, Royal Observer Corps.
- John Frederick Edward Robins, Blacksmith, Joseph Ash & Son Ltd., Birmingham.
- Leonard Alexander Robinson, Sub-Officer (Auxiliary Fire Service), Surrey Fire Brigade.
- William Cecil Robinson, Senior Scientific Assistant, National Physical Laboratory, Ministry of Technology.
- Christian Rottgardt, Warehouse Chargehand, Government Wool Disinfecting Station, Department of Employment and Productivity.
- Alfred Cecil Russell, School Staff Instructor, Worcester Royal Grammar School Combined Cadet Force.
- John Wood Sales, Coxswain, Lerwick Life-Boat.
- Eliza Sanders, Honorary Collector, Street Savings Group, Chester.
- Joseph Alejandro Santos, Local Fuelling Assistant, HM Dockyard, Gibraltar.
- William Henry Schafer, Instructional Officer Grade III, Department of Employment and Productivity.
- William Scoon, Parliament House Messenger, Edinburgh.
- William Henry Sharpe, Lately Member of Class A, Eastbourne Division, Civil Defence Corps.
- John Shaw, Plant Repair Chargehand, Lostock Hall Works, North Western Gas Board.
- Herbert Edward Shelbourn, Locomotive Driver, Lincoln, Eastern Region, British Railways Board.
- Leonard Jack Shone, Works Superintendent, Prestcold Ltd. For services to Export.
- Pasquale Sinacola, Supervisor of Office Services, British Council, Rome.
- George Sloan, Foundry Moulder, Distington Engineering Company Ltd., Workington, Cumberland, Midland Group, British Steel Corporation.
- Margaret Nina Smith, Refectory Manageress, Bolton Institute of Technology and Technical College.
- Marjorie Smith, Commandant, 98 Detachment, Didsbury, East Lancashire Branch, British Red Cross Society.
- Ronald Frederick Smith, Bosun, MV Ruahine, New Zealand Shipping Company Ltd.
- Sadie Smith, Leader, Old People's Club, Allen's Cross, Northumberland.
- Walter Douglas Smith, Stores Superintendent, Ministry of Defence.
- Stanley Robert Charles Squires, Machine Tool Fitter, John Holroyd & Company Ltd.
- James C. Stanton, Ganger, George Wimpey & Company Ltd. For services during the recent Foot-and-Mouth disease epidemic.
- James R. Stark. For services with the St. Andrew's Ambulance Association, Broughty Ferry British Railways Section, Dundee.
- Ellen Stewart, Storewoman "A", Command Vehicle Park, Longkesh, Ministry of Defence.
- William Tyndall Stewart, Lately First Officer, Civil Defence Corps, Staffordshire Division.
- Wilfred Jack Stock, Lately Vehicle Examiner, Grade II, East Midland Traffic Area, Ministry of Transport.
- Henry Murray Peddie Stocks, Ganger, Tulliallan Region, Research Division, Forestry Commission.
- Gilbert Stone, Leader, St. Mark's Boys' Club, Erdington, Birmingham.
- Alfred Richard Summerhayes, Lately Senior Signal Officer, Southend-on-Sea Division, Civil Defence Corps.
- Frederick John Taylor, School Keeper, Shpreditch College for the Clothing Industry.
- Edward Thompson, Foreman, Remploy factory, Blackburn.
- Amy Ethel Townsend, Detachment Officer, West Yorks 352, West Yorkshire Branch, British Red Cross Society.
- William Arthur Trounce, Senior Instructor, Apprentice School, Holman Brothers Ltd., Camborne, Cornwall.
- George Turner, Leading hand, Quartz Arcs Department, Thermal Syndicate Ltd.
- Henry James Upton, Honorary Collector, Social Savings Group (Scouts), Brent, London.
- Edward Frank Voller, Acting Storehouseman, HM Dockyard, Portsmouth.
- Albert Sidney Waite, Foreman, Desford Brickworks, National Coal Board Brickworks Executive, Leicestershire Group.
- Eric Norman Walker, Bomb Disposal Officer, Jersey, Channel Islands.
- David John Thomas Warlow, Foreman, P. Leiner & Sons (Wales) Ltd. For services to Export.
- Percy Albert Warn, Senior Scientific Assistant, Meteorological Office.
- William Albert Warner, Lately Bosun, SS Amsterdam, Eastern Region, British Railways Board.
- Edwin Crossley Watson, Motor Vehicle Driver, Brook Motors Ltd., Huddersfield. For services to Export.
- Charles Ernest Weatherhogg, Honorary Collector, Industrial Savings Group, Ballard & Company, Tipton.
- Roy Wheston, Area Foreman, Essex County Council.
- Ernest George White, Craftsman Bodymaker, London Transport Board.
- Paul White, Head Chef, Fortnum & Mason. For services to Government Hospitality.
- Maurice Hedworth Williams, Leader, West Tarring Boys' Club, Worthing.
- William David Williams, Foreman, Mechanical Assembly, Air Weapons and Aircraft Equipment, Hawker Siddeley Dynamics Ltd.
- Edwin Woollin, Underground Salvage Worker, East Ardsley Colliery, North Yorkshire Area, National Coal Board.
- Walter Yarrow, Postman, Sorting Office Doncaster.
- Frederick Ernest Young, Dock Worker, Swansea, British Transport Docks Board.

State of New South Wales

- Marion Bennett. For welfare services to the community.
- Selma Green. For services to ex-servicemen.
- Winifred Amelia Mostyn Hurt. For services to the community.
- Susanna Phyllis McCullough. For services to the community.
- Mona Elizabeth Nichols. For services to the community.
- Frederick Arthur Tauchert. For services to the New South Wales Travel Bureau.
- Harold Ambrose Tolhurst. For services to amateur sport.
- Arthur Upjohn, Honorary Secretary, United Charities Fund.

State of Victoria

- Ronald Edward Blood, Captain, Upwey Rural Fire Brigade.
- John Henry Costar. For services with Corps of Commissionaires.
- William John Cox. For services to the Yarra Bend Park Trust.
- Colin James Henderson Drife, Lately Regional Secretary, Central Council Rural Fire Brigades Association.
- Percy Alan Gray, Deputy Chief Officer, Urban and Rural Fire Brigades.
- Alan Charles Hardy, DFC, Group Officer, Mansfield Rural Fire Brigade.
- William John Jones, Communications Officer, Moorooduc Rural Fire Brigade.
- Lois Kelly, Radio Operator, Upwey and Dandenong Ranges Fire Brigades Group.
- William Herbert Kyme, Member, State Service Concert Orchestra.
- Alexander William John McPhee, Tipstaff to Chief Justice.
- Andrew O'Brien, Curator of the Gardens at Government House, Melbourne.
- Raymond Stanley Parker, Captain, Ferntree Gully Urban Fire Brigade.
- Albert Edwin Purnell, Captain, Modewarre Rural Fire Brigade.
- Joseph Henry Parker Skelton, Member, State' Service Concert Orchestra.
- Bernard Francis Squires, Captain, Benalla Urban Fire Brigade.
- Joseph Henry Watford. For services with Corps of Commissionaires.
- Charles Henry Weidner, Secretary, Natimuk Rural Fire Brigade.
- Edgar Howard Zerbst, Captain, Brimpaen Rural Fire Brigade.

State of Western Australia

- Amana Clarke. For services to the community over many years.
- Roy Desmond Edinger, JP. For services to the community of Melville.
- William Ernest Freeman. For services to the welfare of the community.
- Joseph John Jackson. For services to charity and community organisations.
- Nell Shortland-Jones. For services to the community, particularly as an entertainer.
- Vivian George Malmgreen. For services to the community, particularly to youth.
- Oscar Frank Edward Stack. For services to the community, particularly as a hospital visitor.

Overseas Territories

- Chan Koon-wing, Foreman, Waterworks Office, Hong Kong.
- Francisco Xavier Da Silva, Clerk Class 1, Legal Department, Hong Kong.
- Mak Kai-cheong, Clerk, Port Control Unit, Hong Kong.
- Poon Hoi, Class 1 Chauffeur, Government House, Hong Kong.
- Wong Bor, Workshop Mechanic, Hong Kong Tramways Ltd.
- Basil Ebenezer Henderson, Welfare Officer, Central Housing and Planning Authority. For services to the community of St. Kitts.
- Myrtle Mercedes Woods. For voluntary social services in St. Kitts.
- James Athonasus Daniel Mason, Steward Government House, St. Lucia.

=== Royal Red Cross (RRC) ===
- Major Barbara Joy Rattee (329865), Queen Alexandra's Royal Army Nursing Corps.
- Squadron Officer Grace Haydock, ARRC, (405740), Princess Mary's Royal Air Force Nursing Service.

==== Associate of the Royal Red Cross (ARRC) ====
- Veronica Davison, Superintending Sister, Queen Alexandra's Royal Naval Nursing Service.
- Helen Burns Rollo, Head Naval Nurse, Queen Alexandra's Royal Naval Nursing Service.
- Major Gwendoline Mary Clarke (412518), Queen Alexandra's Royal Army Nursing Corps.
- Major Eileen Mary O'Brien (427348), Queen Alexandra's Royal Army Nursing Corps.
- Major Isabel Flora May Smith (415629), Queen Alexandra's Royal Army Nursing Corps.
- Squadron Officer Mary Brigid Walsh (406422), Princess Mary's Royal Air Force Nursing Service.

=== Air Force Cross (AFC) ===
Royal Navy

- Commander Nicholas Tom Bennett.
- Lieutenant Commander Brian Davies.

Army

- Major Peter Geoffrey Clement Child (397204), Army Air Corps.

Royal Air Force

- Wing Commander Peter David George Terry (203299).
- Wing Commander Keith Alec Williamson (582252).
- Acting Wing Commander Brian Anthony Ashley (4038871).
- Squadron Leader Kenneth Russell Hayward (619218).
- Squadron Leader Austin Sullivan (1568902).
- Squadron Leader Brian Edward Taylor (607434).
- Flight Lieutenant David Ernest Deadman (2505218).
- Flying Officer Sidney Lawrence Bottom (5200016).

=== Air Force Medal (AFM) ===
- 22797622 Staff Sergeant Peter William Sherman, Special Air Service Regiment.
- K2235532 Acting Flight Sergeant John William Allen, Royal Air Force.

=== Queen's Commendation for Valuable Service in the Air ===
Royal Navy

- Lieutenant Stephen Donne Lazenby.
- Lieutenant Commander Arthur Harold Milnes.
- Lieutenant Commander Richard Treherne Slatter.

Royal Air Force

- Wing Commander George Walter Fulcher Charles (607082).
- Wing Commander Derek Lyndhurst Eley (57643).
- Squadron Leader Andrew Nicholas Barlex (4043375).
- Squadron Leader Anthony James Chaplin (607687).
- Squadron Leader Kenneth John Dix, AFC, (4031323).
- Squadron Leader Paul Julius Hirst (4076366).
- Squadron Leader John Spear Sexton (3504487).
- Squadron Leader Iain Frederic Weston (607283).
- Flight Lieutenant Peter Francis Bates (3519244).
- Flight Lieutenant Derek Arthur Bell (2620033).
- Flight Lieutenant Roy Booth (3520837).
- Flight Lieutenant Benjamin Roy Bradley, AFM, (1590837).
- Flight Lieutenant Robert Henry Brighton (1869034).
- Flight Lieutenant John McKenzie Clayton (1823644).
- Flight Lieutenant Roy Sydney George Cozens (573225).
- Flight Lieutenant Peter Ernest Dell (2562317).
- Flight Lieutenant Peter Rhys Evans (607555).
- Flight Lieutenant David James Goy Foster (2591690).
- Flight Lieutenant Derek Allen Haworth (3130975).
- Flight Lieutenant John Neill Herbertson (607922).
- Flight Lieutenant Kenneth Colin Hodgson (579244).
- Flight Lieutenant John Edward Houghton (4230464).
- Flight Lieutenant Colin Maxwell Labouchere (609114).
- Flight Lieutenant Peter Basil Maillard (4078842).
- Flight Lieutenant Arthur George Sadler (4065539).
- Flight Lieutenant William John Wratten (608049).
- Master Engineer John Day (X0582142).

United Kingdom

- Ernest Derek Glaser, DFC, Senior Test Pilot (Hurn), British Aircraft Corporation (Operating) Ltd., Bournemouth (Hurn) Airport, Christchurch, Hampshire.
- James Alfred Jackson, Test Pilot, Rolls-Royce Ltd., Hucknall Aerodrome, Nottingham.

Overseas Territory

- Neil MacGregor Ganley, Chief Pilot, Fiji Airways Ltd.

=== Queen's Police Medal (QPM) ===
England and Wales

- John Andrew McKay, CBE, Her Majesty's Inspector of Constabulary.
- Robert Walton, Chief Constable, Kingston-upon-Hull City Police.
- Thomas Gwilym Morris, Chief Constable, Cardiff City Police.
- David Holdsworth, Deputy Chief Constable, Thames Valley Constabulary.
- Rex Henry Lorraine Jones, Regional Co-ordinator, No. 4 District Regional Crime Squad.
- Stanley Parr, Assistant Chief Constable, Lancashire Constabulary.
- Harold Roddon Squires, Chief Superintendent, Metropolitan Police.
- Donald Roy, Chief Superintendent, Cumbria Constabulary.
- Stuart Leonard Whiteley, Chief Superintendent, City of London Police—seconded as Staff Officer to Her Majesty's Chief Inspector of Constabulary.
- Thomas Barnes, Superintendent and Acting Chief Constable, South Shields Borough Police.
- Jasper Peter Vibart, Superintendent, Metropolitan Police.
- Donald Edward Thompson, lately Superintendent, Metropolitan Police.
- John Joseph Valentine MacDonald, Commandant, No. 5 Police District Training Centre, Eynsham Hall, Witney.
- Sidney James Wilson, Superintendent, Metropolitan Police.

Scotland

- William Albert Ratcliffe, Assistant Chief Constable, City of Glasgow Police.
- Andrew Charters, Superintendent, Ayr Burgh Police.

Northern Ireland

- James McKeown, Head Constable, Royal Ulster Constabulary.

State of New South Wales

- Owen Maher, Superintendent, 2nd Class, New South Wales Police Force.
- Milton Samuel Small, Detective Superintendent, 1st Class, New South Wales Police Force.
- Leonard Frank Newman, Superintendent, 2nd Class, New South Wales Police Force.
- William Frederick Jenkins, lately Superintendent, 3rd Class, New South Wales Police Force.
- John Healy, lately Superintendent, 3rd Class, New South Wales Police Force.

State of South Australia

- Rudolph Allan Schlein, Inspector, South Australian Police Force.
- Leonard Douglas Brown, Inspector, South Australian Police Force.
- Edwin Charles Hopkins, Inspector, South Australian Police Force.

Overseas Territories

- Joseph Ebenezer Byron, MVO, Superintendent and Head of Royal Antigua Police Force.

=== Queen's Fire Services Medal (QFSM) ===
England and Wales

- Leonard John Green, Divisional Officer, Grade I, London Fire Brigade.
- George Edwin McCoy, Chief Fire Officer, Leicester Fire Brigade.
- Norman Frank Richards, Chief Fire Officer, Bedfordshire Fire Brigade.
- Gerald Eastham, Chief Fire Officer, Worcester City and County Fire Brigade.

Scotland

- Peter Johnstone McGill, GM, Divisional Officer, Grade I, Glasgow Fire Brigade.

State of South Australia

- Elmor Franz Lehmann, Inspecting Officer, South Australian Fire Brigades Board Country Auxiliary Fire Service.

=== Colonial Police Medal (CPM) ===
Brunei

- Sydney Cecil David Dover, Deputy Superintendent, Royal Brunei Police Force.
- Zakariah bin Ibrahim, Assistant Superintendent, Royal Brunei Police Force.

Swaziland

- David Michael Hogan, Superintendent, Swaziland Police Force.

Overseas Territories and the former Colony of Aden

- Robert Saxton Le Mesurier Besant, Chief of Police, Cayman Islands.
- Robert James Bretherton, Superintendent (Acting Senior Superintendent), Hong Kong Police Force.
- Hector Joseph Carlyle, Superintendent (Acting Senior Superintendent), Hong Kong Police Force.
- Christopher Frank Carrington, lately Deputy Superintendent, Aden Police Force.
- Robert Armando Castro, Senior Divisional Officer, Hong Kong Auxiliary Fire Service.
- John Walter Devonshire, Senior Superintendent, Hong Kong Auxiliary Police Force.
- Fung Loi, Inspector, Hong Kong Police Force.
- James Horace Harris, Superintendent, Hong Kong Police Force.
- Ho Hing-chee, Senior Inspector, Hong Kong Police Force.
- Ho Tung-mow, Principal Fireman (Marine), Hong Kong Fire Services.
- Orasha Gomez Hodge, Sergeant, Royal Saint Christopher-Nevis-Anguilla Police Force.
- Hon Shum, Staff Sergeant Class II, Hong Kong Police Force.
- Hui Chun-keung, Senior Superintendent, Hong Kong Auxiliary Police Force.
- Li Hak-bun, Sergeant, Hong Kong Police Force.
- Frank Norman Martin, Superintendent-in-Charge, Saint Helena Constabulary.
- Walh Mohammed, Deputy Superintendent, Fiji Police Force.
- Ian Mathieson Morrison, Detective Inspector, Bermuda Police Force.
- Dudley Thomas Saint, Superintendent, Fiji Police Force.
- Charles Leonard Scobell, Senior Superintendent, Hong Kong Police Force.
- James Fraser Semple, lately Deputy Superintendent, Aden Police Force.
- John Joseph Sheehy, Detective Chief Inspector, Bermuda Police Force.
- Joel Emmanuel Stevens, Assistant Superintendent, Royal Antigua-Montserrat-Virgin Islands Police Force.
- Tang Ho, Principal Fireman (Marine), Hong Kong Fire Services.
- Tsui Kam, Sergeant, Hong Kong Police Force.
- Moulton Vincent Williams, Captain, Saint Vincent Auxiliary Police Force.
- Robert Wilson, Superintendent, Hong Kong Police Force.

== Australia ==
=== Knight Bachelor ===
- Kenneth Thomas Adamson, CMG, DDSc, FDSRCS, of Toorak, Victoria. For services to the Dental Profession and to the community.
- Major General Ivan Noel Dougherty, CBE, DSO, ED, of Cronulla, New South Wales. For services to ex-Servicemen and to the community.
- The Honourable Hubert Ferdinand Opperman, OBE, Australian High Commissioner, Malta.
- Colonel George Grafton Lees Stening, ED, MB, BS, of Sydney, New South Wales. Chief Executive Officer, Order of St. John of Jerusalem in Australia.
- Edgar Stephen Tanner, CBE, ED, of Elwood, Victoria. Honorary Secretary and Treasurer, Australian Olympic Federation.

=== Order of the Bath ===
==== Companion of the Order of the Bath (CB) ====
- Vice Admiral Victor Alfred Smith, CBE, DSC, Chief of Naval Staff.

=== Order of Saint Michael and Saint George ===
==== Knight Commander of the Order of St Michael and St George (KCMG) ====
- The Honourable George Francis Reuben Nicklin, MM, lately Premier of Queensland. For distinguished political services.

==== Companion of the Order of St Michael and St George (CMG) ====
- John Colquhoun Belisario, CBE, ED, MD, ChM, of Bellevue Hill, New South Wales. For services to medicine in the field of Dermatology.
- Professor David Plumley Derham, MBE, Vice-Chancellor of Melbourne University. For services to education.
- Ernest David Gardiner, CBE, of Williamstown, Victoria. For services to education.
- Professor Rutherford Ness Robertson, of Fitzroy, South Australia. For services to education and scientific research.

=== Order of the British Empire ===
==== Dame Commander of the Order of the British Empire (DBE) ====
Civil Division

- Zara Kate Holt, of Toorak, Victoria. For many years of distinguished devotion to public interests.
- Senator Dorothy Margaret Tangney, of Claremont, Western Australia. For services to Parliament and to community services.

==== Knight Commander of the Order of the British Empire (KBE) ====
Civil Division

- The Honourable Norman Henry Denham Henty, of Launceston, Tasmania. For political services.

==== Commander of the Order of the British Empire (CBE) ====
Military Division

- Rear Admiral Frederick William Purves, OBE, Royal Australian Navy.
- Major-General Colin Angus Ewen Fraser, MBE, (111), Australian Staff Corps.
- Acting Air Vice-Marshal Keith Selwyn Hennock, OBE, DFC, Royal Australian Air Force.

Civil Division

- Colin Basil Peter Bell, of Kenmore, Queensland. For services to the wool industry.
- Bede Bertrand Callaghan, of Gordon, New South Wales. Managing Director, Commonwealth Banking Corporation.
- Kay Chauncy Masterman. Former Association Professor of Classics, Australian National University. For services to education and literature.
- Roger Levinge Dean. Administrator of the Northern Territory.
- Stan Devenish Meares, MB, BS, of Lindfield, New South Wales. For services to medicine.
- James Rowland Odgers, Clerk of the Senate, Commonwealth Parliament.
- John Grant Phillips, Governor-Elect of the Reserve Bank of Australia.
- John Cecil Saint-Smith, of Townsville, Queensland. For services to mining, education and to the community.

==== Officer of the Order of the British Empire (OBE) ====
Military Division

Royal Australian Navy

- Captain Jeffrey William Herbert Britten.
- Senior Chaplain the Venerable Archdeacon, John Owen Were, (Emergency List).

Australian Military Forces

- Colonel Joseph David Honeysett (2182), Australian Staff Corps.
- Lieutenant-Colonel John Malcolm McNeill, ED, (358612), Royal Regiment of Australian Artillery.
- Colonel Kenneth Aston Peddle (2286), Australian Staff Corps.
- Lieutenant-Colonel William Joseph Slocombe (487), Australian Staff Corps.

Royal Australian Air Force

- Acting Air Commodore Harvey Holcombe Smith.
- Wing Commander Reginald Ernest Cormie (03246).
- Wing Officer Lois Katrine Pitman (L34413), Women's Royal Australian Air Force.

Civil Division

- Ian James Wynn Bisset, Assistant Secretary, Secondary Science Section, Department of Education and Science, Canberra.
- George Garrett Burniston, MB, BS, of Cronulla, New South Wales. For services to physically handicapped persons.
- Amy Gwendoline Caldwell, of Point Piper, New South Wales. For services to aviation.
- Robert Rothsay Cole, MC, Commissioner, Royal Papua and New Guinea Constabulary.
- Reginald Joseph Coombe, MBE, of Dulwich, South Australia. For services to migration.
- James Keith Donaldson, of Eastwood, New South Wales. For services to the dairy industry.
- Griffith Hammond Duncan, of Newcastle, New South Wales. For services to the community.
- Leonard William French, of Beaumaris, Victoria, Artist. For services to painting.
- William James Gibbs, of Blackburn, Victoria. Director, Commonwealth Bureau of Meteorology.
- James Harold Greenwood, Deputy Commissioner, Repatriation Department, New South Wales.
- Stefan Haag, of Edgecliff, New South Wales. For services to the development of the Arts in Australia.
- Geoffrey Antony Hawley, of East Lindfield, New South Wales, Commissioner, Export Payments Insurance Corporation.
- Harold Alan Jones, chairman, Australian Capital Territory Electricity Authority.
- Frances Christina Burrell McKay, MB, ChM, of Auburn, New South Wales, Chief of the Nursing Division, St. John Ambulance.
- Pastor Douglas Ralph Nicholls, MBE, of Fitzroy, Victoria. For services to Aborigines.
- Ruby Ethel Powell, Headmistress, Presbyterian Ladies' College, Burwood. For services to education.
- Rupert Rushby Rudder, of Vaucluse, New South Wales. For services to the dairy industry.
- Lance Adrian Scandrett, of Bellevue Hill, New South Wales. For community services.
- Hubert Roy Scotney, Commissioner, Australia Eastern Salvation Army. For community services.
- Thomas Henry Skelton, Director, Posts and Telegraphs, New South Wales.
- Kathleen Alice Syme, of Melbourne, Victoria. For community services.
- Alfred Charles Thomas, MB, ChM, of Hurstville, New South Wales. For services to medicine.
- Captain Ronald Frederick Uren, DFC, Chief Pilot, Qantas Airways Limited. For services to aviation.

==== Member of the Order of the British Empire (MBE) ====
Military Division

Royal Australian Navy

- Lieutenant Commander Keith Graham.
- Lieutenant Commander Norman Harold Henderson, VRD, ADC, Royal Australian Naval Volunteer Reserve.

Australian Military Forces

- Captain (temporary) (Quartermaster) Ernest Gerald Crooks (4337), Royal Australian Infantry Corps.
- Major Harry Neville Green, ED, (2111339), Royal Australian Infantry Corps.
- Major (temporary) Francis Richard John Gwynn (175072), Royal Australian Infantry Corps.
- Major James Henry Hoare (76), Royal Australian Infantry Corps.
- Major Colin Charles McGregor (237645), Australian Staff Corps.
- Major Cyril Hugh Morahan (240074), Australian Staff Corps.
- 51427 Warrant Officer Class I (temporary) Basil Thomas Webster Waters, Royal Australian Infantry Corps.
- Major Ronald Albert Wiltshire, ED, (293130), Royal Australian Electrical and Mechanical Engineers.

Royal Australian Air Force

- Squadron Leader Charles Bentley Liebke (03381).
- Warrant Officer Frank Edward Donohoo (A2158).
- Warrant Officer Thomas Leonard Elford (A31034).
- Warrant Officer Stanley Lucas (A2244).

Civil Division

- Fay Norma Bataille, of Norfolk Island. For services to education and the community.
- Harvey Bates, Inspector, Department of Customs and Excise, New South Wales.
- James Burke, Principal Attendant, Prime Minister's Department, Melbourne.
- Agnes Louise Burton, of Ormond, Victoria. For community services.
- Robert Main Wardrop Cunningham, Assistant Director-General (Pharmaceutical Services Branch), Department of Health, Canberra.
- John Wesley Davey, Director of Civil Personnel, Department of the Army, Canberra.
- Thomas Gordon Deegan, Territory of Papua and New Guinea. For services to aviation.
- Alderman Harold Eccles, JP, of Ermington, New South Wales. For services to local government and the community.
- Bruce Francis Ford, MB, BS, of O'Connor, Australian Capital Territory. For services to disabled and aged persons.
- Councillor Archibald Gordon Gorham, of Frogmore, New South Wales. For services to local government and the community.
- Alderman Ronald Thorneycroft Gosling, Mayor of the Municipality of Rockdale.
- Francis Grose, of Longueville, New South Wales. For services to the community.
- Maddalena Gustin, of Bankstown, New South Wales. For services to migrants.
- Captain Harry Percival Hadley, of Queenscliffe, New South Wales, Master of Princess of Tasmania.
- William John Hughes, of Bubia, Via Lae, Territory of Papua and New Guinea. For services to ex-servicemen and the community.
- Marie Constance Hunter, of Edwardstown, South Australia. Superintendent, Australian Red Cross Field Force, Vietnam.
- Iris McKenzie Hyde, of New Lambton, New South Wales. For services to the community.
- Thomas Richard Jacka, JP, of Turramurra, New South Wales. For services to ex-servicemen.
- John Edward Johnstone, of Frankston, Victoria. For services to Diving.
- Jan Dunin-Karwicki, of Mosman, New South Wales. For services to migrants.
- Francis Arthur Kennedy, Honorary Public Relations and Information Officer for the Returned Services League in the United Kingdom. For services to ex-servicemen.
- Lionel Courtenay St. Aubyn Key, of Canberra, former Deputy Parliamentary Librarian.
- Ernest Victor Llewellyn, Director, Canberra School of Music.
- William Henry Lyle Lucas, Engineer Class 5, Garden Island Dockyard, Department of the Navy.
- Alan Keith Lyall, of Frankston, Victoria. For services to the community.
- Cecil Fleming Metcalf, assistant director, Postal Services Division, Postmaster-General's Department, Western Australia.
- Charles Alexander Nettle, First Assistant Commissioner, Repatriation Department, Victoria.
- Percival Harold Outridge, of Murwillumbah, New South Wales. For public services.
- Victor Barrett Pedersen, of Katherine, Northern Territory. Major, Salvation Army. For services to outback communities.
- Helen Mary Phillips (Mrs. Milner), MB, BS, Superintendent, Darwin Hospital.
- Reverend Brother Placidus, of Traralgon, Victoria. Principal, St. Paul's College. For services to education.
- Olive May Proctor, of Gosford, New South Wales. For services to the Girl Guide movement and Far West Children's Health Scheme.
- Lionel Edmund Rose, of Essendon, Victoria. For services to sport.
- John Anderson Yates Rutter, Commissioner, Papua and New Guinea Electricity Commission.
- Henry Salter, of Kerang, Victoria. For services to the wool industry.
- Thomas Barrow Sheppard, of Rapid Creek, Northern Territory. Temporary Engineer, Class 3, Department of Works.
- Professor William Stephenson, of Balmoral Heights, Queensland. For services to education.
- Hugh Vivian Taylor, of Toorak, Victoria. For services to acoustics.
- John Barrie Tiernan, Detective Sergeant of Fannie Bay, Northern Territory. For services to the community.
- Nason Tokiala, JP, Paramount Luluai of Nanga Nanga Village, New Guinea. For services to the community.
- Milton John Toohey, Engineer, Class 5, Postmaster-General's Department, New South Wales.
- Clifford Ernest Tuttleby, DFC, AFM, of Frankston, Victoria. Former senior examiner of Airmen, Department of Civil Aviation.
- Mary Ward, of Banka Banka Northern Territory. For services to Aborigines.

=== Companion of the Imperial Service Order (ISO) ===
- Harold Clarence Affleck, lately Regional Aircraft Surveyor, Department of Civil Aviation, New South Wales.
- Ernest Kenneth Simmons, lately assistant director, Postal Services Division, Postmaster-General's Department, South Australia.
- Ernest Albert Edwards, Deputy Commissioner of Taxation, South Australia.

=== British Empire Medal (BEM) ===
Military Division

Australian Military Forces

- 22388 Warrant Officer II (temporary) Norman Cross, Royal Australian Engineers.
- 15400 Sergeant William Joseph Hoban, Royal Australian Infantry Corps.
- 346407 Sergeant Richard William Houlcroft, Royal Australian Army Medical Corps.
- 2950 Staff Sergeant Vivian Joseph Irvine, Royal Australian Signals Corps.
- 81170 Corporal (temporary) Kirung Tapit, Royal Australian Infantry Corps.
- 258892 Sergeant Desmond Michael O'Connell, Royal Australian Infantry Corps.
- 28999 Staff Sergeant John Daniel O'Shea, Royal Australian Infantry Corps.
- 847 Warrant Officer Class II (temporary) Telek, Royal Australian Infantry Corps.
- 212549 Corporal (temporary) Anthony James Urquhart, Royal Australian Engineers.
- 16663 Sergeant Kevin Stanley Wendt, Royal Australian Infantry Corps.

Royal Australian Air Force

- A21105 Flight Sergeant Leon Jeffery Hawes.
- A23730 Flight Sergeant Robert John McShane.
- A6387 Flight Sergeant Brian Rodwell Merry.
- A24200 Sergeant John George Pound.
- A39655 Corporal Brian Gibson Love.

Civil Division

- Reginald Charles Abbott, Foreman, Grade 3, Department of the Navy.
- Vera Minnie Elizabeth Addison. For services to the community of Kangaroo Ground, Victoria.
- Thomas Urich Agst. For services to the community of Hardy's Bay, New South Wales.
- William James Shields Aplin, Senior Technical Officer, Grade 2, Department of the Navy.
- Jessie Louise Arrowsmith. For services to the community of Gloucester, New South Wales.
- Douglas Henry David Beadel, Senior Technical Officer, Grade 2, Department of Civil Aviation, Konedobu, Territory of Papua and New Guinea.
- George Frederick Buckley, JP. For services to ex-servicemen, of Wentworthville, New South Wales.
- David Burchell. For services to Diving and the collection of Australian War Relics, Tusmore, South Australia.
- Hilda Carey. For services to the community of North Sydney, New South Wales.
- Clifford Herbert Collins, Formerly Male Nurse, Repatriation Department, West Hawthorn, Western Australia.
- Phyllis Louise Jessie Congress, Typist in Charge, Grade 1, Department of Immigration, Western Australia.
- Beatrice Mary Corsini. For services to the community of Oaks Estate, Australian Capital Territory.
- Bernard James Evans. For public services, Canungra, Queensland.
- George Fisher. For services to the welfare of ex-servicemen, Waverley, New South Wales.
- Jon Charles Hayes. For services to ex-servicemen, Marrickville, New South Wales.
- Kenneth Kaiw. For public services in the Territory of Papua and New Guinea.
- Lillian Keys. For services to the community of Piggabeen, New South Wales.
- David Lamond, lately Superintendent (Maintenance), Australian Capital Territory Electricity Authority.
- Richard Logan, Clerical Assistant, Grade 4, Postmaster General's Department, Victoria.
- Raymond John McCabe, Sergeant, Commonwealth Police Force, Vietnam.
- Charles Edmond McCarty, Supervising Technician, Grade 3, Postmaster General's Department, Australian Capital Territory.
- Murdoch McGregor, Superintendent of Installations, Australian Capital Territory Electricity Authority.
- Violet Annabel McInnes. For services to the community of Concord, New South Wales
- Edith Hazel Moffett. For services to the community of Werris Creek, New South Wales.
- Lloyd Robert George Newman. For services to ex-servicemen, Croydon, New South Wales.
- John O'Brien, Technician's Assistant, Australian Broadcasting Commission, Victoria.
- Leonard John Parle, Australian Vice-Consul, United Arab Republic.
- John Ernest Penny, Clerical Assistant, Grade 4, Department of Trade and Industry, Australian Capital Territory.
- Frank Sutton. For services to ex-servicemen, Campsie, New South Wales.
- Gordon William Taylor. For services to the community of Griffith, Australian Capital Territory.
- Francis Joseph Wood, Programme Officer, Australian Broadcasting Commission, Boroko, Territory of Papua and New Guinea.

=== Royal Red Cross (RRC) ===
- Group Officer Helen Agnes Cleary, ARRC, Royal Australian Air Force Nursing Service.

==== Associate of the Royal Red Cross (ARRC) ====
- Squadron Officer Muriel Anne Monger (N23041), Royal Australian Air Force Nursing Service.

=== Air Force Cross (AFC) ===
Royal Australian Air Force

- Squadron Leader Douglas George Cameron (024862).
- Flight Lieutenant Bruce Clarke (0216658).
- Flight Lieutenant Desmond Howard Francis Gibbs (053758).

=== Queen's Commendation for Valuable Service in the Air ===
Royal Australian Air Force

- Flight Lieutenant Arthur Stanley Matters (017952).
- Flight Lieutenant John Terence Owens (015636).
- Flight Lieutenant Barry William Seedsman (032527).

=== Queen's Police Medal (QPM) ===
- John Francis, Superintendent, Papua/New Guinea Police Force.
- Henry Mola Tohian, Sub-Inspector, Papua/New Guinea Police Force.

== Jamaica ==
=== Order of the British Empire ===
==== Commander of the Order of the British Empire (CBE) ====
Civil Division

- The Right Reverend John Cyril Emerson Swaby, Bishop of Jamaica.

==== Officer of the Order of the British Empire (OBE) ====
Military Division

- Lieutenant-Colonel John Alexander Howell Duffus, The Jamaica Regiment (National Reserve).

==== Member of the Order of the British Empire (MBE) ====
Military Division

- Warrant Officer Cecil Leonard Warren, Jamaica Military Band.

Civil Division

- Thelma Phyllis Campbell, Executive Secretary, National Volunteers Organisation.
- William Clemenson McDowell Jervis, Deputy Commandant, Island Special Constabulary Force.

=== Companion of the Imperial Service Order (ISO) ===
- Rupert Newton Smellie, Commissioner of Income Tax.

=== British Empire Medal (BEM) ===
Civil Division

- Gerald Alphonso Dwyer, Barrack Inventory Accountant, Married Quarters Administrative Staff, Jamaica Defence Force.

=== Queen's Police Medal (QPM) ===
- Athelstan Canute Folkes, Assistant Commissioner, Jamaica Constabulary Force.

== Gambia ==
=== Order of Saint Michael and Saint George ===
==== Companion of the Order of St Michael and St George (CMG) ====
- Eric Herbert Christensen, Permanent Secretary, Prime Minister's Office and Head of the Public Service.

=== Order of the British Empire ===
==== Member of the Order of the British Empire (MBE) ====
Civil Division

- John Gwyn Rees, Senior Health Superintendent.

== Mauritius ==
=== Knight Bachelor ===
- Michel Jean Joseph Laval Rivalland, MBE, Chief Justice.

=== Order of the British Empire ===
==== Commander of the Order of the British Empire (CBE) ====
Civil Division

- His Excellency Dr. Leckraz Teelock, MB, ChB, High Commissioner for Mauritius in London.

==== Officer of the Order of the British Empire (OBE) ====
Civil Division

- Marcel Maurice Arthur Lagesse. For services to Mauritius in connection with the Montreal Expo 67.
- Abdool Cader Dawood Abdool Raman, LRCP, MRCS, Medical Superintendent, Brown Sequard Hospital.
- Dayanundlall Basant Rai. For services in local government.

==== Member of the Order of the British Empire (MBE) ====
Civil Division

- Riette Lebon, Personal Secretary to the Prime Minister.
- Roopnarain Seewoodharry Buguth, Principal Executive Officer, Ministry of Health.
- Khemraj Gangah. For public welfare services.
