= Premierships of Harold Wilson =

Period of the Government of the United Kingdom from 1964 to 1970 and 1974 to 1976

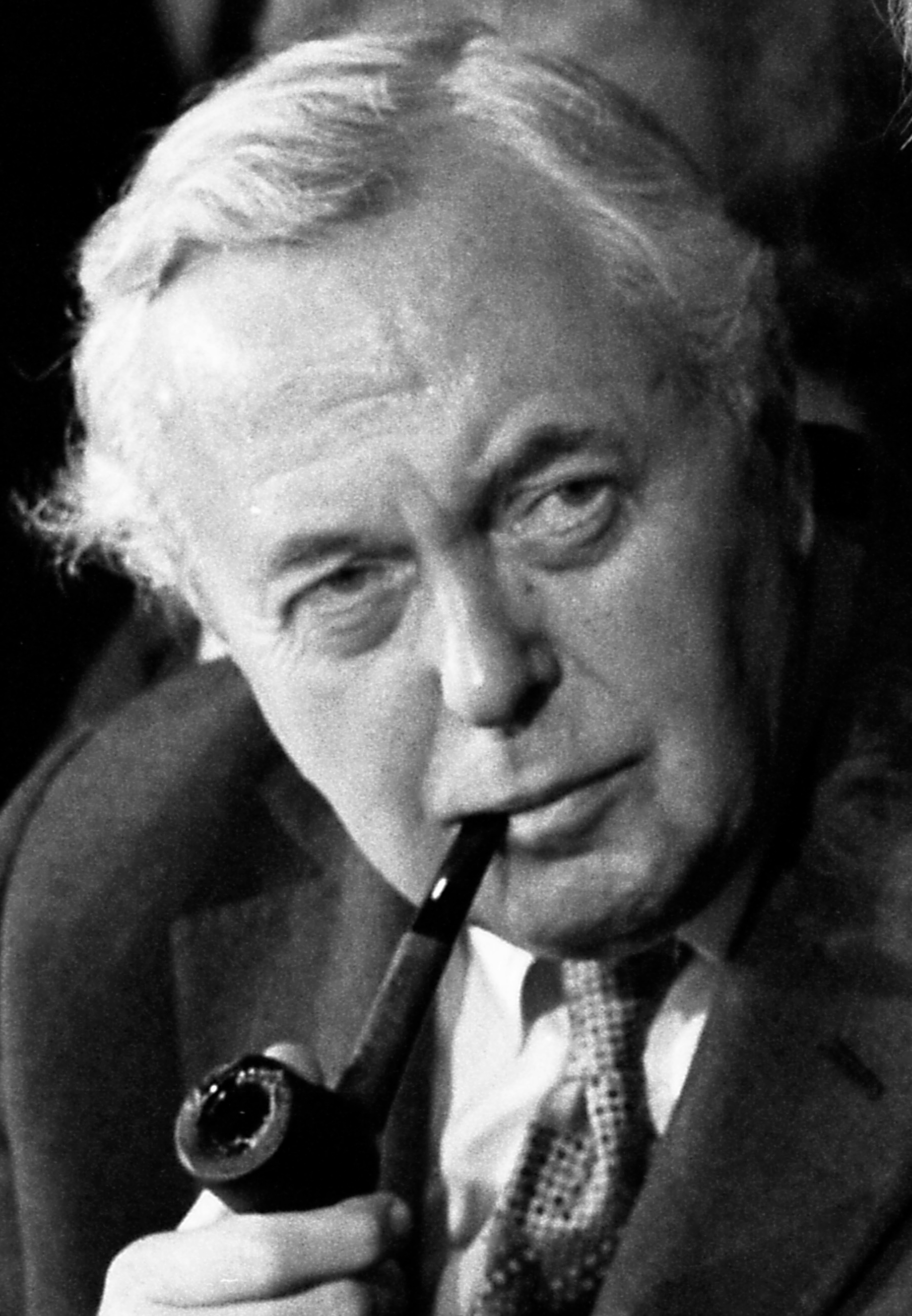
- Wilson in 1975
- Premierships of Harold Wilson
- Monarch: Elizabeth II
- Prime Minister: Harold Wilson
- Party: Labour
- Seat: 10 Downing Street
- First term 16 October 1964 – 19 June 1970
- Cabinet: First Wilson ministry; Second Wilson ministry
- Election: 1964; 1966
- Second term 4 March 1974 – 5 April 1976
- Cabinet: Third Wilson ministry; Fourth Wilson ministry
- Election: Feb 1974; Oct 1974
- Coat of arms of HM Government

Harold Wilson had two terms as Prime Minister of the United Kingdom. His first premiership began in 1964 when Labour won the 1964 general election, and was consolidated two years later in the 1966 general election, when Labour won a much larger majority.

His first term as prime minister was noted for its liberal social reforms, and the expansion of education and social services, however it was also hindered by persistent problems with Britain's external balance of trade.

Labour lost power at the 1970 general election, but Wilson returned for a second term as Prime Minister of a minority government with the February 1974 election, which was consolidated later that year at the October 1974 election, in which Labour won a slim majority. In his second term, Wilson oversaw the 1975 referendum on Britain's membership of the European Community. His premiership ended when he resigned unexpectedly in 1976.

== First premiership (1964–1970) ==
=== Appointment ===
Labour won the 1964 general election with a narrow majority of four seats, and Wilson became prime minister, at 48 the youngest person to hold that office since Lord Rosebery 70 years earlier. During 1965, by-election losses reduced the government's majority to a single seat; but in March 1966 Wilson took the gamble of calling another general election. The gamble paid off, because this time Labour achieved a 96-seat majority over the Conservatives, who the previous year had made Edward Heath their leader.

=== Domestic affairs ===
The 1964–1970 Labour government carried out a broad range of reforms during its time in office, in such areas as social security, civil liberties, housing, health, education, and worker's rights.

==== Economic policies ====
Wilson's government put faith in economic planning as a way to solve Britain's economic problems. The government's strategy involved setting up a Department of Economic Affairs (DEA) which would draw up a National Plan which was intended to promote growth and investment. Wilson believed that scientific progress was the key to economic and social advancement, as such he famously referred to the "white heat of technology", in reference to the modernisation of British industry. This was to be achieved through a new Ministry of Technology (shortened to "Mintech") which would coordinate research and development and support the swift adoption of new technology by industry, aided by government-funded infrastructure improvements.

In practice, however, events derailed much of the initial optimism. Upon coming to power, the government was informed that they had inherited an exceptionally large deficit of £800 million on Britain's balance of trade. This partly reflected the preceding government's expansive fiscal policy in the run-up to the 1964 election. Immediately the pound came under enormous pressure, and many economists advocated devaluation of the pound in response, but Wilson resisted, reportedly in part out of concern that Labour, which had previously devalued sterling in 1949, would become tagged as "the party of devaluation". Wilson also believed that a devaluation would disproportionately harm low-income Britons with savings and poorer Commonwealth of Nations countries in the sterling area. The government instead opted to deal with the problem by imposing a temporary surcharge on imports, and a series of deflationary measures designed to reduce demand and therefore the inflow of imports. In the latter half of 1967, an attempt was made to prevent the recession in activity from going too far in the form of a stimulus to consumer durable spending through an easing of credit, which in turn prevented a rise in unemployment.

After a costly battle, market pressures forced the government to devalue the pound by 14% from $2.80 to $2.40 in November 1967. Wilson was much criticised for a broadcast soon after in which he assured listeners that the "pound in your pocket" had not lost its value. Economic performance did show some improvement after the devaluation, as economists had predicted. The devaluation, with accompanying austerity measures which ensured resources went into exports rather than domestic consumption, successfully restored the trade balance to surplus by 1970. In retrospect Wilson has been widely criticised for not devaluing earlier, however, he believed there were strong arguments against it, including the fear that it would set off a round of competitive devaluations, and concern about the impact price rises following a devaluation would have on people on low incomes.

The government's decision over its first three years to defend sterling's parity with traditional deflationary measures ran counter to hopes for an expansionist push for growth. The National Plan produced by the DEA in 1965 targeted an annual growth rate of 3.8%, however, under the restrained circumstances the actual average rate of growth between 1964 and 1970 was a far more modest 2.2%. The DEA itself was wound up in 1969. The government's other main initiative Mintech did have some success at switching research and development spending from military to civilian purposes, and of achieving increases in industrial productivity, although persuading industry to adopt new technology proved more difficult than had been hoped. Faith in indicative planning as a pathway to growth, embodied in the DEA and Mintech, was at the time by no means confined to the Labour Party. Wilson built on foundations that had been laid by his Conservative predecessors, in the shape, for example, of the National Economic Development Council (known as "Neddy") and its regional counterparts (the "little Neddies"). Government intervention in industry was greatly enhanced, with the National Economic Development Office greatly strengthened and the number of "little Neddies" was increased, from eight in 1964 to twenty-one in 1970. The government's policy of selective economic intervention was later characterised by the establishment of a new super-ministry of technology, a connexion not always publicly grasped, under Tony Benn.

The continued relevance of industrial nationalisation (a centrepiece of the post-War Labour government's programme) had been a key point of contention in Labour's internal struggles of the 1950s and early 1960s. Wilson's predecessor as leader, Hugh Gaitskell, had tried in 1960 to tackle the controversy head-on, with a proposal to expunge Clause Four (the public ownership clause) from the party's constitution, but had been forced to climb down. Wilson took a characteristically more subtle approach: No significant expansion of public ownership took place under Wilson's government, however, he placated the party's left-wing by renationalising the steel industry under the Iron and Steel Act 1967 (which had been denationalised by the Conservatives in the 1950s) creating the British Steel Corporation.

One innovation of the Wilson government was the creation in 1968 of the Girobank, a publicly owned bank which operated via the General Post Office network: As most working-class people in the 1960s did not have bank accounts, this was designed to serve their needs, as such it was billed as the "people's bank". Girobank was a long-term success, surviving until 2003.

Wilson's government presided over a rate of unemployment which was low by historic (and later) standards but did rise during his period in office. Between 1964 and 1966 the average rate of unemployment was 1.6%, while between 1966 and 1970 the average stood at 2.5%. He had entered power at a time when unemployment stood at around 400,000. It still stood at 371,000 by early 1966 after a steady fall during 1965, but by March 1967 it stood at 631,000. It fell again towards the end of the decade, standing at 582,000 by the time of the general election in June 1970.

Despite the economic difficulties faced by Wilson's government, it was able to achieve important advances in several domestic policy areas. As reflected by Wilson in 1971:

It was a government which faced disappointment after disappointment and none greater than the economic restraints in our ability to carry through the social revolution to which we were committed at the speed we would have wished. Yet, despite those restraints and the need to transfer resources from domestic expenditure, private and public, to the needs of our export markets, we carried through an expansion in the social services, health, welfare and housing, unparalleled in our history.

==== Social reforms ====
Wilson's government is perhaps best remembered for its liberal social reforms, notable amongst these was the Race Relations Act 1965 which was the first piece of legislation to address race relations and racial discrimination, the Murder (Abolition of Death Penalty) Act 1965 which abolished capital punishment (except for a small number of offences — notably high treason) the Sexual Offences Act 1967, which partially decriminalised male homosexuality and the Abortion Act 1967, which legalised abortion, the abolition of theatre censorship by the Theatres Act 1968, and the liberalisation of divorce law by the Divorce Reform Act 1969. While many of these measures were introduced as private member's bills, and given a free vote, the government effectively supported them by giving them parliamentary time, this was especially true during Roy Jenkins's tenure as Home Secretary (1965–1967), with whom the liberal reform agenda is particularly associated. Wilson personally, coming culturally from a provincial non-conformist background, showed no particular enthusiasm for much of this agenda.

Another significant development was the Representation of the People Act 1969, which made Britain the first major democratic nation to lower the voting age from 21 to 18. This came into effect in time for the 1970 general election.

==== Education ====
Higher education held special significance for a Labourite of Wilson's generation, given its role in both opening up opportunities for ambitious youth from working-class backgrounds and enabling Britain to seize the potential benefits of scientific advances. Under the first Wilson government, for the first time in British history, more money was allocated to education than to defence. Wilson continued the rapid creation of new universities, in line with the recommendations of the Robbins Report, a bipartisan policy already in train when Labour took power.

Wilson promoted the concept of an Open University, to give adults who had missed out on tertiary education a second chance through part-time study and distance learning. His political commitment included assigning implementation responsibility to Baroness Lee, the widow of Aneurin Bevan. By 1981, 45,000 students had received degrees through the Open University. Money was also channelled into local-authority run colleges of education.

Wilson's record on secondary education was motivated by growing pressure for the abolition of the selective principle underlying the "eleven-plus", and replacement with Comprehensive schools which would serve the full range of children (see the article 'grammar schools debate'). Comprehensive education became Labour Party policy. From 1966 to 1970, the proportion of children in comprehensive schools increased from about 10% to over 30%.

Labour pressed local authorities to convert grammar schools into comprehensives. Conversion continued on a large scale during the subsequent Conservative Heath administration, although the Secretary of State, Margaret Thatcher, ended the compulsion of local governments to convert.

In 1968, Wilson's first government reluctantly decided it could not fulfil its long-held promise to raise the school leaving age to 16, because budget cuts left it unable to fulfil the investment required in infrastructure, such as tens of thousands of new classrooms and teachers.

Overall, public expenditure on education rose as a proportion of GNP from 4.8% in 1964 to 5.9% in 1968, and the number of teachers in training increased by more than a third between 1964 and 1967. The percentage of students staying on at school after the age of sixteen increased similarly, and the student population increased by over 10% each year. Pupil-teacher ratios were also steadily reduced. As a result of the first Wilson government's educational policies, opportunities for the working-class were improved; overall access to education in 1970 was broader than in 1964. As summarised by Brian Lapping,

The years 1964–70 were largely taken up with creating extra places in universities, polytechnics, technical colleges, colleges of education: preparing for the day when a new Act would make it the right of a student, on leaving school, to have a place in an institution of further education.

In 1966, Wilson was created the first Chancellor of the newly created University of Bradford, a position he held until 1985.

==== Housing ====
Housing was a major policy area under the first Wilson government. During Wilson's time in office from 1964 to 1970, more new houses were built than in the last six years of the previous Conservative government. The proportion of council housing rose from 42% to 50% of the total, while the number of council homes built increased steadily, from 119,000 in 1964 to 133,000 in 1965 and 142,000 in 1966. Allowing for demolitions, 1.3 million new homes were built between 1965 and 1970, Although concerns were raised about the quality of much of the new housing, which was often cheaply built high-rise stock (the latter came in for particular criticism following the Ronan Point collapse in 1968).

To encourage homeownership, the government introduced the Option Mortgage Scheme (1968), which made low-income housebuyers eligible for subsidies (equivalent to tax relief on mortgage interest payments). This scheme had the effect of reducing housing costs for buyers on low incomes and enabling more people to become owner-occupiers. In addition, house owners were exempted from capital gains tax. Together with the Option Mortgage Scheme, this measure stimulated the private housing market. Wilson in a 1967 speech said: "..the grime and muddle and decay of our Victorian heritage is being replaced. The new city centres with their university precincts, their light, clean and well-spaced civic buildings, will not merely brighten the physical environment of our people, they will change the very quality of urban life in Britain."

Significant emphasis was also placed on town planning, with new conservation areas introduced and a new generation of new towns built, notably Milton Keynes. The New Towns Acts of 1965 and 1968 together gave the government the authority (through its ministries) to designate any area of land as a site for a new town.

==== Urban renewal ====
Many subsidies were allocated to local authorities faced with acute areas of severe poverty (or other social problems). The Housing Act 1969 provided local authorities with the duty of working out what to do about 'unsatisfactory areas'. Local authorities could declare 'general improvement areas' in which they would be able to buy up land and houses and spend environmental improvement grants. On the same basis, taking geographical areas of need, a package was developed by the government which resembled a miniature poverty programme. In July 1967, the government decided to pour money into what the Plowden Committee defined as Educational Priority Areas, poverty-stricken areas where children were environmentally deprived. Some poor inner-city areas were subsequently granted EPA status (despite concerns that Local Education Authorities would be unable to finance Educational Priority Areas). From 1968 to 1970, 150 new schools were built under the educational priority programme.

==== Social Services and welfare ====
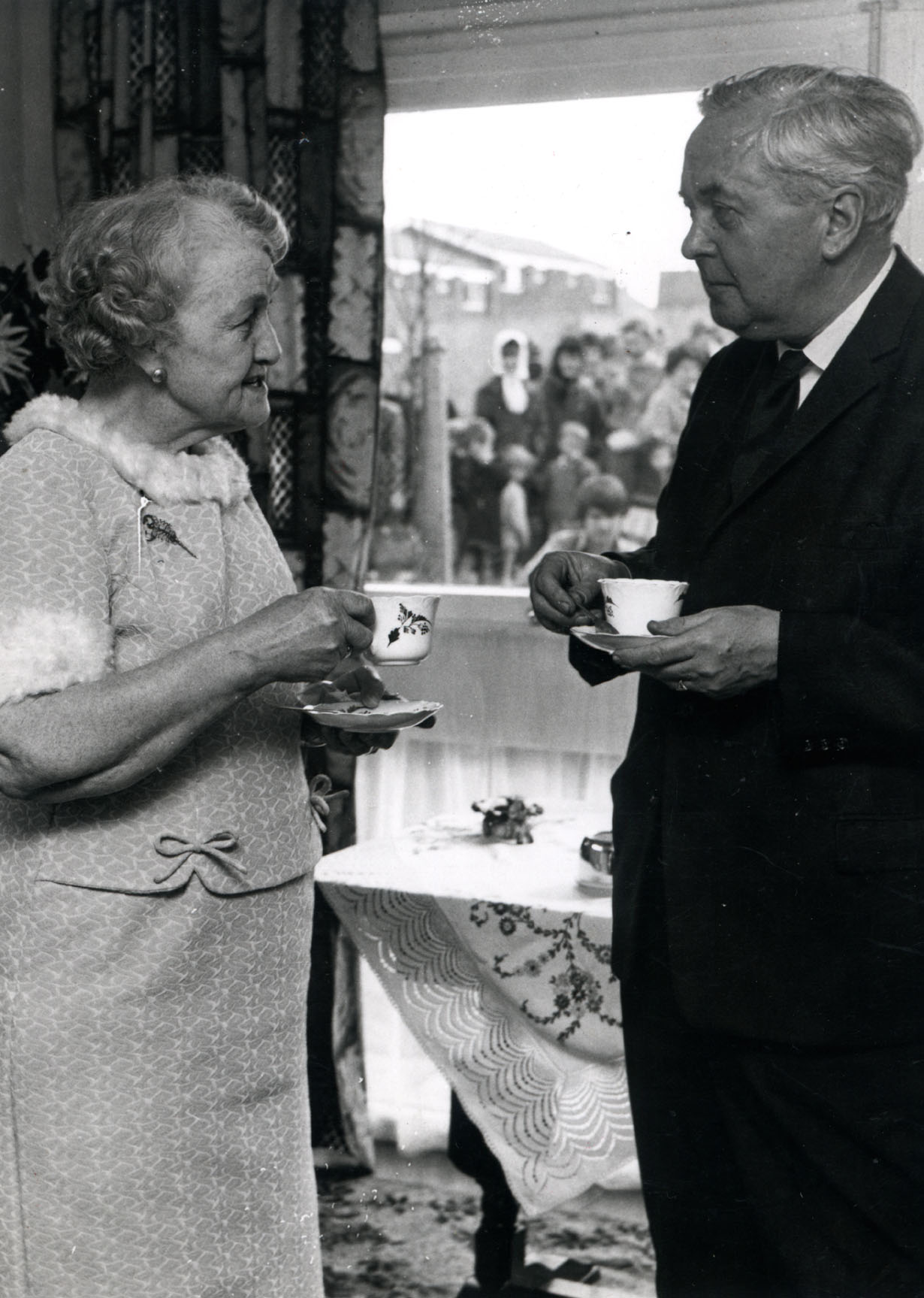
Wilson on a visit to a retirement home in Washington, County Durham

Various reforms to social welfare were also carried out during Wilson's time in office. According to Tony Atkinson, social security received much more attention from the first Wilson government than it did during the previous thirteen years of Conservative government. Following its victory in the 1964 general election, Wilson's government began to increase social benefits. Prescription charges for medicines were abolished immediately, (Note: however, they were reinstated two years later) while pensions were raised to a record 21% of average male industrial wages. In 1966, the system of National Assistance (a social assistance scheme for the poor) was overhauled and renamed Supplementary Benefit. Before the 1966 election, the widow's pension was tripled. Due to austerity measures following an economic crisis, prescription charges were re-introduced in 1968 as an alternative to cutting the hospital building programme, although those sections of the population who were most in need (including supplementary benefit claimants, the long-term sick, children, and pensioners) were exempted from charges.

The widow's earning rule was also abolished, while a range of new social benefits was introduced. An Act was passed which replaced National Assistance with Supplementary Benefits. The new Act laid down that people who satisfied its conditions were entitled to these noncontributory benefits. The means test was replaced with a statement of income, and benefit rates for pensioners (the great majority of claimants) were increased, granting them a real gain in income. Unlike the National Assistance scheme, which operated on a discretionary basis, the new Supplementary Benefits scheme was a right of every citizen who found himself or herself in severe difficulties. Those persons over the retirement age with no means who were considered to be unable to live on the basic pension (which provided less than what the government deemed as necessary for subsistence) became entitled to a "long-term" allowance of an extra few shillings a week. Some simplification of the procedure for claiming benefits was also introduced. From 1966, an exceptionally severe disablement allowance was added, "for those claimants receiving constant attendance allowance which was paid to those with the higher or intermediate rates of constant attendance allowance and who were exceptionally severely disabled." Redundancy payments were introduced in 1965 to lessen the impact of unemployment, and earnings-related benefits for maternity, unemployment, sickness, industrial injuries and widowhood were introduced in 1966, followed by the replacement of flat-rate family allowances with an earnings-related scheme in 1968. From July 1966 onwards, the temporary allowance for widows of severely disabled pensioners was extended from 13 to 26 weeks. In 1970 a bill was passed that introduced a new benefit for handicapped children and their families called the Attendance Allowance, although this was not enacted until the following year by the Heath Administration.

Increases were made in pensions and other benefits during Wilson's first year in office that were the largest ever real term increases carried out up until that point. Social security benefits were markedly increased during Wilson's first two years in office, as characterised by a budget passed in the final quarter of 1964 which raised the standard benefit rates for old age, sickness and invalidity by 18.5%. In 1965, the government increased the national assistance rate to a higher level relative to earnings, and via annual adjustments, broadly maintained the rate at between 19% and 20% of gross industrial earnings until the start of 1970. Through a series of ad hoc annual upratings, as noted by one study, Wilson's government "generally maintained the value of benefits in relation to earnings".

In the five years from 1964 up until the last increases made by the First Wilson Government, pensions went up by 23% in real terms, supplementary benefits by 26% in real terms, and sickness and unemployment benefits by 153% in real terms (largely as a result of the introduction of earnings-related benefits in 1967).

==== Agriculture ====
Under the First Wilson Government, subsidies for farmers were increased. Farmers who wished to leave the land or retire became eligible for grants or annuities if their holdings were sold for approved amalgamations, and could receive those benefits whether they wished to remain in their farmhouses or not. A Small Farmers Scheme was also extended, and from 1 December 1965, forty thousand more farmers became eligible for the maximum £1,000 grant. New grants to agriculture also encouraged the voluntary pooling of smallholdings, and in cases where their land was purchased for non-commercial purposes, tenant-farmers could now receive double the previous "disturbance compensation". A Hill Land Improvement Scheme, introduced by the Agriculture Act 1967, provided 50% grants for a wide range of land improvements, along with a supplementary 10% grant on drainage works benefitting hill land. The Agriculture Act 1967 also provided grants to promote farm amalgamation and to compensate outgoers.

==== Health ====
The proportion of GNP spent on the National Health Service rose from 4.2% in 1964 to about 5% in 1969. This additional expenditure provided for an energetic revival of a policy of building health centres for general practitioners, extra pay for doctors who served in areas particularly short of them, significant growth in hospital staffing, and a significant increase in a hospital building programme. Far more money was spent each year on the NHS than under the 1951–64 Conservative governments, while much more effort was put into modernising and reorganising the health service. Stronger central and regional organisations were established for bulk purchase of hospital supplies, while some efforts were made to reduce inequalities in standards of care. In addition, the government increased the intake to medical schools.

The 1966 Doctor's Charter introduced allowances for rent and ancillary staff, significantly increased the pay scales, and changed the structure of payments to reflect "both qualifications of doctors and the form of their practices, i.e. group practice". These changes not only led to higher morale, but also resulted in the increased use of ancillary staff and nursing attachments, growth in the number of health centres and group practices, and a boost in the modernisation of practices in terms of equipment, appointment systems, and buildings. The charter introduced a new system of payment for GPs, with refunds for surgery, rents, and rates, to ensure that the costs of improving his surgery did not diminish the doctor's income, together with allowances for the greater part of ancillary staff costs. In addition, a Royal Commission on medical education was set up, partly to draw up ideas for training GPs (since these doctors, the largest group of all doctors in the country, had previously not received any special training, "merely being those who, at the end of their pre-doctoral courses, did not go on for further training in any speciality").

In 1967, local authorities were empowered to provide free family planning advice and means-tested contraceptive devices. In addition, medical training was expanded following the Todd Report on medical education in 1968. In addition, National Health expenditure rose from 4.2% of GNP in 1964 to 5% in 1969 and spending on hospital construction doubled. The Health Services and Public Health Act 1968 empowered local authorities to maintain workshops for the elderly either directly or via the agency of a voluntary body. A Health Advisory Service was later established to investigate and confront the problems of long-term psychiatric and mentally subnormal hospitals in the wave of numerous scandals. The Clean Air Act 1968 extended powers to combat air pollution. More money was also allocated to hospitals treating the mentally ill. In addition, a Sports Council was set up to improve facilities. Direct government expenditure on sports more than doubled from £0.9 million in 1964/65 to £2 million in 1967/68, while 11 regional Sports Councils had been set up by 1968. In Wales, five new health centres had been opened by 1968, whereas none had been opened from 1951 to 1964, while spending on health and welfare services in the region went up from £55.8 million in 1963/64 to £83.9 million in 1967/68.

==== Workers ====
The Industrial Training Act 1964 set up an Industrial Training Board to encourage training for people in work, and within seven years there were "27 ITBs covering employers with some 15 million workers." From 1964 to 1968, the number of training places had doubled. The Docks and Harbours Act (1966) and the Dock Labour Scheme (1967) reorganised the system of employment in the docks in order to put an end to casual employment. The changes made to the Dock Labour Scheme in 1967 ensured a complete end to casual labour on the docks, effectively giving workers the security of jobs for life. Trade unions also benefited from the passage of the Trade Disputes Act 1965. This restored the legal immunity of trade union officials, thus ensuring that they could no longer be sued for threatening to strike.

The First Wilson Government also encouraged married women to return to teaching and improved Assistance Board Concessionary conditions for those teaching part-time, "by enabling them to qualify for pension rights and by formulating a uniform scale of payment throughout the country." Soon after coming into office, midwives and nurses were given an 11% pay increase, and according to one MP, nurses also benefited from the largest pay rise they had received in a generation. In May 1966, Wilson introduced 30% pay rises for doctors and dentists — a move which did not prove popular with unions, as the national pay policy at the time was for rises of between 3% and 3.5%.

Much needed improvements were made in junior hospital doctors' salaries. From 1959 to 1970, while the earnings of manual workers increased by 75%, the salaries of registrars more than doubled while those of house officers more than trebled. Most of these improvements, such as for nurses, came in the pay settlements of 1970. On a limited scale, reports by the National Board for Prices and Incomes encouraged incentive payments schemes to be developed in local government and elsewhere. In February 1969, the government accepted an "above the ceiling" increase for farmworkers, a low-paid group. Some groups of professional workers, such as nurses, teachers, and doctors, gained substantial awards.

==== Transport ====
The Travel Concessions Act 1964, one of the first Acts passed by the First Wilson Government, provided concessions to all pensioners travelling on buses operated by municipal transport authorities. The Transport Act 1968 established the principle of government grants for transport authorities if uneconomic passenger services were justified on social grounds. A National Freight Corporation was also established to provide integrated rail freight and road services. Public expenditure on roads steadily increased and stricter safety precautions were introduced, such as the breathalyser test for drunken driving, under the 1967 Road Traffic Act. The Transport Act gave a much needed financial boost to British Rail, treating them like they were a company which had become bankrupt but could now, under new management, carry on debt-free. The act also established a national freight corporation and introduced government rail subsidies for passenger transport on the same basis as existing subsidies for roads to enable local authorities to improve public transport in their areas.

The road-building programme was also expanded, with capital expenditure increased to 8% of GDP, "the highest level achieved by any post-war government". Central government expenditure on roads went up from £125 million in 1963/64 to £225 million in 1967/68, while a number of road safety regulations were introduced, covering seat belts, lorry drivers' hours, car and lorry standards, and an experimental 70 mile per hour speed limit. In Scotland, spending on trunk roads went up from £6.8 million in 1963/64 to £15.5 million in 1966/67, while in Wales, spending on Welsh roads went up from £21.2 million in 1963/64 to £31.4 million in 1966/67.

==== Regional development ====
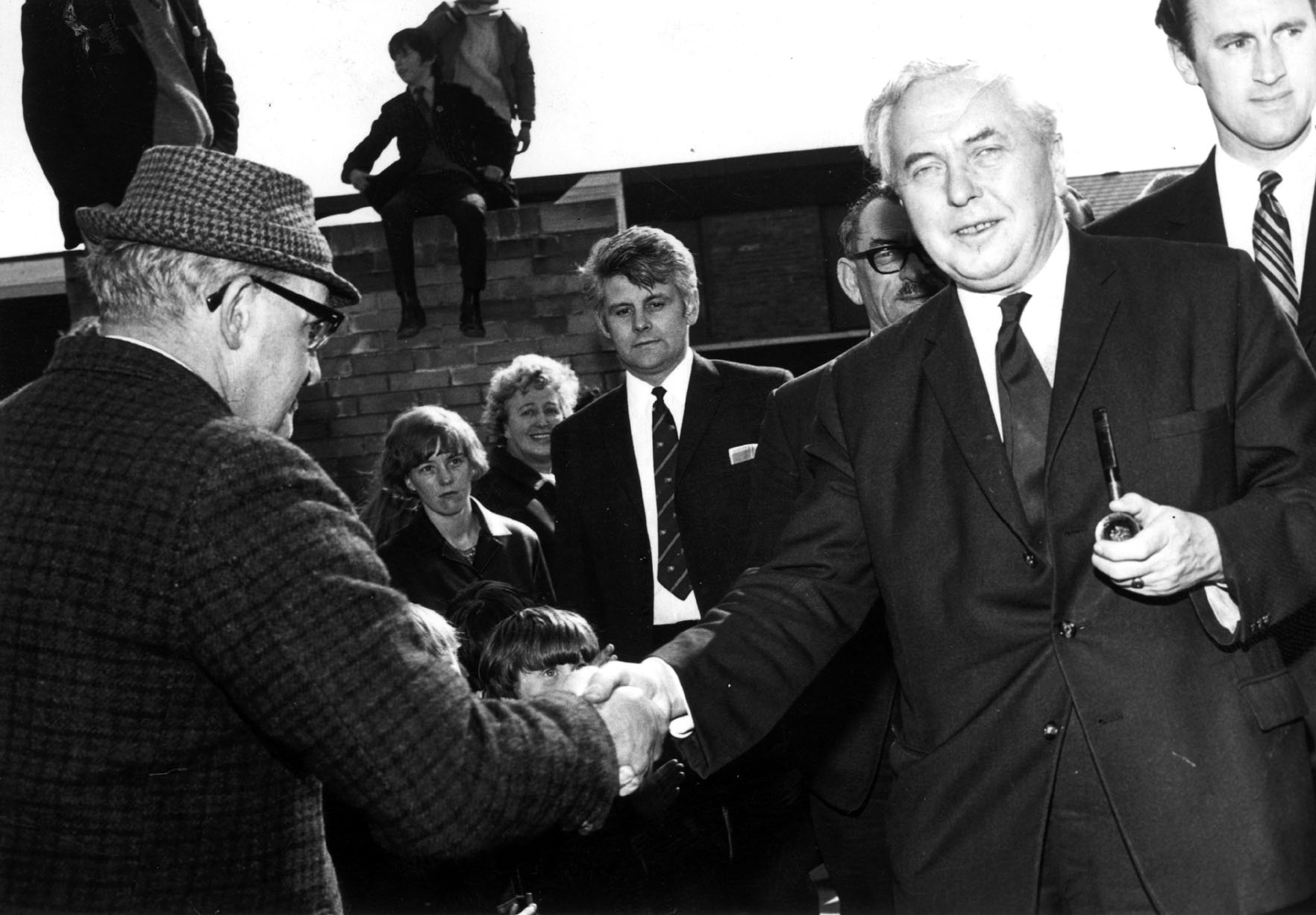
Wilson meeting the public in the late-1960s

Encouragement of regional development was given increased attention under the First Wilson Government, to narrow economic disparities between the various regions. A policy was introduced in 1965 whereby any new government organisation should be established outside London and in 1967 the government decided to give preference to development areas. A few government departments were also moved out of London, with the Royal Mint moved to South Wales, the Giro and Inland Revenue to Bootle, and the Motor Tax Office to Swansea. A new Special Development Status was also introduced in 1967 to provide even higher levels of assistance. In 1966, five development areas (covering half the population in the UK) were established, while subsidies were provided for employers recruiting new employees in the Development Areas. A Highlands and Islands Development Board was also set up to "re-invigorate" the north of Scotland.

The Industrial Development Act 1966 changed the name of Development Districts (parts of the country with higher levels of unemployment than the national average and which governments sought to encourage greater investment in) to Development Areas and increased the percentage of the workforce covered by development schemes from 15% to 20%, which mainly affected rural areas in Scotland and Wales. Tax allowances were replaced by grants to extend coverage to include firms which were not making a profit, and in 1967 a Regional Employment Premium was introduced. Whereas the existing schemes tended to favour capital-intensive projects, this aimed for the first time at increasing employment in depressed areas. Set at 30s per employee per week and guaranteed for seven years, the Regional Employment Premium subsidised all manufacturing industry (though not services) in Development Areas, amounting to an average subsidy of 7% of labour costs.

Regional unemployment differentials were narrowed, and spending on regional infrastructure was significantly increased. Between 1965–66 and 1969–70, yearly expenditure on new construction (including power stations, roads, schools, hospitals and housing) rose by 41% in the United Kingdom as a whole. Subsidies were also provided for various industries (such as shipbuilding in Clydeside), which helped to prevent many job losses. It is estimated that, between 1964 and 1970, 45,000 government jobs were created outside London, 21,000 of which were located in the Development Areas. The Local Employment Act, passed in March 1970, embodied the government's proposals for assistance to 54 "intermediate" employment exchange areas not classified as full "development" areas.

Funds allocated to regional assistance more than doubled, from £40 million in 1964/65 to £82 million in 1969/70, and from 1964 to 1970, the number of factories completed was 50% higher than from 1960 to 1964, which helped to reduce unemployment in development areas. In 1970, the unemployment rate in development areas was 1.67 times the national average, compared to 2.21 times in 1964. Although national rates of unemployment were higher in 1970 than in the early 1960s, unemployment rates in the development areas were lower and had not increased for three years. Altogether, the impact of the first Wilson government's regional development policies was such that, according to one historian, the period 1963 to 1970 represented "the most prolonged, most intensive, and most successful attack ever launched on regional problems in Britain."

==== International development ====
A new Ministry of Overseas Development was established, with its greatest success at the time being the introduction of interest-free loans for the poorest countries. The Minister of Overseas Development, Barbara Castle, set a standard in interest relief on loans to developing nations which resulted in changes to the loan policies of many donor countries, "a significant shift in the conduct of rich white nations to poor brown ones". Loans were introduced to developing countries on terms that were more favourable to them than those given by governments of all other developed countries at that time. In addition, Castle was instrumental in setting up an Institute of Development Studies at the University of Sussex to devise ways of tackling global socio-economic inequalities. Overseas aid suffered from the austerity measures introduced by the first Wilson government in its last few years in office, with British aid as a percentage of GNP falling from 0.53% in 1964 to 0.39% in 1969.

==== Taxation ====
Wilson's government made a variety of changes to the tax system. Largely under the influence of the Hungarian-born economists Nicholas Kaldor and Thomas Balogh, an idiosyncratic Selective Employment Tax (SET) was introduced that was designed to tax employment in the service sectors while subsidising employment in manufacturing. (The rationale proposed by its economist authors derived largely from claims about potential economies of scale and technological progress, but Wilson in his memoirs stressed the tax's revenue-raising potential.) The SET did not long survive the return of a Conservative government. Of longer-term significance, capital gains tax (CGT) was introduced across the UK on 6 April 1965.

Various changes were also made to the tax system which benefited workers on low and middle incomes. Married couples with low incomes benefited from the increases in the single personal allowance and marriage allowance. In 1965, the regressive allowance for national insurance contributions was abolished and the single personal allowance, marriage allowance and wife's earned income relief were increased. These allowances were further increased in the tax years 1969–70 and 1970–71. Increases in the age exemption and dependant relative's income limits benefited the low-income elderly. In 1967, new tax concessions were introduced for widows.

Increases were made in some of the minor allowances in the 1969 Finance Act, notably the additional personal allowance, the age exemption and age relief and the dependent relative limit. Apart from the age relief, further adjustments in these concessions were implemented in 1970.

1968 saw the introduction of aggregation of the investment income of unmarried minors with the income of their parents. According to Michael Meacher, this change put an end to a previous inequity whereby two families, in otherwise identical circumstances, paid differing amounts of tax "simply because in one case the child possessed property transferred to it by a grandparent, while in the other case the grandparent's identical property was inherited by the parent."

In the 1969 budget, income tax was abolished for about 1 million of the lowest-paid and reduced for a further 600,000 people, while in the government's last budget (introduced in 1970), two million small taxpayers were exempted from paying any income tax altogether.

==== Liberal reforms ====
A wide range of liberal measures were introduced during Wilson's time in office. The Matrimonial Proceedings and Property Act 1970 made provision for the welfare of children whose parents were about to divorce or be judicially separated, with courts (for instance) granted wide powers to order financial provision for children in the form of maintenance payments made by either parent. This legislation allowed courts to order provision for either spouse and recognised the contribution to the joint home made during marriage. That same year, spouses were given an equal share of household assets following divorce via the Matrimonial Property Act. The Race Relations Act 1968 was also extended in 1968 and in 1970 the Equal Pay Act 1970 was passed. Another important reform, the Welsh Language Act 1967, granted 'equal validity' to the declining Welsh language and encouraged its revival. Government expenditure was also increased on both sport and the arts. The Mines and Quarries (Tips) Act 1969, passed in response to the Aberfan disaster, made provision for preventing disused tips from endangering members of the public. In 1967, corporal punishment in borstals and prisons was abolished. seven regional associations were established to develop the arts, and government expenditure on cultural activities rose from £7.7 million in 1964/64 to £15.3 million in 1968/69. A Criminal Injuries Compensation Board was also set up, which had paid out over £2 million to victims of criminal violence by 1968.

The Commons Registration Act 1965 provided for the registration of all common land and village greens, whilst under the Countryside Act 1968, local authorities could provide facilities "for enjoyment of such lands to which the public has access". The Family Provision Act 1966 amended a series of pre-existing estate laws mainly related to persons who died intestate. The legislation increased the amount that could be paid to surviving spouses if a will had not been left, and also expanded upon the jurisdiction of county courts, which were given the jurisdiction of high courts under certain circumstances when handling matters of estate. The rights of adopted children were also improved with certain wording changed in the Inheritance (Family Provision) Act 1938 to bestow upon them the same rights as natural-born children. In 1968, the Nurseries and Child-Minders Regulation Act 1948 was updated to include more categories of childminders. A year later, the Family Law Reform Act 1969 was passed, which allowed people born outside marriage to inherit on the intestacy of either parent. In 1967, homosexuality was partially decriminalised (in England & Wales only) by the passage of the Sexual Offences Act. The Public Records Act 1967 also introduced a thirty-year rule for access to public records, replacing a previous fifty-year rule.

==== Industrial relations ====
Wilson made periodic attempts to mitigate inflation, largely through wage-price controls—better known in Britain as "prices and incomes policy". (As with indicative planning, such controls—though now generally out of favour—were widely adopted at that time by governments of different ideological complexions, including the Nixon administration in the United States.) Partly as a result of this reliance, the government tended to find itself repeatedly injected into major industrial disputes, with late-night "beer and sandwiches at Number Ten" an almost routine culmination to such episodes. Among the most damaging of the numerous strikes during Wilson's periods in office was a six-week stoppage by the National Union of Seamen, beginning shortly after Wilson's re-election in 1966, and conducted, he claimed, by "politically motivated men".

With public frustration over strikes mounting, Wilson's government in 1969 proposed a series of changes to the legal basis for industrial relations (labour law), which were outlined in a White Paper "In Place of Strife" put forward by the Employment Secretary Barbara Castle. Following a confrontation with the Trades Union Congress, which strongly opposed the proposals, and internal dissent from Home Secretary James Callaghan, the government substantially backed-down from its intentions. The Heath government (1970–1974) introduced the Industrial Relations Act 1971 with many of the same ideas, but this was largely repealed by the post-1974 Labour government. Some elements of these changes were subsequently to be enacted (in modified form) during the premiership of Margaret Thatcher.

==== Northern Ireland ====
Wilson's first premiership was marked by the emerging conflict in Northern Ireland: Like all British governments since the partition of Ireland in 1921, Harold Wilson's Labour government preferred not to intervene in the affairs of Northern Ireland. However in August 1969, escalating sectarian violence between the province's Protestant and Catholic communities, gave the Government of Northern Ireland little choice but to ask the British government to intervene directly and send in troops, and it was the home secretary James Callaghan, who took the decision to deploy British Army troops in the province. In return Wilson and Callaghan demanded that various reforms be implemented in the province, such as the phasing out of the Protestant paramilitary B-Specials, and their replacement by the Ulster Defence Regiment, which was open to Catholic recruits, and various reforms to reduce discrimination against Catholics, such as reforms to the voting franchise, and a reform of local government boundaries and housing allocations. Although the troops were initially welcomed by Northern Ireland's Catholics, by early 1970 this had soured, and the Provisional IRA emerged, and embarked on what became a decades long violent campaign during what became known as The Troubles.

==== Record on income distribution ====
Despite the economic difficulties faced by the first Wilson government, it succeeded in maintaining low levels of unemployment and inflation during its time in office. Unemployment was kept below 2.7%, and inflation for much of the 1960s remained below 4%. Living standards generally improved, while public spending on housing, social security, transport, research, education and health went up by an average of more than 6% between 1964 and 1970. The average household grew steadily richer, with the number of cars in the United Kingdom rising from one to every 6.4 persons to one for every five persons in 1968, representing a net increase of three million cars on the road. The rise in the standard of living was also characterised by increased ownership of various consumer durables from 1964 to 1969, as demonstrated by television sets (from 88% to 90%), refrigerators (from 39% to 59%), and washing machines (from 54% to 64%).

By 1970, income in Britain was more equally distributed than in 1964, mainly because of increases in cash benefits, including family allowances.

According to the historian, Dominic Sandbrook:

In its commitment to social services and public welfare, the Wilson government put together a record unmatched by any subsequent administration, and the mid-sixties are justifiably seen as the 'golden age' of the welfare state.

As noted by Ben Pimlott, the gap between those on lowest incomes and the rest of the population "had been significantly reduced" under Wilson's first government. The first Wilson government thus saw the distribution of income became more equal, while big reductions in poverty took place. These achievements were mainly brought about by several increases in social welfare benefits, such as supplementary benefit, pensions and family allowances, the latter of which were doubled between 1964 and 1970 (although most of the increase in family allowances did not come about until 1968). A new system of rate rebates was introduced, which benefited one million households by the end of the 1960s. Increases in national insurance benefits in 1965, 1967, 1968 and 1969 ensured that those dependent on state benefits saw their disposable incomes rise faster than manual wage earners, while income differentials between lower-income and higher-income workers were marginally narrowed. Greater progressivity was introduced in the tax system, with greater emphasis on direct (income-based) as opposed to indirect (typically expenditure-based) taxation as a means of raising revenue, with the amount raised by the former increasing twice as much as that of the latter. Also, despite an increase in unemployment, the poor improved their share of the national income while that of the rich was slightly reduced. Despite various cutbacks after 1966, expenditure on services such as education and health was still much higher as a proportion of national wealth than in 1964. In addition, by raising taxes to pay their reforms, the government paid careful attention to the principle of redistribution, with disposable incomes rising for the lowest paid while falling amongst the wealthiest during its time in office.

Between 1964 and 1968, benefits in kind were significantly progressive, in that over the period those in the lower half of the income scale benefited more than those in the upper half. On average those receiving state benefits benefited more in terms of increases in real disposable income than the average manual worker or salaried employee between 1964 and 1969. From 1964 to 1969, low-wage earners did substantially better than other sections of the population. In 1969, a married couple with two children were 11.5% per cent richer in real terms, while for a couple with three children, the corresponding increase was 14.5%, and for a family with four children, 16.5%. From 1965 to 1968, the income of single pensioner households as a percentage of other one adult households rose from 48.9% to 52.5%. For two pensioner households, the equivalent increase was from 46.8% to 48.2%. In addition, mainly as a result of big increases in cash benefits, unemployed persons and large families gained more in terms of real disposable income than the rest of the population during Wilson's time in office.

As noted by Paul Whiteley, pensions, sickness, unemployment, and supplementary benefits went up more in real terms under the First Wilson Government than under the preceding Conservative administration:

"To compare the Conservative period of office with the Labour period, we can use the changes in benefits per year as a rough estimate of comparative performance. For the Conservatives and Labour respectively increases in supplementary benefits per year were 3.5 and 5.2 percentage points, for sickness and unemployment benefits 5.8 and 30.6 percentage points, for pensions 3.8 and 4.6, and for family allowances −1.2 and −2.6. Thus the poor, the retired, the sick and the unemployed did better in real terms under Labour than they did under Conservatives, and families did worse."

Between 1964 and 1968, cash benefits rose as a percentage of income for all households but more so for poorer than for wealthier households. As noted by the economist Michael Stewart,

"it seems indisputable that the high priority the Labour Government gave to expenditure on education and the health service had a favourable effect on income distribution."

For a family with two children in the income range £676 to £816 per annum, cash benefits rose from 4% of income in 1964 to 22% in 1968, compared with a change from 1% to 2% for a similar family in the income range £2,122 to £2,566 over the same period. For benefits in kind the changes over the same period for similar families were from 21% to 29% for lower-income families and from 9% to 10% for higher-income families. When taking into account all benefits, taxes and Government expenditures on social services, the first Wilson government succeeded in bringing about a reduction in income inequality. As noted by the historian Kenneth O. Morgan,

"In the long term, therefore, fortified by increases in supplementary and other benefits under the Crossman regime in 1968–70, the welfare state had made some impact, almost by inadvertence, on social inequality and the maldistribution of real income".

Public expenditure as a percentage of GDP rose significantly under the 1964–1970 Labour government, from 34% in 1964–65 to nearly 38% of GDP by 1969–70, whilst expenditure on social services rose from 16% of national income in 1964 to 23% by 1970. These measures had a major impact on the living standards of low-income Britons, with disposable incomes rising faster for low-income groups than for high-income groups during the 1960s. When measuring disposable income after taxation but including benefits, the total disposable income of those on the highest incomes fell by 33%, whilst the total disposable income of those on the lowest incomes rose by 104%. As noted by one historian, "the net effect of Labour's financial policies was indeed to make the rich poorer and the poor richer".

=== Foreign affairs ===
==== United States ====
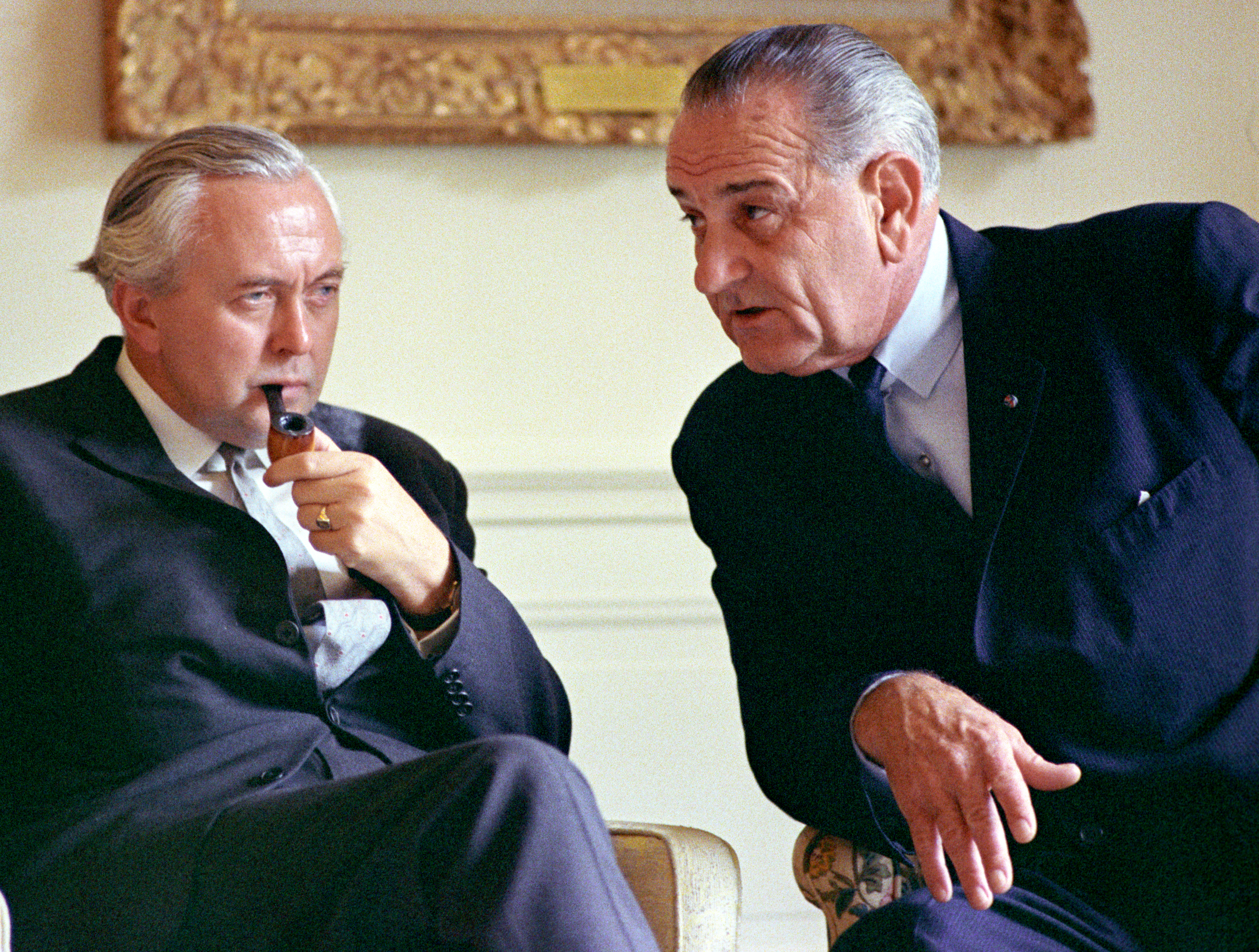
Wilson with US President Lyndon B. Johnson at the White House in 1966

Wilson believed in a strong "Special Relationship" with the United States and wanted to highlight his dealings with the White House to strengthen his prestige as a statesman. President Lyndon B. Johnson disliked Wilson and ignored any "special" relationship. The Vietnam War was a sore point. Johnson needed and asked for help to maintain American prestige. Wilson offered lukewarm verbal support and no military aid. Wilson's policy angered the left wing of his Labour Party, who opposed the Vietnam War. Wilson and Johnson also differed sharply on British economic weakness and its declining status as a world power. Historian Jonathan Colman concludes it made for the most unsatisfactory "special" relationship in the 20th century. The only point of total agreement was that both Johnson and Wilson emphatically supported Israel in the 1967 Six-Day War.

==== Europe ====
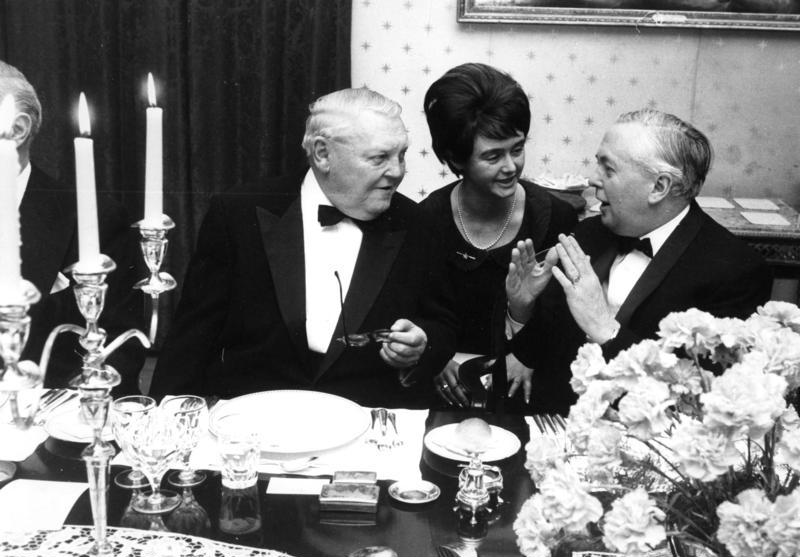
Wilson with West German Chancellor Ludwig Erhard in 1965

Among the more challenging political dilemmas Wilson faced was the issue of British membership of the European Community, the forerunner of the present European Union. An entry attempt was vetoed in 1963 by French President Charles de Gaulle. The Labour Party in Opposition had been divided on the issue, with Hugh Gaitskell having come out in 1962 in opposition to Britain joining the European Community. After initial hesitation, Wilson's Government in May 1967 lodged the UK's second application to join the European Community. It was vetoed by de Gaulle in November 1967. After De Gaulle lost power, Conservative prime minister Edward Heath negotiated Britain's admission to the EC in 1973.

Wilson in opposition showed political ingenuity in devising a position that both sides of the party could agree on, opposing the terms negotiated by Heath but not membership in principle. Labour's 1974 manifesto included a pledge to renegotiate terms for Britain's membership and then hold a referendum on whether to stay in the EC on the new terms. This was a constitutional procedure without precedent in British history.

Following Wilson's return to power, the renegotiations with Britain's fellow EC members were carried out by Wilson himself in tandem with Foreign Secretary James Callaghan, and they toured the capital cities of Europe meeting their European counterparts. The discussions focused primarily on Britain's net budgetary contribution to the EC. As a small agricultural producer heavily dependent on imports, Britain suffered doubly from the dominance of:

(i) agricultural spending in the EC budget,
(ii) agricultural import taxes as a source of EC revenues.

During the renegotiations, other EEC members conceded, as a partial offset, the establishment of a significant European Regional Development Fund (ERDF), from which it was agreed that Britain would be a major net beneficiary.

In the subsequent referendum campaign, rather than the normal British tradition of "collective responsibility", under which the government takes a policy position which all cabinet members are required to support publicly, members of the Government were free to present their views on either side of the question. The electorate voted on 5 June 1975 to continue membership, by a substantial majority.

==== Asia ====
American military involvement in Vietnam escalated continuously from 1964 to 1968 and President Lyndon B. Johnson brought pressure to bear for at least a token involvement of British military units. Wilson consistently avoided any commitment of British forces, giving as reasons British military commitments to the Malayan Emergency and British co-chairmanship of the 1954 Geneva Conference.

His government offered some rhetorical support for the US position (most prominently in the defence offered by the Foreign Secretary Michael Stewart in a much-publicised "teach-in" or debate on Vietnam). On at least one occasion the British government made an unsuccessful effort to mediate in the conflict, with Wilson discussing peace proposals with Alexei Kosygin, the Chairman of the USSR Council of Ministers. On 28 June 1966 Wilson 'dissociated' his Government from American bombing of the cities of Hanoi and Haiphong. In his memoirs, Wilson writes of "selling LBJ a bum steer", a reference to Johnson's Texas roots, which conjured up images of cattle and cowboys in British minds.

Part of the price paid by Wilson after talks with President Johnson in June 1967 for US assistance with the UK economy was his agreement to maintain a military presence East of Suez. In July 1967 Defence Secretary Denis Healey announced that Britain would abandon her mainland bases East of Suez by 1977, although airmobile forces would be retained which could if necessary be deployed in the region. Shortly afterwards, in January 1968, Wilson accelerated the proposed timetable for this withdrawal, so that British forces were to be withdrawn from Singapore, Malaysia, and the Persian Gulf by the end of 1971.

Wilson was known for his strongly pro-Israel views. He was a particular friend of Israeli Premier Golda Meir, though her tenure largely coincided with Wilson's 1970–1974 hiatus. Another associate was West German Chancellor Willy Brandt; all three were members of the Socialist International.

==== Africa ====
The British "retreat from Empire" had made headway by 1964 and was to continue during Wilson's administration. Southern Rhodesia was not granted independence, principally because Wilson refused to grant independence to the white minority government headed by Rhodesian prime minister Ian Smith which was not willing to extend unqualified voting rights to the native African population. Smith's defiant response was a Unilateral Declaration of Independence, on 11 November 1965. Wilson's immediate recourse was to the United Nations, and in 1965, the Security Council imposed sanctions, which were to last until official independence in 1979. This involved British warships blockading the port of Beira to try to cause economic collapse in Rhodesia. Wilson was applauded by most nations for taking a firm stand on the issue (and none extended diplomatic recognition to the Smith régime). A number of nations did not join in with sanctions, undermining their efficiency. Certain sections of public opinion started to question their efficacy, and to demand the toppling of the régime by force. Wilson declined to intervene in Rhodesia with military force, believing the British population would not support such action against their "kith and kin". The two leaders met for discussions aboard British warships, Tiger in 1966 and Fearless in 1968. Smith subsequently attacked Wilson in his memoirs, accusing him of delaying tactics during negotiations and alleging duplicity; Wilson responded in kind, questioning Smith's good faith and suggesting that Smith had moved the goal-posts whenever a settlement appeared in sight. The matter was still unresolved at the time of Wilson's resignation in 1976. Wilson had a good relationship with Siaka Stevens of Sierra Leone; the two leaders attempted to work together to find a solution to the question of Biafra in Nigeria. But despite this, the British government was actively sending arms, munitions and other equipment to the Nigerian military junta, and consistently denied any wrongdoing by the government of Nigeria: Nigerian writer Chinua Achebe wrote that this may have cost him his position.

=== Electoral defeat and resignation ===
By 1969, the Labour Party was suffering serious electoral reverses, and by the turn of 1970 had lost a total of 16 seats in by-elections since the previous general election.

By 1970, the economy was showing signs of improvement, and by May that year, Labour had overtaken the Conservatives in the opinion polls. Wilson responded to this apparent recovery in his government's popularity by calling a general election, but, to the surprise of most observers, was defeated at the polls by the Conservatives under Heath. Most opinion polls had predicted a Labour win, with a poll six days before the election showing a 12.4% Labour lead. Writing in the aftermath of the election, The Times journalist George Clark wrote that the 1970 contest would be "remembered as the occasion when the people of the United Kingdom hurled the findings of the opinion polls back into the faces of the pollsters and at the voting booths proved them wrong—most of them badly wrong". Heath and the Conservatives had attacked Wilson over the economy. Towards the end of the campaign, bad trade figures for May added weight to Heath's campaign and he claimed that a Labour victory would result in a further devaluation. Wilson considered Heath's claims "irresponsible" and "damaging to the nation". Ultimately, however, the election saw Labour's vote share fall to its lowest since 1935. Several prominent Labour figures lost their seats, notably George Brown who was still Deputy Leader of the Labour Party.

== Second premiership (1974–1976) ==
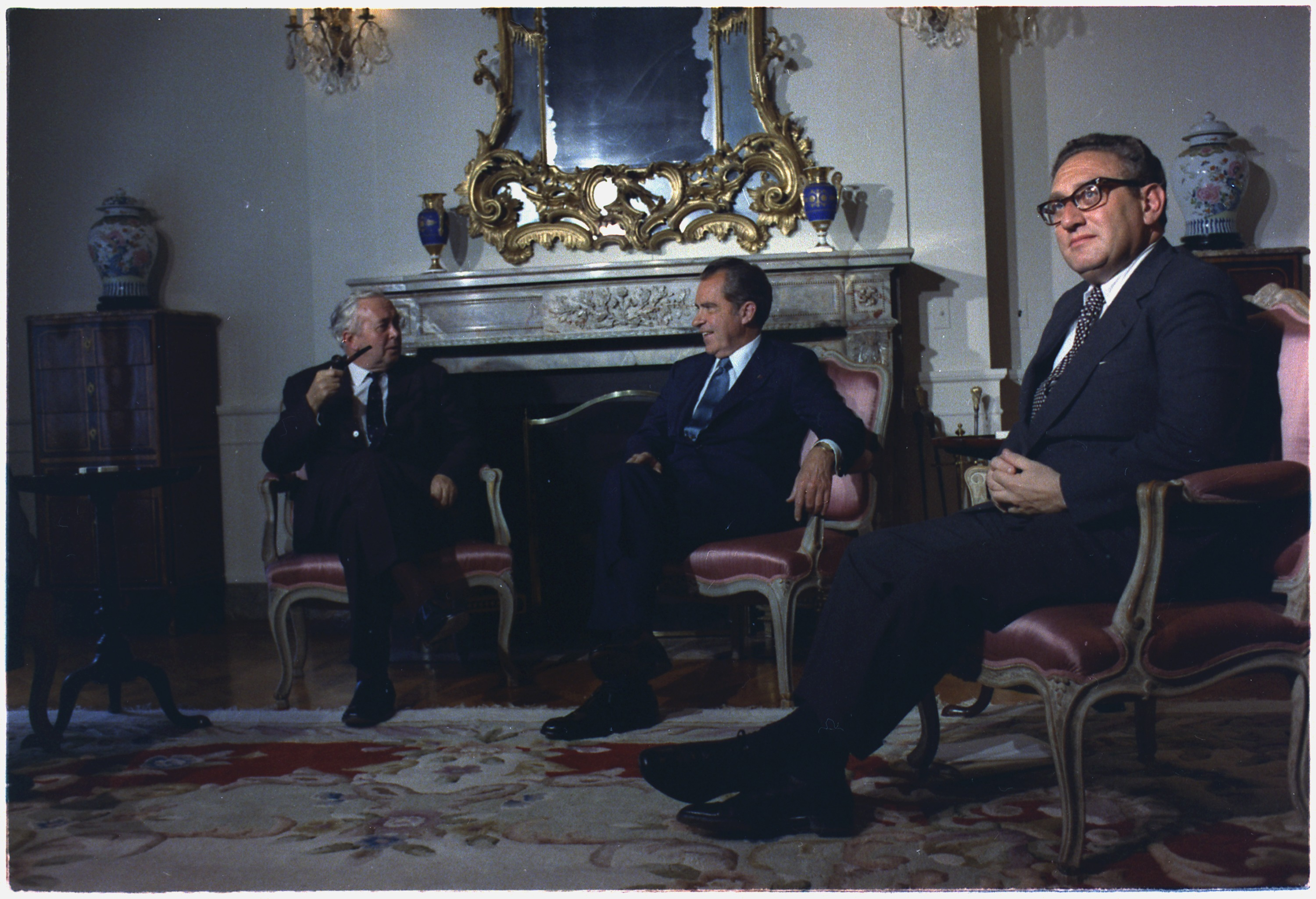
Harold Wilson with US President Richard Nixon and Henry Kissinger in 1974

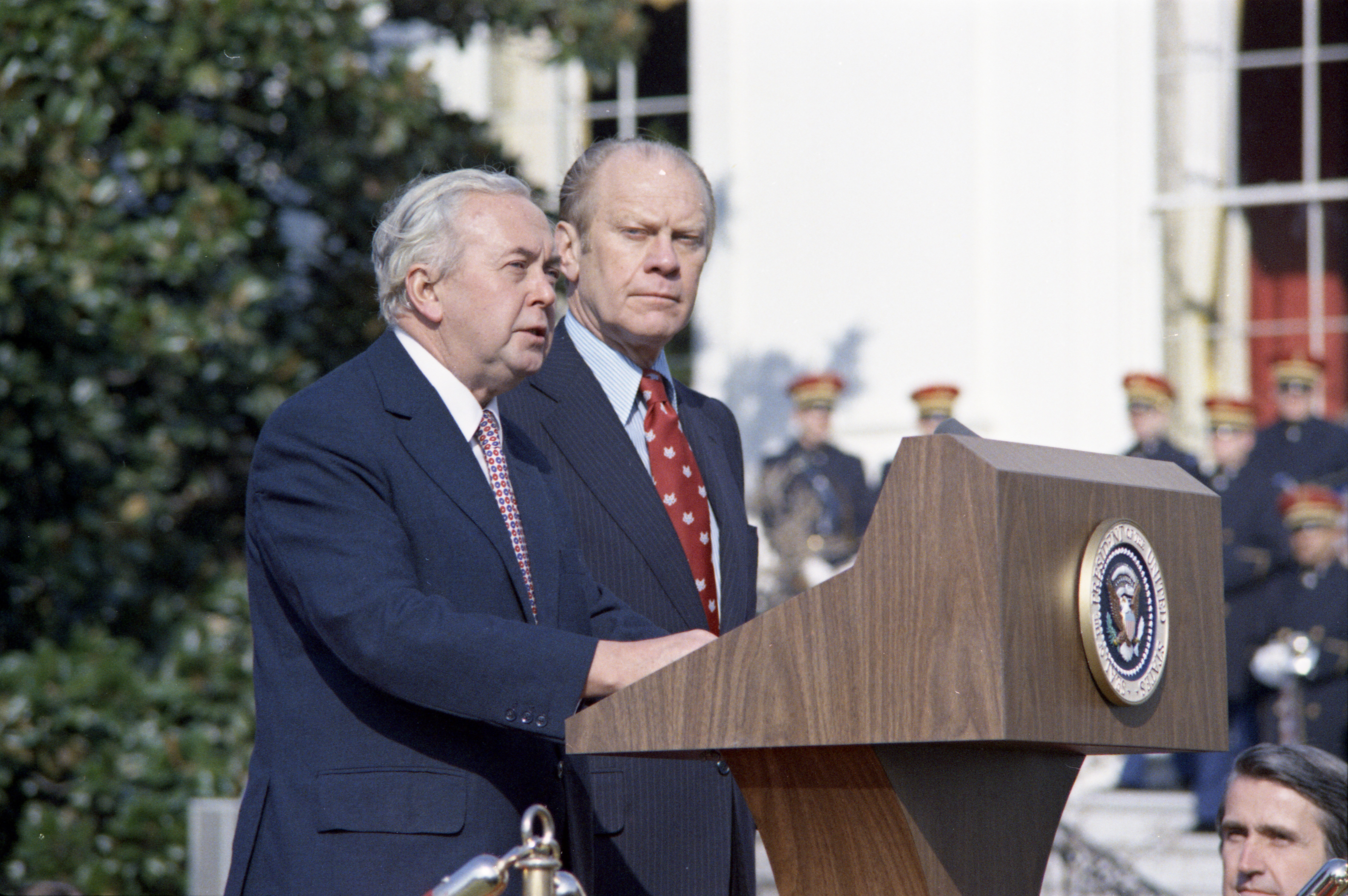
Harold Wilson with US President Gerald Ford in 1975, during his second term as prime minister

Labour won more seats (though fewer votes) than the Conservative Party in the general election in February 1974, which resulted in a hung parliament. As Heath was unable to persuade the Liberals to form a coalition, Wilson returned to 10 Downing Street on 4 March 1974 as prime minister of a minority Labour Government. He gained a three-seat majority in another election later that year, on 10 October 1974.

=== 1975 European referendum ===
One of the key issues addressed during his second period in office was the referendum on British membership of the European Community (EC) which took place in June 1975: Labour had pledged in its February 1974 manifesto to renegotiate the terms of British accession to the EC, and then to consult the public in a referendum on whether Britain should stay in on the new terms. Although the government recommended a vote in favour of continued membership, the cabinet was split on the issue, and Ministers were allowed to campaign on different sides of the question. The referendum resulted in a near two-to-one majority in favour of Britain remaining in the EC.

=== Domestic social and economic affairs ===
The Second Wilson Government made a major commitment to the expansion of the British welfare state, with increased spending on education, health, and housing rents. To pay for it, it imposed controls and raised taxes on the rich. In 1974, three weeks after forming a new government, Wilson's new chancellor Denis Healey partially reversed the 1971 reduction in the top rate of tax from 90% to 75%, increasing it to 83% in his first budget, which came into law in April 1974. This applied to incomes over £20,000 (equivalent to £189,615 in 2025), and combined with a 15% surcharge on 'unearned' income (investments and dividends) could add up to a 98% marginal rate of personal income tax. In 1974, as many as 750,000 people were liable to pay the top rate of income tax.

Various reforms were carried out during Wilson's final premiership. The Rent Act 1974 extended security of tenure to tenants of furnished properties, allowed access to rent tribunals, and extended the scope of the rent allowance scheme (as noted by one study) "to benefit most tenants of privately owned, ready-furnished accommodation who have shown that they are making their homes there and who have difficulties in affording their rent." In October 1974, "Intermediate Treatment" (which included recreational, educational, or cultural activities to which children and young persons are directed in a Supervision Order) became available to juvenile courts in all areas of England and Wales. That same month, the Christmas bonus "was extended to include widows, the chronically sick, and the disabled, where these people were already receiving social security benefits."

Circular 4/74 (1974) renewed pressure for moves towards comprehensive education (progress of which had stalled under the Heath ministry), while the industrial relations legislation passed under Edward Heath was repealed. The Health and Safety at Work etc. Act 1974 set up a Health and Safety Commission and a Health and Safety Executive; it gave a legal framework for health and safety at work.

The Housing Finance Act 1974 increased aid to local authorities for slum clearance, introduced a system of "fair rents" in public and private sector unfurnished accommodation, and introduced rent rebates for council tenants. The Housing Act 1974 improved the Renovation Grants scheme, provided increased levels of aid to housing associations (which emerged as a popular alternative to council housing for people seeking to rent a home), and extended the role of the Housing Corporation. The Community Land Act 1975 allowed for the taking into public control of development land, while the Child Benefits Act 1975 introduced an extra payment for single parents. In June 1975, the government issued the first series of National Savings Retirement Certificates.

The Employment Protection Act 1975 set up the Advisory, Conciliation and Arbitration Service (ACAS) to arbitrate in industrial disputes, enlarged the rights of employees and trade unions, extended the redundancy payments scheme, and provided redress against unfair dismissal. The legislation also provided for paid maternity leave and outlawed dismissal for pregnancy, obliged employers to pay their workers a minimum guaranteed payment "if they are laid off through no fault of their own," and payment to employees by employers at guaranteed rates if they are not provided with work or suitable alternative work during their normal working day, together with payment at normal rates to employees who are suspended (as noted by one study) “on medical grounds in accordance with a statutory requirement or code of practice-up to a maximum of 26 weeks' suspension.” There were also special provisions to enable employees (in cases of employer insolvency) to obtain payment of money that was owed to them, while the Act also laid down the duty of employers (as noted by one study) "to allow reasonable time off for independent trade union officials to carry out their official duties or to undergo training, for members of independent trade unions to take part in their union activities, and for employees who are made redundant for the purpose of looking for a new job or making arrangements for training."

The Social Security Pensions Act 1975 provided for equal access by men and women to employers' pension schemes and also included a home responsibilities provision ensuring that parents and those looking after elderly dependents could retain their pension rights in spite of employment breaks. As a means of combating sex discrimination within the social security system, the act provided that in future married women would receive the same level of personal sickness or unemployment benefit. In February 1975 the Supplementary Benefits Commission "introduced certain changes in the payment of rents in line with the recommendations of the Finer Report on One-Parent Families." The Social Security Act 1975 introduced a maternity allowance fund, while the Sex Discrimination Act 1975 set up an Equal Opportunities Commission and outlawed gender discrimination (both indirect and direct), with women given the right in principle to equal access to jobs and equal treatment at work with men.

Despite its achievements in social policy, Wilson's government came under scrutiny in 1975 for the rise in the unemployment rate, with the total number of Britons out of work passing one million by that April.

Wilson's second government came into office at a troubled time for the British economy, due to a global recession and stagflation, in large part this was due to the 1973 oil crisis, and also the preceding government's inflationary attempt to boost growth. In order to deal with inflation (which peaked at 26% in 1975) the government negotiated a 'social contract' with the Trades Union Congress to implement a voluntary incomes policy, in which pay rises were held down to limits set by the government. This policy operated with reasonable success for the next few years, and inflation fell to single figures by 1978. By 1976 the recession had ended and economic recovery began, by 1978/79 living standards recovered to the level they had been in 1973/74. The Labour governments of the 1970s did, however, manage to protect the living standards of many people from the worst effects of the recession and high inflation, with pensions increasing by 20% in real terms between 1974 and 1979, while measures such as rent and price controls and food and transport subsidies mitigated the adverse impact on the living standards of many more people.

The government's industrial policy was greatly influenced by the economist Stuart Holland and the Secretary of State for Industry Tony Benn. The centrepiece of the policy was the National Enterprise Board (NEB) which was established in 1975 and was intended to channel public investment into industry, in return for taking a holding of equity in private companies. The NEB was intended to extend public ownership of the economy as well as investing in the regeneration of industry, although it had some successes in that aim, in practice one of its main activities became that of propping up failing companies such as British Leyland. The government also continued its policy of encouraging regional development by increasing Regional Employment Premiums, which had first been established in 1967.

=== Northern Ireland ===
Wilson's earlier government had witnessed the outbreak of The Troubles in Northern Ireland. In response to a request from the Government of Northern Ireland, Wilson agreed to deploy the British Army in August 1969 to restore the peace.

While out of office in late 1971, Wilson had formulated a 16-point, 15-year programme that was designed to pave the way for the unification of Ireland. The proposal was not adopted by the then Heath government.

In May 1974, when back in office as leader of a minority government, Wilson condemned the Unionist-controlled Ulster Workers' Council strike as a "sectarian strike". He refused to pressure a reluctant British Army to face down the Ulster loyalist paramilitaries who were intimidating utility workers. In a televised speech later, he referred to the loyalist strikers and their supporters as "spongers" who expected Britain to pay for their lifestyles. The strike was eventually successful in breaking the power-sharing Northern Ireland executive.

On 11 September 2008, BBC Radio 4's Document programme claimed to have unearthed a secret plan—codenamed Doomsday—which proposed to cut all of the United Kingdom's constitutional ties with Northern Ireland and transform the province into an independent dominion. Document went on to claim that the Doomsday plan was devised mainly by Wilson and was kept a closely guarded secret. The plan then allegedly lost momentum, due in part, it was claimed, to warnings made by the Foreign Secretary, James Callaghan, and the Irish Minister for Foreign Affairs Garret FitzGerald who admitted the 12,000-strong Irish Army would be unable to deal with a civil war. Later, Callaghan spoke and wrote despondently about the prospect for a British-derived solution to the Northern Ireland issue, supporting a similar plan to push Northern Ireland towards independent status.

In 1975, Wilson secretly offered Libya's dictator Muammar Gaddafi £14 million to stop arming the Provisional Irish Republican Army, but Gaddafi demanded a far greater sum of money. This offer did not become publicly known until 2009.

=== Resignation ===
When Wilson entered office for the second time, he had privately admitted that he had lost his enthusiasm for the role, telling a close adviser in 1974 that "I have been around this racetrack so often that I cannot generate any more enthusiasm for jumping any more hurdles." On 16 March 1976, Wilson resigned as prime minister, taking effect on 5 April. He claimed that he had always planned on resigning at the age of 60 and that he was physically and mentally exhausted. As early as the late 1960s he had been telling intimates, like his doctor Sir Joseph Stone (later Lord Stone of Hendon), that he did not intend to serve more than eight or nine years as prime minister.

Roy Jenkins has suggested that Wilson may have been motivated partly by the distaste for politics felt by his loyal and long-suffering wife, Mary. His doctor had detected problems which would later be diagnosed as colon cancer, and Wilson had begun drinking brandy during the day to cope with stress. By 1976 he might already have been aware of the first stages of early-onset Alzheimer's disease, which was to cause his formerly excellent memory and his powers of concentration to fail dramatically.

Wilson's Resignation Honours included many businessmen and celebrities, along with his political supporters. His choice of appointments caused lasting damage to his reputation, worsened by the suggestion that the first draft of the list had been written by his political secretary Marcia Williams on lavender notepaper (it became known as the "Lavender List"). Roy Jenkins noted that Wilson's retirement "was disfigured by his, at best, eccentric resignation honours list, which gave peerages or knighthoods to some adventurous business gentlemen, several of whom were close neither to him nor to the Labour Party." Some of those whom Wilson honoured included Lord Kagan, the inventor of Gannex (Wilson's preferred raincoat), who was eventually imprisoned for fraud, and Sir Eric Miller, who later committed suicide while under police investigation for corruption.

The Labour Party held an election to replace Wilson as leader of the Party, and thus prime minister. Six candidates stood in the first ballot; in order of votes they were: Michael Foot, James Callaghan, Roy Jenkins, Tony Benn, Denis Healey and Anthony Crosland. In the third ballot, on 5 April, Callaghan defeated Foot in a parliamentary vote of 176 to 137, and served as prime minister until May 1979.

As Wilson wished to remain an MP after leaving office, he was not immediately given the peerage customarily offered to retired prime ministers, but instead was created a Knight Companion of the Garter. He fought one last election in 1979 in which he was returned as a backbench MP for Huyton. Following his departure from the House of Commons before the 1983 general election, after 38 years of service, he was granted a life peerage as Baron Wilson of Rievaulx, of Kirklees in the County of West Yorkshire, after Rievaulx Abbey, in the north of his native Yorkshire; the Kirklees refers to his home address of Huddersfield, and is not part of his title.

== Notes ==
British premierships
Preceded by Douglas-Home	1st Wilson premiership 1964–1970	Succeeded by Heath
Preceded by Heath	2nd Wilson premiership 1974–1976	Succeeded by Callaghan
