= The Lavender List =

2006 British political TV program

- Genre: Docudrama
- Written by: Francis Wheen
- Starring: Kenneth Cranham; Gina McKee; Celia Imrie; Neil Dudgeon; Dominic Rowan
- Country of origin: United Kingdom

Original release
- Network: BBC Four
- Release: March 1, 2006

The Lavender List is a docudrama originally broadcast on BBC Four on 1 March 2006. It chronicles the events that led to the drafting of the so-called "Lavender List", a satirical name given to Harold Wilson's controversial 1976 resignation honours.

== Cast ==
- Kenneth Cranham as Harold Wilson
- Gina McKee as Marcia Williams
- Celia Imrie as Mary Wilson
- Neil Dudgeon as Joe Haines
- Dominic Rowan as Bernard Donoughue

== Production ==
The docudrama was written by journalist Francis Wheen, deputy editor of the satirical magazine Private Eye. Wheen said that it was based on the political diaries of two members of Wilson's cabinet: press secretary Joe Haines and director of policy Bernard Donoughue. It starred Kenneth Cranham as Wilson and Gina McKee as Marcia Williams, the head of Wilson's political office.

== The list ==
The list itself caused controversy as some of the recipients were wealthy businessmen whose principles were considered antithetical to those held by the Labour Party. One businessman on the list, Lord Kagan, was a friend of Wilson's. He was convicted of fraud in 1980. Another, Sir Eric Miller, committed suicide while under investigation for the same crime in 1977. Lew Grade and James Goldsmith, who had previously given financial assistance to Williams, also featured.

The name of the list originated in a claim made by Haines that the original draft had been written on lavender-coloured notepaper. No documentary evidence has been proffered to support this claim, and Wilson and Williams denied it.

== Reception ==
Victor Lewis-Smith reviewed the production positively in the Evening Standard. Other reviews were critical, and drew negative responses from some of those depicted in it. Haines noted what he considered 54 inaccuracies in the production.

The BBC paid Williams £75,000 in damages for claiming that she conducted an adulterous affair with Wilson, and that she exercised undue influence over the compilation of the list. In an out-of-court settlement, the BBC also agreed to pay an estimated £200,000 in costs and promised never to rebroadcast the film.
