= Joe Haines (journalist) =

British journalist (1928–2025)

Downing Street Press Secretary
- In office 1974–1976
- Prime Minister: Harold Wilson
- Preceded by: Robin Haydon
- Succeeded by: Tom McCaffrey
- In office 1969–1970
- Prime Minister: Harold Wilson
- Preceded by: Trevor Lloyd-Hughes
- Succeeded by: Donald Maitland

Personal details
- Born: Joseph Thomas William Haines; 29 January 1928 Rotherhithe, London, England
- Died: 19 February 2025 (aged 97) Royal Tunbridge Wells, Kent, England
- Party: Labour
- Occupation: Press secretary, journalist

Joseph Thomas William Haines (29 January 1928 – 19 February 2025) was a British journalist and press secretary to Labour Party leader and Prime Minister Harold Wilson.

== Early life and career ==
Born in Rotherhithe, then an impoverished area of London with substandard housing conditions, Haines was the youngest child of a dock worker who died when he was two. His mother, a cleaner at a hospital, brought up the family. He joined the Labour Party as a teenager. At 14, he became a copy boy on the Glasgow Bulletin, and then a lobby reporter at Westminster in 1950.

In 1954, Haines became the political correspondent for George Outram & Co. in Glasgow, before moving to Edinburgh around 1960 to work for the Scottish Daily Mail. From 1964 he was employed by the pre-Murdoch Sun, and became Harold Wilson's press secretary in 1969.

== With Harold Wilson ==
In 1974, Wilson had a health scare over a racing heart complaint, but "I told the press, who believed me when I said that Harold had the flu," Haines recalled in 2004. "We had an economic crisis and we had a majority of three", he explained.

In Glimmers of Twilight (2003), Haines said that Wilson's doctor Joseph Stone offered to murder Marcia Falkender, the head of Wilson's political office, after she attempted to blackmail Wilson over an affair they had twenty years earlier. The BBC, in an out-of-court settlement with Falkender, paid her £75,000 after these claims were repeated in The Lavender List, a drama documentary written by Francis Wheen and broadcast in 2006. The allegations relating to Stone were repeated in the BBC's documentary The Secret World of Whitehall (2011).

Not long after Wilson's resignation as Prime Minister, Haines published a book The Politics of Power about his experience of British political life. Attention mainly concentrated on two chapters about Marcia Williams (now Falkender) and her influence. Haines said that Williams' troublesome presence had been the real cause of Wilson's resignation. The Labour MP Brian Sedgemore considered that The Politics of Power was an interesting account, but the chapters about Marcia Williams were the weakest in the book.

In a 2010 interview, Haines said that in the aftermath of the February 1974 general election, Harold Wilson had planned to discredit Liberal leader Jeremy Thorpe by exposing Thorpe's relationship with Norman Scott in the event of the Conservative government reaching an agreement with the Liberals that would have permitted it to remain in power. Around the same time, Haines said that he had turned down a peerage from Wilson in the 1976 Prime Minister's Resignation Honours in part, he said, because he did not wish to be awarded one in a list also consisting of Joe Kagan and Eric Miller, who were suspected of criminal activity at the time.

In 2024, Haines revealed that Wilson had had an affair with Haines' deputy Janet Hewlett-Davies during his final two years as Prime Minister. Hewlett-Davies died aged 85 in October 2023.

== Later career ==
In 1976, Haines joined the Daily Mirror. At the time Robert Maxwell purchased Mirror Group Newspapers on 12 July 1984, Haines told a meeting of his colleagues that their new proprietor "is a crook and a liar – and I can prove it".

Appointed the Mirror Group's political editor shortly after Maxwell's purchase of the Group, he also became a non-executive director of the board, and from 1984 to 1990 he was the Mirror's assistant editor. In 1988, the authorised biography by Haines of Robert Maxwell was published. The Mirror's then owner had commissioned the work to pre-empt a biography by investigative journalist Tom Bower, which Maxwell unsuccessfully attempted to have withdrawn. Haines' biography was generally considered to be encomium and was treated with a mixture of ridicule and strong criticism by the media at the time of its release – The Times referred to it as "notorious". According to Tom Bower, Haines' biography was so flattering Maxwell would give out copies instead of business cards. A report in 2001 by the Trade and Industry Department inspectors into the collapse of Maxwell's business empire found that Haines "had accepted the position [with Maxwell] and ought to have discharged the responsibilities that went with the position. He therefore bears a limited measure of responsibility" for the debacle.

In 1991, a few days after the death from HIV/AIDS of Queen's lead singer Freddie Mercury, the Daily Mirror ran a column authored by Haines in which he criticised the late singer for pursuing "abnormal sexual pleasures", accusing Mercury of "touring the streets seeking rent boys to bugger and share drugs with" and described Mercury's private life as a "revolting tale of depravity, lust and downright wickedness". The article – characterised by others as filled with "rabid homophobia" – prompted an open letter in condemnation from folk singer Lal Waterson, later recorded as a song by her sister Norma as "Reply to Joe Haines".

== Later life and death ==
Haines continued to write opinion pieces into his 90s. He died at his home in Royal Tunbridge Wells, Kent, on 19 February 2025, at the age of 97.

Government offices
Preceded by Trevor Lloyd-Hughes	Downing Street Press Secretary; 1969–1970	Succeeded by Donald Maitland
Preceded by Robin Haydon	Downing Street Press Secretary; 1974–1976	Succeeded by Tom McCaffrey
