= 2022 Prime Minister's Resignation Honours =

2022 Prime Minister's Resignation Honours may refer to:

- 2022 Prime Minister's Resignation Honours (Boris Johnson), resignation honours of Johnson
- 2022 Prime Minister's Resignation Honours (Liz Truss), resignation honours of Truss
