= Baron Ashdown =

Baron Ashdown may refer to:

- Arnold Silverstone, Baron Ashdown (1911–1977), British property developer and life peer
- Paddy Ashdown, Baron Ashdown of Norton-sub-Hamdon (1941–2018), British politician and diplomat
