= Joseph Stone, Baron Stone =

British physician

Joseph Ellis Stone
- Born: 27 May 1903; Llanelli
- Died: 17 June 1986 (aged 83); London
- Relatives: Arnold Silverstone (brother)

Joseph Ellis Stone, Baron Stone (born Silverstone; 27 May 1903 – 17 June 1986) was a British general practitioner, most notably to Harold Wilson.

== Career ==
Stone was born in Llanelli in Wales, and after qualifying as a doctor at Cardiff University and Westminster Hospital Medical School worked as a GP in and around Hendon. He took on a number of patients from Hampstead Garden Suburb, at the time an area popular with left-wing politicians, one of whom was Harold Wilson, who went on to become Prime Minister of the United Kingdom.

During World War II, as a captain in the Royal Army Medical Corps, Stone was in the British Army force that liberated Belsen concentration camp. He became heavily involved as a doctor in the initial army reaction to the situation they found in Belsen, and to the rehabilitation of the prisoners there. He was possibly the first British Jewish doctor to enter Belsen after its liberation. His brother-in-law, Sidney Bernstein, was then commissioned by the British Government to make a documentary about the liberation of Belsen and the concentration camps, which may have been influenced by the letters Stone sent home to his wife, Beryl.

As a peacetime GP, his patients included Lord Longford and Wilson, and when Wilson became prime minister, Stone became his personal physician. During this period in his career he counted a large number of Wilson's Cabinet as his patients. Stone travelled widely with the prime minister, and became a close confidant of his. He remained a family GP in Hendon until a few years before his death, and during his time as Wilson's doctor. Stone also had a General Practice (GP) in Cricklewood Lane, London, for many years serving the local community.

He was knighted in 1970, and later was created a life peer in the 1976 Prime Minister's Resignation Honours, taking the title Baron Stone, of Hendon in Greater London, on 24 June 1976.

== Death and legacy ==
He died in London, having continued to practice medicine until a few years before his death. He and his wife Beryl had two children, Richard and Adrienne. His brother was Arnold Silverstone, later Lord Ashdown. In his memory, the Lord Stone Trust was founded. This was later merged with the Lord Ashdown Charitable Settlement to form the Stone Ashdown Trust.

In 2002, Wilson's former press secretary Joe Haines alleged that Stone had plotted to murder Marcia Falkender in 1975, purportedly to prevent her from revealing that Wilson had an extramarital affair with her; Falkender rejected Haines's allegations as "outrageous". Labour Party politician Bernard Donoughue said in a 2011 documentary that he heard Stone say: "It was in the national interest she be put down". Controversy and lack of clarity about events during this period were also approached by the BBC 4 drama, The Lavender List. Falkender sued the BBC, and won £75,000 and an agreement by the BBC never to show the documentary drama again.
