= Hyatt Regency London – The Churchill =

Hotel in London

Hyatt Regency London - The Churchill
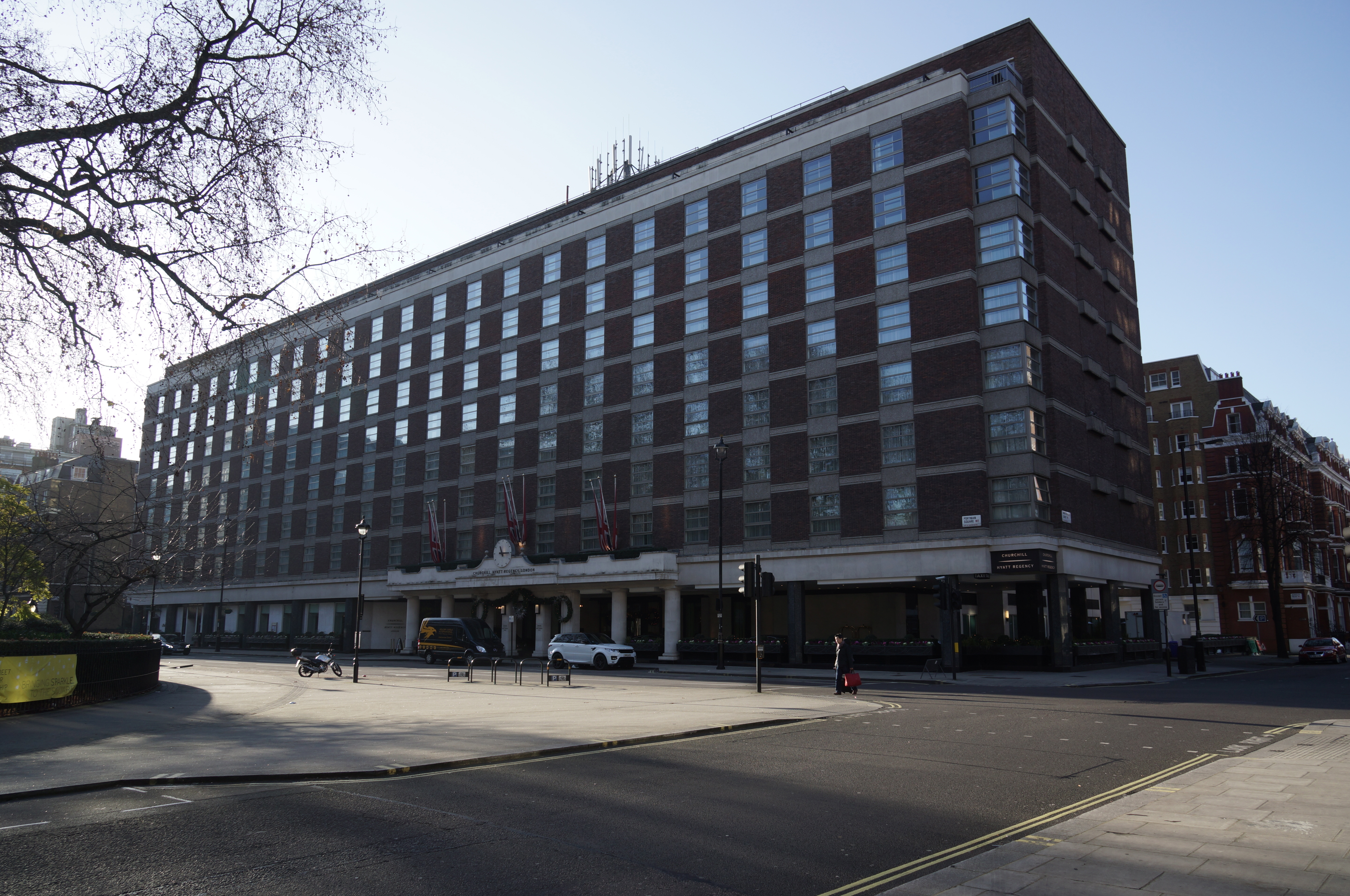
- Hyatt Regency London - The Churchill facing Portman Square, 2014

- Location within Central London

General information
- Location: 30 Portman Square, London, United Kingdom, W1H 7BH
- Coordinates: 51°30′56″N 0°9′25″W
- Opening: 1 May 1970 (49 Years Ago)
- Owner: The Churchill Group Ltd
- Management: Hyatt

Design and construction
- Architects: Stone, Toms & Partners
- Developer: Sir Eric Miller

Other information
- Number of rooms: 440

Website
- Hyatt Regency London - The Churchill

The Hyatt Regency London – The Churchill is a five star hotel located on Portman Square, north of Marble Arch in central London, England. It is owned by The Churchill Group Ltd and is currently operated by Hyatt Hotels Corporation.

== History ==
The hotel is located on Portman Square, part of the 270 acres (1.1 km^{2}) estate granted in 1552 to Sir Henry William Portman, Lord Chief Justice to Henry VIII. The hotel was designed by Stone, Toms & Partners, and opened on 1 May 1970, as The Churchill, operated by Loews Hotels. The name was given by the hotel's developer Sir Eric Miller, in recognition of Sir Winston Churchill.

In 1982 the hotel was purchased by the Hong Kong-registered Park Lane Hotels International. In 1992, it was taken over by the National Bank of Kuwait. In February 1998, the National Bank of Kuwait sold the property for $242 million to a Qatari Consortium, which contracted with Inter-Continental Hotels to manage the hotel as The Churchill Inter-Continental London.

Hyatt Hotels Corporation announced in February 2004 that it would assume full management of The Churchill and from 1 May 2004 the property was known as Hyatt Regency London – The Churchill.

In 2007 Caterer and Hotelkeeper business hospitality magazine awarded the hotel's general manager Michael Gray their 'Hotelier of The Year' for his operational skills and support of the hotel industry.

In 2015 the hotel announced a multimillion-pound refurbishment of bedrooms and suites, led by interior designer DeSallesFlint. The refurbishment was completed in 2016 and included the addition of six new bedrooms, plus three new meeting and event spaces.

Notable personalities hosted at The Churchill include Barack Obama on his 2008 pre-election presidential campaign when he stayed, and met Middle-East envoy Tony Blair, at the hotel.

== Facilities ==
The Churchill, its décor, facilities and in-house outlets reference Sir Winston Churchill and the local area's history.

The main dining restaurant, The Montagu, is named after Elizabeth Montagu, a British social reformer, patron of the arts, literary critic, and writer who helped organize and lead the Blue Stockings Society. Elizabeth Montagu moved into Montagu House at Portman Square in 1781, and lived there until her death in 1800. The restaurant was awarded two AA Rosettes in 2011, and was one of 21 London outlets to receive the 2012 London Afternoon Tea Award from the UK Tea Council.

The hotel's Churchill Bar & Terrace reopened in November 2012 after being closed for refurbishment, the re-launch attended by Randolph Churchill, Winston Churchill's great-grandson. It has an entrance on Portman Square and serves hotel guests and the general public. The interior design references the young Winston Churchill and his wife Clementine, and includes an outdoor terrace leading to Seymour Street. On the terrace is a life-sized bronze sculpture of Sir Winston Churchill, In Conversation, by Lawrence Holofcener.

In 2002 the hotel's former Clementines Restaurant became the independent Italian restaurant, Locanda Locatelli, run by Italian chef Giorgio Locatelli – in 2008 it received one star in the Michelin Guide.

The Churchill Hotel has twelve function rooms on the ground and first floors, including a ballroom, boardrooms and meeting rooms – room names refer to the life and historical background of Sir Winston Churchill. The Chartwell Suite, the main ballroom, named after Sir Winston Churchill's private home Chartwell, in Kent, is the largest of the hotel's function rooms. In 2008 the Suite hosted the 180th Anniversary of The Spectator magazine soon after its former editor Boris Johnson became Mayor of London. Guests attending the function included Joan Collins, Stanley Johnson, Andrew Neil and David Cameron.

== Initiatives and partnerships ==
Since 2008 The Churchill has been the Main Hotel Partner of the Frieze Art Fair which takes place in Regent's Park.

From 2009 to 2011 the hotel collaborated with corporate art project developers Candlestar Ltd., by hosting its contemporary painting, sculpture and photography exhibitions by UK and international artists, and graduates from Camberwell College of Arts, Chelsea College of Art & Design and Wimbledon College of Art.

A further collaboration, begun in January 2012 with the Saatchi Gallery, produced three Saatchi exhibitions at the hotel. The first, 'One Giant Leap', featured a range of works from the Saatchi Gallery's collection; the second, 'Making Waves' coincided with the 2012 Summer Olympics, and featured work with a sporting theme from up-and-coming UK and international artists. In addition, a hotel room, the Saatchi Gallery Suite, was created for hotel guests, featuring contemporary art.

The Churchill also co-sponsors the annual Portman Square Garden Party to raise funds for charities in the Marylebone and Westminster area. For the event the hotel collaborates with Home House, Locanda Locatelli, the Grazing Goat, Selfridges and Seddons. Over the years several charities have received funds raised at the Party. In 2007 the Make-A-Wish Foundation received £5,666. From 2008 to 2010 a total of £37,636 was raised for The Westminster Society and between 2011 and 2012 the Great Ormond Street Hospital received £11,000, and Brain Tumour Research, £14,000.

In 2012 The Churchill adopted a dog and named it Winston by sponsoring £5000 through the charity Dogs for the Disabled.
