= 107–171 Victoria Street =

Buildings in London, England

Coordinates: 51.4968°N 0.1394°W

1975 model of the buildings.

107–171 Victoria Street describes two adjacent buildings on the south side of Victoria Street in Central London.

The two buildings were constructed in the 1970s with shops along the ground floor frontage and offices on the upper level, with a distinctive crystalline appearance, rectangular bay windows and varying building heights along the street. The west building (known as 171) was originally called BP House; the east building (known as 123) was originally called Ashdown House after Baron Ashdown. A gap was left between the buildings to allow views of Westminster Cathedral which is set back from Victoria Street.

== Design ==
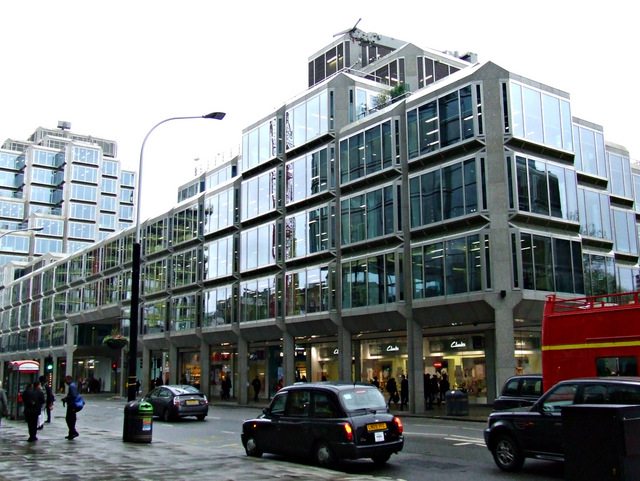
Bay windows at the west end of the 123 building.

The architects Elsom, Pack and Roberts designed the buildings for a consortium of the Crown Estate, the Army & Navy Stores and the Church Commissioners. The scheme was described by the Royal Fine Art Commission as "a crystalline form of clustered prisms with 15 storey towers at its eastern and western extremities, grading down to 4 floors and rising again to 5-6 storey pavilions on each side of a pedestrian piazza which opened up a view of the Cathedral from Victoria Street". The facade uses a combination of grey granite, bronze and tinted tinted glass.

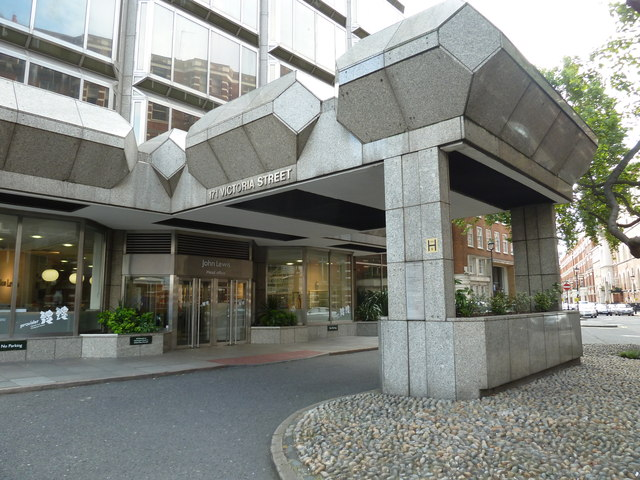
Porte-cochère at the west end of the 171 building, giving access to John Lewis offices.

== Occupiers and refurbishment ==
Upon completion the Civil Service took some of the office space and in 1989, the John Lewis occupied both buildings plus a neighbouring building in Carlyle Place.

In the twenty-first century, Landsec refurbished the 123 building in 2012 and TP Bennett secured permission to refurbish the 171 building. John Lewis relocated to nearby Pimlico in 2024.
