= Prime Minister's Resignation Honours =

Honours granted at the behest of an outgoing British prime minister

The Prime Minister's Resignation Honours in the United Kingdom are honours granted at the behest of an outgoing prime minister following their resignation. In such a list, a prime minister may ask the monarch to bestow peerages, or lesser honours, on any number of people of their choosing.

== History ==
Since May 2007, the House of Lords Appointments Commission has had to approve proposed peerages, while oversight by the Honours Committee within the Cabinet Office ensures that other honours are appropriate. Some previous lists had attracted criticism. Former Prime Minister Tony Blair did not issue a list by June 2007, apparently because of the "Cash for Honours scandal". Gordon Brown did not publish a resignation honours list either, but a dissolution list was issued on his advice (to similar effect).

David Cameron revived the practice in his Resignation Honours published in August 2016, following his resignation a month earlier. Some names on the list were leaked to the press several days in advance. A number of proposed recipients were reportedly blocked on ethical grounds. His successors, Theresa May, Boris Johnson, Liz Truss and Rishi Sunak followed suit in September 2019, June 2023, December 2023 and April 2025 respectively.

== Criticism ==
Resignation honours have been denounced by some as an example of cronyism. The 1976 resignation honours of Harold Wilson—which became known as the "Lavender List"—had caused controversy as a number of recipients were wealthy businessmen whose principles were considered antithetic to those held by the Labour Party at the time. Cameron's list was described by the New Statesman as a "who's who of failed Remainers". May's list was criticised with SNP MP Pete Wishart likening it to "handing out peerages like sweeties to the same Tory advisers who got us into this Brexit mess".

Liz Truss was confirmed to be eligible for a resignation honours list, despite only having been prime minister for seven weeks; this caused considerable controversy, with Alastair Campbell saying that she and Johnson had "disgraced and debased an office they should never have held". On 25 March 2023, The Sun and i newspapers reported Truss had submitted a Resignation Honours list recommending four people for honours. The list was published on 29 December 2023 at the same time as the 2024 New Year Honours, and was greeted with criticism for containing a list of her political supporters. Willie Russell of the Electoral Reform Society said, "It looks like the political class dishing out rewards for failure at a time when many people are still suffering the effects from her turbulent premiership".
