= Arnold Silverstone, Baron Ashdown =

Arnold Silverstone
- Born: 28 September 1911
- Died: 24 July 1977 (aged 65)
- Relatives: Lord Stone (brother)

Arnold Silverstone, Baron Ashdown (28 September 1911 – 24 July 1977) was a British life peer.

Arnold Ashdown was a property developer who developed Ashdown House, on Victoria Street, London SW1. He was also involved with the Conservative Party under Edward Heath.

Having been knighted in 1964, Silverstone was created Baron Ashdown, of Chelwood in the County of East Sussex on 3 January 1975.

He was the brother of Lord Stone.
