= 2022 Prime Minister's Resignation Honours (Liz Truss) =

British government recognitions

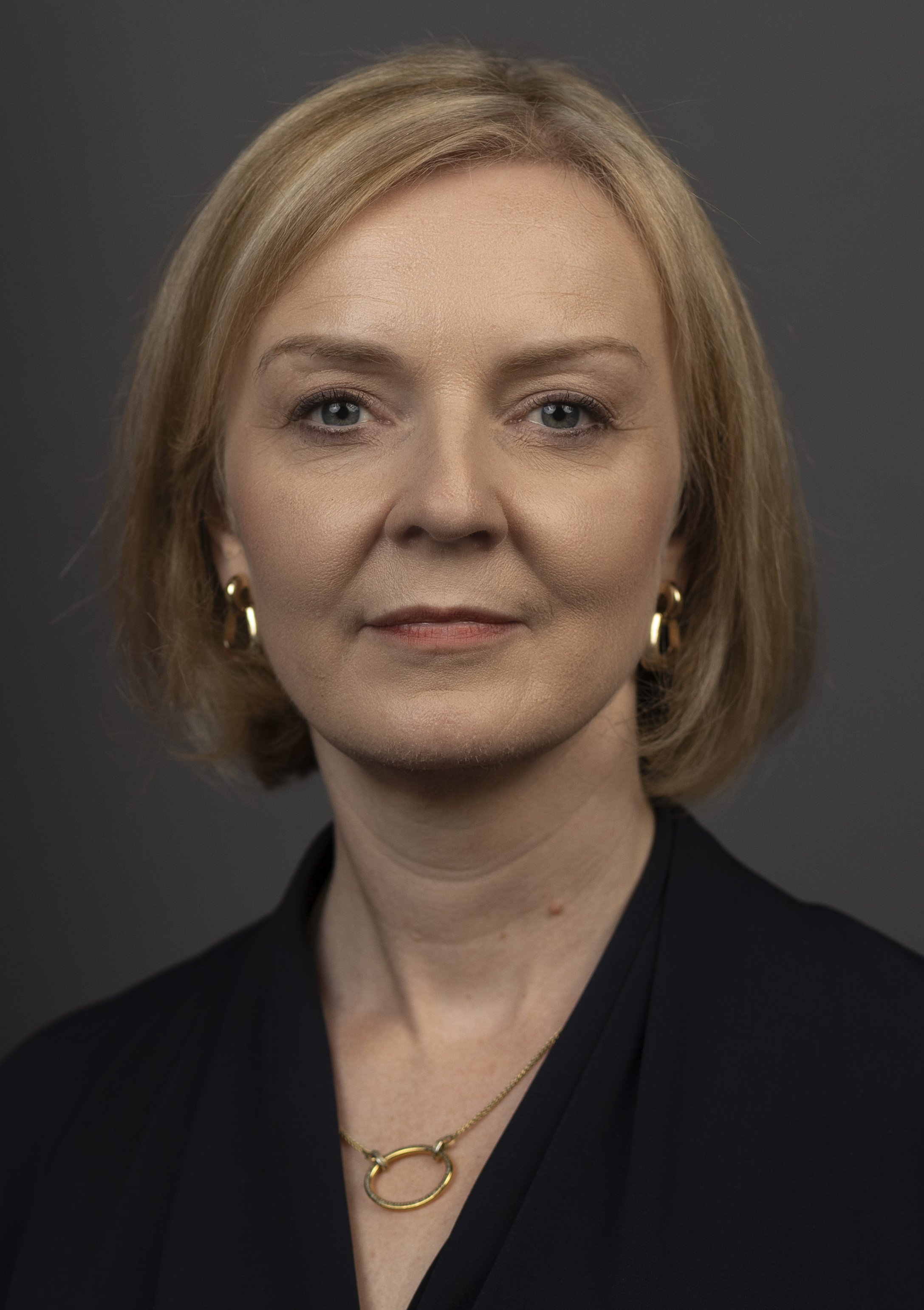
Liz Truss in 2022

The 2022 Prime Minister's Resignation Honours were honours awarded following the resignation of Liz Truss as Prime Minister of the United Kingdom in October 2022. Her resignation honours list was released on 29 December 2023, alongside the 2024 New Year Honours. Opposition politicians criticised the list in light of Truss's brief tenure as prime minister, and had called on her successor Rishi Sunak to block its release. Truss said that she was "delighted these champions for the conservative causes of freedom, limited government and a proud and sovereign Britain have been suitably honoured". The list was gazetted on 7 February 2024.

== Life peerages ==
- Matthew Elliott, to be Baron Elliott of Mickle Fell, of Barwick-in-Elmet in the City of Leeds – 6 February 2024
- Jon Moynihan, OBE, to be Baron Moynihan of Chelsea, of Chelsea in the Royal Borough of Kensington and Chelsea – 6 February 2024
- Ruth Porter, to be Baroness Porter of Fulwood, of Fulwood in the City of Sheffield – 13 February 2024.

== Order of the British Empire ==
=== Knight Commander of the Order of the British Empire (KBE) ===
- The Right Honourable Alec Shelbrooke MP, Minister of State for Defence Procurement during Truss's premiership

=== Dames Commander of the Order of the British Empire (DBE) ===
- Shirley Ida Conran, founder of the Maths Anxiety Trust
- Jacqueline Doyle-Price MP, Minister of State for Industry during Truss's premiership

=== Commanders of the Order of the British Empire (CBE) ===
- Sophie Jarvis, former special adviser
- Shabbir Merali, former special adviser

=== Officers of the Order of the British Empire (OBE) ===
- Robert Butler MP, parliamentary private secretary to Truss when she was Foreign Secretary
- Suzanne Webb MP, parliamentary private secretary to Truss when she was prime minister

=== Members of the Order of the British Empire (MBE) ===
- David Hills, Chairman of the South West Norfolk Conservative Association
