= Gannex =

Waterproof fabric

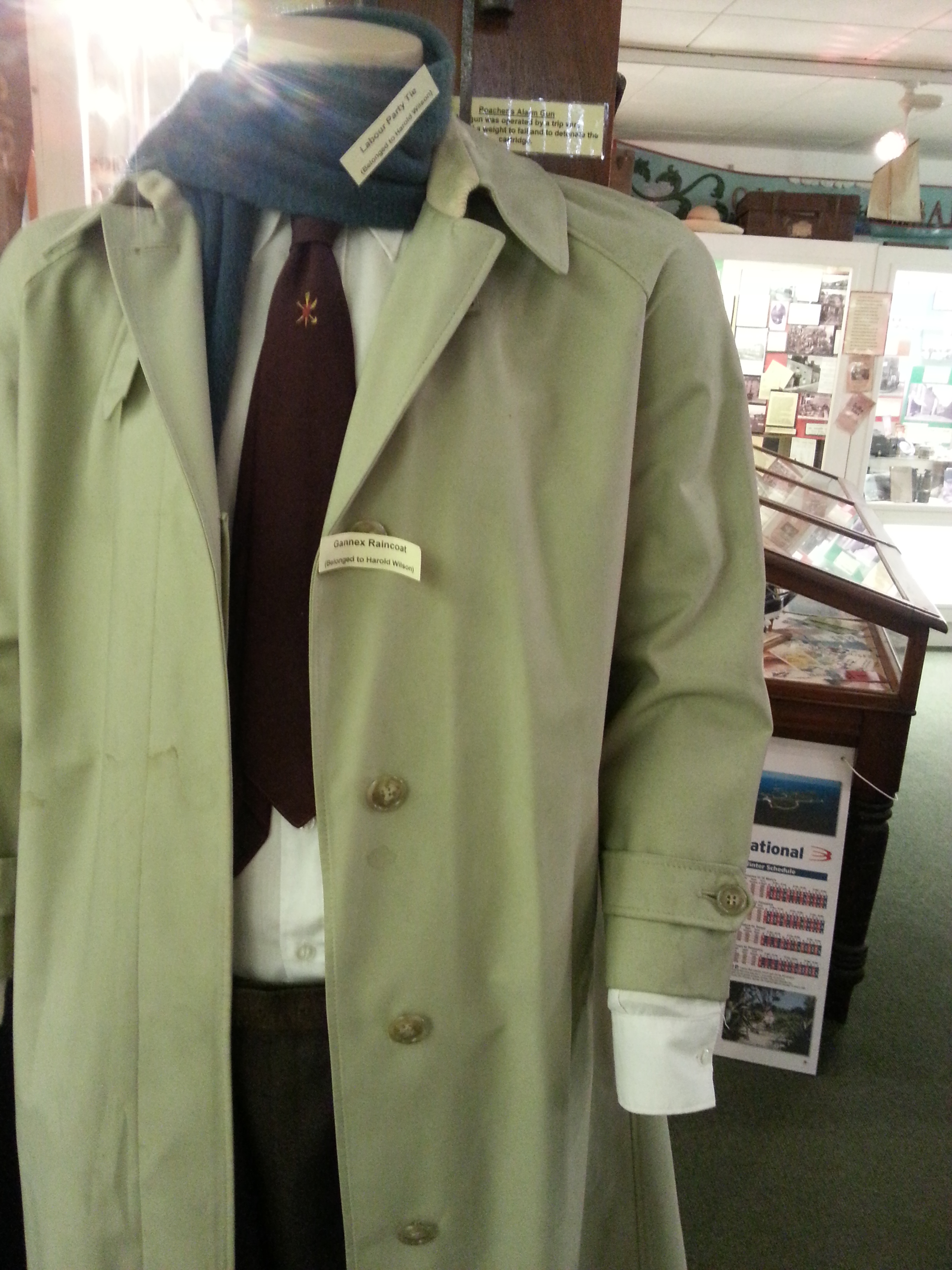
Harold Wilson's raincoat displayed in Scilly Isles museum 2014

Gannex is a waterproof fabric composed of an outer layer of nylon and an inner layer of wool with air between them. The trapped air is contained in pockets formed by fusing ("spot welding") the two layers at intervals. It was invented in 1951 by Joseph Kagan, a UK industrialist and the founder of Kagan Textiles Ltd., of Elland, which made raincoats. The company is now defunct. The mill occupied by the company was demolished in 2010. The raincoats were worn by a number of well-known people, such as the Prime Minister Harold Wilson.

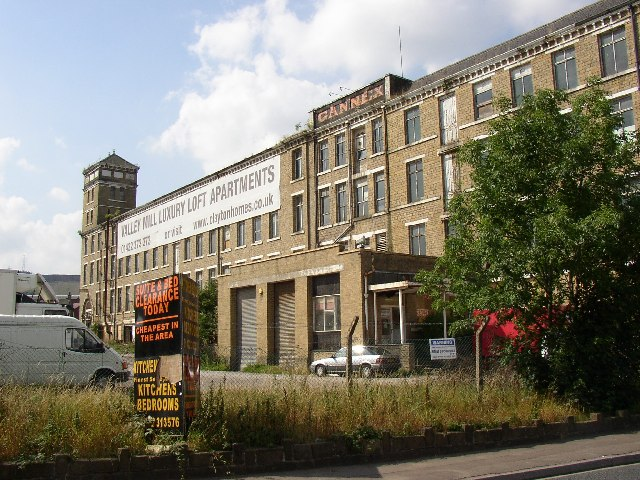
Gannex Mills at Elland, West Yorkshire
