= 1976 Prime Minister's Resignation Honours =

British government recognitions

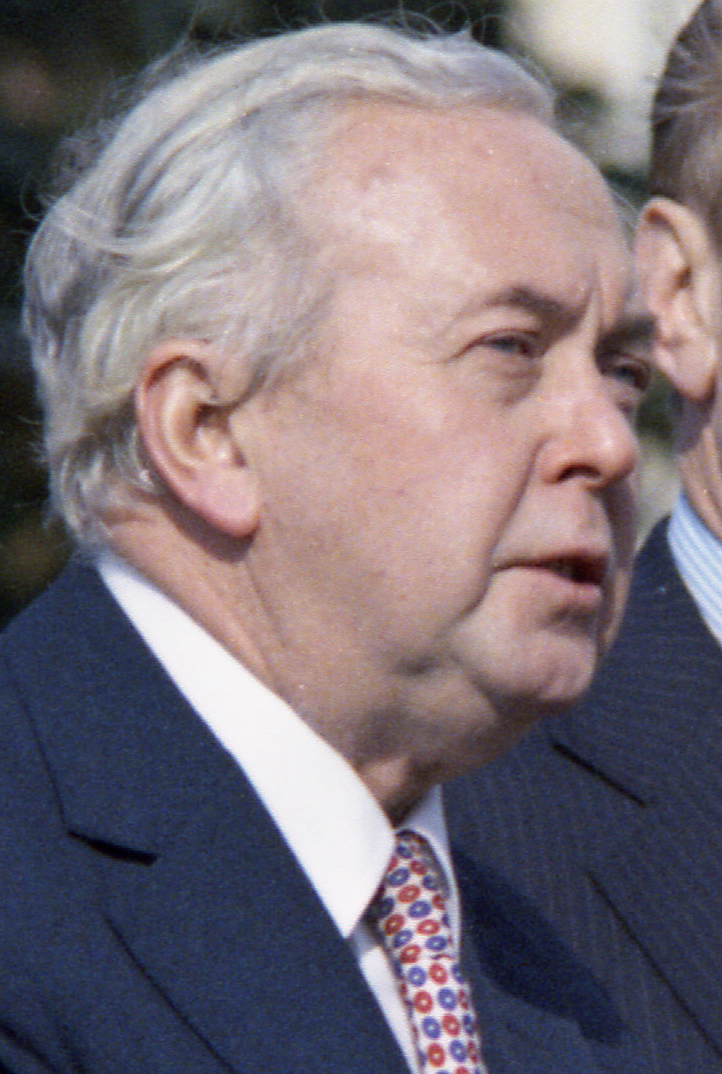
Harold Wilson in 1975

The 1976 Prime Minister's Resignation Honours were announced on 27 May 1976 to mark the second resignation of the Prime Minister, Harold Wilson. The list of resignation honours drew controversy due to questions of corruption, and became known satirically as the "Lavender List".

== Controversy ==
The list's controversy stemmed from a number of recipients being wealthy businessmen whose principles were considered antithetical to those held by the Labour Party at the time.

Roy Jenkins notes that Wilson's retirement "was disfigured by his, at best, eccentric resignation honours list, which gave peerages or knighthoods to some adventurous business gentlemen, several of whom were close neither to him nor to the Labour Party."

One businessman on the list, Lord Kagan, was convicted of fraud in 1980; Sir Eric Miller committed suicide while under investigation for fraud in 1977. Another beneficiary was the buccaneering financier James Goldsmith. Nearly all of the other names on the list such as actor John Mills were, however, uncontroversial. Dismissing the notoriety of these two names, both of Wilson's academic biographers, Professor Ben Pimlott and Philip Ziegler, writing in the 1990s long after the purported events stress that there was never any question at the time or subsequently of financial impropriety in the drawing up of the list.

=== Litigations ===
The origin of the name "Lavender List" derived from the claim made by former press secretary and journalist Joe Haines that the head of Wilson's political office, Lady Falkender, had written the original draft on lavender-coloured notepaper. No documentary evidence has been proffered to support this claim, and both Wilson and Falkender denied it. Joe Haines expressly denied any financial impropriety in the compilation of the list on national television in an interview on BBC's Panorama on 14 February 1977. In 2001 Joe Haines altered his allegations with an entirely new version of the "Lavender List". Lady Falkender sued Joe Haines for libel in 2007 over the statement that she was the author of the list. Many statements in the media were subject to litigation by both Wilson and Falkender during the 1970s, which later gave rise to a long complaint by Wilson published in The Times that his administration had been subject to an alleged smear campaign. Wilson's suspicions were later partially corroborated by former MI5 Assistant Director Peter Wright in his book Spycatcher, a book that was initially banned from publication in the UK.

According to a letter from Edith Summerskill published in The Times on 27 May 1977, the members of the Political Honours Scrutiny Committee "were astounded when we read the list of proposed honours. We told the civil servant present that we could not approve of at least half of the list, and would he see that this was conveyed to the Prime Minister", and that "it astonished us to find that, with one exception, the original list of recipients was published unchanged." However she commented that "we were in fact faced with a fait accompli which we had no power to upset."

== Political and Public Services List ==
The recipients of honours are displayed here as they were styled before their new honour, and arranged by honour.

=== Life peers ===
- Terence George Boston, Barrister-at-Law; former Member of Parliament for the Faversham Division of Kent.
- Sir Bernard Delfont, Chairman and Chief Executive, EMI Film and Theatre Corporation Ltd. For services to the Attlee Memorial Foundation.
- Sir Lew Grade, Chairman and Chief Executive, Associated Television Corporation Ltd. For services to television.
- Sir Joseph Kagan, Chairman, Kagan Textiles Ltd and associated companies.
- Albert James Murray, Former Member of Parliament for Gravesend, and Parliamentary Secretary, Ministry of Transport.
- Sir Max Rayne, property developer, for charitable services and services to the Arts.
- John Ernest Vaizey, Professor of Economics, and Head of the School of Social Sciences, Brunel University, Uxbridge.
- Sir Arthur George Weidenfeld, Chairman, Weidenfeld and Nicolson Ltd, Publishers.

=== Privy Counsellor ===
- Lionel Murray OBE, General Secretary, Trades Union Congress.

=== Members of the Order of the Companions of Honour (CH) ===
- The Right Honourable Lord Elwyn-Jones, The Lord Chancellor
- The Right Honourable Edward Watson Short, Lately Lord President of the Council. Member of Parliament for Newcastle upon Tyne, Central.

=== Knights Bachelor ===
- William Stanley Baker, Actor/Producer.
- James Michael Goldsmith, Chairman, Cavenham Ltd. For services to export and to ecology.
- Frederick Donald Gosling, For charitable services, HM Forces.
- James Edward Hanson, Chairman, Hanson Trust.
- Eric Merton Miller, Chairman, Peachey Property Corporation Ltd. Recently Treasurer of the Socialist International.
- John Lewis Ernest Watts Mills, CBE, Actor/Director.
- Sigmund Sternberg, Chairman, Commodities Research Unit Ltd Group.
- John Elliott Terry, Managing Director, National Film Finance Corporation.

=== Commander of the Order of the British Empire (CBE) ===
- Arthur Smith, Parliamentary Agent to Harold Wilson
- Henry Reginall Underhill, National Agent of the Labour Party.

=== Officer of the Order of the British Empire (OBE) ===
- Miss Doreen Stainforth (Mrs Clark), Broadcasting Officer, The Labour Party Information Department.
- Donald Willgoose, Chief Executive and Town Clerk, Knowsley Metropolitan Borough Council.
- Michael Edward Yarwood, Entertainer.
- Bess Hilda, Mrs Church, Personal Secretary to Roy Jenkins, MP
- Miss Mary Griffin, Private Secretary to the General Secretary of The Labour Party.
- Arthur Thomas Gunns, lately Supervisor, Despatch Department, Labour party Headquarters.
- William John Taylor, Meetings Officer, Labour Party Headquarters.

== Private Office List ==
=== Life peer ===
- Sir Joseph Ellis Stone, personal physician

=== Knighthood ===
- Alfred Henry Warren, private secretary to the government Chief Whip

=== Member of the Order of the British Empire (MBE) ===
- Fleet Chief Wren Steward (O) Dorothy Mary Gordon, Senior Steward at Chequers.
- Miss Doreen Andrew, Formerly Secretary in the Political Office
- Miss Peggy Patricia Field, Personal Secretary to Lady Wilson.
- William Charles Housden, B.E.M., Personal Driver
- Doris Molly, Mrs Knight, Assistant, Prime Minister's Office, No. 10 Downing Street.
- Mavis Dorothy, Mrs MacDonald, Secretary in the Political Office
- Thora, Mrs Pollard, Housekeeper

=== British Empire Medal ===
- Charles Beveridge, Senior Messenger, No.10 Downing Street
- Edith Margaret, Mrs Causer, Senior Cleaner, No.10 Downing Street
- Robert Geoffrey Matthews, Police Constable, Metropolitan Police
- Miss Doris May Richardson, Telephonist, No.10 Downing Street

== Docudrama ==
The Lavender List is a British television docudrama broadcast on BBC Four in March 2006 based on the version of events put forward by Joe Haines in 2001, events that he claimed led to the drafting of the 1976 Resignation Honours. Lady Falkender threatened to sue the BBC for libel over the programme, and in line with BBC policy in the wake of recent libel defeats, the BBC opted to settle out of court rather than contest the libel action. In addition to a financial settlement, the BBC agreed to never rebroadcast the programme.
