= Marcia Williams =

British civil servant and peer (1932–2019)

The Right Honourable The Baroness Falkender CBE PC
- Falkender on Talking Personally, 1984

Political Secretary to the Prime Minister of the United Kingdom
- In office 4 March 1974 – 5 April 1976
- Prime Minister: Harold Wilson
- Preceded by: Douglas Hurd
- Succeeded by: Tom McNally
- In office 16 October 1964 – 19 June 1970
- Prime Minister: Harold Wilson
- Preceded by: Office established
- Succeeded by: Douglas Hurd

Member of the House of Lords
- Lord Temporal
- Life peerage 11 July 1974 – 6 February 2019

Personal details
- Born: Marcia Field; 10 March 1932 Long Buckby, Northamptonshire, England
- Died: 6 February 2019 (aged 86) Southam, Warwickshire, England
- Party: Labour
- Spouse: George Edmund Charles Williams (m. 1955; div. 1961)
- Children: 2 (by Walter Terry)
- Education: Northampton High School, England; Queen Mary University of London

Marcia Matilda Williams, Baroness Falkender, CBE (née Field; 10 March 1932 – 6 February 2019), also known as Marcia Falkender, was known as the private secretary for, and then the political secretary and head of political office to, UK Labour prime minister Harold Wilson.

== Background and early career ==
Born Marcia Field in her parents' town of Long Buckby, there is an unconfirmed rumour that her mother was an illegitimate daughter of King Edward VII. Lady Falkender was educated at the independent selective Northampton High School and read for a BA in history at Queen Mary College, University of London. After graduating she became secretary to the general secretary of the Labour Party in 1955.

== In the service of Harold Wilson ==
In 1956, Marcia Williams, as she was then known, became private secretary to Harold Wilson, Member of Parliament for Huyton, a position she retained until 1964, when she rose to be his political secretary and head of the political office in his position as leader of the Labour Party and as prime minister from 1964 until 1970 and again from 1974 to 1976. Falkender said that she first met Wilson when he offered her a lift when she was standing at a bus stop. Wilson's press secretary Joe Haines said that the pair first met at a dinner with the Soviet premier, Nikita Khrushchev, at which Khrushchev and Labour MP George Brown had a drunken argument, which Williams took down in shorthand. Wilson reportedly drove her home after dinner. In 1970 she was appointed a Commander of the Order of the British Empire (CBE).

Questions were repeatedly raised in the press at the time about the propriety of her many commercial dealings; however, both Wilson and Williams successfully sued many London newspapers for libel. Later, Wilson publicly called for a Royal Commission of Inquiry into the press because of the defamation in the media, and that there had been a concerted smear campaign to de-stabilise his administration by MI5. These claims were partially corroborated by Peter Wright, former assistant director of MI5, in his book Spycatcher, which was banned in the UK by Prime Minister Margaret Thatcher's administration until a 1988 court case overturned the ban.

Until 1966, the award of peerages was the prerogative of the chief whip, and not the prime minister. Wilson took that power to award peerages for himself, and later told his policy adviser Bernard Donoughue that he did it because "that gal Marcia insisted on it". Donoughue's diary recorded Wilson telling one of his staff that he had just quarrelled with Falkender, who was demanding "peerages for friends". Donoughue's diary actually credits the "that gal Marcia insisted on it" comment to Freddie Warren, who ran the Chief Whip's office in No. 12 Downing Street from the mid-1950s until after Wilson resigned as prime minister in March 1976.

When Wilson resigned, Haines accused Falkender of writing the first draft of his Resignation Honours List on lavender paper, which Haines styled as the "Lavender List". Haines was never asked to produce any evidence for this claim, and none was provided. Certainly, Wilson's honours list included many businessmen and celebrities, along with Labour supporters. In a BBC Panorama programme aired on 14 February 1977, when asked to clarify his book, Haines explicitly and unequivocally denied any financial impropriety in the compilation of the list.

Wilson's choice of appointments caused lasting damage to his reputation; former home secretary Roy Jenkins said that Wilson's retirement "was disfigured by his, at best, eccentric resignation honours list, which gave peerages or knighthoods to some adventurous business gentlemen, several of whom were close neither to him nor to the Labour Party." In the 1990s, two large academic biographies of Wilson were published by Philip Ziegler and Ben Pimlott. Both authors asserted that there was no financial impropriety in the compilation of the list. Pimlott observed in his biography of Wilson that political secretaries often write down lists at the instructions of their employers, and that in this case the fact that the list was pink does not itself prove anything. Both Falkender and Wilson maintained that the list was Wilson's. Falkender said it was compiled on Wilson's last day in Downing Street: "He put a pad in front of me of the pink paper that was stock paper back then and asked me to write out the names. My typewriter had been packed away so I wrote them down by hand. It really didn't feel momentous."

She was elevated to the peerage as Baroness Falkender, of West Haddon in Northamptonshire, on 11 July 1974. Falkender had been her mother's maiden name.

== After Downing Street ==
In 1979, Falkender secretly began working with Gordon Reece and Lord McAlpine, two Conservative Party advisers who were close to Margaret Thatcher, to aid the party's election to office. According to Charles Moore, Thatcher's biographer, "The purpose of the meetings was for Lady Falkender to convey to the Tory campaigners her assessment of what the Labour party was thinking." Under Thatcher's leadership, the party won that year's general election.

=== House of Lords ===
Although Falkender attended sittings in the House of Lords and voted, she never made a speech. She eventually became the longest serving Labour member of the House of Lords. She last voted in 2011.

Following her peerage, Private Eye often referred to her as "Forkbender", an oblique reference to the contemporary activities of Israeli illusionist Uri Geller.

=== Writings ===
She wrote two books about her time in Downing Street: Inside Number 10 on the period 1964–1970 and Downing Street in Perspective on Wilson's third term as Prime Minister 1974–1976. After retiring from working in Downing Street, she worked as a columnist for the Mail on Sunday from 1983 to 1988. She continued to work for Wilson, handling his private business from the time of his resignation in 1976 until his death in 1995.

She was also one of the founder members of The Silver Trust, a charity which sponsored British silversmiths to provide a silver service for 10 Downing Street. Prior to The Silver Trust, Downing Street had no silverware of its own; it was provided on loan from other government offices.

=== Yes Minister ===
She was one of the sources inside Whitehall used by the writers of the comedy series Yes Minister, the other one being Lord Donoughue.

=== Libel action against the BBC ===
In 2001 Joe Haines re-wrote his original book, The Politics of Power, making allegations about Falkender. The BBC delayed the screening of a docudrama based on the book. After the programme (entitled The Lavender List) was aired on 1 March 2006, Falkender sued the BBC for libel, and was awarded £75,000. The BBC promised never to rebroadcast the programme.

== Personal life and death ==
Marcia Field married George Edmund Charles Williams in 1955, but they divorced in 1961; she continued to be known as Marcia Williams in her professional life. Falkender had two sons in the late 1960s by the former political editor of the Daily Mail, Walter Terry. When Wilson lost office in 1970, Falkender seized his papers, and her brother Tony Field helped Wilson break into her garage to recover them. On her brother's wedding day, in 1973, his passport, airline tickets and money disappeared. Field called the police, who were told by Falkender that she had put them away for "safe keeping".

In 1967, Wilson sued the pop group The Move for libel after the band's manager Tony Secunda published a promotional postcard for the single "Flowers in the Rain", featuring a caricature depicting Wilson in bed with Falkender. Wilson won the case, and all royalties from the song were assigned in perpetuity to a charity of Wilson's choosing.

Lady Falkender died on 6 February 2019, at the Newstead Lodge nursing home in Southam, Warwickshire, although news of her death was not reported until 16 February.

=== 2023 biography ===
In October 2023, a biography of Falkender was published which suggested that she and Wilson had conducted an affair shortly after they met, which was over before he became prime minister. According to an unpublished memoir by Wilson's election agent, George Caunt, the couple first met at a dinner at Labour's headquarters in April 1956. Caunt wrote that after the dinner finished, Wilson introduced himself to Falkender. After this, Wilson offered her a lift in his car, "and that night began an affair which was to last 5-6 years." Wilson always denied an affair, whilst Falkender dismissed the suggestion as a smear. McDougall's book has many details about her political career and her private life, including amongst other things how the press held off from publicising matters such as the potentially career-destroying revelation that she had had two children out of wedlock, and how she hid her pregnancies from the 10 Downing Street personnel.

Government offices
Preceded by Office established	Political Secretary to the Prime Minister; 1964–1970	Succeeded by Douglas Hurd
Preceded by Douglas Hurd	Political Secretary to the Prime Minister; 1974–1976	Succeeded by Tom McNally
