= Bernard Donoughue, Baron Donoughue =

British Labour Party politician, academic, businessman and author

The Right Honourable The Lord Donoughue
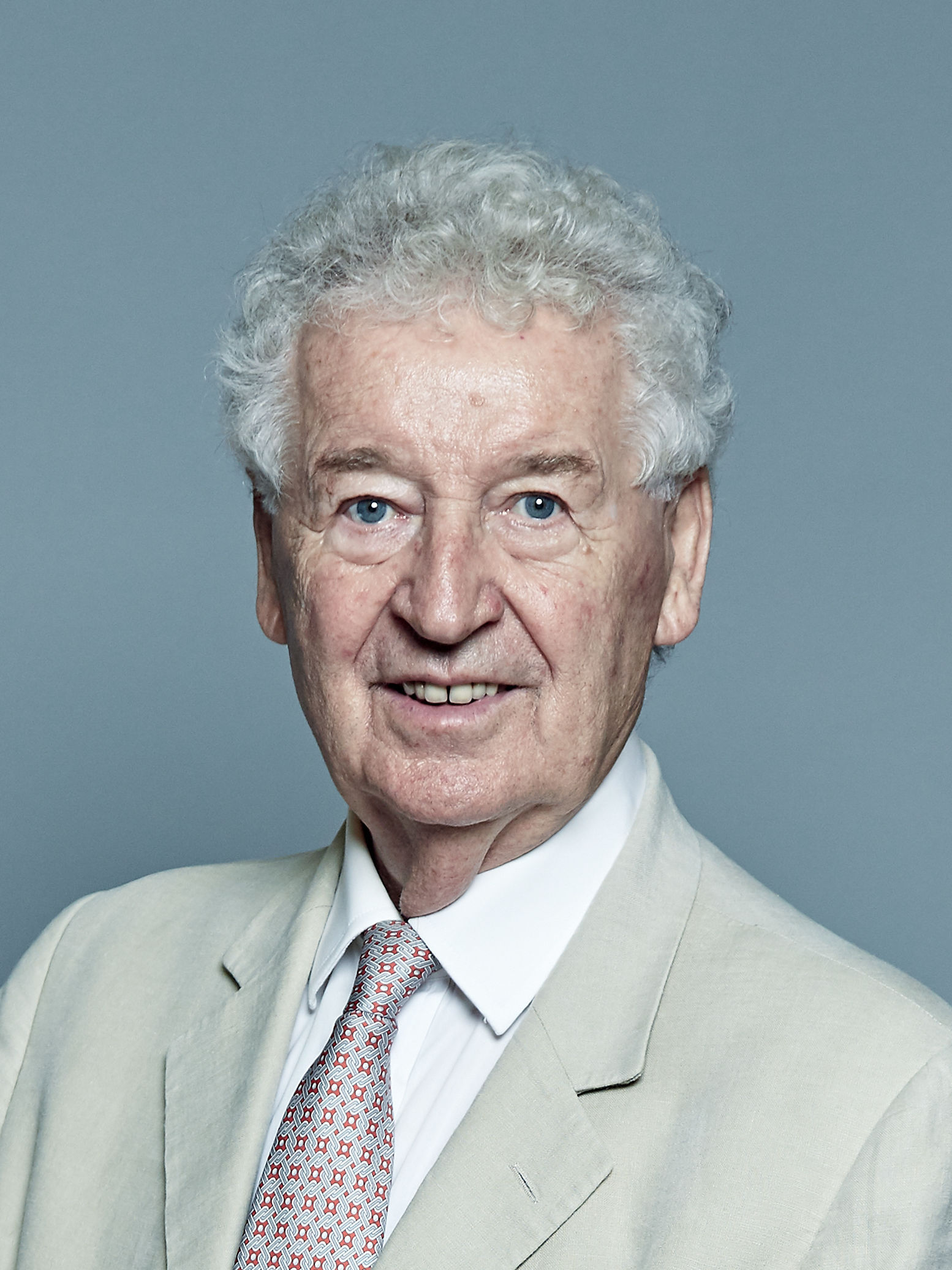
- Official portrait, 2018

Parliamentary Under-Secretary of State for Farming and the Food Industry
- In office 2 May 1997 – 29 July 1999
- Prime Minister: Tony Blair
- Preceded by: Tim Boswell
- Succeeded by: The Baroness Hayman

Member of the House of Lords
- Lord Temporal
- Life peerage 21 May 1985

Director of the Number 10 Policy Unit
- In office 8 March 1974 – 4 May 1979
- Prime Minister: Harold Wilson; James Callaghan
- Preceded by: Office established
- Succeeded by: John Hoskyns

Personal details
- Born: 8 September 1934 (age 92)
- Party: Labour
- Spouses: Carol Ruth Goodman (m. 1959; div. 1989); Sarah Berry (m. 2009)
- Children: 4
- Education: Lincoln College, Oxford (MA); Nuffield College, Oxford (DPhil)

Bernard Donoughue, Baron Donoughue (born 8 September 1934) is a British politician, academic, businessman and author. He is a member of the Labour Party.

== Early life and education ==
According to his autobiography, Donoughue was born into poverty. He is the son of Thomas Joseph Donoughue and Maud Violet Andrews. He was educated at Campbell Secondary Modern School and Northampton Grammar School. He studied at the University of Oxford, first at Lincoln College, where he obtained first-class honours in Modern History in 1957, then at Nuffield College, where he graduated with a D.Phil. on the American Revolution. The early stages of his research were pursued as Charles and Julia Henry Fellow at Harvard University. Donoughue moved into an academic career at the London School of Economics (LSE) (Lecturer, Senior Lecturer, and Reader: 1963–1974).

== Journalism ==
=== The Economist ===
Donoughue went into politics to be "associated with Labour governments which defended the interests of working people and underprivileged people." His career has always been at the centre of London, as the capital of politics, education, business and journalism.

His first job after university was as a member of the editorial staff of The Economist in 1959 and 1960, while a young Labour activist supporting Hugh Gaitskell. He was senior research officer of the Political and Economic Planning Institute between 1960 and 1963.

=== The Times ===
Out of government from 1979 to 1981, Donoughue was development director of the Economist Intelligence Unit, and in 1982-83 was assistant editor of The Times until his dismissal by the new right-wing owner, Rupert Murdoch. He gave his opinion in an interview with the New Statesman:

I'm very proud of that fact I was sacked by Murdoch. That's an honour! There are quite a number of us with that honour, of course.

Donoughue was at The Times during Murdoch's takeover and in his first year as proprietor, and he holds the media mogul responsible for what he dubs "a diminution in the values of our society". News International were in the throes of a business revolution in Fleet Street: at its hub was the end of a closed shop for the skilled craftsmen of the print 'chapters' who zealously guarded their trade secrets. Murdoch's actions broke up the old union grip on the news print media; former journalists like Tony Benn were incensed but the Labour Party were helpless to resist the changes from opposition. At the time he lived in Hampstead and Highgate, where John McDonnell was the party's candidate for a seat won by the Conservative Party in the 'landslide' election of 1983.

== Politics ==
=== Head of the policy research unit ===
For a long time a lecturer close to young people, he was asked by the Wilson government to join the founding Sports Council, an advisory body to harness amateur physical recreation. Twenty years later he would make his first speech in the Lords on Sporting Events (controls) bill.

Wilson took notice of Donoughue's communication skills, displayed in his career at the LSE and in his journalism, when he was appointed head of the policy research unit in 1974. Two years before that, there had been a flurry of questions in both houses about whether these unaccredited "political" advisers were paid from public funds. Wilson expanded the department in No.10, and it had a profound influence on policy formation. For the first time the Official Report published the salaries; and as being part of the Civil Service department.

Donoughue continued to head the policy research unit under Wilson's successor, James Callaghan, and he held the office until the defeat of the Labour Party in 1979. He was an admirer and close friend of Callaghan, whose relaxed 'beer and sandwiches' approach to political interaction contrasted to the intensity of successive prime ministerial conceited wisdom that demanded heavy studying.

=== House of Lords ===
On 21 May 1985 he was created a life peer as Baron Donoughue, of Ashton in the County of Northampton.

Donoghue was an Opposition Labour spokesman for Energy, Heritage and Treasury matters from 1991 to 1992. In 1997 Tony Blair appointed him a junior minister at the Ministry of Agriculture, Fisheries and Food, in which role he served until 1999. He later joined the Countryside Alliance against New Labour's policy on hunting with dogs, and the Foot-and-mouth disease outbreak.

From November 1995, shortly after the Eurosceptics had been defeated by the Major government, Donoughue, still a staunchly Labour peer, was appointed to the Lords Works of Arts committee. He was not removed from this duty when Labour replaced the Conservatives in the 1997 general election, until a clash with the New Labour leadership, but he was later appointed a trustee of the Victoria County History.

Donoghue is a climate change denialist and a trustee of the Global Warming Policy Foundation (a climate denialist think tank).

He is a member of Labour Friends of Israel.

=== Whitehall source for Yes Minister ===
In the early 1980s he was one of the sources inside Whitehall used by the writers of the comedy series Yes Minister, the other one being Baroness Falkender.

== Other roles ==
=== Finance industry ===
Donoughue was head of research and investment policy of Grieveson Grant and Co Stockbrokers from 1982 to 1986 and head of international research and director of Kleinwort Grieveson Securities Ltd from 1986 to 1988, a branch arm of the investment bank. Following this, Donoughue was executive vice-chair of LBI from 1988 to 1991 and director of Towcester Racecourse Ltd from 1992 to 1997.

=== Horse racing ===
Donoughue helped found the British Horse Industry Confederation in 1999 and was a Consultant Member until 2003. This coincided with appointment that September with co-option onto the joint Lords and Commons committee tasked with the responsibility of drafting a new Gambling bill. The outcome would be the licensing of so-called Big Casinos and a general release of universal internet betting rights. On 22 Dec 2015 he declared a gift to the bookmakers union. The radical change to the status quo proved a revolution in working people's experience of gaming that would indirectly cause remedial action on payday loans.

Donoughue became chairman of the Starting Price Regulatory Commission (SPRC) when it was founded in 2003, and as of 2016 was still in that role. The SPRC is a non-profit organisation operating on a cost recovery basis that

is responsible for the integrity of the starting price (SP). The majority of bets on British horseracing struck with bookmakers in betting shops and other off-course outlets are paid out according to the SP. The job of the Commission is to ensure that the returned price accurately reflects the price available on-course at the off.

=== Education ===
He is an honorary fellow of the LSE, and was a visiting professor of Government there from 2000 to 2011/2012.

== Personal life ==
Donoughue was married to Carol Ruth Goodman from 1959 until their divorce in 1989; they have two sons and two daughters. He married Sarah, Lady Berry, widow of Sir Anthony Berry, in 2009.

Donoughue was chairman of the London Symphony Orchestra from 1979 to 1991, patron from 1989 to 1995, and has been an associate since 2000.

== Bibliography ==
=== Books ===
- Bernard Donoughue and Janet Alker. Trade Unions in a Changing Society. London: PEP, 1963.
- Bernard Donoughue. British Politics and the American Revolution: the path to war, 1773–75. London: Macmillan, 1964.
- W. T. Rodgers; Bernard Donoughue. The People into Parliament: an illustrated history of the Labour Party. London: Thames and Hudson, 1966.
- Bernard Donoughue and George William Jones. Herbert Morrison: Portrait of a Politician. London: Weidenfeld and Nicolson, 1973. ISBN 9780297766056
- Bernard Donoughue. Prime Minister: Conduct of Policy Under Harold Wilson and James Callaghan, 1974–79. London: Jonathan Cape, 1987. ISBN 9780224024501
- Bernard Donoughue. The Heat of the Kitchen: an autobiography. London: Politicos, 2004.
- Bernard Donoughue. Downing Street Diary: Volume 1 – With Harold Wilson in No. 10. London: Jonathan Cape, 2004. ISBN 0224040227
- Bernard Donoughue. Downing Street Diary: Volume 2 – With James Callaghan in No. 10. London: Pimlico, 2009. ISBN 1845950941
- Bernard Donoughue. Westminster Diary: A Reluctant Minister under Tony Blair. London: I.B.Taurus, 2016. ISBN 1784536504
- Bernard Donoughue. Westminster Diary Volume 2: Farewell to Office. London: I.B. Tauris, 2017. ISBN 1784539465

=== Critical studies and reviews of Donoughue's work ===
Downing Street diary

- Watkins, Alan (4 October 2008). "The end of old Labour". The Spectator. 308 (9397): 40–41. Archived from the original on 4 December 2008.

Orders of precedence in the United Kingdom
Preceded by The Lord Vinson	Gentlemen; Baron Donoughue	Followed by The Lord Irvine of Lairg
