= Joseph Kagan, Baron Kagan =

British industrialist (1915–1995)

Joseph Kagan, Baron Kagan (6 June 1915 – 18 January 1995) was a Lithuanian-born businessman and the founder of Kagan Textiles, of Elland, which made raincoats from the waterproof Gannex fabric he had invented. Gannex raincoats were worn by Prime Minister Harold Wilson, a friend of his. Kagan was sent to prison for ten months in 1980 for tax evasion.

== Early life ==
He was born Juozapas Kaganas into a Litvak family in what after World War I became the Republic of Lithuania, but then in the Russian Empire. His parents, Benjamin and Miriam Kagan, had built up a successful textile business in Kaunas. He first came to England in 1933 to study at the University of Leeds, but returned to Lithuania, where he was trapped on the outbreak of the Second World War in Kaunas. His father was away when the Soviets invaded in 1940, and escaped bound for Britain; Benjamin, his father, was the second oldest man in Britain when he died at the age of 109. Unusually, Kagan was allowed to retain the family's woollen factory, leading to (unproven) suspicions he was an agent of the Soviet security services.

The Nazis invaded Lithuania during summer 1941, and Kagan was interned by them. He married Margarita Shtromaite (later Lady Kagan) in the Kaunas Ghetto. The newlyweds and Kagan's mother, Mira managed to survive over three years in this ghetto. Initially, they were ordinary inmates, but when Kagan realised there was no chance of their surviving unless they escaped, he organised a hiding place for himself, his new wife and his mother in a factory just outside the ghetto walls. The three lived in a small box in the factory attic for nine months, kept alive by the efforts of a Lithuanian non-Jew, Vytautas Rinkevicius, who risked his and his family's life to save them.

== Life in England ==
When the Nazis were ousted from Lithuania, Joseph and Margaret Kagan made their way to Bucharest and from there, to Britain. From 1946 he settled in Huddersfield and began work as a blanket weaver. He founded Kagan Textiles Ltd. at a small factory opposite Elland Town Hall.

In 1951, Kagan invented Gannex, leading to his firm's expansion and its move to a larger mill in Dewsbury Road. After the then opposition trade spokesman, Harold Wilson, wore a Gannex coat on a world tour in 1956, the raincoats became fashion icons, and were worn by world leaders such as Lyndon B. Johnson, Mao Zedong and Nikita Khrushchev, as well as by Queen Elizabeth II and Prince Philip, Duke of Edinburgh. In addition they were worn by Arctic and Antarctic explorers, Himalayan climbers, the armed services and police forces in Britain and Canada. The success of the new fabric made Kagan a multi-millionaire and a series of mergers, takeovers and outright purchases put Kagan Textiles in control of one of the most efficient combines in the textile and clothing industries. In 1967, he bought Barkisland Hall, Barkisland as accommodation for visitors to his company.

Huddersfield was the home town of Harold Wilson, Leader of the Opposition in 1963, and Prime Minister from 1964 to 1970 and from 1974 to 1976. Kagan became close to Wilson and provided funding for his private office. In Wilson's first resignation honours list in 1970, Kagan was given a knighthood. In 1971, a defecting KGB agent, Oleg Lyalin, relayed accounts of Kagan boasting of his connection to Wilson, leading to MI5 placing him under surveillance, but finding no evidence of spying.

When Wilson resigned the second time as Prime Minister in March 1976, Kagan was made a life peer as Baron Kagan, of Elland in the County of West Yorkshire, in the 1976 Prime Minister's Resignation Honours, taking the Labour Party whip.

Kagan was later charged with tax evasion, though the formal charges were styled as "theft" (of barrels of indigo dye) from his, by then, former company and "false accounting", to comply with extradition treaties which did not cover tax offences. After a stay in Tel Aviv, he was arrested in Paris and extradited to Britain. On 12 December 1980, he was convicted of four counts of theft. He was fined £375,000 and served a ten-month sentence, first in Armley, then in Rudgate open prison, Yorkshire. He lost his knighthood, but his peerage could not be forfeited. It was also revealed around this time that Kagan had been friendly with Richardas Vaygauskas, a former official at the Russian embassy, who was known to be a KGB agent. However, Tam Dalyell in his 1995 obituary of Kagan, believed that he had maintained such contacts to assist relatives in Vilnius; Vaygauskas was also from Lithuania.

After his release from custody, Kagan returned to the House of Lords and spoke on prison reform.

== Personal life and death ==
Kagan was married to Margarita Shtromaite (later Lady Kagan).

In 1994, his health deteriorated, and he died peacefully in his London apartment the following year, aged 79.

His son Daniel Kagan was a Democratic member of the Colorado House of Representatives.

== Arms ==
Coat of arms of Joseph Kagan, Baron Kagan

Crest
Upon a helm with a wreath Or Vert and Gules issuant from a circlet of barbed wire meshed Sable and from flames Proper a phoenix Or charged on the breast with two triangles interlaced Sable.
Escutcheon
Per chevron Vert and Gules a chevron rompu Or fretted with barbed wire Sable between in chief two pairs of the text letter K each pair addorsed and in base two triangles interlaced Gold on a bordure Argent eight martlets Gules
Supporters
Dexter an artisan wearing a Gannex apron and bib holding in the exterior hand a shuttle Proper, sinister a Hebrew scholar of circa 1550 habited in a long gown and wearing a skull cap Sable holding in front of him in the exterior hand an open book Proper bound Gules edged Or having on the dexter page the Roman numerals XV and III and on the sinister page the numerals MCDLXI Sable.
Motto
(in Hebrew) Knowledge Work Compassion

== Sources ==
- John A. Hargreaves. "Kagan, Joseph, Baron Kagan (1915–1995)". Oxford Dictionary of National Biography (online ed.). Oxford University Press. (Subscription, Wikipedia Library access or UK public library membership required.)
