= Eric Miller (businessman) =

English businessman (1926–1977

Sir Eric Merton Miller
- Born: September 28, 1926; Croydon, Surrey, England
- Died: September 22, 1977 (aged 50); London, England
- Occupation: Businessman
- Known for: Chairman of Peachey Property Corporation
- Spouses: Leonore E. Frankel (m. 1950; div.); Myra Cohen (m. 1957)

Miller's grave at Willesden Jewish Cemetery in 2026

Sir Eric Merton Miller (28 September 1926 – 22 September 1977) was an English businessman, who committed suicide while under investigation for fraud.

== Early life ==
Miller was brought up in the Jewish community in Croydon, Surrey, and left school at the age of 16 to enlist in the Royal Air Force and was stationed at Drigh Road in Karachi (modern-day Pakistan) and served through the Partition. On his return, he worked as an estate agent in London. Shortly thereafter, he was spotted as a business talent by George Farrow who ran a small property company called Peachey. Farrow recruited Miller to work for him, and after Farrow's retirement, Miller became Chairman of Peachey.

== Property dealings ==
Under Miller's guidance, Peachey Property Corporation took over many other companies and became the predominant freeholder for high-end leasehold properties in London. In the early 1960s, a sudden change in policy led Peachey to sell off some of the residential property in an attempt to become a major player in the commercial property field (then undergoing a boom). This attempt was not particularly successful. Miller was the developer of the Churchill Hotel in Portman Square for the Loews Corporation (US).

== Political activity ==
Miller's father had been a Labour Party councillor and he also supported the party. In the early 1970s, Eric Miller began contributing to the running of Harold Wilson's private office and became a large financial supporter. He was appointed to the board of Labour Party Properties and served as Treasurer of the Socialist International. He was also a long serving director of Fulham F.C. previously having a stand at the club's Craven Cottage stadium named after him, since renamed as the Riverside Stand.

== Investigations ==
Miller received a knighthood in the 1976 Prime Minister's Resignation Honours list. However, rumours were already growing that the financial dealings of his companies had not been legitimate, and his inclusion in the list was criticised. Investigations uncovered the siphoning off of large sums from the Peachey Property Corporation, and Miller was forced from the chairmanship and eventually off the Peachey board entirely in early 1977. The Fraud Squad and Department of Trade launched investigations, and Miller was served with four writs seeking restitution of funds he had allegedly taken.

== Personal life and death ==
Miller was twice married, first to Leonore E. Frankel in 1950. The marriage ended in divorce. He married secondly to Myra Cohen in 1957.

Miller committed suicide in September 1977, shooting himself in the head on the Jewish Day of Atonement.
