= Michael Heseltine =

British politician (born 1933)

The Right Honourable The Lord Heseltine CH PC
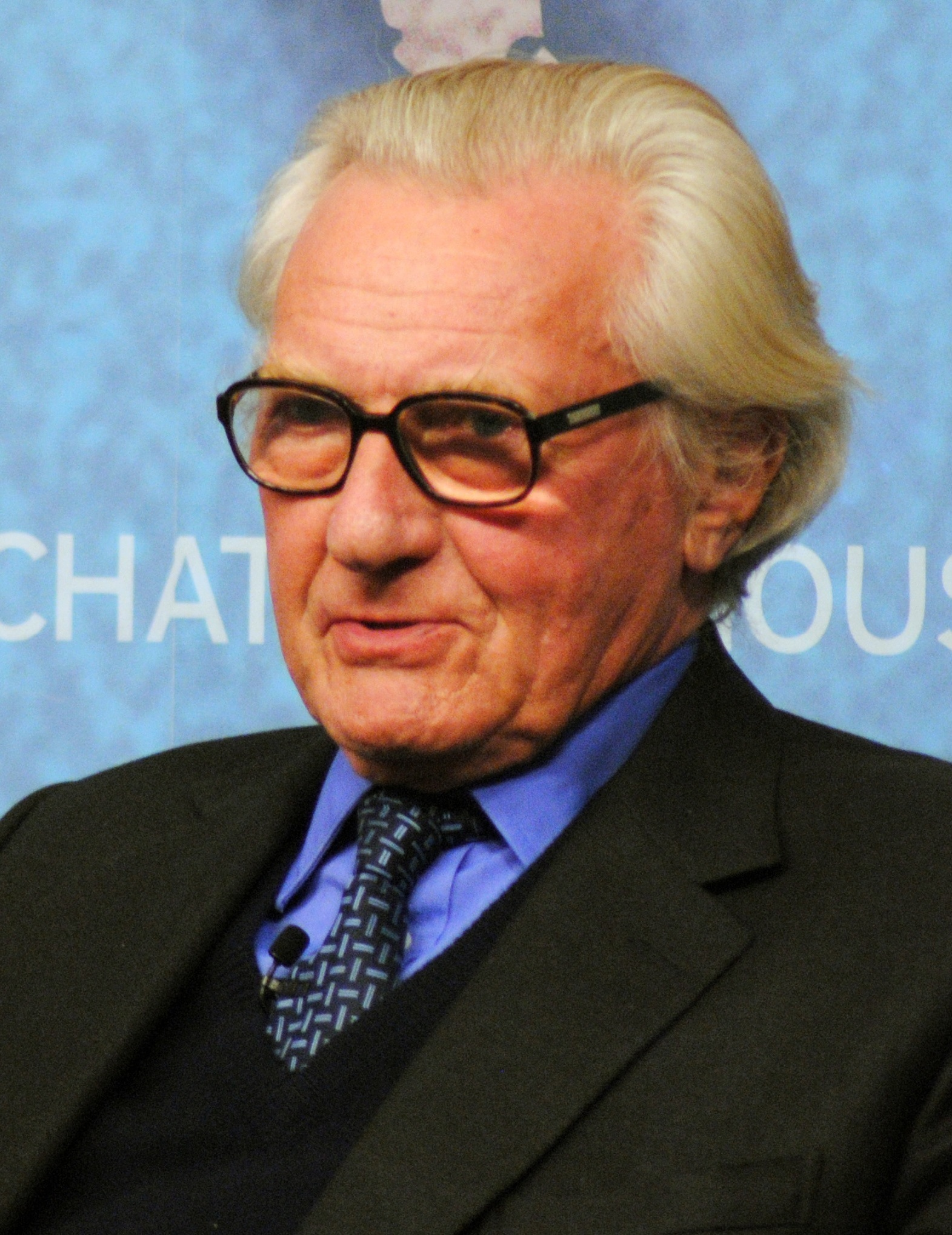
- Heseltine in 2013

Deputy Prime Minister of the United Kingdom
- In office 5 July 1995 – 2 May 1997
- Monarch: Elizabeth II
- Prime Minister: John Major
- Preceded by: Geoffrey Howe (Note: Office vacant between 1 November 1990 and 5 July 1995.)
- Succeeded by: John Prescott
Ministerial offices
First Secretary of State
In office 5 July 1995 – 2 May 1997
Prime Minister	John Major
Preceded by	Barbara Castle (Note: Office vacant between 19 June 1970 and 20 July 1995.)
Succeeded by	John Prescott (Note: Office vacant between 2 May 1997 and 8 June 2001.)
Secretary of State for Trade and Industry President of the Board of Trade
In office 11 April 1992 – 5 July 1995
Prime Minister	John Major
Preceded by	Peter Lilley
Succeeded by	Ian Lang
Secretary of State for the Environment
In office 28 November 1990 – 11 April 1992
Prime Minister	John Major
Preceded by	Chris Patten
Succeeded by	Michael Howard
In office 5 May 1979 – 6 January 1983
Prime Minister	Margaret Thatcher
Preceded by	Peter Shore
Succeeded by	Tom King
Secretary of State for Defence
In office 6 January 1983 – 9 January 1986
Prime Minister	Margaret Thatcher
Preceded by	John Nott
Succeeded by	George Younger
Junior ministerial offices
Minister of State for Aerospace and Shipping
In office 24 March 1972 – 4 March 1974
Prime Minister	Edward Heath
Preceded by	Frederick Corfield
Succeeded by	Stanley Clinton Davis
Parliamentary Under-Secretary of State for Environment
In office 15 October 1970 – 7 April 1972
Prime Minister	Edward Heath
Preceded by	Office established
Succeeded by	Reginald Eyre
Parliamentary Secretary to the Ministry of Transport
In office 24 June 1970 – 15 October 1970
Prime Minister	Edward Heath
Preceded by	Albert Murray
Succeeded by	Office abolished
Shadow cabinet portfolios
Deputy Leader of the Opposition
In office 2 May 1997 – 19 June 1997
Leader	John Major
Preceded by	John Prescott
Succeeded by	William Hague (Note: Office not in use until 2005 when Hague was appointed Senior Member of the Shadow Cabinet, a position equivalent to that of Deputy Leader of the Opposition)
Shadow Chancellor of the Duchy of Lancaster
In office 2 May 1997 – 19 June 1997
Leader	John Major
Preceded by	Derek Foster
Succeeded by	Gillian Shephard
Shadow Secretary of State for Trade and Industry
In office 2 May 1997 – 11 June 1997
Leader	John Major
Preceded by	Margaret Beckett
Succeeded by	John Redwood
In office 19 June 1974 – 18 February 1975
Leader	Edward Heath
Preceded by	Peter Walker
Succeeded by	Terence Higgins (Trade); Himself (Industry)
Shadow Secretary of State for the Environment
In office 19 November 1976 – 4 May 1979
Leader	Margaret Thatcher
Preceded by	Timothy Raison
Succeeded by	Peter Shore
Shadow Secretary of State for Industry
In office 18 February 1975 – 19 November 1976
Leader	Margaret Thatcher
Preceded by	Himself (Trade and Industry)
Succeeded by	John Biffen

Member of the House of Lords
- Lord Temporal
- Life peerage 12 July 2001

Member of Parliament
- In office 31 March 1966 – 14 May 2001
- Preceded by: Henry Studholme
- Succeeded by: Boris Johnson
- Constituency: Tavistock (1966–1974); Henley (1974–2001)

Personal details
- Born: Michael Ray Dibdin Heseltine; 21 March 1933 (age 93) Swansea, Wales
- Party: Conservative (Note: Whip suspended from 21 May 2019 to 8 July 2024)
- Other political affiliations: National Liberal
- Spouse: Anne Williams (m. 1962)
- Children: 3, including Annabel
- Education: Pembroke College, Oxford

Military service
- Allegiance: United Kingdom
- Branch/service: British Army
- Years of service: 1959
- Rank: Second lieutenant
- Unit: Welsh Guards

Michael Ray Dibdin Heseltine, Baron Heseltine (/ˈhɛzəltaɪn/; born 21 March 1933) is a British politician. Having begun his career as a property developer, he became one of the founders of the publishing house Haymarket Media Group in 1957. Heseltine served as a Conservative Member of Parliament from 1966 to 2001. He was a prominent figure in the governments of Margaret Thatcher and John Major, and served as Deputy Prime Minister and First Secretary of State under Major from 1995 to 1997.

Heseltine entered the Cabinet in 1979 as Secretary of State for the Environment, where he promoted the "Right to Buy" campaign that allowed people to purchase their council houses. He was considered an adept media performer and a charismatic minister, although he was frequently at odds with Thatcher on economic issues. He was one of the most visible "wets", whose "One Nation" views were epitomised by his support for the regeneration of Liverpool in the early 1980s when it was facing economic collapse; this later earned him the award of Freeman of the City of Liverpool in 2012. As Secretary of State for Defence from 1983 to 1986, he was instrumental in the political battle against the Campaign for Nuclear Disarmament. He resigned from the Cabinet in 1986 over the Westland affair and returned to the backbenches, becoming a vocal critic of Thatcher, mostly because of her Eurosceptic views and confrontational approach in Parliament. Following Geoffrey Howe's resignation speech in November 1990, Heseltine challenged Thatcher for the party leadership, polling well enough to deny her an outright victory on the first ballot. Following Thatcher's subsequent resignation, Heseltine lost to Major on the second ballot, but returned to the Cabinet in his former post of Environment Secretary when Major became prime minister.

As a key ally of Major, Heseltine was appointed President of the Board of Trade and Secretary of State for Trade and Industry following the 1992 general election. He supported Major when his leadership was challenged in 1995, and was promoted to Deputy Prime Minister and First Secretary of State. He declined to seek the leadership of the party following Major's 1997 election defeat, and served in Major's shadow cabinet as Deputy Leader of the Opposition, Shadow Chancellor of the Duchy of Lancaster and Shadow Secretary of State for Trade and Industry while the leadership election to succeed him was taking place.

Heseltine was created a life peer in 2001 and has remained a vocal advocate of modernisation within the party. He has continued to make political interventions, criticising Brexit and Boris Johnson following the 2016 Brexit referendum result. In 2019, Heseltine had the whip suspended after saying he would vote for the Liberal Democrats, rather than the Conservatives, at the 2019 European Parliament election. Heseltine had the whip restored in July 2024.

== Early life ==
Michael Heseltine was born at Eaton Crescent, in Swansea in Wales on 21 March 1933. He was the son of Territorial Army Colonel Rupert Dibdin Heseltine (1902–1957), TD, of the Royal Engineers during the Second World War, a factory owner and South Wales local director of Dawnays Ltd, bridge and structural engineers, and Eileen Ray (née Pridmore). The Heseltine family were in the tea trade: Michael Heseltine's great-grandfather, William Heseltine, was a clerk who worked his way up to being manager of Tetley, later being involved in establishing a chain of grocers; he killed himself after suffering the loss of his fortune through debt and bad investments. Michael Heseltine's grandfather, John William Dibdin Heseltine (whose mother was a great-granddaughter of the composer and songwriter Charles Dibdin), became a tea salesman and relocated from Huntingdonshire to Swansea, the docks being a major arrival point for tea shipments. Earlier generations had been farm labourers in Pembrey.

Heseltine's mother originated in West Wales, daughter of James Pridmore, a dock labourer who unloaded coal from ships, later hiring others to do so and founding West Glamorgan Collieries Ltd, a short-lived company that briefly worked two small mines on the outskirts of Swansea (1919–1921); his father, also James, worked at the Swansea docks. Due to this heritage Heseltine was later made an honorary member of the Swansea Dockers Club.

Heseltine was brought up in relative luxury at No. 1, Eaton Crescent, Swansea (now No. 5). He told Tatler interviewer Charlotte Edwardes in 2016: "At prep school, I started a birdwatching club called the Tit Club. Every member was named after a member of the tit family: the Marsh Tit, the Blue Tit. I was the Great Tit". He once feared the story might reach the press: "I just know if that had got out when I was in active politics, I would never have recovered". Heseltine enjoyed angling in Brynmill Park and won a junior competition. He was educated at Broughton Hall in Eccleshall, Staffordshire, when it was briefly amalgamated with Brockhurst Preparatory school, Bromsgrove School, Worcestershire, and Shrewsbury School, Shropshire.

== Oxford ==
Heseltine campaigned briefly as a volunteer in the October 1951 general election before going up to Pembroke College, Oxford. While there, in frustration at his inability to be elected to the committee of the Oxford University Conservative Association, he founded the breakaway Blue Ribbon Club. Along with undergraduates Guy Arnold, Julian Critchley and Martin Morton he canvassed workers at the gates of the Vickers Shipyard in Barrow-in-Furness. Julian Critchley recounted a story from his student days of how he plotted his future on the back of an envelope, a future that would culminate as prime minister in the 1990s. A more detailed apocryphal version has him writing down: 'millionaire 25, cabinet member 35, party leader 45, prime minister 55,' though Heseltine himself disputes this and instead recalls a lack of self-belief. He became a millionaire and was a member of the Cabinet from the age of 46, but narrowly failed to become Party Leader or prime minister.

His biographers Michael Crick and Julian Critchley (who was a contemporary of Heseltine's at Brockhurst Prep School) recount how, despite not having an innate gift for public speaking, he became a strong orator through much effort, which included practising his speeches in front of a mirror, listening to tape recordings of speeches by television administrator Charles Hill, and taking voice-coaching lessons from a vicar's wife. (In the 1970s and 1980s, Heseltine's conference speech was often the highlight of the Conservative Party Conference, despite his views being well to the left of the then leader Margaret Thatcher.) He was eventually elected to the Library Committee of the Oxford Union for Hilary (Spring) Term 1953. The Oxford Union minutes record after a debate on 12 February 1953 that "Mr Heseltine should guard against artificial mannerisms of voice and calculated flourishes of self-conscious histrionics; this is only worth saying because he has the makings of a first class speaker".

Heseltine was then elected to the Standing Committee of the Oxford Union for Trinity (summer) Term 1953. On 30 April 1953 he opposed the setting up of the Western European Union (a European defence treaty), not least because it might antagonise the USSR following the supposed "recent change of Soviet attitudes" (i.e. after Stalin's death). On 4 June 1953, he called for the development of the British Commonwealth as a third major power in the world (after the US and USSR). At the end of that summer term he stood unsuccessfully for the Presidency but was instead elected to the top place on the committee. In his third year (1953–54) he served in top place on the committee, then as Secretary, and finally as Treasurer. As Treasurer he attempted to solve the Union's financial problems not by cost-cutting but by an ultimately successful "Brighter Union" policy of bringing in more students for food and drink, and by converting the Union cellars into a venue for events. The Union's Senior Member (the university don that every society was required to have) resigned in protest at what he saw as Heseltine's profligacy, and was replaced by the young Maurice Shock.

At the end of the Trinity (summer) Term 1954, Heseltine was elected President of the Oxford Union for Michaelmas term 1954, largely on the strength of his business management, and with the assistance of Union contemporaries Jeremy Isaacs and Anthony Howard, the then chairman and chairman-elect of the Oxford University Labour Club; Heseltine had even, for a brief period that term, joined a protest group against the Conservative government's testing of an H-Bomb. (Note: His brief opposition to the H-Bomb caused him some embarrassment as Defence Secretary in 1984, when it was unearthed by The Guardian. He later recorded that he would have been more embarrassed had the newspaper uncovered his support for Aneurin Bevan's foreign policy positions the previous year.[Life in the Jungle pp. 29–35]) He had done little study at University, and passed his finals with the help of last-minute coaching from friends. After graduating with a second-class degree in Philosophy, politics and economics, described by his tutor Neville Ward-Perkins as "a great and undeserved triumph", he was permitted to stay on for an extra term to serve as Union President.

The Union cellars were opened on 30 October 1954, and Heseltine persuaded the visiting Sir Bernard and Lady Docker to contribute to the considerable cost. Debates over which he presided included censorship of the Arts (no vote taken), welcoming the decline of British Imperialism (defeated 281–381) and calling for a "change in the principles and practice of British Trade Unions" (carried 358–200). Guest speakers that term included Rajani Palme Dutt, Lady Violet Bonham Carter, his old headmaster John Wolfenden and Jacob Bronowski, whilst Aneurin Bevan addressed a packed meeting of the University Labour Club, chaired by Anthony Howard, in the Union Chamber.

== Business career ==
=== Early business career ===
Heseltine began articles at Peat Marwick & Mitchell in January 1955. Whilst training as an accountant, he also built up a property business in the London property boom of the late 1950s. He and his Oxford roommate Ian Josephs had each inherited around £1,000 (around £23,000 at 2016 prices). They formed a property company called "Michian" (after their first names) and with the aid of a mortgage bought a 13-year lease on the so-called Thurston Court Hotel at 39 Clanricarde Gardens (near Notting Hill) for £3,750. They evicted the existing tenants so that Josephs' father could renovate the property and let out the rooms for a total rent of around £30 per week. A year later, they were able to sell the property at a profit, doubling their capital to £4,000.

With the aid of a £23,000 mortgage, Heseltine and Josephs now bought a group of five adjacent houses for £27,000 in Inverness Terrace, Bayswater. They arranged for some medical students to decorate and remodel the property into a 45-bedroom boarding house, which they called the "New Court Hotel". Heseltine would sometimes cook breakfast himself, although he rejects tales that he would get up early to mix margarine in with the butter. Many of the tenants were American servicemen who, he later recorded, were for the most part respectful but sometimes rowdy at weekends.

Edward Heath, then a government whip whom he had met at the Oxford Union, was his referee when he applied for the Conservative Party Parliamentary Candidates' List in October 1956. Heseltine bought his first Jaguar, second hand and cheap because of the rise in the price of petrol owing to the Suez Crisis, for £1,750 in December 1956, upgrading to newer and more expensive models in future years.

New Court Hotel was sold in 1957. At this point Heseltine went into business with another Oxford friend, Clive Labovitch, who brought out Opportunities for Graduates that year. Heseltine arranged for this to be distributed free, expanded from 40 pages to a 169-page hardback book, to final year students at all British universities, paid for by advertising. Heseltine ended his partnership with Josephs and with the aid of a £4,500 investment by Heseltine's mother (following the death of his father in 1957) he and Labovitch were able to buy a group of houses at 29–31 Tregunter Road (south of Earl's Court), adding two more in neighbouring Cathcart Road.

=== National service ===
Heseltine had transferred his articles to a partner at a smaller firm of accountants located off Haymarket, feeling that this would allow him more chance of hands-on involvement in the affairs of the firms whose books he examined, rather than being a cog in a bigger machine. It took him three attempts and special coaching to pass his intermediate exams, and he had little immediate prospect of passing his accountancy finals. He also estimated that he was earning more from his property business than the partner to whom he was articled. With the expiry of his articles in January 1958 he could no longer avoid conscription into National Service.

Heseltine later wrote that he admired the military, for his father had been a lieutenant-colonel in the Royal Engineers in the Second World War and active in the Territorial Army thereafter, but that he had felt that his business career was too important to be disrupted. He and his father had taken the precaution of arranging interviews to increase his chances of attaining an officer's commission in case he had to serve. He had been lucky not to be called up for the Korean War in the early 1950s or the Suez Crisis in 1956; and in the final years of National Service, already due for abolition by 1960, an effort was made to call up men who had so far managed to postpone service. Despite having almost reached maximum call-up age, recently reduced from thirty to twenty-six, Heseltine was conscripted into the Welsh Guards in January 1959.

Heseltine spent nine weeks in the ranks as a Guardsman (Note: Army regulations at the time normally required men earmarked for National Service commissions to first serve a period in the ranks. In practice the Guards, like many other regiments, used this to subject its "Potential Officers" to nine weeks of intensive training under Colour Sergeant Peter Horsfall, designed in part to weed out those who were unlikely to make the grade.[Life in the Jungle: pp. 50–3]) before being sent for three months of officer training at Mons Officer Cadet School, Aldershot, alongside men from other regiments. He was a capable cadet, reaching the rank of Junior Under-Officer and graduating with an A-Grade, but he was not awarded the Sword of Honour or promoted to the rank of Senior Under-Officer, as it was felt his age had given him an unfair advantage over younger cadets. Throughout his training he had been troubled by an old ankle sprain, but he declined the offer of a medical discharge. He was commissioned as a second lieutenant on 11 June 1959.

Heseltine was granted leave to contest the general election in October that year; according to Ian Josephs this had been his plan from the start. Afterward he applied on business grounds for exemption from return to the Army, in part because of difficulties caused by an employee's embezzlement, and partly including the need to sort out his late father's affairs, and was exempted from his remaining sixteen months of service. During the 1980s his habit of wearing a Guards regimental tie, sometimes incorrectly knotted with a red stripe on the neck, was the subject of much acerbic comment from military figures and from older MPs with distinguished war records. Crick estimated that he must have worn the tie on more days than he actually served in the Guards.

=== Business career: expansion and near disaster ===
By now the property boom was in full swing. Heseltine and Labovitch established first one, then a group of companies under the name "Bastion Properties". Heseltine later recorded that he and Labovitch bought at least three properties in W1 and W2 which they were able to sell at a profit before they had completed (Note: Purchase of land in England And Wales contains two major milestones: "exchange of contracts", after which a binding agreement exists and the buyer can no longer be gazumped by a higher bidder, and "completion", at which the buyer's solicitor transfers the formal legal title to the land, either by amending the title deeds or, nowadays, by having the Land Registry updated) the original purchases. They also built eight small houses in Queensborough Mews, Bayswater. They bought a 58-year lease on a block of seven properties at Stafford Terrace, off Kensington High Street, which they converted into flats and built houses for Stepney Borough Council. Bastion also planned to build an estate of up to 126 houses (Note: it is unclear whether they actually built as many as this) at Tenterden, Kent, which failed to sell. In order to attract other buyers to the empty estate Heseltine had to accept an offer of £4,000 for the first house, which had been valued at £7,250. The estate was beset with repair problems until after Heseltine's election to Parliament.

Heseltine and Labovitch also founded the magazine publishing company Cornmarket, and brought out Directory of Opportunities for School Leavers and Directory of Opportunities for Qualified Men, which earned a steady income from advertising. Canadian, French and German versions were also launched, although these were less profitable. In late 1959, using £10,000 of a £30,000 profit on selling a freehold site off Regents Park, they acquired the famous (but unprofitable) magazine Man About Town whose title was shortened to About Town then simply Town. In 1962 they paid £10,000 for Topic, a weekly newspaper that had been launched the previous year by a group of entrepreneurs including the prime minister's son Maurice Macmillan, and which was now owned by Norman Mascall (a pyramid scheme fraudster of the era). By then the economic climate was too difficult, and like many publishers they found that there is limited appetite for weekly papers in the UK. Topic ceased publication at the end of 1962, but its journalists later became The Sunday Times Insight Team.

Heseltine became managing director of Bow Group Publications in 1960, mainly looking after advertising and circulation for its Crossbow magazine (he does not seem to have written any articles or pamphlets himself). He contemplated suing The Observer for a limerick mocking his dress sense (spelling "Bow" as "Beau") for implying him to be homosexual, but was talked out of it. He remained a director until 1965.

Bastion Properties was in trouble because of building costs and an unsatisfactory building manager. After rapid expansion, Heseltine's businesses were badly hit by the Selwyn Lloyd financial squeeze of 1961 (Note: Heseltine misdates this to July 1962. In fact the squeeze was a year earlier, in July 1961, and Lloyd was dismissed as chancellor in July 1962.[Life in the Jungle, pp. 70–3]) and, still not yet thirty years old, he eventually owed £250,000 (around £4.5 million at 2016 prices). He states he was lent a badly needed £85,000 in December 1962 by a bank manager who retired the same day. He avoided bankruptcy by such tactics as paying bills only when threatened with legal action, although he eventually settled all his debts. It was during this stressful period of his life that he took up gardening as a serious hobby. Later, during the 1990s, Heseltine committed a minor gaffe when he joked in a speech about how he had strung creditors along.

Between 1960 and 1964, Heseltine also worked as a part-time interviewer for ITV, very likely, in Crick's view, to maintain his public profile as an aspiring politician.

=== Formation of Haymarket ===
Despite Heseltine's later insistence on management controls in government departments which he ran, Cornmarket was a highly disorganised company, with little in the way of accounting or business plans and cheques and invoices often going astray. One of its most lucrative ventures, the Graduates Appointments Register (albums of anonymous graduate CV; companies had to pay for the names and addresses of those whom they wished to interview), went ahead after an employee simply ignored Heseltine's instructions to abandon the project. Heseltine and Labovitch brought a great deal of energy and openness to new ideas (for example the in-house magazine for Hilton Hotels, or new owners' packs for people who bought Ford cars), talent-spotting able young men and leaving it to them to sort out the details.

Lindsay Masters, who had joined the Heseltine-Labovitch publishing business as an advertising manager in spring 1958, and Simon Tindall, who had joined in his early twenties as an advertising salesman while Heseltine had been doing his National Service, played an increasingly large role in managing the company. Masters kept a tight grip on the selling of advertising space, banning boozy lunches and setting targets for calling of clients, followed by chase-up calls, whilst keeping a public league table of salesmens' success rates; these were relatively innovative techniques at the time.

By 1964, Cornmarket owed a great deal of money to their printers, Hazell Watson & Viney, which was then merging with the British Printing Corporation (BPC). Heseltine was summoned by BPC to be told to sort out his firm's debts, but instead persuaded them to accept, instead of payment, an equity stake of at least 40% (Note: Heseltine writes that it was 40%, Crick 49%. Heseltine also omits any mention of the debts and implies that this was a purely voluntary transaction first mooted by their previous printer Keliher, Hudson & Kearns in 1963, and continued by Hazell Watson & Viney after they took over that printer.) in a new, merged business. The portmanteau name "Haymarket" was suggested by Sir Geoffrey Crowther, chairman of BPC.

=== Haymarket grows ===
From the autumn of 1964, Haymarket set out aggressively to acquire magazines, approaching them from the list in the media directory BRAD. They acquired small, modestly profitable magazines for tape recorder and camera, and camping and caravan, enthusiasts, and using a loan from BPC bought a series of leisure and medical publications for £250,000 from a Canadian publisher, in competition with Thomson Group.

In 1965 Heseltine's businesses had a turnover of around £700,000 per annum, and employed around 50 staff. Although the Opportunities for Graduates series continued to generate profits, Town magazine continued to lose money, hampered by the cost of printing (much more expensive at that time than nowadays) and by Heseltine's reluctance, for political reasons, to include pictures of nude girls or cartoons disrespectful of the Royal Family.

Haymarket launched a bid for the British Institute of Management's magazine The Manager, again in competition with Thomson Group, in late 1965. It was envisaged that Haymarket would take a 25% stake, as would the Financial Times and The Economist, of both of which Crowther was also chairman. Over the weekend Heseltine, inspired by how Donald Stokes had once won a Scandinavian bus contract for British Leyland by building a model bus, had a team led by Labovitch prepare a 96-page mock copy of what they envisaged, mostly using text cut from The Economist. Robert Heller was brought in as the first editor of what became Management Today – Heseltine initially irritated him by taking him to lunch at the Carlton Club and talking of his political aspirations, but Heller soon recognised that Labovitch was the front man whose job was to impress those who needed to be impressed, and Heseltine was "the dynamic and real entrepreneurial brain". The first edition came out in April 1966, just after Heseltine's election to Parliament. Haymarket went on to publish similar magazines for Marketing, Personnel Management and Computing Institutes.

Labovitch left Haymarket at the end of 1965. Heseltine stated he spent three days trying to persuade him to stay. Labovitch wanted to establish himself as a successful educational and careers publisher, and may well have been pushed by his then wife, the socialist journalist Penny Perrick, who disliked Heseltine both personally (as best man at their wedding he had, she said, welcomed various business figures in his speech as if he were at a board meeting) and politically and whom he had refused to include on the Haymarket board. Labovitch was a generator of ideas but he lacked Heseltine's business skills. Although he took his profitable Directories with him, he had to sell them back to Haymarket when his business failed in 1973, causing him to attempt suicide. Heseltine offered him a position as consultant to Haymarket. The two former partners remained on friendly terms until Labovitch's death in 1994.

Very few staff left with Labovitch. Lindsay Masters stayed behind, very likely in the knowledge that he might soon be running the company as Heseltine's political career took off. However, Heseltine continued as managing director of Haymarket even after being elected to Parliament in March 1966, and based himself at the company offices near Oxford Circus rather than in the House of Commons. Heseltine's Oxford friend Julian Critchley was editor of Town for around a year from 1966 until he was sacked by Masters, ending his friendship with Heseltine who had shrunk from delivering the blow himself.

=== Further growth ===
In April 1967, Heseltine persuaded BPC to inject a further £150,000 into Haymarket, increasing its ownership stake to 60%, whilst Heseltine and other directors retained smaller shareholdings. Haymarket doubled their magazine portfolio by taking over the management of twenty of BPC's magazines (many of which had been acquired by BPC in lieu of bad debts by other publishers), including Autosport. However, they were now effectively a subsidiary of BPC; Heseltine, Masters and Tindall could potentially be outvoted or even sacked by the four BPC directors on the board. BPC installed a new financial controller who installed cost and cashflow management for the first time, and insisted on finally closing Town magazine at the end of 1967. Town had never made a profit, but Heseltine writes that its quality was instrumental in establishing Haymarket's reputation as a publishing house. Around that time, Management Today became Haymarket's first big success. A BPC manager recorded that Heseltine kept the initiative at board meetings by "poker-faced nit-picking" about the quality and timing of BPC's printing, rather than by employing what came to be considered his usual "I will transform the world" rhetoric.

In 1968, there were rumours that BPC was planning to sack Heseltine. Another of the titles acquired from BPC was World's Press News, largely a compilation of world press releases, which was relaunched by Masters and Robert Heller as Campaign in September 1968 (Heseltine initially opposed the title, thinking it sounded too political). It rapidly became standard reading in the world of advertising and Public Relations, for its gossipy reporting, often obtained by trading information, of who was gaining or losing accounts or being promoted or sacked. Within a year it had overtaken Advertisers Weekly for its volume of classified ads. Heseltine was forced, in the face of a strike, to recognise the National Union of Journalists among his staff. Josephine Hart (later a novelist and the wife of Maurice Saatchi, who was Heseltine's assistant at this time), further improved the advertising sales operation by recruiting a team of largely female sales staff.

As part of his ongoing campaign to buy titles off other publishers, Heseltine noticed a magazine called The Accountant which was easily paid for by vast amounts of advertising. Robert Heller produced a dummy edition of a Haymarket version, modelled on the Daily Telegraph, which became Accountancy Age. Following an international phone call between Heller, who was on holiday in Portugal, and Heseltine who was on a political trip to Singapore, the launch date was brought forward by three months on learning that a rival publication was to be launched. Accountancy Age was launched in December 1969, largely by Haymarket's business development manager Maurice Saatchi, and was profitable from the start.

Buoyed by the success of Management Today, Campaign and Accountancy Age, Haymarket made pre-tax profits of £3,000 in 1968, £136,000 in 1969 and £265,000 in 1970. Heseltine resigned as managing director of Haymarket on his promotion to principal opposition spokesman on transport in 1969, although he continued as chairman of the board until he became a minister in 1970, at which point he resigned from the board altogether, whilst remaining a major shareholder.

=== 1970s: Heseltine takes ownership of Haymarket ===
In 1970, Heseltine turned down the chance to invest £25,000 in the advertising agency Saatchi & Saatchi when it was set up (his former employee Maurice Saatchi said that he had learned a great deal from Heseltine's aggressive techniques of acquiring magazine titles, and from publicity in Campaign magazine), believing wrongly that it was against the code for ministers to make such an investment. Lindsay Masters did invest, but was eventually bought out by the Saatchi brothers; Heseltine later believed that he and Masters together could have made another fortune if they had reinforced one another with large shareholdings in Saatchi and Saatchi.

With Heseltine a government minister from June 1970, Haymarket was being run by Masters and Tindall, who had secured another coup by publishing Computing for the British Computing Society. BPC was in financial trouble in 1971, and Heseltine, Masters and Tindall assembled a consortium of County Bank, Charterhouse Development, ICFC and Wren Investments to help buy out BPC's 60% stake for £1m, a very low price given that Haymarket had made over £250,000 the previous year. The consortium took a 40% stake in Haymarket, and loaned the company £820,000, while Heseltine took out a large personal loan at this time to buy both another 20% of Haymarket's shares (the rest of the BPC shareholding, bringing Heseltine's own shareholding to just under 50%). At the meeting to close the deal, one of the bankers recorded, "Michael thought he was President of the Oxford Union again, and entered into a grand oration and bored everyone stiff". In 1971 Heseltine placed his shares in a trust controlled by his ministerial boss Peter Walker and by his solicitor Charles Corman. Haymarket's pretax profits were £453,000 in 1971 and £704,000 in 1972. Haymarket was due to be floated as a public company in the autumn of 1973, although this was cancelled because of the rise in the oil price, which reduced the profitability of the publishing industry. They thus avoided the stock market crash which followed. The company remains privately owned to this day.

Heseltine acted as a consultant to Haymarket during his period out of government office between 1974 and 1979. His role was to bring in new publishing ideas. He believed he increased performance, although Robert Heller later recorded that he did very little, for he was too busy as a member of the Shadow Cabinet. He worked from an office at Haymarket, near Regent Street, rather than in the House of Commons. Under the management of Masters and Tindall, Haymarket continued to grow. By 1976 it was making annual profits of round £1.75m. In 1976–1977 Heseltine, Masters, Tindall and the Finance Director David Fraser bought out the consortium's 40% share, using money borrowed from them, giving Heseltine and his family over 50% control of Haymarket. Heseltine had taken out large personal loans both to increase his stake in the company and to buy his country mansion Thenford House. Masters had also done the same to buy himself a property. Several titles, including Accountancy Age and Computing were sold to the rival company VNU in 1980. The transaction raised £17m, half of which went to Heseltine, but in Crick's view was a bad move for Haymarket. During Heseltine's second period out of office (1986–1990), Masters threatened to resign if Heseltine returned to Haymarket, but once again he became a consultant on £100,000 per annum.

=== After 1997: return to business ===
By 1997, when his career as a Cabinet minister ended, Haymarket was making an annual profit of over £10m and employing around 1,000 people. Heseltine resumed management of the company after Masters' retirement in 1999. Haymarket has seen reduced profitability in the UK since 1999, but has expanded further into foreign markets (for example India). It has also laboured under heavy borrowings of over £100 million to buy back Masters' and Tindall's large minority shareholdings, which have been reduced to some extent by the sale of properties. Heseltine has now retired from day-to-day management, handing over to his son Rupert.

Heseltine's ownership of Haymarket has made him a large personal fortune. As of 2013 he was ranked 311th in The Sunday Times Rich List with an estimated wealth, including shareholdings held by members of his immediate family, of £264 million.

== Electoral history and Parliamentary career ==
=== Gower 1959 and Coventry 1964 ===
Heseltine contested the safe Labour seat of Gower at the October 1959 general election. He had been the only applicant for the Conservative (technically, Conservative and National Liberal) (Note: The National Liberals had been a breakaway group under Sir John Simon, who sat in coalition with the Conservatives between 1931 and 1945. By the 1950s they had merged with the Conservatives for practical purposes, but the name was still used locally in some seats.) candidacy. He would at times attend Labour meetings and attempt to heckle the speakers, including Aneurin Bevan and the Labour candidate Ifor Davies, whom he kept trying to challenge to a debate. He obtained plenty of publicity in the local paper and obtained a swing to the Conservatives slightly better than the national average.

In 1961 Heseltine was one of 29 applicants—of whom half were interviewed—for the Conservative candidacy in the marginal constituency of Coventry North. He clinched the selection after bringing his fiancée Anne Williams to the meeting. He got on well with the incumbent Labour member Maurice Edelman (whose daughter was a friend of Anne Heseltine, as she became in 1962) and they met for dinner sometimes during the campaign. Many of his Oxford contemporaries had already entered Parliament, but, to his disappointment, in the 1964 general election he was defeated by 3,530 votes. The swing to Labour was slightly less than the national average.

=== Selection for Tavistock ===
In March 1965, Heseltine applied to be candidate for the safe Conservative seat of Tavistock in Devon, where the incumbent MP had announced his retirement two months earlier. Of the 51 applicants, 14 were considered, six of whom had local connections. Heseltine reached the final short list of three, the others being a dairy farmer in a senior position at the Milk Marketing Board (thought to be the favourite), and a local authority lawyer, who later recalled that on the train down from London Heseltine kept jumping out at every stop to check that his magazines were on display at the station newsagents. Heseltine had already spent several days driving round talking to locals and had ordered a year's worth of back copies of Tavistock's two weekly papers. Such effort is nowadays common in Parliamentary selections but was unusual at the time. He was selected by a clear majority of the Tavistock Conservative Association's Finance and General Purposes Committee (which contained between 100 and 120 people).

Heseltine was picked in part as a young, dynamic candidate who could face the challenge of the resurgent Liberal Party in the West Country, where Jeremy Thorpe, Peter Bessell and Mark Bonham Carter had recently won seats. The Liberals had halved the Conservative majority at Tavistock in 1964.

Trouble then arose at his adoption by a full general meeting of the Conservative Association, which should have been a formality. Criticism arose that a person with farming links should have been chosen, for the bikini-clad girls on the cover of Town magazine, which were considered risqué at the time, and for jokes in the magazine at the expense of the Royal Family. He was selected after a stirring speech to around 540 assembled members of the local Conservative Association on Friday 26 March 1965. Crick believes that this is a rare example in politics of a single speech determining a career. Only 27 members supported an amendment to refer the matter back to the selection committee and 14 opposed Heseltine's adoption altogether. Thereafter his name stopped appearing as "publisher" on his magazines. He had to learn about farming, an important issue in the seat, about which he knew almost nothing.

=== MP for Tavistock: 1966–74 ===
In the March 1966 general election both the Conservative leader Edward Heath and Liberal leader Jo Grimond spoke at Tavistock. Heseltine stressed his agreement with Liberal principles and fought extremely hard, achieving a small swing to the Conservatives, bucking the national trend. He was elected Member of Parliament (MP) for Tavistock.

Heseltine's liberal stance on race issues and his opposition to hanging (he felt it was barbaric and not an effective deterrent, although he later expressed openness to the idea of hanging terrorists) was unpopular with many of his constituents, as was his continued unease with agricultural issues, and his dressing as a city businessman in pale grey suits, kipper ties and driving a Jaguar. Despite the huge demands on his time as both an MP and running Haymarket Press, and the distance of the seat from London, he remained relatively active at constituency casework at weekends and during the late summer recess, touring rural areas in a caravan and using a small tape recorder (relatively new technology at the time) to dictate answers to constituents' problems in front of them.

As soon as Heseltine was elected in March 1966, the seat of Tavistock was recommended for abolition by the Boundary Commission, divided between the new seats of West Devon (effectively a rural seat, where Heseltine would have had to compete for the candidacy with the sitting MP Peter Mills who had a strong local following) and Plymouth Sutton (which had a strong Powellite/Monday Club element—they eventually selected the right-winger Alan Clark). Several of his activists attempted to persuade him to apply for Plymouth Sutton, but he was not interested, wanting a seat nearer London.

In the event, the implementation of the Boundary Review was postponed for partisan reasons until after the next general election by Home Secretary James Callaghan (on the pretext of waiting until after the Redcliffe-Maud Report on local government reorganisation). Heseltine therefore defended Tavistock at the 1970 general election, achieving a better than average swing to the Conservatives.

=== MP for Henley: 1974–2001 ===
Heseltine, by now a junior minister in the Heath government, was now forced to apply for a new candidacy, often in competition with other sitting Conservative MPs whose seats were also due for abolition. He applied for Mid Sussex in competition with Ian Gilmour, but they lost to Tim Renton. He also applied for Mid-Oxfordshire but lost to Douglas Hurd.

In 1972 Edward Heath attempted to persuade Heseltine, a strong supporter of his, to challenge Powellite MP Ronald Bell for the Conservative nomination for the new seat of Beaconsfield. Heseltine wrote that he was "tempted" to enter the lists at Beaconsfield, but did not actually do so. Crick writes that he reached the final shortlist of four against Bell, before being "apparently persuaded" to withdraw. Bell's campaign within the local Conservative ranks was masterminded by Hugh Simmonds, chairman of the Young Conservatives, and he narrowly won.

Heseltine was one of 180 applicants for the safe Conservative seat of Henley (the constituency association of which was known as North Oxfordshire), whose MP John Hay was stepping down. He reached the final shortlist of three along with two other sitting MPs, William Shelton and Norman Fowler, and in September 1972 was selected as candidate with a clear majority at the first ballot. Part of the reason was that the Association wanted a wealthy MP who would not be distracted by the need to earn money in business as Hay had been. He maintained a constituency home in Crocker End, near Nettlebed, and still maintained a London home at Wilton Crescent. The constituency is around 40 miles west of central London, and has excellent transport links, making it a prime residential area for London-based professionals.

Heseltine was MP for Henley from February 1974 until his retirement from the House of Commons in 2001.

== Career under Heath: 1966–74 ==
=== Opposition front bencher: 1967–70 ===
In 1967, Peter Walker invited Heseltine to be opposition spokesman on transport (not a Shadow Cabinet-level position, but reporting to Walker), after he had arranged a successful speaking tour of the West Country for him. Heseltine's duties included opposing Barbara Castle's 1967 Transport Bill (which eventually became the Transport Act 1968). Heseltine led opposition to the parts of the bill which nationalised small bus companies into the National Bus Company (UK) and set up Passenger transport executives (PTEs) in major urban areas. He criticised Castle for wanting to give PTEs the right to manufacture or produce anything necessary for their function, which as she pointed out was almost word-for-word identical to a clause in the Conservatives' Transport Act 1962. In 1968 Margaret Thatcher became Heseltine's boss for a year; he found her "embarrassingly rude". Unusually for the time, he employed a full-time researcher, Eileen Strathnaver.

Heath allowed his shadow ministers more leeway than would be normal nowadays. Heseltine was one of a group of 15 Conservative MPs to vote against the 1968 Commonwealth Immigration Bill on second reading (Conservative whips advised their MPs to support it, but it was a free vote). He also voted against the bill on three subsequent votes, arguing that it was based on "sheer naked racialism" and that Britain should honour promises previously made to the Kenyan Asians. Following Enoch Powell's Rivers of Blood speech Heseltine publicly urged Heath to deal firmly with him—to the consternation of many in his local party at Tavistock, where Powell enjoyed strong support. Three days later, Heseltine was one of around two dozen Conservative MPs who defied the whip to abstain rather than vote against the second reading of the 1968 Race Relations Bill (which banned racial discrimination). He argued that the Conservatives should state their own alternative policy rather than just oppose.

Heseltine was promoted to principal opposition spokesman on transport in November 1969, although unlike his predecessors Thatcher and Walker, he was not a member of the Shadow Cabinet. He went on a six-week tour of India, Hong Kong, Singapore, Australia and the US to study how their docks were run, in readiness for Labour's planned 1970 Docks Bill (which in the event was cancelled because of that year's general election).

=== Minister: 1970–74 ===
==== Transport and Local Government ====
Following the Conservative victory in the 1970 general election, new prime minister Edward Heath appointed Heseltine a junior minister at the Department of Transport. Transport had been demoted from a Cabinet position in 1969, when Barbara Castle had been replaced by Fred Mulley. To his disappointment Heseltine, who had been principal spokesman in opposition, was appointed a Parliamentary Under-Secretary, the lowest rung on the ministerial ladder, to John Peyton (himself only a minister of state rather than a Cabinet minister). Officials found him brash, arrogant and overbearing, with a very limited attention span for paperwork, although quick to complain if he was not told about things (the trick, they found, was to submit the two-page summaries on each topic which he demanded, but with extensive background documents). He complained to Lord Jellicoe, Minister for the Civil Service, about being given inexperienced civil servants fresh out of university to work in his office. "Pussy – that's what they called us. The scum of the earth, tolerated by civil servants" he told the Sunday Times (1 May 1983). One of his first duties was to open the Westway A40 (M), and he also opened the stretch of the M4 west of Maidenhead, on which he was shortly afterwards fined £20 for speeding. He insisted on being shown maps' of where protesters lived, so that he could see the reasons for public concerns at new roads and motorways.

Following four months Transport was absorbed into the new "monster ministry" of the Department for the Environment, under Heseltine's ally Peter Walker. Heseltine was still responsible for transport, but also for local government reform, covered in the Local Government Act 1972. Redcliffe-Maude's proposals for unitary councils (i.e. merging the two layers of county and borough/district councils) were abandoned. Many historic counties were abolished. Large Metropolitan counties were created around the big cities, but many smaller cities lost their county borough status. One such was Plymouth, the eastern suburbs of which lay in Heseltine's seat of Tavistock. Plymouth opinion was particularly angry that education was now to be run by Devon County Council in Exeter, 40 miles away. Heseltine declined to support a campaign by Plymouth MP Dame Joan Vickers to create a Tamarside Metropolitan county, and was rebuked by Sir Henry Studholme, his predecessor as MP for Tavistock, for declining to support (on the grounds that as minister he might have to adjudicate any dispute) Plymouth Council's attempt to buy more land near Sparkwell to develop light industry under its control.

==== Aerospace ====
In April 1972 Heseltine was promoted to be minister for aerospace, a minister of state rather than a Cabinet minister but effectively running his own department within the Department of Trade and Industry, another of Heath's new mega ministries. The department had been given major new powers by the 1972 Industry Act. Later in the year Peter Walker was appointed Secretary of State for Trade and Industry, making him Heseltine's boss once again. Heseltine appointed Cecil Parkinson, whom he had met on an accountancy course in the mid-1950s, as his Parliamentary Private Secretary, ostensibly on the grounds that he knew even less about aerospace than he did. Parkinson was impressed by Heseltine's vigour and his insistence that civil servants produce results for him quickly, later writing in his memoirs (1992) "in his constructive and deliberate unreasonableness he reminds me in many ways of Mrs Thatcher". Heseltine arguably did not make aerospace policy any more interventionist than it already was.

One of Heseltine's main jobs was to sell Concorde, which was difficult because of its cost and limited range (it could fly from New York to London or Paris, but not the short extra distance to Rome or Frankfurt) and capacity (a quarter that of a Boeing 747). It had been initiated by Macmillan in 1962 as an Anglo-French project to try to get Britain into the EEC, although by the early 1970s Heath was already broaching cancellation with President Pompidou. BOAC threatened to cancel its order, and Heseltine several times summoned the board, who had threatened to resign en masse, to his office, impressing Parkinson by his skills of persuasion. Civil servants were happy that his love of generating headlines helped the cause of Concorde sales. The queen, Princess Margaret and Princess Anne were all seen accompanying Heseltine on board Concorde to drum up publicity. In the summer of 1972 he sent Concorde 002 on a tour of Iran, India, Singapore, Japan and Australia. Heseltine and his wife Anne accompanied the plane as far as Singapore (the press joked that Lee Kuan Yew might not let him in with such long hair), and he met it at Toulouse on the way back, but not a single plane was sold. By this stage there were options to sell 74 Concordes to 17 airlines around the world (the original hope had been to sell 30), but this went wrong because of the rises in the oil price in 1973 and 1979; in the event only 10 were ever sold, five each to British Airways (as BOAC had become in 1974) and Air France. Heseltine won praise for his efforts at salesmanship, but some civil servants felt that he was more committed to the plane than Tony Benn had been, and that he should have acted decisively to cut back marketing efforts sooner than he did. He did not mention Concorde at all in his books Where There's A Will or The Challenge of Europe.

Heseltine was a key mover in the setting up of the European Space Agency (ESA) in 1973. He cancelled the British Geostationary Technological satellite and handed back the grant to the Treasury. He was less successful in persuading colleagues to centralise British space expenditure, which was split between the DTI, Defence, the Post Office and the Science Research Council – his attempt to get Margaret Thatcher, Secretary of State for Education and Science, to give up control of the latter, soured their relations. He also favoured pan European cooperation on civil aviation.

Heseltine had almost daily dealings with the industrialist Arnold Weinstock, Head of GEC – as transport minister Heseltine had once summoned him in to the ministry to ask why the electronic signs on the motorway, built by GEC, did not work properly. By May 1973, Weinstock was thought by Cecil King to have a very low opinion of Heseltine, but this later improved and they became friends. Heseltine had started almost from nothing, but Haymarket had only succeeded when bought out by the big conglomerate BPC. This may explain his corporatism, in Crick's view, although unlike Jim Prior or Heath, Heseltine had never shown much interest in involving trade unions.

During this period, Heseltine's opponent Stanley Clinton-Davis coined his nickname of Tarzan, due to his similarity to Johnny Weissmuller, the actor who had played Tarzan in a number of films in the 1930s and 1940s. The media were quick to follow in Clinton-Davis's example. He was caricatured as such, complete with loin-cloth, in the If series drawn by satirical political cartoonist Steve Bell. Heseltine has claimed never to have been bothered what people called him, although the nickname amused his wife: "It was quite fun to be married to Johnny Weissmuller".

==== Hovertrain ====
Early in 1973, rumours began to circulate that the Tracked Hovercraft (known as the "Hovertrain"), a planned 300 mph floating train on which work had begun in 1967, was to be cancelled. On 12 February 1973, Heseltine gave a written answer on Peter Walker's behalf to a written question from Labour MP David Stoddart, that a further injection of government money was still "under consideration". However, two days later Heseltine appeared before the Select Committee, and revealed that the government had already decided to pull the plug on the Hovertrain on 29 January. Airey Neave believed Heseltine had been lying and urged Stoddart to pursue the matter. The Hovertrain incident came to be regarded as the worst example of lying to the House of Commons since the Profumo affair a decade earlier, and Heseltine survived because full details only emerged during the Parliamentary summer recess.

The committee's report in September accused Heseltine of having given an "untrue" answer on 12 February. Heseltine immediately gave a press conference (7 September 1973) in which he denied that he had lied. On the orders of Chief Whip Francis Pym he apologised to the House of Commons on 16 October 1973 for having made a statement which was open to "more than one interpretation". Heseltine said that his statement that further investment was "under consideration" was not just the normal euphemism for a decision that had not yet been announced, but was actually technically true, as at that time he was still talking to Hawker Siddeley and British Rail about buying part of the Hovertrain business. The row deflected attention from the committee's anger at the cancellation decision. Neave's real target, in the view of Heseltine's PPS Cecil Parkinson, was Heath, whom Neave detested and later helped to topple as party leader in 1975, but he and Sir Harry Legge-Bourke, both of whom had distinguished war records, also deplored Heseltine's cutting short of his National Service and his brashness and new money.

Heath does not appear to have been overly bothered about the cancellation of Hovertrain, but was bothered about the mooted third London Airport at Maplin Sands on the Essex Coast, which was seen as a major prestige project along with the Channel Tunnel which was begun at this time. The Bill was threatened by a revolt of Tory backbenchers whose seats were affected, and Heath gave Heseltine a dressing down for his lack of energy in promoting it.

==== Assessments ====
Heseltine was not popular with his ministerial peers at this time. A story was told of how ministers had volunteered him to be the one "taken hostage by terrorists" in a mooted training exercise. Nonetheless, Heseltine emerged from the Heath government with an enhanced reputation. He had avoided the worst crises of that government: the two miners' strikes, incomes policy, industrial relations policy and Northern Ireland, as well as any direct involvement in British entry into the EEC. Heseltine's career under Heath's ministry saw him associated with local government reorganisation, prestige projects, Europe and state aid to industries, themes which would recur throughout his career. He had attained a higher public profile than many Cabinet ministers, and by 1974 he was being seriously tipped as a future prime minister.

Heseltine was promoted to the Shadow Cabinet in June 1974 as Industry spokesman. If the Conservatives had won either of the general elections in 1974 (February or October) he would almost certainly have joined the Cabinet. He was shadowing Tony Benn, who planned a major expansion of public ownership through the National Enterprise Board. In the summer of 1974, Heseltine put together a team of over 20 Conservative MPs, each a specialist in a particular industry, to campaign against Benn's plans.

=== 1975 leadership election ===
Heseltine had lost faith in Heath over the second miners' strike and over Heath's personal abrasiveness (Heath had apparently once told him to his face that he was too openly ambitious); his patron Peter Walker had also come to have similar doubts about Heath. Ten days before the October 1974 election, at which Heseltine bucked the national swing by increasing his majority at Henley, he urged Heath to consider his position by the end of the year.

It is unclear how Heseltine voted in the first ballot of the 1975 Conservative leadership election, in which the challenger Margaret Thatcher defeated Heath. Norman Tebbit stated that he and John Nott persuaded him to vote for Thatcher so as to open up the way for his preferred candidate Willie Whitelaw to stand on the second ballot. Another (anonymous) close friend later told Michael Crick that Heseltine voted for Thatcher. The Thatcher team had him down as an abstainer, while he refused at the time to reveal how he voted. In his memoirs Heseltine wrote that he abstained in the first ballot, but that he would have voted for Whitelaw in the first ballot had he stood against Heath. Whitelaw admired his drive and energy but looked down on him as "new Money" and is said to have commented that Heseltine was "the sort of man who combs his hair in public".

Heseltine toyed with standing himself for the second ballot (in Crick's view his vote would very likely have been derisory), but voted for Whitelaw. Thatcher, whom Heseltine like many others had initially regarded as something of a joke candidate, defeated Whitelaw and became party leader.

== Career under Thatcher: 1975–86 ==
=== Opposition: 1975–79 ===
Heseltine did not work easily with women as senior colleagues, as was shown by the difficulty experienced by Elinor Goodman in obtaining promotion from secretary to journalist at Campaign, and his reluctance to let Josephine Hart sit on the Haymarket Board. Heseltine fully expected to be sacked from the Shadow Cabinet by the new leader (as Peter Walker was at this time), but was retained, in part because Thatcher was impressed by his fierce opposition to Benn's Industry Bill, and partly because a senior figure, possibly Geoffrey Howe, argued for his retention.

Heseltine first emerged as a platform orator at the Conservative National Council in March 1975, and then at the autumn conferences in 1975 and 1976 (where he likened Labour to a one-legged army marching "Left, left, left"). He dictated his speech ideas beforehand to his scriptwriters, who had to discard a good deal of unintelligible material. His reputation was derived not from any factual content or argument, but from the force and brio of his delivery – it was said of him that he could "find the party's clitoris". There was talk of his being appointed Party Chairman (in charge of the party organisation and of campaigning across the country) in place of Peter Thorneycroft.

In the summer of 1975, Heseltine persuaded the Shadow Cabinet not to oppose the Labour Government's bailout of British Leyland because of the risk to marginal seats (including some Cowley workers in northern wards of his own Henley seat). Industry Secretary Tony Benn thought Heseltine intellectually shallow (describing one of his speeches as "an awful old flop" and another as "another flayling attack") but admired his ability to make headlines in opposition.

The infamous mace incident took place on 27 May 1976 during the Labour government Aircraft and Shipbuilding Industries Bill to nationalise those industries, this measure had already lasted a year and seen 58 Committee sessions. The Speaker had ruled the bill to be hybrid, as it excluded one shipbuilding company (although there was dispute as to whether the company in question actually was a shipbuilder). All interested parties were therefore entitled to put their case to a special select committee. An earlier vote in favour of the Speaker's ruling had been tied, and defeated after the Speaker had been obliged by convention to use his casting vote against his own ruling. The Labour Government now moved to suspend the normal Parliamentary standing order to allow the bill to proceed as normal. This time the Conservatives expected the Speaker to use his casting vote against the government's motion to suspend the standing order. Instead the Labour motion was carried, after a Labour whip broke his pair. Amid riotous scenes of Labour left-wingers singing The Red Flag Heseltine picked up the Mace, the symbol of Parliament's authority, until Jim Prior grabbed it off him. Accounts of exactly what happened vary but it seems likely that he was mockingly offering it to the Labour benches, not, as some alleged, "brandishing" it – an illusion caused by Prior pulling his other arm down. Thatcher was furious. Speaker Thomas suspended the sitting and made Heseltine wait until next day to apologise so that tempers could cool. Heseltine was faced with calls for his resignation from the Shadow Cabinet; he thought it would play well with the public, but in Crick's view it helped to cement a reputation for impulsiveness and poor judgement.

In autumn 1976 Heseltine was reshuffled, against his will, to the job of Shadow Environment Secretary. He was particularly cross at having to give up the job of Shadow Industry Secretary to John Biffen. He accepted on condition that he would not have to take the Environment job when the Conservatives returned to office. As Benn had given way to Eric Varley there was no longer such a need for aggressive campaigning on Industry, and Thatcher, who had herself been Shadow Environment Secretary in 1974, wanted him to campaign on council house sales (Heseltine offered up to 50% discounts for tenants who bought their homes) and reform of the rates, as she thought his predecessor Timothy Raison ineffective.

=== Secretary of State for the Environment 1979–83 ===
==== Appointment and political stance ====
Thatcher was impressed by Heseltine's campaigning and love of headlines during the May 1979 election, in contrast to most of the Shadow Cabinet. After the Conservatives had won, and mindful of her earlier promise that he need not take on the Environment job in government, she offered him the Energy Department (an important job following the 1979 energy crisis caused by the Iranian Revolution). He preferred to be Secretary of State for the Environment after all, entering the Cabinet for the first time.

During the macroeconomic disputes of the early 1980s, Heseltine was sometimes associated with the Cabinet "wets" (Peter Walker, Jim Prior, Ian Gilmour, Lord Carrington and Norman St John Stevas) but was not seen as one of them, nor was he invited to their private meetings. Both Nigel Lawson and Cecil Parkinson agreed in their memoirs (1992) that he accepted in principle the need to control public expenditure. He opposed the abolition of exchange controls in 1979 and opposed Geoffrey Howe's tight budget in 1981, suggesting a public sector pay freeze instead.

Heseltine favoured privatisation of state owned industries, a novel idea in 1979 as the Conservatives were initially only proposing to denationalise the industries nationalised by Labour in the 1970s.

Despite his initial reluctance to take on the job, Heseltine later described it as "four of the happiest years of my life". He passed the Wildlife and Countryside Act 1981, a conservation measure. He also vetoed the "Green Giant", a skyscraper on the South Bank, initiated plans for the National Gallery extension (the winning entry was famously described by Prince Charles as "a monstrous carbuncle" and was never built) and signed off on the building of the Queen Elizabeth II Centre on a bomb site near Westminster; when he was unable to secure private funding as planned the Treasury were forced to pay for the building. Some of the DoE's responsibilities were hived off into English Heritage, a new body.

==== Administering the department ====
The permanent under-secretary at the Environment Department, Sir John Garlick, described Heseltine's arrival as a change from "a very conservative Labour secretary of state, Peter Shore, to a very radical Conservative Secretary of State". On his first day Heseltine took him out to lunch at the Connaught and drew up a list of what he wanted to accomplish in office (the list appears in Heseltine's book Where There's A Will, and was returned to him at the end of his time at the Environment). Only a quarter of Heseltine's agenda consisted of manifesto commitments and other political goals; the rest of it consisted of administrative and organisational changes. Peter Hennessy observed that Heseltine was more interested in the nuts and bolts of Whitehall reform than any minister since David Lloyd George. Heseltine was quite ruthless about moving civil servants with whom he was dissatisfied, but nonetheless staff thought he had mellowed somewhat since the early 1970s, and was more relaxed and fun to work with. His permanent secretaries Sir John Garlick and Sir George Moseley thought highly of him. He preferred to reach decisions through informal discussion rather than wading through paperwork. He instituted Peter Walker's custom of morning "prayer" meetings (ministers and PPSs with no civil servants present), now common in Whitehall but an innovation at the time.

The department had a budget of £14 billion a year and employed 52,000 people. The Conservatives were pledged to cut 100,000 off the 730,000 strong civil service. On the advice of his junior minister Lord Bellwin, a former leader of Leeds City Council, Heseltine ordered that nobody was to be hired without his personal approval.

Heseltine instituted an internal audit system called "MINIS" ("management information system for ministers"), ironically, in Crick's view, as Heseltine's own company Haymarket had often been chaotically organised. Peter Hennessy likened it to "a Domesday Book". Heseltine personally interrogated the heads of department (many of whom felt he was interfering in internal civil service matters). The lengthy reports, showing organisation charts of each of the 66 directorates, expenditure, staff costs and forward plans, were made publicly available. Staff numbers were cut more deeply than in any other Whitehall department; one in twelve had gone within a year and nearly 30%, 15,000, by 1983; local government finance, under Terry Heiser, was the only department to receive extra resources. Thatcher was impressed by MINIS, and in February 1983 Heseltine was invited to give a presentation about them to other senior ministers and civil servants, in the hope that they might be adopted by other departments. There was little interest, but similar concepts were later adopted by Derek Rayner's Financial Management Initiative across Whitehall.

==== Council house sales ====
Heseltine was a convert to the sale of council houses, a policy pioneered by some Conservative local authorities, e.g. Birmingham. He also favoured the policy of giving away houses, a policy first mooted from the backbenches by Peter Walker in the mid-1970s, not least as some local authorities were spending more on maintenance than they were recouping in rents. Thatcher, who was concerned at the reaction from those who had made financial sacrifices to buy their homes, was initially sceptical. After taking office Heseltine issued a circular enabling councils, if they chose, to sell houses at 30% discount and to offer 100% mortgages. The Housing Act 1980 enacting Right to Buy was delayed by a Lords amendment and did not reach the statute book until the end of 1980. Some councils were slow in processing applications (one even threatened to house "problem" families next door to those who bought) and Heseltine made an example of Norwich by setting up a DOE sales office there; Norwich council took him to court and lost. At the time Heseltine permitted councils to use up to 75% of sales receipts for renovating the housing stock, and was angry in later years when this was cut back by the Treasury. Heseltine also insisted on the doubling of rents to encourage buying.

During the 1980s over a million council houses, around 20% of the stock, were sold, and by 1987 Labour had dropped their opposition to the Right to Buy. This was an enormous social change, doing much to increase Conservative support amongst new homeowners and which Heseltine often cites as one of his major achievements. Heseltine noted that, "no single piece of legislation has enabled the transfer of so much capital wealth from the state to the people." He said that the 'right to buy' policy had two main objectives: to give people what they had wanted, and to reverse the trend of ever-increasing dominance of the State over the life of the individual. He said: "There is in this country a deeply ingrained desire for home ownership. The Government believe that this spirit should be fostered. It reflects the wishes of the people, ensures the wide spread of wealth through society, encourages a personal desire to improve and modernize one's own home, enables parents to accrue wealth for their children and stimulates the attitudes of independence and self-reliance that are the bedrock of a free society." Many of the homes sold were "street properties" rather than flats, which arguably helped to ghettoise the remaining council tenants on run-down inner city estates. In fact, in Crick's view, he deserves only limited credit; it had been a Conservative commitment since 1974, and much of the detailed work was done by his juniors Hugh Rossi (in opposition) and John Stanley (in government).

==== Local government finance ====
In 1979 the Conservatives were strongly represented in local government, as a result of the unpopularity of the outgoing Labour government. Four of the five council associations were Conservative-controlled. Heseltine was able to persuade them to rein in their spending by 1% each year. Whereas previously overspending councils had received extra rate support grants from Whitehall, after six months Heseltine announced a list of fourteen overspending councils who were to have their grant cut, most of them inner London councils and only one of them, Hammersmith & Fulham, Conservative controlled. The move appeared blatantly political as many of the other 114 overspenders were Conservative councils. Council leaders who came to appeal to Heseltine were often humiliated by being interrogated about their budget, to demonstrate their lack of detailed knowledge, before the council treasurer was allowed to speak.

From 1980 to 1981 relations with local government became increasingly confrontational, as Labour made large gains in local elections, with a new generation of council leaders such as Ken Livingstone in London and David Blunkett in Sheffield seeking to generate employment through their councils. Council spending now began to rise again, largely as a result of increases by the GLC, Merseyside and West Midlands councils; whereas Labour votes tended to be poorer and eligible for rate rebates, the burden of higher spending tended to fall on businesses and middle class homeowners. Although councils had already suffered deep cuts under Labour in the 1970s, Heseltine was under pressure from Thatcher and from Conservative MPs and newspapers to cut more. Heseltine's initial suggestion, that councils who wanted to increase the rates be forced to submit to re-election, was rejected by the Cabinet, in favour of a proposal that such increases be put to referendum (in Coventry, voters had recently voted by over 7:1 for spending cuts rather than a supplementary rate increase). This proposal in turn was attacked by Conservative backbenchers, both as an infringement of council freedom and a risky precedent for national taxation, both in the Environment Committee and in the debate on a bill which Heseltine introduced and had to withdraw. Heseltine then banned supplementary rates and imposed stiffer sanctions on overspending councils.

Thatcher's 1974 pledge to abolish the rates and replace them with a new form of local government funding was still in force. However, the 1979 manifesto made clear that income tax cuts took priority over rates reform. Thatcher also blocked the upward revaluation of property rating values in 1982. A review of rates reform was begun in 1981, in which his junior minister Tom King personally spoke to every single backbench Conservative MP to canvass opinion about the various options. A Green Paper was produced in December 1981, recommending that no single alternative to the rates suggested itself. Thatcher wrote "I will not tolerate failure in this area" in the margin of the report and in the summer of 1982 a new committee was set up under Willie Whitelaw, only to come to much the same conclusion (The eventual solution, a "poll tax", was rejected both by the Green Paper and by Whitelaw's committee).

Heseltine resisted demands by Leon Brittan, the Chief Secretary to the Treasury with whom he already enjoyed a somewhat antagonistic relationship, that central government have power to cap the spending of local authorities. He argued that the worst offenders were the large metropolitan counties (which, ironically, he had helped to create a decade earlier) and that the simplest solution was simply to abolish them. In the event, the 1983 manifesto, after Heseltine had moved to his next job, committed the Conservatives both to abolition of the metropolitan boroughs and to rate capping. When Heseltine objected after the election, Thatcher gave him "one of the most violent rebukes I have ever witnessed in Cabinet" according to Jim Prior, who believed that the issue helped fuel the hostility between Heseltine and Thatcher and Brittan, which would later exhibit itself as the Westland Affair.

In opposition, in the late 1970s, Heseltine had been committed to reducing central government control over local government. In the 1980s, the opposite happened, with no less than 50 Acts of Parliament reducing the powers of local government. In Crick's view, although he opposed both rate capping and the poll tax, the overall trend towards centralisation was too strong for him to resist. During his time at Environment Heseltine also brought in compulsory competitive tendering for council services, and helped set up the Audit Commission, whose initial role was to act as an independent supervisor of district auditors of council activities.

==== Riots ====
Heseltine became the troubleshooter to deal with the explosion of violence in Britain's inner cities in the aftermath of the Brixton and Toxteth riots of 1981. Unemployment had reached 20% in Liverpool as a whole, but 60% among young black residents in Toxteth. Tear gas had had to be used, and the Cabinet contemplated deploying the Army. A few weeks before the riots, a Cabinet thinktank had proposed that the area be left to go into "managed decline". Thatcher visited Merseyside and it was decided that a minister should go for a longer visit. Heseltine was already chairman of the Merseyside Partnership, set up by his predecessor Peter Shore, to channel government money into Liverpool (six other partnerships existed).

Heseltine visited Liverpool accompanied by a dozen or so officials from different ministries. Timothy Raison, a junior Home Office minister, went ostensibly to check on race matters but actually to ensure that Heseltine did not interfere in police matters. Heseltine visited council estates, often accompanied by gangs of grinning children trying to be noticed on television, and his flamboyance as a self-made man went down surprisingly well in a City famous for turning out flamboyant figures in the entertainment industry. He talked to black community leaders, who complained about police bias and brutality, and he later had an awkward private meeting with the chief constable Kenneth Oxford about the matter. He arranged for the bosses of the leading banks and building societies to tour the area in a coach (they were reluctant until Heseltine's PPS Tim Sainsbury persuaded Robin Leigh-Pemberton of NatWest to come), and asked them to each second a bright young manager to the DOE for a year.

Heseltine circulated a 21-page minute to Cabinet on his return, entitled It Took a Riot. He proposed a regional office and a review of the status of the Metropolitan Counties, as well as greater government emphasis on Merseyside in future. He had prepared the ground with a small dinner for Whitehall mandarins including Robert Armstrong (Cabinet Secretary) and Ian Bancroft (Head of the Civil Service). However, Thatcher was not impressed, although she agreed to his appointment as Minister for Merseyside for twelve months. Neither was Keith Joseph (Secretary of State for Industry) nor Howe (Chancellor of the Exchequer), who favoured enterprise zones where businesses would be given favourable tax treatment.

Shortly after his appointment as Minister for Merseyside, Heseltine gave his annual party conference speech, in which he condemned talk of repatriation and called for more public spending on inner cities. Although he felt he had taken a risk – the speech was in marked contrast to Norman Tebbit's "On Your Bike" speech a few hours later – he received his usual standing ovation and later recorded that it was the one of his speeches of which he was most proud.

In autumn 1981 he visited Liverpool again, this time with a thirty-strong task force of representatives of local employers and civil servants (unusually for the time, drawn from different departments – DOE, DTI and Employment, but not the Home Office this time – Heseltine had been pushing for greater cooperation between departments since the setting up of the European Space Agency in 1973). For the next fifteen months he visited Liverpool for a day almost every week, refusing police protection and often driving himself, persuading business and local government to work together. Colette Bowe, a DTI official who was deputy director of the task force, recorded that Heseltine was the most effective minister she had ever seen at getting the official machine to do his bidding through a mixture of charm and tough questions.

==== Inner city development ====
Heseltine faced initial suspicion from Labour-led Merseyside Council, but got on well with Sir Trevor Jones, Liberal leader of Liverpool City Council. Jones, also a self-made businessman said Heseltine admitted to him late one night that he was a Liberal at heart, but could not bear the thought of having no realistic chance to win power.

Inspired by the Bundesgartenschauen which had helped to regenerate German cities after the war, Heseltine arranged for the first of five biennial National garden festivals to be held in Liverpool in 1984 (Jones arranged for the council to delegate the bid to the Merseyside Development Corporation, of which he was a director). More than 3 million people eventually attended.

Heseltine arranged for Liverpool to receive unused government grants for other cities (from the Urban Programme), although the money was less than had been clawed back from Liverpool through council spending cuts. He also played an important role in the redevelopment of Albert Dock, the development of Wavertree Technology Park (the land purchased by £10 million of public money) and the development of Cantril Farm estate into Stockbridge Village, arranging for Barratt Developments to build many new houses for owner occupiers.

Heseltine also played an important role in the development of Urban Development Corporations, directly appointed by the minister and overriding local authority planning controls to spend government money on infrastructure. This was a controversial measure in Labour strongholds such as East London, Merseyside and North East England. He obtained a Treasury grant of £77 million to build the Docklands Light Railway, although transport links to Docklands remained inadequate. He opened Britain's first Enterprise Zone at Corby in Northamptonshire.

Some criticism was made of his time in Liverpool that he spent a lot of money but generated little in the way of new employment ("I would not blame him for that: Liverpool had defeated better men than Michael Heseltine" commented Lady Thatcher acidly in her memoirs in 1993). Local Labour politicians tended to feel that he had accomplished little, although they acknowledged his good intentions. However a more positive assessment was offered by Michael Parkinson, Professor of Urban Affairs at John Moores University: although he had been sceptical in the 1980s, by 1997 he had come to favour the policies championed by Heseltine: assignment of ministers to regions, development of housing associations and cooperatives, and the channelling of government money through business-led agencies rather than through local government.

=== Secretary of State for Defence 1983–86 ===
==== Appointment ====
In October 1982 Secretary of State for Defence John Nott announced that he was stepping down from Parliament at the next election. As defence was expected to be a major issue at the election, it made sense to appoint his successor as soon as possible, and Heseltine's name was widely touted. Over the winter of 1982–1983 there were frequent rumours that military top brass were lobbying against his appointment, strongly denied to the press by Willie Whitelaw (Home Secretary and de facto Deputy Prime Minister) and Chief of Defence Staff Edwin Bramall. Heseltine was appointed in January 1983, with the backing of Nott and Party Chairman Cecil Parkinson.

Bramall had hoped for a period of consolidation after the reorganisations of the early 1980s and the Falklands War. Thatcher felt that Heseltine was "restless" at the Environment, and that he would bring efficiency reforms to Defence, whilst she also wanted to keep him away from economic and social issues. She appointed her Principal Private Secretary Clive Whitmore as Permanent Under-Secretary for Defence (head civil servant for the department – the job had coincidentally fallen vacant).

==== Nuclear disarmament and 1983 election ====
One of Heseltine's main jobs was to campaign against the Campaign for Nuclear Disarmament (CND), which had grown in size from 3,000 to 10,000 in three years amid public disquiet about the deployment of Trident and Cruise missiles, and the hawkish rhetoric often employed by Thatcher and US president Ronald Reagan. Nott had had little interest in campaigning and had left the matter to the minister of state, Peter Blaker, Heseltine's contemporary from Oxford. Heseltine put together a small group of seven civil servants called Defence Section 19 (DS19) to brief MPs and other opinion formers, and argue the case for Britain to have nuclear weapons. Some, both in the civil service and out of it, had qualms about using civil servants for what amounted to a political campaigning role. Opinion polls showed the public to be opposed to Trident and Cruise missiles, but also opposed to unilateral ("one-sided" as Heseltine insisted on calling it) disarmament, so Heseltine steered the debate away from the former and towards the latter.

At the advice of John Ledlie Heseltine visited at the US Air Base at RAF Greenham Common, and after long prior discussion Heseltine insisted on wearing a combat jacket (not, as was often wrongly asserted, a Flak jacket; Ledlie does not accept Heseltine's later claim that he was simply handed it by a military figure to protect his coat from the rain). The jacket was a gift to cartoonists and he wore it on several subsequent visits to military bases. In February 1983 he fell over in the melée (he said at the time that he was pushed) when CND protestors surrounded a meeting of Newbury Conservatives, a propaganda gift, and on Good Friday 1983 he was filmed in West Berlin looking over the wall to the communist east, distracting attention from CND's linking of arms round Greenham Common that day.

With a general election looming, Heseltine was keen to associate Labour with CND, and CND with communists and the Soviet Union (ignoring earlier comments by Party Chairman Cecil Parkinson that this was "manifest nonsense" – the media did not pick up on this). He made such a claim in a speech at Exeter in April 1983, and distributed to Tory candidates information about the background of leading members of CND. This had been assembled by Ray Whitney MP, but some of it was suspected of having come from intelligence sources. MI5 agent Cathy Massiter later wrote, in 1985 in The Observer, that from 1981 onwards and especially from 1983 she had been asked to pass on to DS19 (the propaganda unit at the Ministry of Defence) information obtained by wiretaps and by an MI5 mole in CID. MI5 bosses refused to pass on classified material about security matters but agreed to pass on information about the political links of CND members. Even this was in breach of the 1952 Directive from Home Secretary David Maxwell-Fyfe that the security services not provide information for party political purposes. Heseltine allowed his deputy Peter Blaker to debate with CND, but refused to do so himself, believing that he would be at a disadvantage against the attractive Joan Ruddock. Blaker did much of the work while Heseltine got the publicity. DS19 was wound up three months after the 1983 election, at which Heseltine was widely credited with helping the Conservatives achieve a landslide victory.

==== Administering the department ====
Although the Ministry of Defence already had its own "Management Audit" system, Heseltine insisted on introducing his own version of the MINIS system which he had introduced at the Environment. The Ministry of Defence had a budget of £17 million per annum, and employed 246,000 civilians as well as 300,000 in uniform. Whereas the Department of the Environment had 66 directorates, Defence had 156, each headed by a two-star officer or a civil servant of equivalent seniority. The organisation chart took months to design and covered four large sheets of paper. In the event Heseltine was too preoccupied by the political matters to pay much attention to the MINIs reports which had taken so long to produce. Heseltine disliked dealing with paperwork, and insisted on having plenty of time to take decisions, and that all reports sent to him had to be first run past one of his advisers for comments. Staff numbers fell by 20,000 (one in twelve) during Heseltine's time at Defence, and many services were privatised, including the Royal Ordnance Factories whilst the Royal Navy Dockyards at Devonport and Rosyth were put under private management.

The three separate service ministries (Admiralty, War and Air) had merged into a single Ministry of Defence in 1981. Heseltine drew up plans on a flight back from Kuwait to merge the services further, so that the three chiefs of staff reported directly to the Chief of Defence Staff instead of being treated as colleagues, whilst some supply services were to be merged. The plans were bounced onto the Chief of Defence Staff, Field Marshal "Dwin" Bramall, over a weekend before publication on Monday, so senior officers had minimal time to drum up opposition in Parliament and the press. There was around three months of protest in the press, including from Bramall's predecessor Admiral of the Fleet Sir Henry Leach. Bramall obtained the concession that the individual service chiefs would be allowed to retain small staffs of their own and have a right of appeal to the prime minister. The changes took effect at the start of 1985.

Bramall admired Heseltine's "great drive" and his "style, energy and vision about Europe", but was displeased at Heseltine's rudeness. It was not uncommon for Heseltine to summon him to a meeting early in the day, then keep Bramall "on hold" all day as he kept putting back the meeting, and eventually earning himself a rebuke for failing to display the respect with which every officer in the armed forces is trained to treat his subordinates. A number of senior officers spoke of Heseltine in scathing terms, for example for his self-centredness, to Michael Crick when he was researching his biography. Crick observes that with the exception of some defence chiefs, many people who worked with Heseltine came to "admire and respect him", although those who see him from afar are more suspect.

==== The sinking of the Belgrano ====
Heseltine took a hard line on civil liberties issues. He supported Thatcher's attempt to ban trade unions from GCHQ. He supported the prosecution of Sarah Tisdall for leaking his public relations plans for the arrival of cruise missiles in 1983.

Before Heseltine's arrival at the Ministry of Defence, Tam Dalyell had exposed inconsistencies in ministerial accounts of the sinking of the Argentinian warship ARA General Belgrano during the Falklands War of 1982, and alleged that the ship had been sunk to sabotage Foreign Office attempts to negotiate peace via Washington and Peru. Heseltine, apparently worried that there might be a scandal comparable to Watergate, asked Clive Ponting, a civil servant who had played an important role in Derek Rayner's efficiency reforms, to draw up a detailed report into the sinking of the Belgrano. At the end of March 1984 Ponting attended a series of meetings with Heseltine. He and the Permanent Under-Secretary Clive Whitmore wanted to disclose further information to reveal that the Belgrano had been spotted a day earlier than had previously been admitted. John Stanley, thought to be Thatcher's eyes and ears in the Ministry of Defence, initially opposed it, but Thatcher was persuaded that a letter should be sent to the Opposition Defence Spokesman Denzil Davies. However, both Heseltine and Thatcher rejected Ponting's draft which would have admitted for the first time that the Belgrano had been sighted a day earlier and stated that she was sailing away from the British taskforce when sunk. (Note: It was finally revealed in 2011 that the Belgrano had in fact been sailing back towards the taskforce when sunk, but this intelligence was kept secret at the time – see the article on the Belgrano for details.) Ponting later stated that Stanley had asked Thatcher to overrule Heseltine on the matter; he withheld information not just from Dalyell but from the Commons Foreign Affairs Committee, which was conducting its own inquiry, citing national security considerations.

Six days after Heseltine's letter to Denzil Davies, Ponting sent Davies an anonymous note stating that the letter had been written according to the advice of John Stanley, but contrary to the advice of civil servants, and suggesting other potential lines of inquiry. Three months later he sent two documents exposing the alleged cover up. Heseltine strongly supported, and by some accounts pushed for, the prosecution of Ponting (Ministry of Defence police had advised against, but the Solicitor-General Sir Patrick Mayhew urged that he should be). Heseltine later said that Thatcher had not been involved in the decision to prosecute. Neither Heseltine nor Stanley were called as witnesses at Ponting's trial in January 1985 (Richard Mottram, Heseltine's private secretary, gave evidence on behalf of the Ministry of Defence). To general surprise Ponting was acquitted. A week later Heseltine launched a stinging seventy-minute attack on Ponting in the House of Commons, and a year later he walked out of a Channel 4 News studio on being told that a recorded interview with Ponting was also to be shown. Stanley was seen as the villain of the piece, whereas Heseltine had merely declined to correct false statements made by others.

==== NATO ====
The foreign secretary, Geoffrey Howe, spoke highly of Heseltine's contribution to NATO and WEU conferences. Heseltine was as angry as Thatcher at the US invasion of Grenada, a Commonwealth country. He wanted warmer relations with the Soviets and was sceptical about the US Strategic Defense Initiative ("Star Wars"), putting in a brief and grudging appearance at Caspar Weinberger's Ditchley Park Conference about the topic in 1985.

Heseltine came close to misleading the House of Commons over the meeting of NATO defence ministers at Montebello, Quebec, in October 1983. He stated that no "specific" proposals had been made to update NATO short range and tactical nuclear weapons. In fact a decision had been made in principle to do so. Crick describes Heseltine's answers as "highly disingenuous and deceitful". At the time NATO was claiming to be cutting back on such weapons, and the peace movement was still powerful in Germany where such weapons might be used.

==== Defence procurement ====
The Defence budget was protected by a NATO commitment to increase defence spending by 3% per annum until 1986, but was still subjected to cuts in the proposed budget during Heseltine's tenure. Some senior military figures felt that Heseltine was obsessed with the minutiae of running the department rather than thinking strategically about defence priorities and procurement. Dwin Bramall recalled that Heseltine never showed an interest in the strategy papers he sent him. Thatcher was highly critical of him for failing to take a decision on the development of the Nimrod early-warning plane, on which £660 million was spent over a ten-year period, only for the project to be cancelled by his successor. Some accusations were raised (the Commons Select Committee on Defence thought him "vague and evasive" on the issue in 1985) that the accounts were being massaged to push costs into the period after 1986, when cuts would become inevitable. The journalist Hugo Young later recalled Heseltine briefing journalists confidentially that spending and funding could be reconciled until 1986, by which time he expected "to be gone".

In Cabinet, Heseltine resented being kept out of economic debates and suspected he might be reshuffled to the job of Secretary of State for Northern Ireland as Jim Prior had been. He had tried to pursue a one-man industrial policy, as defence spent £17 billion per annum, 5% of UK GDP, half of it on procurement, and 90% of that in the UK, with 700,000 British jobs dependent on it. Heseltine was unhappy at the way defence contracts were often awarded on a cost-plus basis (i.e. agreeing to pay the supplier a certain amount over and above his costs, leaving no incentive to keep costs to a minimum). In 1985 he promoted his special adviser Peter Levene to be Chief of Defence Procurement; special arrangements had to be made to ensure that Levene did not make decisions affecting his own defence company United Scientific Holdings, of which the former Permanent Secretary Sir Frank Cooper was now chairman, and he was paid £95,000 per annum plus £12,000 in pension contributions, more than the prime minister or senior civil servants. Thatcher agreed to Levene's appointment over civil service objections. He abolished cost-plus pricing of contracts and stated that he had trimmed 10% off the defence equipment budget by 1989 through greater competitive tendering; enough, as Heseltine put it, to pay for the Trident nuclear missile programme.

It had been agreed to spend £280m for two Type 22 frigates. Norman Tebbit (Trade and Industry Secretary), with the backing of the Cabinet, wanted them built at Swan Hunter in the North East, but Heseltine threatened resignation in January 1985 unless at least one was built at Cammell Laird on Merseyside, at a cost of an extra £7 million, where Type 22s had been built before. Thatcher let him have his way after he persuaded her that it would reward shipyard workers who had crossed picket lines during a recent strike, but was privately furious, and keen to keep defence costs down in future by buying American equipment.

Heseltine also favoured European cooperation in defence procurement, feeling that this allowed Europe to compete with US firms which receive huge orders from The Pentagon. Crick argues that his experience of Concorde in the early 1970s should have warned him that such multinational ventures are problematic and, because of the political capital invested, hard to cancel when things go wrong. Heseltine played an important role in persuading West German defence minister Manfred Wörner to back the joint Anglo-German-Spanish-Italian Eurofighter, and contrary to the wishes of Thatcher (and previous defence secretary John Nott) who preferred an American or British fighter. Cabinet refused to allow a loosening of the specifications to allow French company Dassault to become involved in the consortium. Agreement was reached at Turin in August 1985.

Heseltine also sold 132 Tornados for £4bn to Saudi Arabia later in 1985, accepting oil instead of cash (to the displeasure of Peter Walker, Energy Secretary) so that they would buy British rather than US aircraft. This later formed part of the controversial Al-Yamamah arms deal, the main part of which was signed in 1988.

=== Westland Affair ===
==== Background ====
In spring 1985 Heseltine displayed little interest in Westland helicopters when approached by Tebbit (then Secretary of State for Trade and Industry) at the time of Alan Bristow's bid for the company, as plenty of American helicopters were available to meet Britain's defence requirements. He attended two meetings about the company's future in June 1985, chaired by Thatcher. Heseltine, who had a poor opinion of Westland's management, was willing to inject £30 million, provided the Treasury contributed half. The idea was not approved.

Heseltine took against the new chairman Sir John Cuckney's plan that Westland merge with United Technologies Corporation, of which the US company Sikorsky was a subsidiary, after realising that Westland would probably become responsible for assembling the Sikorsky UH-60 Black Hawk helicopter, which the Ministry of Defence would then be under great pressure to buy, whereas he preferred Westland to go into receivership so that GEC and British Aerospace could buy the viable parts of the business.

In mid-October Heseltine suggested a European consortium (which would include French Aérospatiale, German MBB and Italian Agusta). The new Trade and Industry Secretary Leon Brittan at first urged Thatcher to consider a European option (Heseltine later said Brittan preferred this option, although Brittan denied this). The Government was officially neutral (i.e. arguing that it was a matter for Westland directors and shareholders) but by November Heseltine was pushing the European option hard. In late November Peter Levene, Chief of Procurement, had a meeting at the Ministry of Defence with his French, German and Italian counterparts (the National Armaments Directors) and the representatives of the consortium, and agreed to "buy European" for certain classes of helicopters, although Heseltine was not actually present. The meeting was later praised by the House of Commons Defence Select Committee. Thatcher, who only learned of the meeting through Cuckney, was displeased, as were Brittan and the Treasury, who thought the US option might be cheaper.

==== The cancelled meeting ====
In early December Thatcher had two ad hoc meetings with Heseltine, Brittan, Tebbit, William Whitelaw (Deputy Prime Minister), Geoffrey Howe (Foreign Secretary) and Nigel Lawson (Chancellor of the Exchequer). Howe and Tebbit were not unsympathetic to Heseltine's proposed consortium, and the decision was deferred to the Cabinet Economic Affairs Committee (E(A)) on Monday 9 December 1985. After that meeting Thatcher, who complained that three hours had been spent discussing a company with a market capitalisation of only £30m (a tiny amount in government terms), allowed Heseltine until 4pm on Friday 13 December to submit a viable proposal for a European deal. He did (with British Aerospace and GEC now part of his consortium), but Westland's directors rejected it. Heseltine had expected that there would be a second meeting of E(A) to discuss his consortium, but no such meeting was called; Thatcher later stated that the Monday meeting had agreed to leave the decision to Westland to take, but it later emerged that Ridley and Lord Young had placed such a meeting in their diaries and had been told by Number Ten that it had been cancelled. Heseltine threatened resignation for the first time.

Heseltine raised his concerns with Tebbit, Whitelaw and John Wakeham (Chief Whip). At Cabinet on Thursday 12 December he had an angry exchange with Thatcher about the cancelled meeting, but Westland was not on the agenda for the meeting and Thatcher refused to permit a discussion on the matter, arguing that Cabinet could not do so without the necessary papers. Heseltine asked for his dissent to be minuted, and this was not done, although Cabinet Secretary Robert Armstrong stated that this had been an error and added it himself. On Monday 16 December Heseltine sat on the front bench with obvious disapproval when Brittan told the House that it was up to Westland to decide; on Wednesday 18 December he won the backing of the Commons Defence Committee for the European Consortium. On Thursday 19 December the matter was discussed at Cabinet for ten minutes: Cabinet approved leaving the decision to Westland and Heseltine was ordered to cease campaigning for the European option. Heseltine had failed to drum up enough support among possible allies like Tebbit, Howe, Walker, Norman Fowler and Tom King. A ministerial colleague at the time described him as "absolutely looney, completely hyped up with the thing" and of having a "persecution mania".

==== Mayhew's leaked letter ====
By now the political row was being discussed in the media, partly because of the lack of other news in December. Cuckney wrote to Thatcher, at her behest, asking for reassurance that the Sikorsky deal would not damage Westland's business prospects in Europe. Heseltine was not satisfied with Thatcher's draft reply when he saw it and consulted Sir Patrick Mayhew (Solicitor-General and acting attorney-general as Sir Michael Havers was ill) on the grounds that the government might be legally liable for any incorrect advice. Heseltine supplied extra material about the risk of losing European business, which Thatcher did not include in her reply to Cuckney. Heseltine then wrote to David Horne of Lloyds Merchant Bank, who was advising the European consortium (in reply to planted questions from Horne which had been dictated to him over the phone by one of Heseltine's staff), giving him the advice which Thatcher had declined to include in her letter to Cuckney (that the Sikorsky deal would be "incompatible with participation" in European helicopter projects). Heseltine's letter was also leaked to the press. This was a blatant challenge to Thatcher's authority as Heseltine had not consulted Downing Street, the Department of Trade and Industry or Mayhew before writing to Horne.

Thatcher discussed sacking Heseltine with close colleagues over Christmas; but, as she later admitted in her memoir, refrained from doing so as he was too popular and important as a political figure. She also decided against sending him a letter threatening him with the sack, which had been drafted. Instead she asked Mayhew to write to Heseltine complaining of what he thought were "material inaccuracies" in his letter to Horne, and asking Heseltine to write to Horne again, correcting them. Mayhew's letter of rebuke to Heseltine – marked "Confidential" – reached Heseltine at lunchtime on Monday 6 January and was immediately leaked to the press by Colette Bowe, an information officer at the Department of Trade and Industry, at Brittan's request (some years later he admitted that he acted on the "express" instructions of Charles Powell and Bernard Ingham, Thatcher's two senior advisers). Heseltine was able to produce extra documents which Mayhew accepted as backing up his letter to Horne, but not before The Sun had called Heseltine "You Liar!" on its front page (the newspaper was later required to make a donation to charity in lieu of libel damages).

==== Resignation ====
Cabinet met on the morning of Thursday 9 January, with Thatcher already having agreed her position with close colleagues at Chequers that weekend, and arranged that Scottish Secretary George Younger should take over as Defence Secretary if Heseltine resigned. Westland was first on the agenda, and Heseltine and Brittan were permitted to put their cases. Heseltine had won the moral high ground over the leaking saga, but Lawson recorded that he seemed obsessive at Cabinet and attracted little sympathy. Thatcher then reiterated her position, which had already been endorsed by the Cabinet, that Westland's future was a matter for Westland to decide, and announced that on grounds of Collective responsibility all answers to questions about Westland must in be cleared through the Cabinet Office. In response to a question by Nicholas Ridley (a friend of Heseltine) she confirmed that this also applied to statements which had already been made.

Following further questions from Heseltine, and another summing up by Thatcher, Heseltine protested that there had been no collective responsibility, gathered up his papers and left the Cabinet Room. Eyewitness accounts differ as to his exact words, or even whether he explicitly resigned. By one account he declared, "I can no longer be a member of this Cabinet." Having allegedly paid a quick visit to the lavatory to straighten his hair and his Guards tie, Heseltine announced his resignation to the waiting press outside Number Ten, the first Cabinet minister to resign from a Cabinet meeting since Joseph Chamberlain in 1886. Some ministers (for example Peter Walker) and civil servants believed Heseltine could have been persuaded to return had it not been for the public announcement.

At 4pm that day Heseltine delivered a 3,000 word, 22 minute resignation statement at the Ministry of Defence (rather than waiting to make a statement to the House of Commons when it resumed four days later). He may well have prepared this earlier, although his private secretary Richard Mottram says not. To Thatcher's fury Defence officials had helped him throughout the crisis and in preparing this document. His statement denounced Thatcher's managerial style and suggested she was a liar who lacked integrity. Thatcher later said during a television interview that she had not sacked him or called him to order before the incident because, “Had I done that, I know exactly what the press would have said: there you are, old bossyboots at it again.”

==== Fallout from the affair ====
Unlike when Peter Thorneycroft (Chancellor of the Exchequer) resigned in 1958 or Lord Carrington (Foreign Secretary) in 1982, Heseltine's junior ministers Norman Lamont and John Lee did not resign with him. Heseltine was portrayed by Spitting Image as a swivel-eyed lunatic holding a toy helicopter.

Brittan had to resign, partly as a result of fallout from the leak of the Mayhew letter, and partly because of his failure to give an entirely truthful answer to the House of Commons about Heseltine's accusation that he had pressured British Aerospace to withdraw from the European Consortium. Thatcher survived the Westland debate on 27 January, aided by a poor and long-winded speech by Opposition Leader Neil Kinnock. Sikorsky bought Westland.

Up until Westland, Thatcher had approved of most of what Heseltine had done, even though their politics were rather different. Heseltine and Thatcher had quarrelled openly over a question of relations between Britain and the European Community (as it then was). Apart from the clash of personalities, and the escalation of small issues into bigger issues, it has been suggested that Heseltine, concerned at impending Defence cuts in 1986, and worried that Thatcher was unlikely to promote him further, was looking for an excuse for a resignation, which would put him in good stead to be elected party leader after, as seemed likely at the time, the Conservatives would lose the next election due by summer 1988.

== Out of office: 1986–90 ==
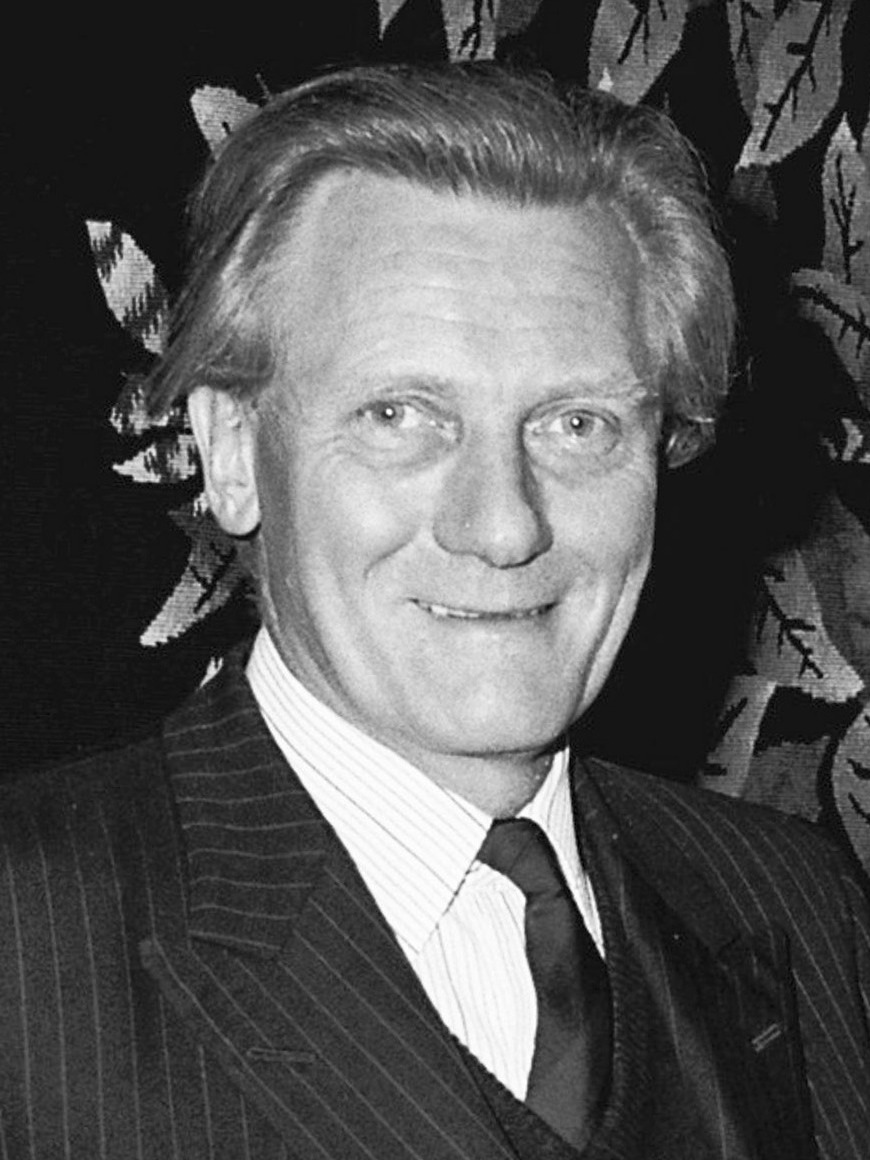
Heseltine in 1988

=== Campaigning ===
Heseltine was not one to befriend and gossip with colleagues or backbenchers. He did not regard this as an insurmountable problem, as neither Heath nor Thatcher had been particularly "clubbable" either. From about the mid-1970s, he began a campaign of addressing local associations, sometimes using a helicopter to speak to several in one day. Heseltine had often had a reputation for being very cold and aloof with backbench MPs and party activists (Steven Norris said that after a visit to his constituency in 1983, local activists used a poster of Heseltine as a dartboard). However, in 1986–1990 he was a frequent visitor to local constituency dinners, although he usually attacked Labour rather than the Conservative government, and he used his wealth to afford a chauffeur and a helicopter.

Heseltine campaigned in 100 constituencies in the 1987 election, attracting more publicity than many Cabinet ministers, although seldom mentioning Thatcher by name.

During this period Heseltine enjoyed excellent relations with the media: among TV journalists he was in regular touch with Elinor Goodman of Channel 4 News (herself a former Haymarket employee), James Mates of ITN (son of his lieutenant Michael Mates) and John Cole, whilst among print journalists he was close to his old friend Anthony Howard (Deputy Editor of the Observer), Peter Jenkins, and especially close to Anthony Bevins of The Independent and the young Alastair Campbell of the Daily Mirror.

=== Books ===
Heseltine's book Where There's A Will was written by a team of ghostwriters directed by Keith Hampson and Julian Haviland (former political editor of ITN and The Times). Academics, businessmen and economists contributed, and he often had them thresh out ideas in front of him. "He acquires by social intercourse the knowledge that other people acquire by reading", one adviser commented. The collated drafts were then rewritten by Haviland to "give it one voice". Hugo Young called it "the most impressive [book of its kind] I've read by a modern Conservative".

Heseltine's second book, The Challenge of Europe: Can Britain Win?, appeared in 1989. Heseltine was in close touch with President of the European Commission Jacques Delors, who paid a 3-hour visit to his Victoria office, diplomats Nicholas Henderson and Antony Acland and economist Christopher Johnson, who is thought to have persuaded him of the merits of European monetary union. The book won a £10,000 Adolphe Bentincke prize for advancing European unity. Heseltine was a qualified supporter of the social charter (a stronger precursor to the Social Chapter from which John Major would later opt out in the Maastricht Treaty). He was seen as devoted to Europe as a matter of what he perceived as Britain's self-interest, not on an emotional level like Edward Heath, Roy Jenkins or Kenneth Clarke.

=== Policies ===
Out of office Heseltine called for money, including the receipts from council house sales, to be spent on infrastructure investment instead of tax cuts. He also called for reductions in tax relief on mortgage interest payments and pension contributions, in the hope of encouraging investment into industry rather than into property and finance, echoing views being promoted by Will Hutton at the time.

Heseltine also took an interest in the reduction of long-term unemployment, advocating Swedish-style Workfare. A pamphlet by Richard Layard on the topic would have been published under Heseltine's name had it not been for his return to government at the end of 1990. Several of Heseltine's advisers at this time were SDP supporters, and in some cases later defected to Labour; Crick commented (in 1997) that Heseltine's views at this time were very similar to those later advocated by Tony Blair's New Labour.

=== Differences with the government ===
Heseltine's resignation in January 1986 had been just before the only occasion on which the Poll Tax was discussed in Cabinet. He spoke against the tax when it was enacted into law in 1987–1988, but abstained rather than voting against as Edward Heath did, although he voted for Michael Mates' amendment which tried to introduce an element of banding according to ability to pay. Heseltine remained aloof from factional plotting in the Commons, and voted with the left-wing Lollard faction in backbench committee elections. Heseltine later said that he regretted resigning from the Cabinet in 1986, as he subsequently often wondered if he and Nigel Lawson might have been able to persuade Thatcher to abandon the tax.

Heseltine clashed bitterly at this time with his former friend Nicholas Ridley. Ridley was a Eurosceptic, a free marketer, a champion of the poll tax and a key ally of Thatcher. Heseltine argued that there was too much green belt building (although in fact only slightly more so than he had himself authorised as Environment Secretary) and stated that as a property developer he had never built on a "green" site, forgetting that he had done so in Tenterden in the early 1960s.

=== Leadership rival ===
Although (or perhaps because) many of Heseltine's policy positions were not far removed from those of Labour, which was shifting to the right under Kinnock, he kept up his Conservative credentials at this time. In alliance with Norman Tebbit he persuaded ministers to abolish the Inner London Education Authority. He also supported the government's planned market-led reforms to the NHS and water privatisation in 1989. He also spoke out frequently on defence matters, supported the government's ban on Spycatcher, the new Official Secrets Act 1989 and called for an independent Bank of England, although perhaps as a stepping stone to the setting up of a European Central Bank.

One of the reasons which Thatcher gave to close confidants for not retiring on her tenth anniversary as Prime Minister (May 1989) was worry that Heseltine would defeat Geoffrey Howe in any subsequent leadership election. Opinion polls showed that Heseltine would boost Conservative support by 13 percentage points – enough to overtake Labour. Sir Anthony Meyer wanted to see Heseltine as leader and only went ahead with his December 1989 leadership challenge to Thatcher on being assured by Keith Hampson that it would not damage Heseltine's chances; in the event Heseltine apparently walked up and down the corridor outside the voting booth making clear that he was abstaining. While Thatcher won the contest, winning the votes of 85% of Conservative MPs, the next day's Glasgow Herald reported that Heseltine's supporters predicted that unless she changed "her style of leadership", she would "be on her way out next year".

In spring 1990 Thatcher's political fortunes were looking weaker, as the Conservatives were badly defeated at the Mid Staffordshire by-election and the Poll tax riots took place. But despite Conservative losses at the local elections, Party Chairman Kenneth Baker spun the result as a success by pointing to the Conservative hold of Westminster and Wandsworth Councils, where the poll tax was low. In May 1990, following the elections, Heseltine wrote an article in The Times proposing reform of the poll tax – he called for the tax to be banded according to income, for councils which spent more than a certain level to face mandatory elections, for elected local mayors and for the restoration of the unitary county boroughs (i.e. making smaller cities into counties in their own right, so ending the confusion as to whether county or district council were responsible for high spending) which he himself had abolished. However, the Iraqi invasion of Kuwait in August 1990, which made war seem likely, boosted Thatcher's popularity.

=== 1990 leadership contest ===
Heseltine was being quietly urged to challenge Thatcher for the party leadership by David Mellor, the Arts Minister, but in a carefully worded formula Heseltine had repeatedly insisted that he could "not foresee ... circumstances" in which he would do so. Then came the Conservative defeat at the Eastbourne by-election (18 October) and the resignation of Deputy Prime Minister Geoffrey Howe (1 November).

Heseltine wrote a six-page public letter to his local Association chairman, calling for more regard for the wide range of opinions in the party. Heseltine then left for the Middle East to visit King Hussein of Jordan and Israeli Prime Minister Yitzhak Shamir. Association officers sent him a 97-word reply (5 November) saying that they supported Thatcher's leadership. The party's regional agent had been present at their meeting, but they insisted he had not interfered with their reply. Round about the same time Thatcher's press secretary Bernard Ingham briefed journalists that Heseltine had "lit the blue touch paper then retired", although he denied having demanded that Heseltine "put up or shut up"; the Daily Mail front page asked "does he have the courage?" and The Times commented that if he did not throw his hat into the ring he would deserve to have it "stuffed down his throat". Thatcher brought the annual leadership election forward by a fortnight, causing Alastair Campbell to write in the Daily Mirror that "Tarzan the Tory Ape Man had made a right monkey of himself". A week later, after meeting Heseltine, the constituency officers issued another letter saying that they regretted how their reply had been construed as criticism.

Then came Howe's resignation speech in the Commons on 13 November, in which he launched a strong attack on Thatcher; next morning Heseltine announced his candidacy for the leadership, saying that over 100 MPs had asked him to stand and that he was better placed than Thatcher to lead the Tories to a fourth election victory.

During the subsequent leadership election on 20 November, he polled 152 votes (40.9%) in the first round of voting by Conservative MPs, enough to prevent an outright Thatcher victory. (The rules required an incumbent leader to obtain a majority of at least 15% on a first ballot; Thatcher polled 204 votes, equal to 54.8%). Heseltine was thought by many pundits to be on course to beat her in the second ballot as many Conservative MPs were now rumoured to be ready to switch support from Thatcher and only 27 would have had to have done so to give Heseltine the overall majority he would need in the second ballot.

With lukewarm support from her Cabinet, most of whom had told her that she could not win and faced with the bitter prospect of a Heseltine premiership, Thatcher withdrew from the contest and announced her resignation on the morning of 22 November, although she continued to serve as prime minister until a new party leader had been chosen.

Heseltine was disappointed not to receive the support of old allies on the second ballot; these included Secretary of State for Defence Tom King (whom he asked in vain to second his nomination, but who was angry at a leadership contest when British troops were soon to go to war in Kuwait and supported Douglas Hurd), Cecil Parkinson and Norman Lamont (who managed John Major's campaign). Over the weekend on 24–25 November, many Conservative MPs were faced with the anger of their local party members who overwhelmingly supported Thatcher but did not at that time have a vote in leadership elections, and opinion polls showed that chancellor John Major would also boost Conservative support if leader (previously Heseltine's unique selling-point). Heseltine had never done much to court support among younger MPs the way Major had, and was seen as aloof even by his own supporters. In the second ballot, a week after the first, Heseltine's vote actually fell to 131 (just over 35%) as some MPs had voted for him in the first ballot as a protest against or to try to oust Thatcher but preferred to vote for other candidates now that they had a wider choice. John Major, with 185 votes, was only two votes short of an overall majority. Heseltine immediately and publicly conceded defeat, announcing that he would vote for Major if the third ballot went ahead (it did not, as Hurd, who had finished a distant third, also conceded).

Although for the rest of his career Heseltine's role in Thatcher's downfall earned him enmity from Thatcher's supporters in the Conservative party, this opprobrium was not universal. In a reference to the reluctance of the Cabinet to support Thatcher on the second ballot, Edward Leigh said of Heseltine: "At least he stabbed her in the front".

Heseltine believed that he would have defeated Thatcher if she had contested the second ballot. It has been suggested that he should have withdrawn after weakening her on the first ballot, and that he would have been restored to the Cabinet whether or not she continued as prime minister; he writes that this was never seriously suggested at the time.

== Career under Major: 1990–1997 ==
=== Second term as Environment Secretary: 1990–1992 ===
Heseltine disappointed many of his supporters by not pushing for them to get jobs in Major's new administration. Ian Grist was sacked from the Welsh Office and Michael Mates was eventually given a minister of state position following the 1992 election. There were suggestions that Heseltine might be appointed Home Secretary, but Heseltine advertised his lack of interest in the position, and Major insisted that he had not offered it to him. By contrast, his enthusiasm for industrial policy made it impossible for him to be appointed secretary of state for trade and industry, the job he most coveted.

After a handshake of reconciliation on the steps of 10 Downing Street, Major appointed Heseltine to the Environment, the same job he had held a decade earlier. Civil servants found him a secure and mature character in the second interaction, and keener to conciliate local councils, but at the same time a grander and more detached individual, aware that he had already earned a place in history and had the energy of a political heavyweight.

In a May 1990 article Heseltine had proposed that the Poll Tax be reformed rather than abolished. He now had a remit to reform it, and invited the opposition parties to take part in his review of options (Labour did not; the Liberal Democrats did, and proposed a local income tax). Heseltine insisted that Michael Portillo, who had been a major cheerleader for the tax, be retained as Minister of State for Local Government. Portillo and Robert Key handled the detail and presented Heseltine with a list of options. Various options were leaked to the press to test public reaction, and at one point Heseltine appeared to have settled on a tax graded both according to the size of the property and the number of adults living in it. Major was exasperated by the lack of progress and intervened, and – at Major's insistence – Chancellor Norman Lamont increased VAT by 2.5 percentage points to 17.5% in his April 1991 budget so as to provide a £4.5bn subsidy to bring poll tax bills down. Eventually, as expected, the poll tax was abolished and the new Council Tax was graded according to the size of a property, with the only concession to headcount being a single-person discount. In Crick's view, the outcome was much more Sarah Hogg's and Portillo's and Major's doing than Heseltine's.

Heseltine was permitted by his colleagues to explore the option of elected city mayors, although it did not meet with Cabinet approval; other ministers were concerned at the likelihood that cities would elect Labour mayors or that there might be deadlock between mayors and local councils. Heseltine also explored the option of unitary authorities (i.e. merging district and county councils), setting up what came to be known as the Banham Commission. Crick regards the commission as a mistake for which Heseltine has received too little blame. The proposals rumbled on for several years, causing annoyance to many Conservative councillors and to their backers in Parliament. The commission was reconstituted and scaled down by the then environment secretary John Gummer in 1995.

In the summer of 1991 Heseltine also launched a City Challenge process, whereby cities competed for government grants for capital projects, and played a key role in Major's decision to back Manchester's (unsuccessful as it turned out) bid to host the 1996 Olympic Games. He also proposed plans for developing an East Thames corridor (christened "Hezzaville" or "Heseltown" by the media).

Heseltine received a standing ovation at the October 1991 Party Conference, seen as a sign of his rehabilitation with party activists, and was included on the A-Team to prepare for the 1992 election. He mocked Shadow Chancellor John Smith's "prawn cocktail offensive" to try to butter up City opinion ("Never have so many crustaceans died in vain"). He was a leading performer in the election and it was felt that had the Conservatives lost he might well have won the party leadership and been Leader of the Opposition, while if they won he would probably be given Trade and Industry, the job he had always wanted.

=== President of the Board of Trade: 1992–1995 ===
==== Industrial policy ====
Following the 1992 general election he was appointed Secretary of State for Trade and Industry, choosing to be known by the title, dormant since 1974, of "President of the Board of Trade". He insisted on being addressed as "President" (not "Mr President") and being referred to as "the President". The board had not met since 1850, but it did not need to as it had a quorum of one.

On the backbenches Heseltine had praised the Japanese MITI, and had been planning a book on the subject. He promised to intervene "before breakfast, dinner and tea" to help British companies, but had little opportunity for intervention as the DTI budget had dropped from over £3bn in the early 1980s to £1bn in 1992–1993, a fifth the budget of the Welsh Office. NEDO, which had been set up to coordinate industrial policy in the early 1960s, was abolished by Chancellor Norman Lamont in June 1992, although Heseltine was able to absorb some of the staff into the DTI to set up working parties to shadow specific industries. His junior ministers were Neil Hamilton and Edward Leigh, both Thatcherites. Gordon Brown mocked him (6 July 1992) as having "absolute power over a department which has become absolutely powerless" and "the tiger that was once the king of the jungle is now just the fireside rug – decorative and ostentatious, but essentially there to be walked all over".

Heseltine was seen as more interested in large than in small and medium-sized companies, and in 1992 was only with difficulty persuaded to refer Lloyds Bank's takeover bid for Midland Bank to the Office of Fair Trading.

==== Pit closures ====
Heseltine's responsibilities also included Energy, as the separate Energy ministry was abolished.

Electricity companies now decided on their own contracts, rather than being obliged by the government to choose British coal. With plans being made for the privatisation of British Coal, on 13 October 1992 Heseltine and British Coal both separately announced that 31 of British Coal's 50 pits were to close, with the loss of 30,000 jobs. Most of the detailed work had been done by the minister of state Tim Eggar. Many of the mines in Nottinghamshire that had continued working during the 1984–1985 strike were to close. Although this policy was seen by the Nottinghamshire miners as a betrayal, there was hardly any organised resistance to the programme. The government stated that since the pits were losing money they could be sustained only through unjustifiable government subsidies. Mine supporters pointed to the mines' high productivity rates and to the fact that their monetary losses were due to the large subsidies that other European nations were giving to their coal industries.

An early leak had seen little reaction but Heseltine was taken aback by the public anger. Over 100 pits had closed since the 1984–1985 strike. The closures were to be rushed because the Treasury, under pressure from Major, had agreed to make money for generous redundancy settlements available only in the 1992–1993 fiscal year. It looked terrible coming at the fag end of the recession, when the government had a tiny majority, and just after the fiasco of Black Wednesday and the scandal of David Mellor's resignation. Heseltine was attacked by Marcus Fox, Jim Pawsey, Nicholas Winterton, Bill Cash, Rhodes Boyson and his former supporter David Evans who called openly for him to be sacked.

The High Court found that Heseltine and British Coal had acted "unlawfully and irrationally". Faced with likely defeat in the House of Commons, Heseltine was forced to agree to a moratorium, during which time he attempted, largely unsuccessfully, to seek new markets for British coal and to obtain government subsidies for pits.

The band Chumbawamba released the critical song "Mr Heseltine meets the public" that portrayed Heseltine as an out-of-touch figure; the same group had once dedicated a song to the village of Fitzwilliam, West Yorkshire, which was reduced to a ghost village by the closure of the local coal pits.

In February 1993, Heseltine announced that unlike the Dutch and Belgian governments, Britain would not be contributing to any bailout of Anglo-Dutch DAF Trucks (which in the event went bankrupt in June). By early 1993 Heseltine's fortunes were at a low ebb, with his future as a minister being called into question.

A review into the pit closures appeared in March 1993. By this time, public anger had cooled. By the start of 1997, British Coal had been reduced to 28 pits.

==== Heart attack ====
On 21 June 1993, Heseltine suffered a serious heart attack in Venice (especially worrying as Heseltine was sixty, and his father had died of a heart attack aged fifty-five). The pains had already stopped by the time he reached hospital. Heseltine was shown looking unwell and using a wheelchair – in fact the result of gout in his foot from the medication which he was taking. He took four months off from work, and did not make a speech at the party conference in October 1993, instead amusing the audience by appearing on the platform and performing mock exercises with his arms.

There were concerns about his ability to remain in government. In 1994 Chris Morris jokingly implied on BBC Radio 1 that Heseltine had died, and persuaded MP Jerry Hayes to broadcast an on-air tribute. Morris was subsequently suspended.

==== Political resurgence ====
Heseltine, who had been seen as an arriviste in his younger days, was now something of a grandee and elder statesman. In 1994 he re-emerged as a serious political player, beginning with his testimony for the Scott Report during the Arms-to-Iraq Inquiry (whose report eventually appeared in 1996). It was revealed that he had refused to sign the Public Interest Immunity Certificates (attempting to withhold evidence from the trial in 1992, on grounds of national security) as demanded by the attorney-general Sir Nicholas Lyell, who advised him that ministers were obliged to sign such a certificate. In fact after half a dozen meetings over the course of a week, and Heseltine insisting on reading Bingham LJ's judgement in the Makanjuola case, Heseltine had agreed to sign a slightly different version of the PII which made clear his reservations. However, this was not picked up on at the trial, nor were Heseltine's concerns – contrary to assurances given to him by Lyell – that some of the documents might be useful to the defence passed on to the trial judge.

Nonetheless, his evidence in February 1994 was seen as an attack on Lyell and on the ministers (Kenneth Clarke, his potential rival for the leadership, Rifkind and Tristan Garel-Jones) who had signed the certificates without demur. The cover of Private Eye announced "A Legend Lives" and one major newspaper ended an editorial by proclaiming that the "balance of probability" was that Heseltine would be prime minister before the end of the year – this being at a time when John Major's leadership had lost much credibility after the scandals following the "Back to Basics" campaign the previous autumn.

Heseltine also acted to enforce a squeaky clean image at this time, by announcing an inquiry in July 1994, into allegations of insider dealing by Jeffrey Archer (there was insufficient evidence to prosecute), and by personally (rather than in writing) announcing an inquiry into whether a weapons manufacturing company called BMARC had broken government guidelines on trading with Iraq in the late 1980s.

Heseltine launched a White Paper on Competitiveness in 1994. He was active in leading British trade delegations to South Africa, South America, India and Russia, but despite his enthusiasm for European Unity was seen to display little interest in the nuts and bolts of trade negotiations with the continent.

In 1994 Heseltine planned to privatise 40% of the Post Office, a move which the Conservatives had previously shied away from. He was seen as imperious and intolerant by backbench opponents concerned at the threat to local postal services ("he seemed to have lost touch" one commented after a meeting), and the plan was abandoned by the Cabinet as unlikely to pass the House of Commons, as the Major government's majority had dropped to 14 by then. However, Heseltine was gaining some popularity with the Tory Right at this time, helped by his opposition to lowering the gay age of consent from 21 to 18, and his attack on the European Community as overregulated and sclerotic. (The popularity of his rival Kenneth Clarke, by contrast, was suffering among Tory MPs after his unpopular autumn 1994 budget and his overt enthusiasm for the mooted Single European Currency). However, there was to be no leadership election that autumn.

Eurosceptics had been floating the idea of a referendum on membership of the Single Currency or even of membership of the European Community, since at least 1994. In November 1994 Foreign Secretary Douglas Hurd, with Major's approval and supported by Malcolm Rifkind, had advocated a referendum on joining the euro or on the upcoming 1996 Intergovernmental Conference, but Heseltine and Clarke were opposed (only these five senior ministers appear to have been involved) and the proposal was shelved for the time being.

=== 1995 leadership election ===
John Major was consistently opposed by Eurosceptics in his party (known as the Maastricht Rebels – a small minority of MPs before 1997, but enjoying much wider support among party activists). Heseltine always stated categorically that he would never stand for party leader against Major.

In mid-1995 Major challenged his critics to "put up or shut up" by resubmitting himself to a leadership election in which he was unsuccessfully opposed by John Redwood the Secretary of State for Wales. There was speculation that Heseltine's supporters would engineer Major's downfall in the hope that their man would take over, but they stayed loyal to Major. Heseltine had been listening to regular reports about his potential support from his lieutenants Keith Hampson, Richard Ottaway, Michael Mates and Peter Temple-Morris, and in the event of a second ballot hoped to receive Major's endorsement. Peter Tapsell refused to support him because of the European issue. Hampson believed that Heseltine might have won, as did Philip Stephens of the Financial Times. Michael Crick does not agree, pointing out that many of Heseltine's supporters from 1990 had retired from the Commons and the 1992 intake was more right-wing and eurosceptic.

Heseltine, who showed his ballot paper to the returning officers to prove that he had voted for Major, commented that "John Major deserves a great deal better than that from his colleagues". Major was re-elected leader.

=== Deputy Prime Minister: 1995–1997 ===
Heseltine had a two-hour meeting with Major on the morning of the leadership vote. He was promoted to Deputy Prime Minister and First Secretary of State. He was given a swipe card to enter 10 Downing Street whenever he liked and the right to attend any committee he wished. He chaired four Cabinet Committees, including Environment and Local Government, and two new committees: Competitiveness Committee (effectively, industrial strategy) and the Coordination and Presentation of Government Policy (EDCP) which met every weekday at 8.30am.

The matter of a referendum on joining the euro, after much press speculation, was raised again at Cabinet by Douglas Hogg in the spring of 1996, very likely (in Clarke's view) with Major's approval; Clarke records that Heseltine spoke "with passionate intensity" at Cabinet against a referendum, believing both that referendums were pernicious and that no concession would be enough to please the Eurosceptics. Clarke, who had already threatened resignation over the issue, also opposed the measure and, although Clarke and Heseltine were in a small minority, Major once again deferred a decision. Major, Heseltine and Clarke eventually reached agreement in April 1996, in what Clarke describes as "a tense meeting … rather like a treaty session", that there would be a commitment to a referendum before joining the euro, but that the pledge would be valid for one Parliament only (i.e. until the general election after next), with the government's long-term options remaining completely open; Clarke threatened to resign if this formula were departed from. Heseltine had opposed a referendum on euro membership when Thatcher proposed it in 1990. Clarke, writing in 2016 after the Brexit Referendum, comments that he and Heseltine later agreed that they had separately decided to give way because of the pressure Major was under, and that the referendum pledge "was the biggest single mistake" of their careers, giving "legitimacy" to such a device.

Heseltine made several visits to Manchester in the aftermath of the IRA bomb on 15 June 1996 – he won the praise of opposition politicians for cutting red tape to arrange remedial measures. However, Crick recounts complaints about his aloofness from small shopkeepers, and Crick comments that he seemed to have lost the common touch which he had displayed in Liverpool in the early 1980s.

In 1996 Heseltine was also one of the more hawkish ministers in urging non-cooperation with the European Community over the beef ban. However, after press speculation in December 1996 that he might abandon the government's "wait and see" policy on the euro in the hope of winning Eurosceptic votes, he took to the airwaves – in apparent unison with Clarke – to insist that the government retained a free choice as to whether or not to join, angering Eurosceptics.

Heseltine played an important role in taking charge of the Millennium Exhibition in Greenwich and ensuring that it happened, even having a meeting with Tony Blair, Leader of the Opposition, in January 1997 to agree that a Labour Government would back it.

=== After government ===
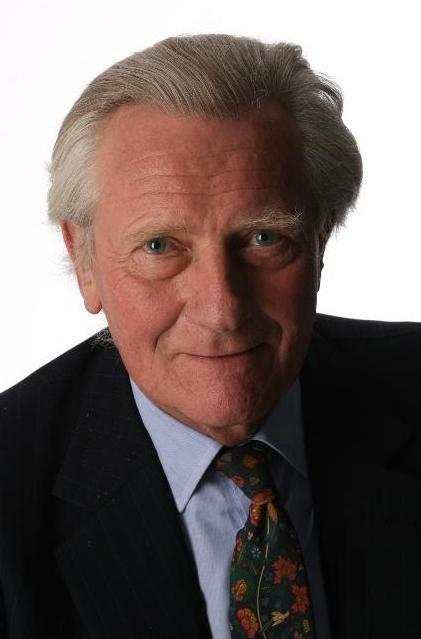
Portrait of Heseltine in 2007

On 3 May, the day after the government was defeated at the 1997 general election, Heseltine suffered an attack of angina and had a tube inserted into an artery; at 64, and twenty years older than the new prime minister, he declined to stand for the Conservative Party leadership again. However, he was less unpopular with eurosceptics than Clarke, and on the third ballot of the subsequent leadership election Clarke, facing imminent defeat by William Hague, offered to stand aside in Heseltine's favour, but he declined on medical advice. He became active in promoting the benefits for Britain of joining the Single European Currency, appearing on the same stage as Tony Blair, Gordon Brown and Robin Cook as part of an all-party campaign to promote Euro membership. He was also made a Member of the Order of the Companions of Honour in the 1997 resignation Honours List. In November 1999 Heseltine was invited by Hague to be the Conservative candidate for the new position of Mayor of London (in place of Jeffrey Archer who had had to stand down because of scandal), but he declined.

In the interim Shadow Cabinet of John Major he served as Deputy Leader of the Opposition, Shadow Chancellor of the Duchy of Lancaster and Shadow Secretary of State for Trade and Industry.

== Retirement ==
Heseltine stood down from his Henley constituency at the 2001 election, being succeeded by Spectator editor and future prime minister Boris Johnson, but he remained outspoken on British politics. He was created a life peer on 12 July 2001 taking the title Baron Heseltine, of Thenford in the County of Northamptonshire.

In December 2002 Heseltine controversially called for Iain Duncan Smith to be replaced as leader of the Conservatives by the "dream-ticket" of Clarke as leader and Michael Portillo as deputy. He suggested the party's MPs vote on the matter rather than party members as currently required by party rules. Without the replacement of Duncan Smith, the party "has not a ghost of a chance of winning the next election" he said. Duncan Smith was removed the following year. In the 2005 party leadership election, Heseltine backed young moderniser David Cameron.

Following Cameron's election to the leadership he set up a wide-ranging policy review. Chairmen of the various policy groups included ex-Chancellor Kenneth Clarke and other former Cabinet ministers John Redwood, John Gummer, Stephen Dorrell and Michael Forsyth as well as ex-leader Iain Duncan Smith. Heseltine was appointed to head the cities task force having been responsible for urban policy twice as Environment Secretary under Thatcher and Major.

In 2008 Heseltine took part in the BBC Wales programme Coming Home about his Welsh family history. He said in this programme that he regarded Wales as his home and identified strongly with his Welsh ancestry.

In March 2012, he was asked to head an audit of the UK's industrial performance for Chancellor of the Exchequer George Osborne and HM Treasury, upon which—after 11 years as a member of the House of Lords—he made his maiden speech in the chamber.

Heseltine was interviewed in 2012 as part of The History of Parliament's oral history project.

In 2023, Heseltine appeared as the guest star in the first episode of The Rest Is Politics: Leading, a podcast hosted by Alastair Campbell and Rory Stewart.

=== No stone unturned ===
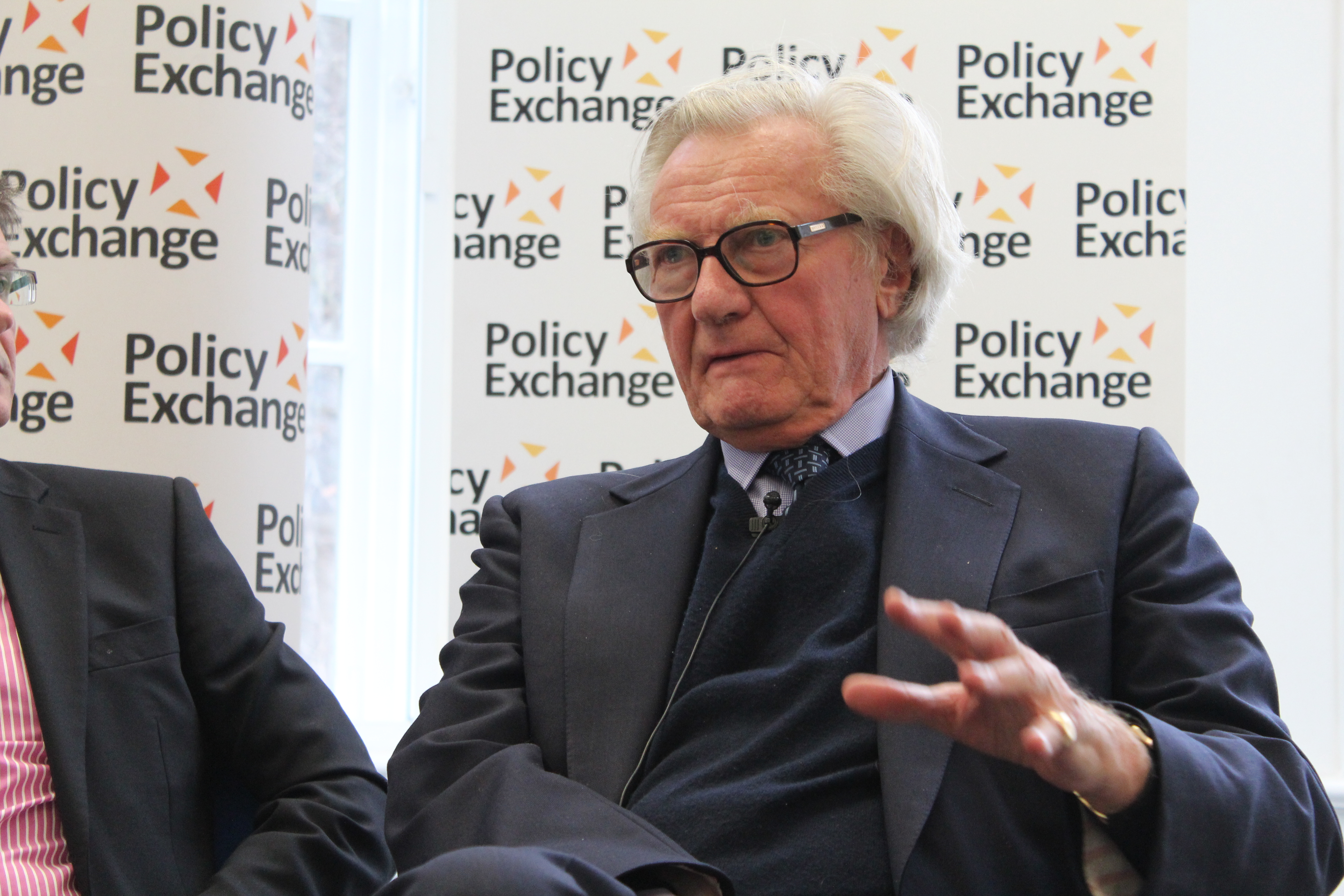
Heseltine speaking to Policy Exchange in 2013

Following the arrival of the Coalition into power in 2010, he was commissioned to draw up "Plan H" or "No Stone Left Unturned" to stimulate growth in local areas. Since then, 81 out of his 89 recommendations have been adopted. At the 2013 Budget, the Coalition pledged to pool billions of pounds of regional spending into a single fund in a bid to de-centralise public spending and boost economic growth outside London.

=== Other Heseltine comments ===
Heseltine criticised the Coalition's policy on Europe, but he did support the tightening of immigration laws. He also supported George Osborne's Budget measures in 2013 and Iain Duncan Smith's welfare reforms, but showed concerns over the legalisation of same-sex marriage. In June 2013, he voted against Lord Dear's wrecking amendment, thus ratifying the same-sex marriage act.

=== Views on Brexit and involvement in the campaign for a People's Vote ===
He described the 2016 Brexit referendum result to leave the European Union as "the greatest constitutional crisis of modern times" and condemned Leave campaigner Boris Johnson as a coward for pulling out of the Conservative leadership election after winning the referendum, likening him to "a general who has led his troops to the sound of guns, and, at first sight of battle, has left the field". Lord Heseltine queried the way Theresa May as home secretary campaigned to remain in the EU though "within a few weeks" of becoming PM, she insisted "Brexit means Brexit". Heseltine mentioned a speech by Theresa May before the EU referendum, where she urged Britain to "stand tall and lead in Europe". Heseltine said: "I don't know how someone who made that speech can, within a few weeks, say Brexit is Brexit and ask the nation to unite behind it...[unlike Margaret Thatcher] this lady was for turning."

In March 2017 he was sacked from a number of advisory roles within government after rebelling over the article 50 legislation in the House of Lords, but said he would continue working to avert the "disaster" of Brexit. He later said that it was "quite unacceptable" for Germany to be in dominant position in Europe, having lost the Second World War. Heseltine feels the 48% of British voters who voted 'remain' are being ignored. He sees Brexit as a historic loss of power for Britain and feels Britain's interests are in Europe.

In March 2018 Heseltine expressed concern over Theresa May's Brexit negotiations, commenting: "Why is it that after 18 months since the referendum we have not got any closer with these issues? The answer is simple: because no one has got any answer about how to do it." He also said the gulf between what May wanted and what the EU was willing to give was not narrowing and may be widening, adding "While that gap remains industry will continue to make assumptions that will involve moving investment from here to the continent. (...) The downsides are becoming more evident as time passes. We have had a serious devaluation of the currency. We have turned ourselves from the fastest growing to the slowest growing economy in Europe and we have made a complete Horlicks of the Irish border. I am totally with the view of Tony Blair and John Major that this matter has got to go back to parliament and possibly to a referendum or a general election."

Heseltine was one of the signatories of a statement by senior Conservatives calling for a second referendum over Brexit. This stated, "If we are to remain a party of government, it is absolutely critical that we increase our support among younger generations. To do this, we must listen to and engage with their concerns on Brexit. They voted overwhelmingly to Remain in the European Union in 2016 – and since then have become even stronger in their views. Since the referendum, nearly 2 million young people are now of voting age. Of those in this group who are certain to vote, an astounding 87% support the United Kingdom staying in the European Union. If we do not hear their voices, who could blame them for feeling excluded and powerless on this most vital issue. The truth is that if Brexit fails this generation, we risk losing young people for good. Our party's electoral future will be irrevocably blighted." Heseltine participated in various events organised by the People's Vote organisation, including a rally in December 2018 which called for a vote on the Brexit withdrawal agreement. In July 2019, he addressed a rally for a People's Vote in Birmingham and expressed himself critically of the government of Boris Johnson which he accused of being "sworn to an extreme interpretation of the 2016 referendum, bound to articulation based on unfounded and reckless optimism, unrealistic assertions defended by evasion and bombast, blind to the world in which we live".

=== Conservative whip suspension ===
In May 2019, he had the Conservative Party whip suspended after saying he would vote for the Liberal Democrats, rather than the Conservatives, at the 2019 European Parliament election.

On 26 November 2019, in preparation for the 2019 general election, Heseltine said he could not support Boris Johnson because the Prime Minister was pursuing an "utterly disastrous" policy that would make Britain poorer and less influential, and he called on voters to back the Liberal Democrats to deny Johnson a majority in Parliament.

In June 2023, following the report by the Commons Privileges Committee, he said that Johnson had lied to parliament. Speaking on Sky News, he said that Johnson had resigned before the Partygate report was published because he "saw it coming", adding "We've had four days of this report and the story doesn't change: Boris Johnson told a pack of lies. Boris Johnson got out from under, he saw it coming, he knew he hadn't a case to defend. So he resigned before the suspension that he feared could be relevant." In July 2024, the Conservatives restored Heseltine's whip.

== Family and personal life ==
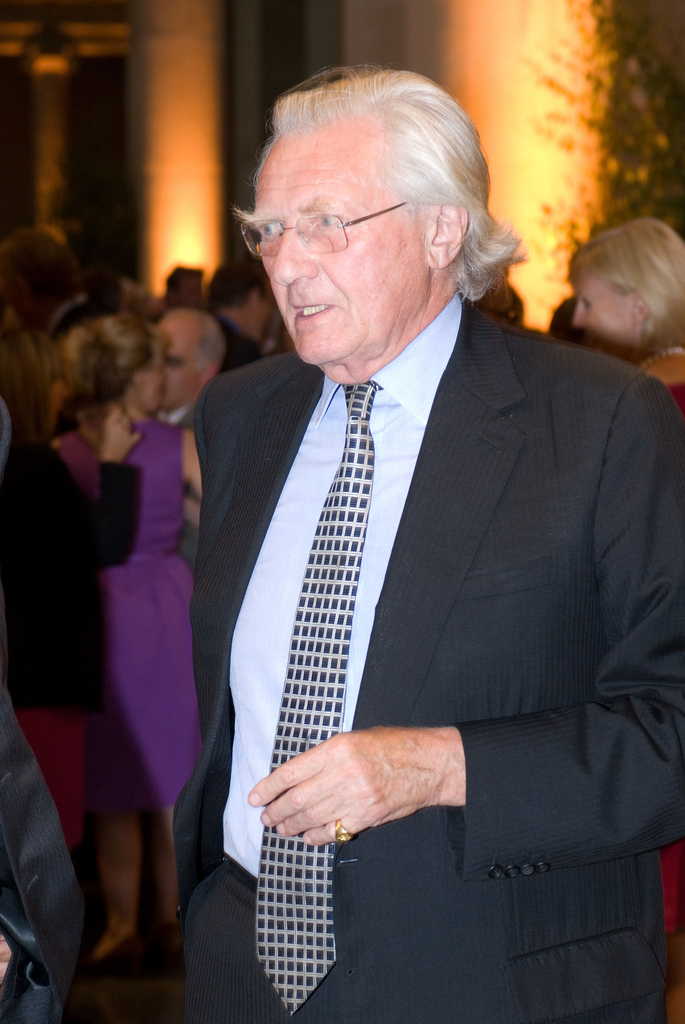
Lord Heseltine, June 2010

Heseltine married Anne Harding Williams in 1962. They have three children: Annabel (born in 1963), Alexandra (born in 1966), and Rupert (born in 1967), as well as nine grandchildren. During the period Heseltine was the MP for Tavistock in Devon (from 1966 to 1974), he became part of a local 'fishing gang' with poet Ted Hughes. His wife was delighted, as an admirer of the poet, but Heseltine himself did not initially know who he was.

At the beginning of November 2016, drawing on an interview with Tatler magazine, it was reported that Heseltine had confessed to strangling his mother's Alsatian in 1964, after the animal had drawn blood, which was falsely interpreted as his having killed the dog. A rumour about such an incident had been in circulation since a 1990 article in The Observer and an unauthorised biography. Heseltine later stated that he had, in fact, subdued the animal using its choke collar after it had attacked him. In an interview with the Press Association, Heseltine said the dog was put down the next day at the vet's insistence, because it had become dangerous and a threat to his pregnant wife and elderly mother.

In January 2017, Heseltine was convicted of careless driving and fined £5,000, following an incident on 19 June 2016 in which he pulled out into the path of a cyclist, causing serious injuries, including a broken arm and shattered knees, which required plates and pins.

== Thenford gardens and arboretum ==
The Heseltines purchased Thenford House and its grounds in 1976. The house was bought privately with the aid of a large loan, and they are thought to have paid around £750,000 (approximately £7.58m at 2025, RPI prices), and to have spent a similar sum on renovating the property. They also own a number of farms in the area.

Over the next 25 years they restored 40 acres (16 ha) of woodland together with the walled garden, medieval fish-ponds, and a 2 acres (0.81 ha) lake. There is also a sculpture garden, which includes a large bronze bust of Lenin, from Latvia. At the turn of the century they decided to create various ornamental features in the garden and increase the range of trees and shrubs in the arboretum. Covering over 70 acres (28 ha) the arboretum is stocked with over 3,000 different species. Their arboretum was featured in a one-off documentary on BBC Two in December 2005. In October 2016 the Heseltines were featured on BBC's Gardeners' World, discussing their garden at Thenford House, parts of which were modelled after the gardens at Château de Villandry. The garden is open to the public by appointment only.

== Honours ==
- List of awards and honours received by Michael Heseltine

== Books ==
- Kenneth Clarke, Kind of Blue, Macmillan, 2016, ISBN 1-509-83719-1
- Michael Heseltine, Raising The Sights – A Tory Perspective, in the Primrose League Gazette, vol.91, no.2, Aug/Sept 1987 edition, London.
- Julian Critchley, Heseltine – The Unauthorised Biography, André Deutsch, London, September 1987, ISBN 0-233-98001-6.
- Michael Crick, Michael Heseltine: A Biography, Hamish Hamilton, 1997, ISBN 0-241-13691-1.
- Heseltine 2000, Heseltine's autobiography, written with the acknowledged assistance of his lifelong friend Anthony Howard.
- Edward Pearce, The Golden Talking-Shop, Oxford University Press, 2016, ISBN 0-198-71723-7, a history of the Oxford Union Society during the first half of the twentieth century, based on official minutes.
- Alexander Stevenson, The Public Sector: Managing the Unmanageable, 2013 (Contributor)
- Anne Heseltine, Michael Heseltine, Thenford: The Creation of an English Garden, Head of Zeus, 2016, ISBN 978-1784979737
- Michael Heseltine, From Acorns to Oaks: An Urgent Agenda to Rebuild Britain, Biteback Publishing, 2025, ISBN 9781785909801

== See also ==
- Opposition to Brexit
- People's Vote

== Notes ==
Parliament of the United Kingdom
Preceded by Henry Studholme	Member of Parliament for Tavistock; 1966–1974	Constituency abolished
Preceded by John Hay	Member of Parliament for Henley; 1974–2001	Succeeded by Boris Johnson
Political offices
Preceded by Albert Murray	Parliamentary Secretary to the Ministry of Transport; 1970	Post abolished
Preceded by Peter Shore	Secretary of State for the Environment; 1979–1983	Succeeded by Tom King
Preceded by John Nott	Secretary of State for Defence; 1983–1986	Succeeded by George Younger
Preceded by Chris Patten	Secretary of State for the Environment; 1990–1992	Succeeded by Michael Howard
Preceded by Peter Lilley	President of the Board of Trade; 1992–1995	Succeeded by Ian Lang
Preceded by Peter Lilley	Secretary of State for Trade and Industry; 1992–1995	Succeeded by Ian Lang
Preceded by Geoffrey Howe	Deputy Prime Minister of the United Kingdom; 1995–1997	Succeeded by John Prescott
Preceded by Barbara Castle	First Secretary of State; 1995–1997	Succeeded by John Prescott
Orders of precedence in the United Kingdom
Preceded by The Lord King of Bridgwater	Gentlemen; Baron Heseltine	Followed by The Lord Kilclooney
