= List of awards and honours received by Michael Heseltine =

Michael Heseltine has received numerous honours in recognition of his career in politics. These include:

== Life peerage ==
Following his retirement from the House of Commons at the 2001 general election, Heseltine was awarded a life peerage allowing him to sit in the House of Lords. He took the title Baron Heseltine, of Thenford in the County of Northamptonshire. He sits with the Conservative Party benches.

== Commonwealth honours ==
Commonwealth realms
Country	Date	Appointment	Post-nominal letters
United Kingdom	1979 –	Member of Her Majesty's Most Honourable Privy Council	PC
Commonwealth realms	2 August 1997 –	Member of the Order of the Companions of Honour	CH

== Other distinctions ==
- (United Kingdom) 1998 President's Medal from the Chartered Institute of Public Relations.
- (United Kingdom) 1999 Gold Medal from the Institute of Sheet Metal Engineering.

=== Scholastic ===
University degrees
Location	Date	School	Degree
England	1954	Pembroke College, Oxford	Second-Class Honours Bachelor of Arts in PPE

Chancellor, visitor, governor, rector, and fellowships
Location	Date	School	Position
England	1986 –	Pembroke College, Oxford	Honorary Fellow
England	2013 –	Liverpool John Moores University	Honorary Fellow
England	13 November 2015 –	University of Northampton	Honorary Fellow
Wales	22 July 2021 –	Cardiff University	Honorary Fellow
Wales	Unknown	Swansea University	Honorary Fellow

Honorary degrees
Location	Date	School	Degree
England	1989	Leeds Beckett University	Doctor of the university (D.Univ)
England	1990	University of Liverpool	Doctor of Laws (LL.D)
Wales	2013	University of South Wales	Doctor of the university (D.Univ)
England	2013	University of Northampton	Doctorate
England	19 July 2013	Aston University	Doctorate
England	March 2014	Birmingham City University	Doctorate

=== Memberships and Fellowships ===
Country	Date	Organisation	Position
United Kingdom	1954 – 1955	Oxford Union	President
United Kingdom	–	Carlton Club	Member
United Kingdom	1991 –	Royal Institute of British Architects	Honorary Fellow (FRIBA)
United Kingdom	2009 –	Royal Horticultural Society	Vice President
United Kingdom	24 June 2013 –	Society for the Environment	Honorary Fellow
United Kingdom	–	The Marketing Society	Fellow

== Freedom of the City ==
- (England) 13 March 2012: Liverpool.
- (England) 13 September 2012: London.

== Places named after Heseltine ==
- (England) Heseltine Institute for Public Policy, Practice and Place at the University of Liverpool.
- (England) The Heseltine Gallery at Chenderit School
