= Peter Horsfall =

British Army officer (1930–2021)

Major Peter Horsfall MBE
- Born: 30 May 1930; Leeds, West Yorkshire, England
- Died: 4 September 2021 (aged 91); London, England
- Spouse: Mary Horsfall (m. 1950)
- Military career
- Allegiance: United Kingdom
- Branch: British Army
- Service years: 1946–1980
- Rank: Major
- Service number: 2671091
- Unit: Coldstream Guards
- Commands: Major Quartermaster (1972–1980)
- Conflicts: Malayan Emergency; Mau Mau Rebellion; Aden Emergency; The Troubles
- Awards: Member of the Order of the British Empire; General Officer Commander’s Commendation

Major Frederick Peter Horsfall MBE (30 May 1930 – 4 September 2021) was a British Army officer who served in various military operations in the 20th century. He later became the Staff Superintendent at the House of Lords following his retirement in 1980. His career is recorded in his 1999 published memoir ‘Hard to Believe: Too Old at Sixteen’.

== Career ==
=== Military service ===
At the age of 16, Horsfall first attempted to enlist in the Royal Marines in 1946 but was denied this (due to his age), eventually leading to him joining the Coldstream Guards that same year as a Drummer Boy. He would gradually climb the ladders of seniority throughout his various engagements in operations that the Coldstream Guards were asked to perform. He eventually gained the post of Major Quartermaster (QM) in a variety of posts that gave Horsfall the responsibility of supervising the exchange of supplies for the Coldstream Guards. He eventually retired in 1980, however, below is a description of his various engagements whilst serving in the British Army.

Horsfall served in the Malayan Emergency that occurred between British Colonial forces and Communist uprisings. In this situation, Horsfall fought in Malaya from 1948 until the mid-1950s.

Following a period of work in the UK, Horsfall was later sent to support the logistics of the British Army's suppression of the Mau Mau Rebellion in Kenya before the UK granted it independence in 1963. Horsfall at that time served for 18 month stints with the 2nd Battalion, accumulating a period from 1956 until his return to the UK in 1961.

After an extended period at the Royal Military Academy Sandhurst in England where he became Superintendent Sergeant, thereby instructing officer graduates for a period, he became a Drill Sergeant in the British Army Barracks in Münster, Germany. Horsfall was later sent to respond to the logistic issues regarding the Aden Emergency following the removal of British Colonial troops in the territory. He was promoted Company Sergeant Major, before overseeing a significant attack, which led to the deaths of a number of his company members. This prompted his superiors to eventually nominate him for the Order of the British Empire in 1972 due to his efforts.

Horsfall completed his service in the late 1970s while being posted in Northern Ireland, at the height of The Troubles. In this time, he was promoted to the responsibility of Major, which led to increased collaboration with the General Officers Commanding over Northern Ireland, which included Sir Timothy Creasey and Sir Richard Lawson.

=== House of Lords ===
In 1981, Horsfall was invited by Sir David House to become Staff Superintendent at the House of Lords as House was Black Rod at the time. In this role, Horsfall served Black Rod (which later were Sir John Gingel and Sir Richard Thomas) and Peers between 1981 and 2004. Such recordings of his interactions included Baroness Thatcher and Denis Compton amongst others according to his memoirs.

== Honours and awards ==
Member of the Order of the British Empire (MBE)
General Service Medal (1918–1962)
General Service Medal (1962–2007)
Queen Elizabeth II Silver Jubilee Medal
Medal for Long Service and Good Conduct (Military)
