= Douglas Allen, Baron Croham =

British politician and civil servant (1917-2011)

The Right Honourable The Lord Croham GCB FRSA

Head of the Home Civil Service
- In office 1974–1978
- Preceded by: Sir William Armstrong
- Succeeded by: Sir Ian Bancroft

Member of the House of Lords
- Lord Temporal
- Life peerage 8 February 1978 – 11 September 2011

Personal details
- Born: 15 December 1917
- Died: 11 September 2011 (aged 93)
- Education: Wallington County Grammar School
- Alma mater: London School of Economics

Douglas Albert Vivian Allen, Baron Croham GCB FRSA (15 December 1917 – 11 September 2011) was a British politician and civil servant.

== Life ==
The son of Albert John Allen, Douglas Allen was aged only one when his father was killed in action during the First World War. Allen was educated at Wallington County Grammar School and at the London School of Economics (LSE), whence he graduated with a Bachelor of Science in statistics in 1938. During the Second World War, from 1940 to 1945, he served in the Royal Artillery. Having entered the British civil service, Allen worked in the Board of Trade between 1939 and 1947, and in HM Treasury between 1948 and 1958.

He became an Under-Secretary at the Ministry of Health in 1958, a post he held until 1960, when he returned to the Treasury. Made a Third Secretary in 1962 and a Permanent Secretary in 1966, he worked for the Department of Economic Affairs between 1964 and 1968. Allen was Permanent Secretary at the Treasury from 1968 to 1974, and Permanent Secretary of the Civil Service Department and Head of the Home Civil Service from 1974 to 1977.

== Affiliations ==
Allen was chairman of British National Oil Corporation (BNOC) from 1982 to 1986, of Guinness Peat Group (1982–87), and of Trinity Insurance Ltd (1987–92). He was president of the Institute for Fiscal Studies (IFS; 1978–92), and of the British Institute of Energy Economics (1986–94). He was chairman of the Anglo-German Foundation (1982–98). He was a governor of the LSE (1977–2004) and of Wallington County Grammar School (1993–2003). He was a member of the First Division Association (FDA) and vice-president of the Anglo-German Association. He was a member of the Institute of Directors and a companion of the British Institute of Management.

== Honours ==
Allen was a Fellow of the Royal Society of Arts (FRSA) and was made an Honorary Doctor of Social Science (DSocSc) by the University of Southampton. He was appointed a Companion of the Order of the Bath (CB) in 1963, a Knight Commander of the same Order (KCB) in 1967, and a Knight Grand Cross of the same Order (GCB) in 1973. On 8 February 1978, he was created a life peer as Baron Croham, of the London Borough of Croydon.

Coat of arms of Douglas Allen, Baron Croham
Crest An alaunt Proper gorged with a crown Or reposing its dexter paw upon a purse Azure corded and tasselled the cords tied over the paw in a bow Or. Escutcheon Argent on a base checky Or and Azure an oak tree Proper fructed Or the trunk supported by two crows respectant Proper beaked and legged Gold. Supporters Dexter a griffin Azure semy of roundels Or and argent winged beaked legged and tufted Or, sinister a pantheon Azure semy of mullets of six points Or and Argent winged and hooved Or. Motto Semper Paratus

== Personal life ==
Allen was married to Sybil Eileen Allegro from 1941 until his wife's death in 1994; the couple had two sons and a daughter.

== Links ==
- "DodOnline". Archived from the original on 8 February 2007.

Government offices
Preceded by none	Second Permanent Secretary, Department of Economic Affairs; 1966	Succeeded by none
Preceded by Sir Eric Roll	Permanent Secretary, Department of Economic Affairs; 1966–1968	Succeeded by Sir William Nield
Preceded by Sir William Armstrong	Head of the Home Civil Service; 1974–1977	Succeeded by Sir Ian Bancroft
Preceded by Sir William Armstrong	Permanent Secretary, Civil Service Department; 1974–1977	Succeeded by Sir Ian Bancroft
