= William Armstrong, Baron Armstrong of Sanderstead =

British civil servant and banker

The Right Honourable The Lord Armstrong of Sanderstead GCB MVO PC
- Armstrong in November 1962.

Head of the Home Civil Service
- In office 1968–1974
- Monarch: Elizabeth II
- Prime Minister: Harold Wilson; Edward Heath
- Preceded by: Sir Edward Bridges
- Succeeded by: Sir Douglas Allen

Personal details
- Born: 3 March 1915 Clapton, London, England
- Died: 12 July 1980 (aged 65) Oxford, England
- Spouse: Gwendoline Bennett (m. 1942)
- Children: Peter William Armstrong, Jan Turnbull
- Education: Exeter College, Oxford

William Armstrong, Baron Armstrong of Sanderstead GCB MVO PC (3 March 1915 – 12 July 1980) was a British civil servant and banker.

== Early life ==
The son of William Armstrong and Priscilla Hopkins, he was born in Clapton in London. Armstrong was educated at Bec School in Tooting and Exeter College, Oxford. From 1938 to 1943, Armstrong worked for the Board of Education.

== Career ==
From 1943 to 1945 he was private secretary to the Secretary of the War Cabinet Sir Edward Bridges. Between 1949 and 1953, he was principal private secretary to the three successive Chancellors of the Exchequer Sir Stafford Cripps, Hugh Gaitskell and then R. A. Butler.

Armstrong was Under-Secretary to the Overseas Finance Division of the Treasury from 1953 to 1957, and from 1957 to 1958 of the Home Finance Division. Between 1958 and 1962, he was Third Secretary and Treasury Officer of Accounts. In 1962, he became Permanent Secretary to the Treasury and, in 1968, Head of the Home Civil Service. Due to his influence in Edward Heath's government he was called the "Deputy Prime Minister". During its dispute with the miners over the government's imposition of a Three-Day Week, however, Armstrong suffered a nervous breakdown.

He returned to office after a period of sick leave but shortly after made known to his Second Permanent Secretary, Ian Bancroft, that he had been approached to accept appointment as Chairman of the Midland Bank. There was internal discussion between Bancroft, the Cabinet Secretary, and the Prime Minister (by this time not Heath but Harold Wilson) as to the propriety of an official who was so close to the government's handling of economic affairs moving to the chairmanship of a clearing bank. Somewhat earlier the outgoing Chancellor of the Exchequer, Anthony Barber, had taken up the chairmanship of the Standard Chartered Bank. The Prime Minister decided that Armstrong had the right to accept the post, and he resigned from the Civil Service to do so. It is not true, as is sometimes stated, that Armstrong was replaced as head of the Civil Service.

== Other work ==
He was on the governing body of Abingdon School.

== Awards ==
In 1945, Armstrong was made a Member of the Royal Victorian Order (MVO). He also was appointed a Companion of the Order of the Bath (CB) in 1957, promoted to a Knight Commander (KCB) in 1963 and eventually a Knight Grand Cross (GCB) in 1968. He was sworn in as a member of the Privy Council in 1973. On 29 January 1975, he was created a life peer with the title Baron Armstrong of Sanderstead, of the City of Westminster. Armstrong died in Radcliffe Infirmary in Oxford.

Armstrong also received an Honorary Doctorate from Heriot-Watt University in 1975.

== Personal life ==
In 1942, he married Gwendoline Enid Bennett, daughter of John Bennett. She died in 2020 at the age of 101.

== Sources ==
- Obituary of Sir Edward Heath, The Independent, 18 July 2005.
- Kevin Theakston and Philip Connelly. William Armstrong and British Policy Making. (2018). Palgrave Macmillan. ISBN 978-1137571588

Government offices
Preceded by Sir Edward Bridges	Head of the Home Civil Service; 1968–1974	Succeeded by Sir Douglas Allen
Preceded by none	Permanent Secretary, Civil Service Department; 1968–1974	Succeeded by Sir Douglas Allen
