= John Cassels (civil servant) =

English civil servant

Sir John Seton Cassels, CB, FRSA (10 October 1928 – 27 February 2016) was an English civil servant and educationalist.

== Life ==
Cassels was educated at Sedbergh School. After studying at Trinity College, Cambridge and the British School at Rome, Cassels entered the civil service in 1954 and reached the rank of under-secretary before leaving in 1971.

After a brief period in the private sector, Cassels returned to government service as chief executive of the Training Services Agency (1972–75). He was then director-general of the Manpower Services Commission (1975–81), Second Permanent Secretary of the Management and Personnel Office (1981–83) and director-general of the National Economic Development Office (1983–88). In retirement, he was chairman of UK Skills (1990–2000), director of the National Commission on Education (1991–95), chairman of the Independent Inquiry into the Role and Responsibilities of the Police (1994–96) and chairman of the Modern Apprenticeship Advisory Committee (2001).

Government offices
| Preceded by none (role assumed from Civil Service Department; Second Permanent Secretary there: Sir John Herbecq) | Second Permanent Secretary at the Cabinet Office (Management and Personnel Office); 1981–1983 | Succeeded by Peter le Cheminant |
