= Eric Roll, Baron Roll of Ipsden =

British economist and life peer (1907–2005)

The Right Honourable The Lord Roll of Ipsden KCMG CB
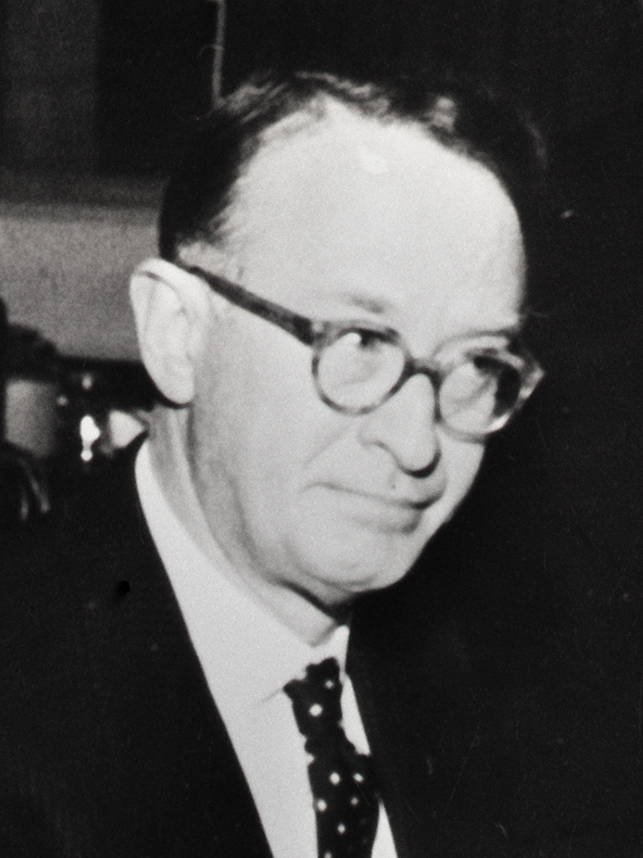
- Roll in 1961

Member of the House of Lords
- Lord Temporal
- Life peerage 19 July 1977 – 30 March 2005

Personal details
- Born: 1 December 1907
- Died: 30 March 2005 (aged 97)

Eric Roll, Baron Roll of Ipsden KCMG CB (born Erich Roll; 1 December 1907 – 30 March 2005) was a British academic economist, public servant and banker. He was made a life peer in 1977.

== Biography ==
Roll was born in Nowosielitza, Austro-Hungarian Empire and grew up near Czernowitz in Bukovina, which became part of Romania and is now part of Ukraine. His parents, Matthias and Fanny Roll, were of Middle European origin.

His father was a bank manager, and his mother's brother was a distinguished member of the law faculty at the University of Vienna. When World War I saw Russian troops burn down the village, his family took refuge in Vienna. His parents then sent him to England in the 1920s and he studied at Birmingham University. Shortly afterwards, he completed his PhD and published his first book. He mixed with artistic and creative circles.

By the age of 28, Roll became Professor of Economics and Commerce at University College, Hull, appointed with the backing of John Maynard Keynes and Lord Stamp. Perhaps his most enduring work from this time was the publication in 1938 of his book A History of Economic Thought, which subsequently went through several editions. During World War II, however, he was recruited to the civil service as deputy head of the British Food Mission (1941–1946), where he was principally involved in the procurement of food supplies - most notably dried eggs. He made a number of contacts in the United States and rejected the offer to head the General Agreement on Tariffs and Trade, instead joining the British Ministry of Food. His economic experience and contacts made him invaluable in the post-war government and he was the British representative in the Paris discussions on Marshall aid. He played an important role in the setting up of European and trans-Atlantic institutions before rejoining the Ministry of Agriculture, Fisheries and Food.

Roll was about to accept the vice-chancellorship of Liverpool University, but was asked to go to Washington, D.C. as economic minister at the British embassy from 1963 to 1964. Then, when Labour won the 1964 election, he became permanent secretary of the new Department of Economic Affairs, despite not agreeing with its development.

Roll was also a director of the Bank of England between 1968 and 1977, chairman of the merchant bankers SG Warburg, and a director of The Times.

Roll became Joint President of the Policy Studies Institute, London, in 1978. He was Chancellor of Southampton University 1974-84.

He was chairman of the Bilderberg meetings between 1986 and 1989.

== Honours ==
Roll was appointed a Companion of the Order of St Michael and St George (CMG) in 1949, a Companion of the Order of the Bath (CB) in 1956 and a Knight Commander of the Order of St Michael and St George (KCMG) in 1962 and was made an officier of the Legion d'Honneur. He was created a life peer as Baron Roll of Ipsden, of Ipsden in the County of Oxfordshire, on 19 July 1977.

== Personal life ==
Roll married Winifred Taylor in 1934 and they had two daughters, Joanna and Elizabeth. Lady Roll died in 1998.

== Major publications ==
- A History of Economic Thought. London: Faber & Faber. 1938.
- An Early Experiment in Industrial Organization: History of the Firm of Boulton and Watt 1775-1805, Routledge, 1968
- Economics, Government and Business. London: Athlone Press. 1976. ISBN 978-0-485-16431-2.
- Crowded Hours (autobiography). London and Boston: Faber & Faber. 1985. ISBN 978-0-571-13497-7.

Government offices
Preceded by none	Permanent Secretary of the Department of Economic Affairs; 1964–1966	Succeeded by Sir Douglas Allen
