= William Nield =

Sir William Alan Nield, GCMG, KCB (21 September 1913 – 13 September 1994) was an English civil servant. Nield studied at Stockport Grammar School and St Edmund Hall, Oxford. He served with the Royal Air Force and Royal Canadian Air Force in the Second World War before he joined the Civil Service in 1946. After five years as an under-secretary at the Ministry for Agriculture, Food and Fisheries, in 1964 he was appointed under-secretary and then, from 1965, deputy secretary at the Department of Economic Affairs (DEA). He spent two years as a deputy secretary at the Cabinet Office (1966–68) before returning to the DEA as Permanent Secretary in 1968; it was a short-lived appointment for the department was abolished the following year. Nield was nonetheless appointed a KCB in 1968.

Nield then joined the Cabinet Office as Second Permanent Secretary (1969–72) with responsibility for "coordinating the advice given to Ministers on matters arising from the British application to the Common Market"; he was responsible for reopening negotiations to join the European Communities, which the UK eventually did in 1973. He was appointed a GCMG in 1972.

Nield's final appointment in the civil service was to be Permanent Secretary at the Northern Ireland Office (1972–73); he was responsible for advising the government on the nature of direct rule. After retiring from the civil service in 1973, he was Deputy Chairman of Rolls-Royce (1972) Ltd from 1973 to 1975.

Government offices
Preceded by Sir Douglas Allen	Permanent Secretary of the Department of Economic Affairs; 1968–1969	Succeeded by none
Preceded by none	Additional Permanent Secretary at the Cabinet Office; 1969–1972	Succeeded by Sir John Hunt
