= Department of Economic Affairs =

Department of Economic Affairs may refer to:

- Department of Economic Affairs (UK), a 1960s UK government body
- Department of Economic Affairs, a department of the Ministry of Finance in India
- Federal Department of Economic Affairs, a Swiss government body
