= Ian Bancroft =

British civil servant (1922–1996)

The Right Honourable The Lord Bancroft GCB

Head of the Home Civil Service
- In office 1978–1981

Personal details
- Born: 23 December 1922 Barrow-in-Furness, England
- Died: 19 November 1996 (aged 73) London, England
- Spouse: Jean Swaine
- Children: 2 sons, 1 daughter
- Education: Balliol College, Oxford
- Occupation: Civil servant
- Awards: Knight Grand Cross of the Order of the Bath (GCB)

Ian Powell Bancroft, Baron Bancroft GCB (23 December 1922 – 19 November 1996) was a British senior civil servant.

== Life ==
He was born at Barrow-in-Furness, the son of a teacher. He was educated at Sir William Turner's Grammar School, Coatham and Balliol College, Oxford, where he read English. He served with the Rifle Brigade in France from 1942 to 1943, reaching the rank of Captain.

After leaving the Army he joined the Civil Service, serving as Private Secretary to the Second Secretary to the Treasury Sir Henry Wilson Smith from 1948 to 1950, to the Chancellor of the Exchequer Rab Butler from 1953 to 1955, and also to Butler as Lord Privy Seal from 1955 to 1957. He was Principal Private Secretary to the Chancellor of the Exchequer Reginald Maudling in 1964, continuing under James Callaghan until 1966, when he became an Under-Secretary to the Treasury.

In 1968 he moved to the same position in the new Civil Service Department, then to the Department of the Environment as Deputy Secretary and Director General of Organisation and Establishments from 1970 to 1972. From 1972 to 1973 he was a Commissioner of HM Customs and Excise, then Second Permanent Secretary at the Civil Service Department until 1975.

He returned to the Department of the Environment as Permanent Secretary from 1975 to 1977 before becoming Permanent Secretary to the Civil Service Department and Head of the Home Civil Service in 1978. In 1981 Margaret Thatcher abolished the Civil Service Department, effectively ending his career.

== Honours ==
He was appointed a Companion of the Order of the Bath in the 1971 Birthday Honours, a Knight Commander in the 1975 New Year Honours, and a Knight Grand Cross in 1979 New Year Honours.

On 15 February 1982 he was created a life peer as Baron Bancroft, of Coatham in the County of Cleveland, and took his seat in the House of Lords.

== Personal life ==
He was married in 1950 to Jean Swaine, by whom he had two sons and a daughter. Lord Bancroft died in London in 1996.

Government offices
Preceded by none office last held by Sir David Pitblado	Second Permanent Secretary of the Civil Service Department; 1973–1975	Succeeded by Sir John Herbecq
Preceded by Sir James Jones	Permanent Secretary at the Department of the Environment; 1975–1977	Succeeded by Sir John Garlick
Preceded by Sir Douglas Allen	Head of the Home Civil Service; 1978–1981	Succeeded by Sir Douglas Wass and Sir Robert Armstrong
Preceded by Sir William Armstrong	Permanent Secretary, Civil Service Department; 1978–1981	Succeeded by None
