= Harold Wilson =

Prime Minister of the United Kingdom (1964–1970; 1974–1976)

The Right Honourable The Lord Wilson of Rievaulx KG OBE PC FRS FSS
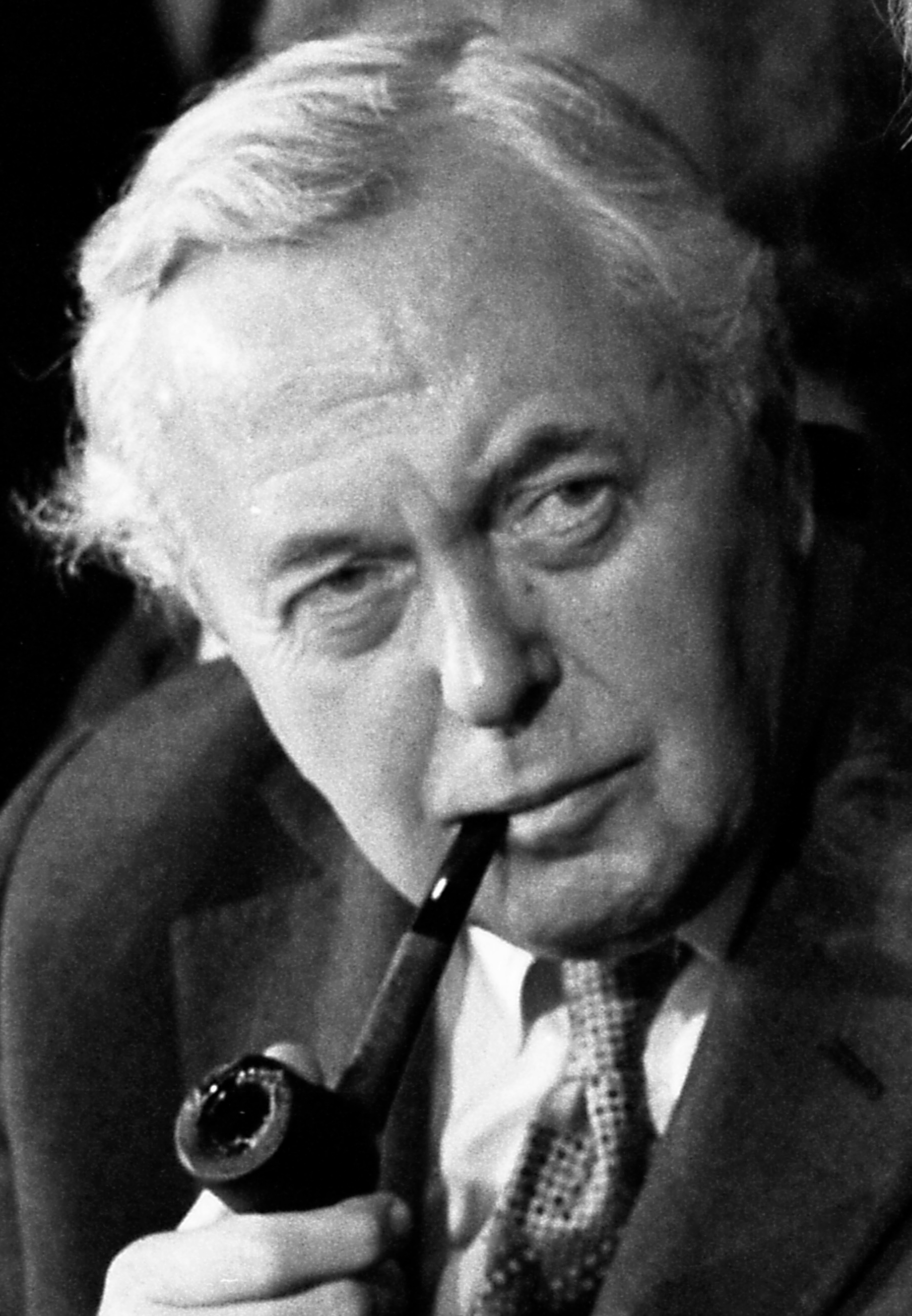
- Wilson in 1975

Prime Minister of the United Kingdom
- In office 4 March 1974 – 5 April 1976
- Monarch: Elizabeth II
- Preceded by: Edward Heath
- Succeeded by: James Callaghan
- In office 16 October 1964 – 19 June 1970
- Monarch: Elizabeth II
- First Secretary: George Brown; Michael Stewart; Barbara Castle
- Preceded by: Alec Douglas-Home
- Succeeded by: Edward Heath

Leader of the Labour Party
- In office 14 February 1963 – 5 April 1976
- Deputy: George Brown; Roy Jenkins; Edward Short
- Preceded by: Hugh Gaitskell (Note: George Brown acted from 18 January to 14 February 1963)
- Succeeded by: James Callaghan
Senior political offices
Leader of the Opposition
In office 19 June 1970 – 4 March 1974
Monarch	Elizabeth II
Prime Minister	Edward Heath
Preceded by	Edward Heath
Succeeded by	Edward Heath
In office 14 February 1963 – 16 October 1964
Monarch	Elizabeth II
Prime Minister	Harold Macmillan; Alec Douglas-Home
Preceded by	George Brown
Succeeded by	Alec Douglas-Home
Ministerial offices
President of the Board of Trade
In office 29 September 1947 – 23 April 1951
Prime Minister	Clement Attlee
Preceded by	Stafford Cripps
Succeeded by	Hartley Shawcross
Secretary for Overseas Trade
In office 10 July 1947 – 29 September 1947
Prime Minister	Clement Attlee
Preceded by	Hilary Marquand
Succeeded by	Arthur Bottomley
Parliamentary Secretary to the Ministry of Works
In office 26 July 1945 – 10 July 1947
Prime Minister	Clement Attlee
Minister	George Tomlinson; Charles Key
Preceded by	Reginald Manningham-Buller
Succeeded by	Evan Durbin
Shadow cabinet offices
Shadow Foreign Secretary
In office 2 November 1961 – 14 February 1963
Leader	Hugh Gaitskell; George Brown
Preceded by	Denis Healey
Succeeded by	Patrick Gordon Walker
Shadow Chancellor of the Exchequer
In office 14 December 1955 – 2 November 1961
Leader	Hugh Gaitskell
Preceded by	Hugh Gaitskell
Succeeded by	James Callaghan

Member of the House of Lords
- Lord Temporal
- Life peerage 16 September 1983 – 23 May 1995

Member of Parliament
- In office 5 July 1945 – 13 May 1983
- Preceded by: Stephen King-Hall
- Succeeded by: Constituency abolished
- Constituency: Ormskirk (1945–1950); Huyton (1950–1983)

Personal details
- Born: James Harold Wilson; 11 March 1916 Cowlersley, Huddersfield, West Riding of Yorkshire, England
- Died: 23 May 1995 (aged 79) (Note: Most news sources give Wilson's date of death as 24 May 1995. However, his biography on gov.uk states that he died on 23 May 1995, as does his entry in the Oxford Dictionary of National Biography, which cites his death certificate.) London, England
- Resting place: St Mary's Old Church, St Mary's, Isles of Scilly, England
- Party: Labour
- Spouse: Mary Baldwin (m. 1940)
- Children: 2, including Robin
- Education: Jesus College, Oxford
- Occupation: Politician; author; lecturer

James Harold Wilson, Baron Wilson of Rievaulx (11 March 1916 – 23 May 1995), was a British statesman who served as Prime Minister of the United Kingdom from 1964 to 1970 and from 1974 to 1976, the most recent person to serve in the position for two non-consecutive terms. He was Leader of the Labour Party from 1963 to 1976, Leader of the Opposition twice — from 1963 to 1964 and from 1970 to 1974 — and a Member of Parliament (MP) from 1945 to 1983. Wilson is the only Labour leader to have formed a government after a general election four separate times.

Born in Huddersfield, West Riding of Yorkshire, to a politically active lower middle-class family, Wilson studied philosophy, politics and economics at Jesus College, Oxford. He was later an Economic History lecturer at New College, Oxford, and a research fellow at University College, Oxford. Elected to Parliament in 1945, Wilson was appointed to the Attlee government as a Parliamentary secretary; he became Secretary for Overseas Trade in 1947, and was elevated to the Cabinet shortly thereafter as President of the Board of Trade. Following Labour's defeat at the 1955 election, Wilson joined the Shadow Cabinet as Shadow Chancellor, and was moved to the role of Shadow Foreign Secretary in 1961. When Labour leader Hugh Gaitskell died in January 1963, Wilson won the leadership election to replace him, becoming Leader of the Opposition.

Wilson led Labour first to a narrow victory in the 1964 election, and then with an increased majority in 1966. During this period, Britain enjoyed low unemployment and economic prosperity, but also a persistent balance of payments deficit that forced Wilson to devalue the pound in 1967. His government oversaw significant societal changes, abolishing both capital punishment and theatre censorship, partially decriminalising male homosexuality in England and Wales, relaxing divorce laws, limiting immigration, outlawing racial discrimination, and liberalising birth control and abortion law. Meanwhile, the steel sector was effectively nationalised and the Ministry of Technology established to promote science in industry. In response to the intensifying sectarian violence in Northern Ireland, Wilson sent over British troops to contain the violence in 1969, which contributed to escalating the Troubles.

After unexpectedly losing the 1970 election to Edward Heath's Conservatives, Wilson remained as leader of the party, resuming the role of Leader of the Opposition for another four years. The February 1974 election resulted in a hung parliament, and after coalition talks failed between the Conservatives and Liberal Party Wilson was appointed prime minister for a second time on 4 March. He called a snap election eight months later, which gave Labour a small majority. During his second government, he oversaw the referendum that confirmed the UK's membership of the European Communities, the creation of the Northern Ireland Constitutional Convention as a step toward devolution, and the refusal to commit British troops in the Vietnam War, but also worsening economic conditions and rising pressure on sterling. On 5 April 1976, Wilson suddenly stepped down as prime minister, citing his steadily worsening mental and physical health. He was succeeded by Foreign Secretary James Callaghan. Wilson remained in the House of Commons until retiring in 1983, when he was elevated to the House of Lords as Lord Wilson of Rievaulx. Suffering from Alzheimer's disease, he maintained a relatively low profile in his later years until his death in May 1995.

While seen by admirers as leading the Labour Party through difficult political issues with considerable skill, Wilson's reputation was low when he left office, and is still disputed in historiography. Some scholars praise his unprecedented electoral success for a Labour prime minister and holistic approach to governance, while others criticise his political style and handling of economic issues. His stated ambitions of substantially improving Britain's long-term economic performance, reducing inequality and applying technology more democratically were to some extent unfulfilled.

== Early life ==
James Harold Wilson was born on 11 March 1916 at Warneford Road, Cowlersley, in the western suburbs of the mill town of Huddersfield, in the West Riding of Yorkshire, England. He came from a political family: his father James Herbert Wilson was a works chemist who had been active in the Liberal Party, serving as Winston Churchill's deputy election agent in a 1908 by-election, but later joined the Labour Party. His mother Ethel (née Seddon) was a schoolteacher before her marriage; in 1901 her brother Harold Seddon settled in Western Australia and became the 8th President of the Western Australian Legislative Council in 1946. When Wilson was eight, he visited London and a much-reproduced photograph was taken of him standing on the doorstep of 10 Downing Street. At the age of ten, he went with his family to Australia, where he became fascinated with the pomp and glamour of politics. On the way home, he told his mother, "I am going to be prime minister."

=== Education ===
Wilson won a scholarship to attend Royds Hall Grammar School in Huddersfield, Yorkshire. His father, working as an industrial chemist, was made redundant in December 1930, and it took him nearly two years to find work; he moved to Spital, on the Wirral Peninsula, to do so. Wilson continued his education in the Sixth Form at the Wirral Grammar School for Boys, where he became Head Boy.

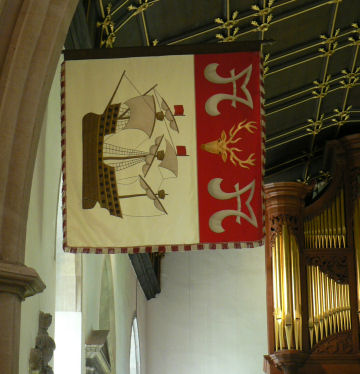
Garter banner of Harold Wilson in the chapel at Jesus College, Oxford, where he studied PPE

Wilson did well at school and, although he missed getting a scholarship, he obtained an exhibition; this, when topped up by a county grant, enabled him to study at Jesus College, Oxford, from 1934. At Oxford, Wilson was moderately active in politics as a member of the Liberal Party but was strongly influenced by G. D. H. Cole. His politics tutor, R. B. McCallum, considered Wilson to be the best student he ever had. He graduated in PPE (philosophy, politics and economics) with "an outstanding first class Bachelor of Arts degree, with alphas on every paper" in the final examinations, and a series of major academic awards. Biographer Roy Jenkins wrote:

Academically his results put him among prime ministers in the category of Peel, Gladstone, Asquith, and no one else. But...he lacked originality. What he was superb at was the quick assimilation of knowledge, combined with an ability to keep it ordered in his mind and to present it lucidly in a form welcome to his examiners.

He continued in academia, becoming a research assistant to William Beveridge in the late-1930s, he also found work lecturing part-time at University College from 1938.

=== War service ===
On the outbreak of the Second World War, Wilson volunteered for military service, but was classed as a specialist and moved into the civil service instead. For much of this time, he was a research assistant to William Beveridge, the Master of University College, working on the issues of unemployment and the trade cycle. Wilson later became a statistician and economist for the coal industry. He was Director of Economics and Statistics at the Ministry of Fuel and Power in 1943–44 and was made an OBE for his services.

He was to remain passionately interested in statistics, becoming a Fellow of the Royal Statistical Society in 1943. As President of the Board of Trade, he was the driving force behind the Statistics of Trade Act 1947, which is still the authority governing most economic statistics in Britain. He was instrumental as prime minister in appointing Claus Moser as head of the Central Statistical Office, and was president of the Royal Statistical Society between 1972 and 1973.

== Member of Parliament (1945–1947) ==
As the war drew to an end, he searched for a seat to contest at the impending general election. He was selected for the constituency of Ormskirk, then held by Stephen King-Hall. Wilson agreed to be adopted as the candidate immediately rather than delay until the election was called, and was therefore compelled to resign from his position in the Civil Service. He served as Praelector in Economics at University College between his resignation and his election to the House of Commons. He also used this time to write A New Deal for Coal, which used his wartime experience to argue for the nationalisation of the coal mines on the grounds of the improved efficiency he predicted would ensue.

In the 1945 general election, Wilson won his seat in the Labour landslide. To his surprise, he was immediately appointed to the government by Prime Minister Clement Attlee as Parliamentary Secretary to the Ministry of Works. Two years later, he became Secretary for Overseas Trade, in which capacity he made several official trips to the Soviet Union to negotiate supply contracts.

The boundaries of his Ormskirk constituency were significantly altered before the general election of 1950. He stood instead for the new seat of Huyton near Liverpool, and was narrowly elected; he served there for 33 years until 1983.

== Cabinet minister, 1947–1951 ==
=== Bonfire of controls ===
Wilson was appointed President of the Board of Trade on 29 September 1947, becoming, at the age of 31, the youngest member of a British Cabinet in the 20th century. Initially Wilson favoured a more interventionist policy, seeking requirements for government officials to be seated on private boards of directors, further price controls, and nationalisations of private industries which opposed government policy. However, he abandoned these plans after his colleagues disagreed. He made it a priority to reduce wartime rationing, which he referred to as a "bonfire of controls". Wilson decided that the massive number of wartime controls was slowing the conversion to peacetime prosperity and he was committed to removing them as fast as possible. He ended rationing of potatoes, bread and jam, as well as shoes and some other clothing controls.

In November 1948 Wilson's Board of Trade removed the need for over 200,000 licences and permits. By March 1949 he promised to remove the need for another 900,000, although meat remained in short supply and was still rationed, as was petrol. Henry Irvine argues that Wilson's success with the bonfire of controls established his reputation as a modernizing specialist, with both the general public and the political elite. Irving also argues that the selection timing and especially the publicity Wilson devoted to the bonfire represented the emerging skills of a brilliant young politician. While each major bonfire was justified in terms of technical economic advantages, it was selected and publicised widely to reach the largest possible audience so that everybody could understand that their bread and jam became free again.

=== Three ambitious young men ===
In mid-1949, with Chancellor of the Exchequer Stafford Cripps having gone to Switzerland in an attempt to recover his health, Wilson was one of a group of three young ministers, all of them former economics dons and wartime civil servants, convened to advise Prime Minister Attlee on financial matters. The others were Douglas Jay (Economic Secretary to the Treasury) and Hugh Gaitskell (Minister of Fuel and Power), both of whom soon grew to distrust him. Jay wrote of Wilson's role in the debates over whether or not to devalue sterling that "he changed sides three times within eight days and finished up facing both ways". Wilson was given the task during his Swiss holiday of taking a letter to Cripps informing him of the decision to devalue, to which Cripps had been opposed. Wilson had tarnished his reputation in both political and official circles. Although a successful minister, he was regarded as self-important. He was not seriously considered for the job of Chancellor when Cripps stepped down in October 1950—it was given to Gaitskell—possibly in part because of his cautious role during devaluation.

Wilson was becoming known in the Labour Party as a left-winger, and joined Aneurin Bevan and John Freeman in resigning from the government in April 1951 in protest at the introduction of National Health Service (NHS) medical charges to meet the financial demands imposed by the Korean War. At this time, Wilson was not yet regarded as a heavyweight politician: Hugh Dalton referred to him scornfully as "Nye [Bevan]'s dog".

After Labour lost the 1951 election, he became the Chairman of Keep Left, Bevan's political group. At the bitter Morecambe Conference in late 1952, Wilson was one of the Bevanites elected as constituency representatives to Labour's National Executive Committee (NEC), whilst senior right-wingers such as Dalton and Herbert Morrison were voted off.

== In Opposition (1951–1964) ==
=== Shadow Cabinet, 1954–1963 ===
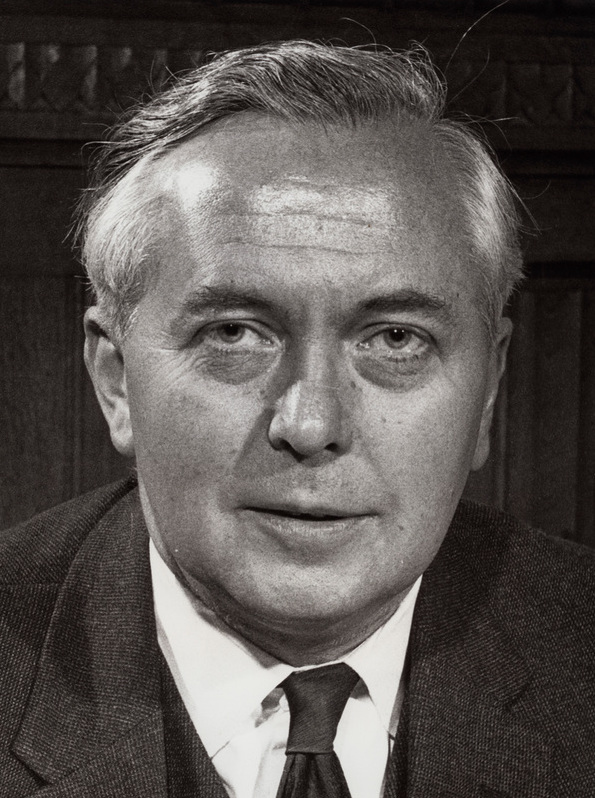
Wilson in 1962

Wilson had never made much secret that his support of the left-wing Aneurin Bevan was opportunistic. In early 1954, Bevan resigned from the Shadow Cabinet (elected by Labour MPs when the party was in opposition) over Labour's support for the setting-up of the Southeast Asia Treaty Organization (SEATO). Wilson, who had been runner-up in the elections, stepped up to fill the vacant place. He was supported in this by Richard Crossman, but his actions angered Bevan and the other Bevanites.

Wilson's course in intra-party matters in the 1950s and early 1960s left him neither fully accepted nor trusted by the left or the right in the Labour Party. Despite his earlier association with Bevan, in 1955 he backed Hugh Gaitskell, the right-wing candidate in internal Labour Party terms, against Bevan for the party leadership election. Gaitskell appointed him Shadow Chancellor of the Exchequer in 1955, and he proved to be very effective. One of his procedural moves caused a substantial delay to the progress of the Government's Finance Bill in 1955, and his speeches as Shadow Chancellor from 1956 were widely praised for their clarity and wit. He coined the term "Gnomes of Zurich" to ridicule Swiss bankers for selling Britain short and pushing the pound sterling down by speculation. He conducted an inquiry into the Labour Party's organisation following its defeat in the 1955 general election; its report compared Labour's organisation to an antiquated penny-farthing bicycle, and made various recommendations for improvements. Unusually, Wilson combined the job of Chairman of the House of Commons' Public Accounts Committee with that of Shadow Chancellor from 1959, holding that position until 1963.

Gaitskell's leadership was weakened following the Labour Party's 1959 defeat, his controversial attempt to ditch Labour's commitment to nationalisation by scrapping Clause IV, and his defeat at the 1960 Party Conference over a motion supporting unilateral nuclear disarmament. Bevan had died in July 1960, so Wilson established himself as a leader of the Labour left by launching an opportunistic but unsuccessful challenge to Gaitskell's leadership in November 1960. Wilson would later be moved to the position of Shadow Foreign Secretary in 1961, before he challenged for the deputy leadership in 1962 but was defeated by George Brown.

=== Opposition Leader, 1963–64 ===
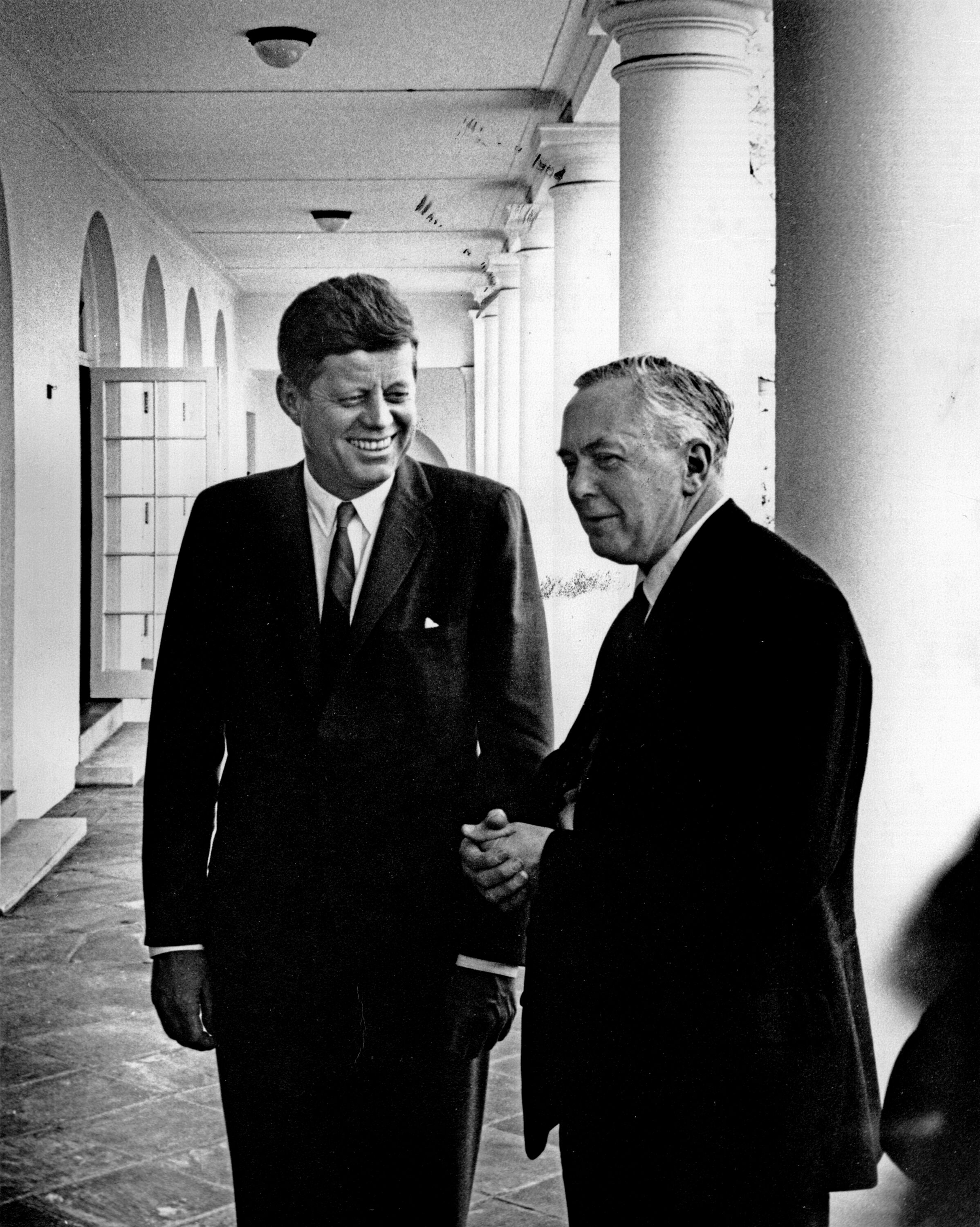
Wilson with US President John F. Kennedy in April 1963

Gaitskell died in January 1963, just as the Labour Party had begun to unite and appeared to have a very good chance of winning the next election, with the Macmillan Government running into trouble. Timothy Heppell has explored how Wilson won the Labour Party leadership election. Wilson had alienated the right wing of the party by his angry attempts to defeat Gaitskell in 1960 for the leadership, and George Brown in 1962 for the deputy leadership. These misadventures gave Wilson a reputation for disloyalty and divisiveness. Heppell identifies three factors whereby Wilson overcame these disadvantages. Firstly, he had united the party's left wing behind him and they showed no willingness to compromise. Secondly, the right wing, although more numerous, was deeply split between Brown and James Callaghan. Wilson took the lead on the first ballot and gained momentum on the second. Finally, Brown proved a poor campaigner, emphasizing divisive factors rather than his own credentials, allowing Wilson to emerge, surprisingly, as the unity candidate, thus becoming the Leader of the Labour Party and the Leader of the Opposition.

At the party's 1963 annual conference, Wilson made his best-remembered speech, on the implications of scientific and technological change. He argued that "the Britain that is going to be forged in the white heat of this revolution will be no place for restrictive practices or for outdated measures on either side of industry". This speech did much to set Wilson's reputation as a technocrat not tied to the prevailing class system.

Labour's 1964 election campaign was aided by the Profumo affair, a ministerial sex scandal that had mortally wounded Harold Macmillan and hurt the Conservatives. Wilson made capital without getting involved in the less salubrious aspects. (Asked for a statement on the scandal, he reportedly said "No comment ... in glorious Technicolor!"). Sir Alec Douglas-Home was an aristocrat who had given up his peerage to sit in the House of Commons and become prime minister upon Macmillan's resignation. To Wilson's comment that he was out of touch with ordinary people since he was the 14th Earl of Home, Home retorted, "I suppose Mr. Wilson is the fourteenth Mr. Wilson".

== First premiership (1964–1970) ==
=== Appointment ===
Labour won the 1964 general election with a narrow majority of four seats, and Wilson became prime minister, at 48 the youngest person to hold that office since Lord Rosebery 70 years earlier. During 1965, by-election losses reduced the government's majority to a single seat; but in March 1966 Wilson took the gamble of calling another general election. The gamble paid off, because this time Labour achieved a 96-seat majority over the Conservatives, who the previous year had made Edward Heath their leader.

=== Domestic affairs ===
The 1964–1970 Labour government carried out a broad range of reforms during its time in office, in such areas as social security, civil liberties, housing, health, education, and worker's rights.

==== Economic policies ====
Wilson's government put faith in economic planning as a way to solve Britain's economic problems. The government's strategy involved setting up a Department of Economic Affairs (DEA) which would draw up a National Plan which was intended to promote growth and investment. Wilson believed that scientific progress was the key to economic and social advancement, as such he famously referred to the "white heat of technology", in reference to the modernisation of British industry. This was to be achieved through a new Ministry of Technology (shortened to "Mintech") which would coordinate research and development and support the swift adoption of new technology by industry, aided by government-funded infrastructure improvements.

In practice, however, events derailed much of the initial optimism. Upon coming to power, the government was informed that they had inherited an exceptionally large deficit of £800 million on Britain's balance of trade. This partly reflected the preceding government's expansive fiscal policy in the run-up to the 1964 election. Immediately the pound came under enormous pressure, and many economists advocated devaluation of the pound in response, but Wilson resisted, reportedly in part out of concern that Labour, which had previously devalued sterling in 1949, would become tagged as "the party of devaluation". Wilson also believed that a devaluation would disproportionately harm low-income Britons with savings and poorer Commonwealth of Nations countries in the sterling area. The government instead opted to deal with the problem by imposing a temporary surcharge on imports, and a series of deflationary measures designed to reduce demand and therefore the inflow of imports. In the latter half of 1967, an attempt was made to prevent the recession in activity from going too far in the form of a stimulus to consumer durable spending through an easing of credit, which in turn prevented a rise in unemployment.

Following a costly battle, market pressures forced the government to devalue the pound by 14% from $2.80 to $2.40 in November 1967. Wilson was much criticised for a broadcast soon after in which he assured listeners that the "pound in your pocket" had not lost its value. Economic performance did show some improvement after the devaluation, as economists had predicted. The devaluation, with accompanying austerity measures which ensured resources went into exports rather than domestic consumption, successfully restored the trade balance to surplus by 1970. In retrospect Wilson has been widely criticised for not devaluing earlier, however, he believed there were strong arguments against it, including the fear that it would set off a round of competitive devaluations, and concern about the impact price rises following a devaluation would have on people on low incomes.

The government's decision over its first three years to defend sterling's parity with traditional deflationary measures ran counter to hopes for an expansionist push for growth. The National Plan produced by the DEA in 1965 targeted an annual growth rate of 3.8%, however, under the restrained circumstances the actual average rate of growth between 1964 and 1970 was a far more modest 2.2%. The DEA itself was wound up in 1969. The government's other main initiative Mintech did have some success at switching research and development spending from military to civilian purposes, and of achieving increases in industrial productivity, although persuading industry to adopt new technology proved more difficult than had been hoped.

The continued relevance of industrial nationalisation (a centrepiece of the post-War Labour government's programme) had been a key point of contention in Labour's internal struggles of the 1950s and early 1960s. Wilson's predecessor as leader, Hugh Gaitskell, had tried in 1960 to tackle the controversy head-on, with a proposal to expunge Clause Four (the public ownership clause) from the party's constitution, but had been forced to climb down. Wilson took a characteristically more subtle approach: No significant expansion of public ownership took place under Wilson's government, however, he placated the party's left-wing by renationalising the steel industry under the Iron and Steel Act 1967 (which had been denationalised by the Conservatives in the 1950s) creating the British Steel Corporation.

Wilson's government presided over a rate of unemployment which was low by historic (and later) standards but did rise during his period in office. Between 1964 and 1966 the average rate of unemployment was 1.6%, while between 1966 and 1970 the average stood at 2.5%. He had entered power at a time when unemployment stood at around 400,000. It still stood at 371,000 by early 1966 after a steady fall during 1965, but by March 1967 it stood at 631,000. It fell again towards the end of the decade, standing at 582,000 by the time of the general election in June 1970.

==== Social reforms ====
Wilson's government is perhaps best remembered for its progressive social reforms, notable amongst these was the Race Relations Act 1965 which was the first piece of legislation to address race relations and racial discrimination, the Murder (Abolition of Death Penalty) Act 1965 which abolished capital punishment (except for a small number of offences — notably high treason) the Sexual Offences Act 1967, which partially decriminalised male homosexuality and the Abortion Act 1967, which legalised abortion, the abolition of theatre censorship by the Theatres Act 1968, and the liberalisation of divorce law by the Divorce Reform Act 1969. While many of these measures were introduced as private member's bills, and given a free vote, the government effectively supported them by giving them parliamentary time, this was especially true during Roy Jenkins' tenure as Home Secretary (1965–1967), with whom the liberal reform agenda is particularly associated. Wilson personally, coming culturally from a provincial non-conformist background, showed no particular enthusiasm for much of this agenda.

==== Education ====
Higher education held special significance for a Labourite of Wilson's generation, given its role in both opening up opportunities for ambitious youth from working-class backgrounds and enabling Britain to seize the potential benefits of scientific advances. Under the first Wilson government, for the first time in British history, more money was allocated to education than to defence. Wilson continued the rapid creation of new universities, in line with the recommendations of the Robbins Report, a bipartisan policy already in train when Labour took power.

Wilson's government created the Open University, to give adults who had missed out on tertiary education a second chance through part-time study and distance learning. Due to his own attachment to higher education, Wilson himself was immensely proud of it, describing it as a 'brain-child' that he had been toying with since the early 1960s.

Wilson's record on secondary education was motivated by growing pressure for the abolition of the selective principle underlying the "eleven-plus", and replacement with comprehensive schools which would serve the full range of children (see the article 'grammar schools debate'). Comprehensive education became Labour Party policy. From 1966 to 1970, the proportion of children in comprehensive schools increased from about 10% to over 30%.

In 1968, Wilson's first government reluctantly decided it could not fulfil its long-held promise to raise the school leaving age to 16, because budget cuts left it unable to fulfil the investment required in infrastructure, such as tens of thousands of new classrooms and teachers.

Overall, public expenditure on education rose as a proportion of GNP from 4.8% in 1964 to 5.9% in 1968, and the number of teachers in training increased by more than a third between 1964 and 1967. The percentage of students staying on at school after the age of sixteen increased similarly, and the student population increased by over 10% each year. Pupil-teacher ratios were also steadily reduced. As a result of the first Wilson government's educational policies, opportunities for the working-class were improved; overall access to education in 1970 was broader than in 1964.

==== Housing ====
Housing was a major policy area under the first Wilson government. During Wilson's time in office from 1964 to 1970, more new houses were built than in the last six years of the previous Conservative government. The proportion of council housing rose from 42% to 50% of the total, while the number of council homes built increased steadily, from 119,000 in 1964 to 133,000 in 1965 and 142,000 in 1966. Allowing for demolitions, 1.3 million new homes were built between 1965 and 1970, although concerns were raised about the quality of much of the new housing, which was often cheaply built high-rise stock (the latter came in for particular criticism following the Ronan Point collapse in 1968).

To encourage homeownership, the government introduced the Option Mortgage Scheme (1968), which made low-income housebuyers eligible for subsidies (equivalent to tax relief on mortgage interest payments). This scheme had the effect of reducing housing costs for buyers on low incomes and enabling more people to become owner-occupiers. In addition, house owners were exempted from capital gains tax. Together with the Option Mortgage Scheme, this measure stimulated the private housing market. Wilson in a 1967 speech said: "..the grime and muddle and decay of our Victorian heritage is being replaced. The new city centres with their university precincts, their light, clean and well-spaced civic buildings, will not merely brighten the physical environment of our people, they will change the very quality of urban life in Britain."

Significant emphasis was also placed on town planning, with new conservation areas introduced and a new generation of new towns built, notably Milton Keynes. The New Towns Acts of 1965 and 1968 together gave the government the authority (through its ministries) to designate any area of land as a site for a new town.

==== Social Services and welfare ====
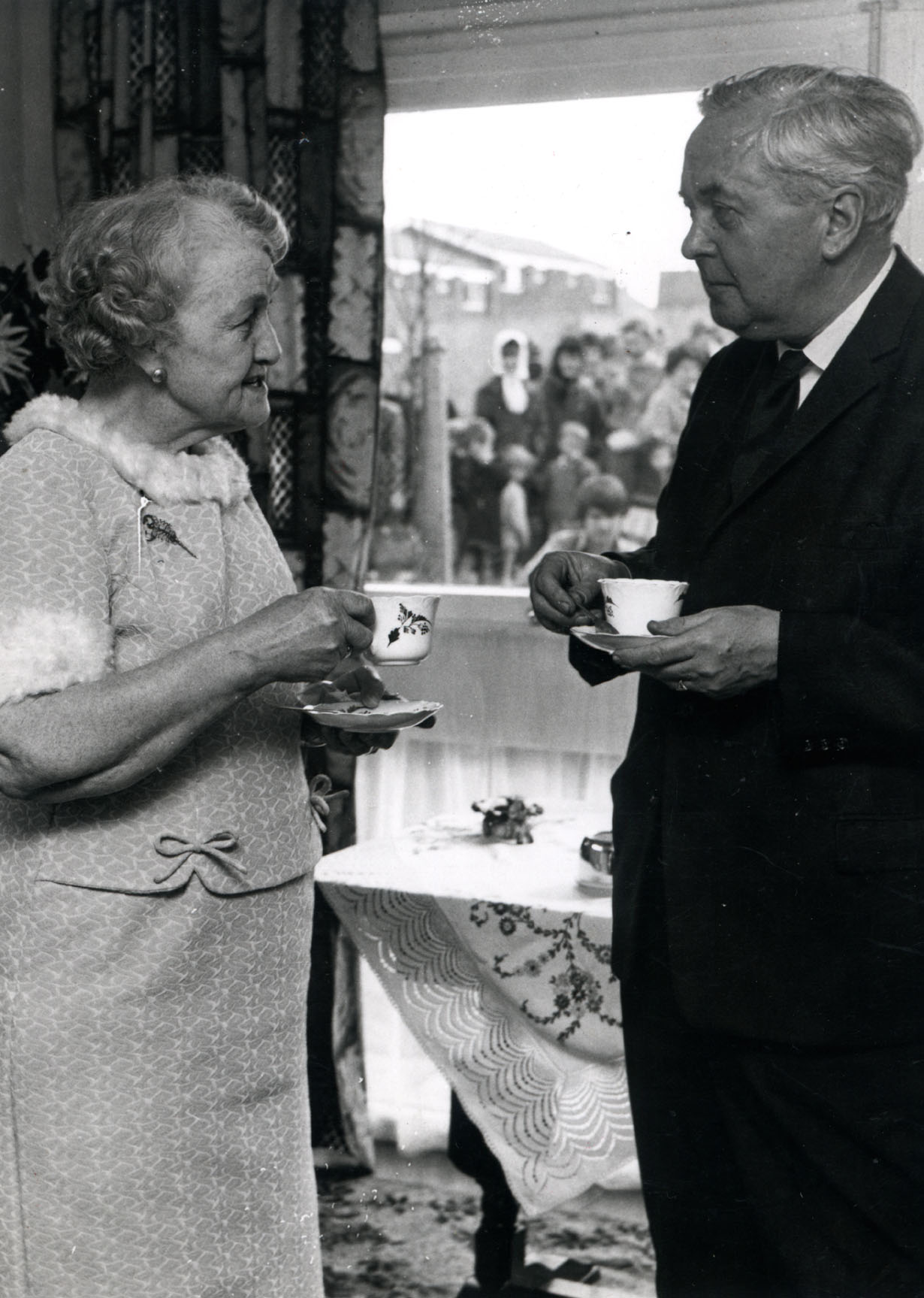
Wilson on a visit to a retirement home in Washington, County Durham

Wilson's government carried out a merger between the National Assistance Board and the Ministry of Pensions and National Insurance to create the Ministry of Social Security. Wilson's government carried out increases in a number of benefits; family allowances were more than doubled in money terms, whilst redundancy payments were introduced in 1965.

Prescription charges for medicines were abolished immediately following Labour's 1964 election victory, while pensions were raised to a record 21% of average male industrial wages. Before the 1966 election, the widow's pension was tripled. Due to austerity measures following an economic crisis, prescription charges were re-introduced in 1968 as an alternative to cutting the hospital building programme, although those sections of the population who were most in need (including supplementary benefit claimants, the long-term sick, children, and pensioners) were exempted from charges.

In the five years from 1964 up until the last increases made by the First Wilson Government, pensions went up by 23% in real terms, supplementary benefits by 26% in real terms, and sickness and unemployment benefits by 153% in real terms (largely as a result of the introduction of earnings-related benefits in 1967).

==== Northern Ireland ====
Wilson's first premiership was marked by the emerging conflict in Northern Ireland: like all British governments since the partition of Ireland in 1921, Harold Wilson's Labour government preferred not to intervene in the affairs of Northern Ireland. However in August 1969, escalating sectarian violence between the Northern Ireland's unionist (largely Protestant) and nationalist (largely Catholic) communities, and involving members of the police force of Northern Ireland, gave the Government of Northern Ireland, led by Prime Minister of Northern Ireland Terence O'Neill, little choice but to ask the British government to intervene directly and send troops. It was Wilson's Home Secretary, James Callaghan, who took the decision to deploy British Army troops to Northern Ireland. In return Wilson and Callaghan demanded that various reforms be implemented in Northern Ireland, such as the phasing out of the Protestant paramilitary, the B-Specials. Their replacement by the Ulster Defence Regiment. Wilson passed reforms to reduce discrimination against Catholics in secular life, including expanding the voting franchise to all citizens in Northern Ireland rather than those (largely unionist) who owned property, and reformed local government boundaries to reduce gerrymandering. Although the troops were initially welcomed by the Catholic community, they quickly lost support, and the Provisional IRA emerged, in what became a decades long conflict known as The Troubles.

==== International development ====
A new Ministry of Overseas Development was established, with its greatest success at the time being the introduction of interest-free loans for the poorest countries. The Minister of Overseas Development, Barbara Castle, set a standard in interest relief on loans to developing nations which resulted in changes to the loan policies of many donor countries, "a significant shift in the conduct of rich white nations to poor brown ones." Loans were introduced to developing countries on terms that were more favourable to them than those given by governments of all other developed countries at that time. In addition, Castle was instrumental in setting up an Institute of Development Studies at the University of Sussex to devise ways of tackling global socio-economic inequalities. Overseas aid suffered from the austerity measures introduced by the first Wilson government in its last few years in office, with British aid as a percentage of GNP falling from 0.53% in 1964 to 0.39% in 1969.

==== Taxation ====
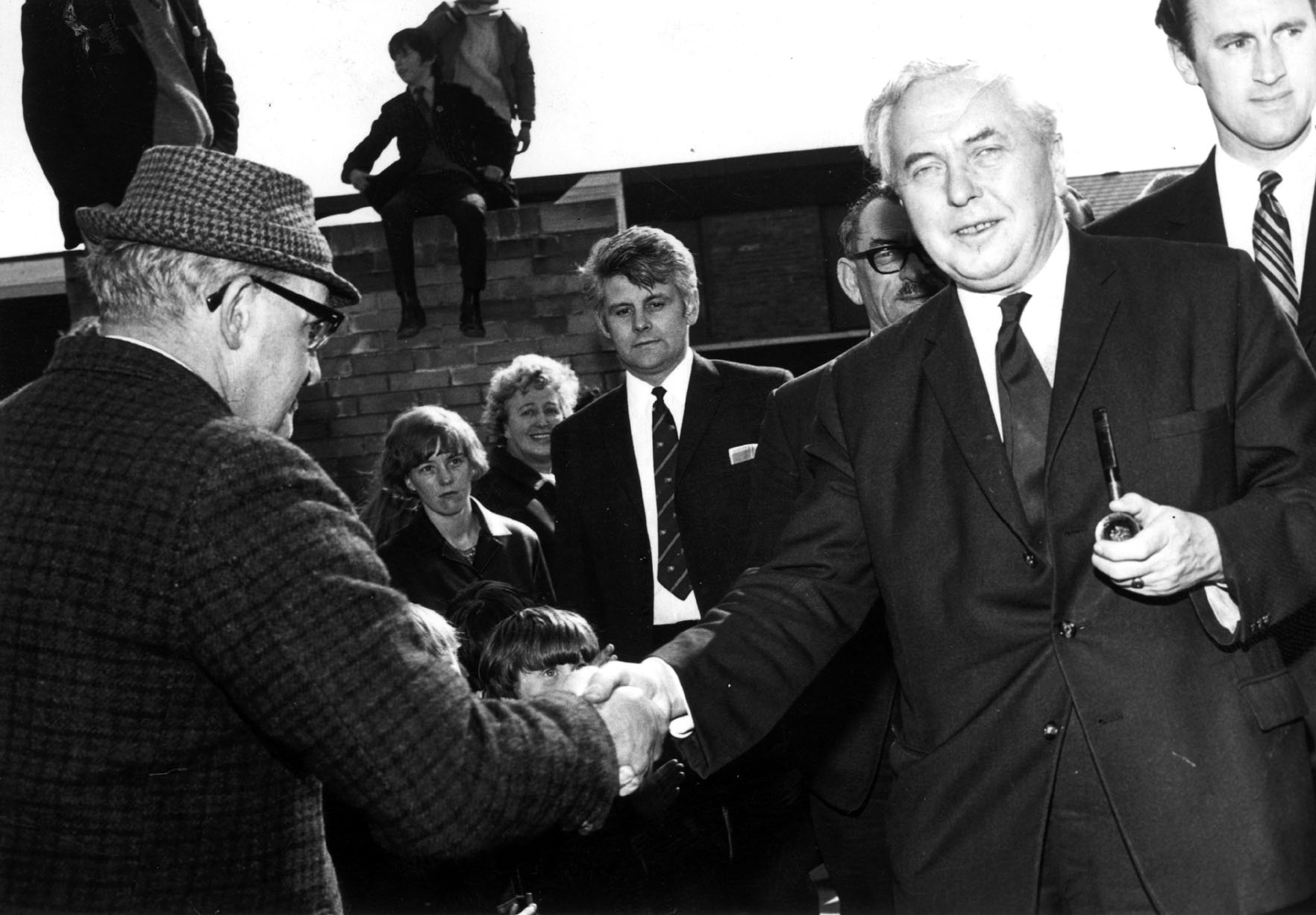
Wilson meeting the public in the late-1960s

Wilson's government made a variety of changes to the tax system. Largely under the influence of the Hungarian-born economists Nicholas Kaldor and Thomas Balogh, an idiosyncratic Selective Employment Tax (SET) was introduced that was designed to tax employment in the service sectors while subsidising employment in manufacturing. (The rationale proposed by its economist authors derived largely from claims about potential economies of scale and technological progress, but Wilson in his memoirs stressed the tax's revenue-raising potential.) The SET did not long survive the return of a Conservative government. Of longer-term significance, capital gains tax (CGT) was introduced across the UK on 6 April 1965.

Various changes were also made to the tax system which benefited workers on low and middle incomes. Married couples with low incomes benefited from the increases in the single personal allowance and marriage allowance. In 1965, the regressive allowance for national insurance contributions was abolished and the single personal allowance, marriage allowance and wife's earned income relief were increased. These allowances were further increased in the tax years 1969–70 and 1970–71. Increases in the age exemption and dependant relative's income limits benefited the low-income elderly. In 1967, new tax concessions were introduced for widows.

Increases were made in some of the minor allowances in the 1969 Finance Act, notably the additional personal allowance, the age exemption and age relief and the dependent relative limit. Apart from the age relief, further adjustments in these concessions were implemented in 1970.

1968 saw the introduction of aggregation of the investment income of unmarried minors with the income of their parents. According to Michael Meacher, this change put an end to a previous inequity whereby two families, in otherwise identical circumstances, paid differing amounts of tax "simply because in one case the child possessed property transferred to it by a grandparent, while in the other case the grandparent's identical property was inherited by the parent."

In the 1969 budget, income tax was abolished for about 1 million of the lowest-paid and reduced for a further 600,000 people, while in the government's last budget (introduced in 1970), two million small taxpayers were exempted from paying any income tax altogether.

==== Industrial relations ====
Wilson made periodic attempts to mitigate inflation, largely through wage-price controls—better known in Britain as "prices and incomes policy". (As with indicative planning, such controls—though now generally out of favour—were widely adopted at that time by governments of different ideological complexions, including the Nixon administration in the United States.) Partly as a result of this reliance, the government tended to find itself repeatedly injected into major industrial disputes, with late-night "beer and sandwiches at Number Ten" an almost routine culmination to such episodes. Among the most damaging of the numerous strikes during Wilson's periods in office was a six-week stoppage by the National Union of Seamen, beginning shortly after Wilson's re-election in 1966, and conducted, he claimed, by "politically motivated men".

With public frustration over strikes mounting, Wilson's government in 1969 proposed a series of changes to the legal basis for industrial relations (labour law), which were outlined in a White Paper "In Place of Strife" put forward by the Employment Secretary Barbara Castle. Following a confrontation with the Trades Union Congress, which strongly opposed the proposals, and internal dissent from Home Secretary James Callaghan, the government substantially backed-down from its intentions. The Heath government (1970–1974) introduced the Industrial Relations Act 1971 with many of the same ideas, but this was largely repealed by the post-1974 Labour government. Some elements of these changes were subsequently to be enacted (in modified form) during the premiership of Margaret Thatcher.

=== Foreign affairs ===
==== United States ====
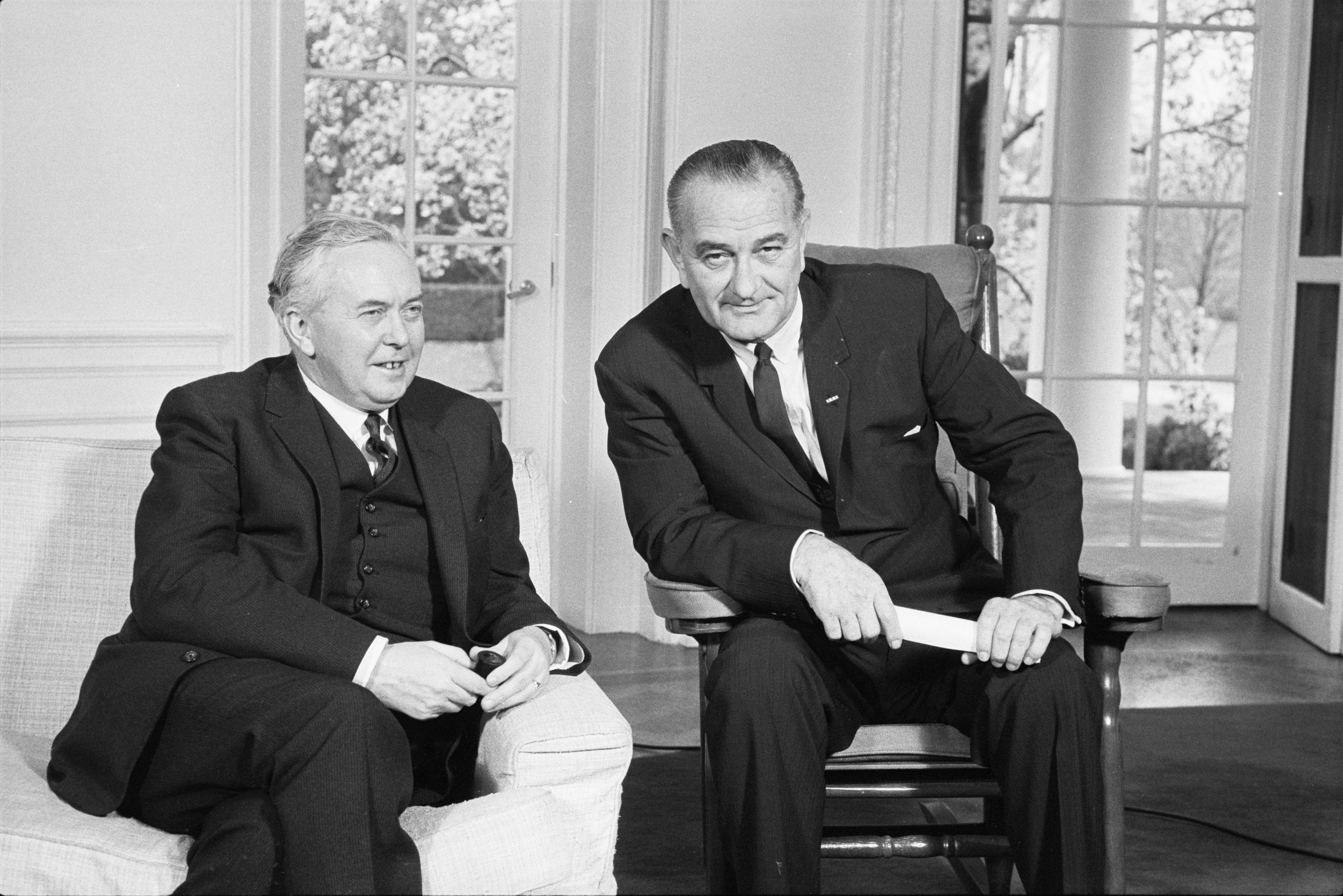
Wilson with US President Lyndon B. Johnson at the White House in 1965

Wilson believed in a strong "Special Relationship" with the United States and wanted to highlight his dealings with the White House to strengthen his prestige as a statesman. President Lyndon B. Johnson disliked Wilson and ignored any "special" relationship. The Vietnam War was a sore point. Johnson needed and asked for help to maintain American prestige. Wilson offered lukewarm verbal support and no military aid. Wilson's policy angered the left wing of his Labour Party, who opposed the Vietnam War. Wilson and Johnson also differed sharply on British economic weakness and its declining status as a world power. Historian Jonathan Colman concludes it made for the most unsatisfactory "special" relationship in the 20th century. The only point of total agreement was that both Johnson and Wilson emphatically supported Israel in the 1967 Six-Day War.

==== Europe ====
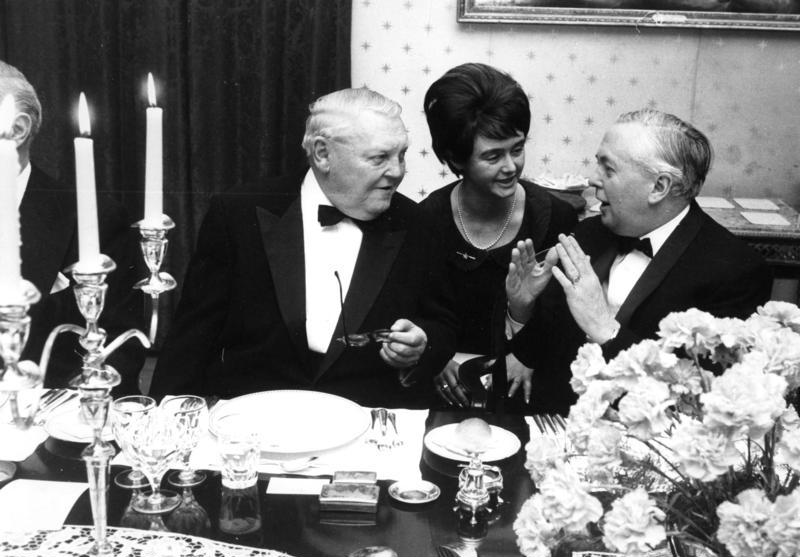
Wilson with West German Chancellor Ludwig Erhard in 1965

Among the more challenging political dilemmas Wilson faced was the issue of British membership of the European Economic Community, the forerunner of the present European Union. An entry attempt was vetoed in 1963 by French President Charles de Gaulle. The Labour Party in Opposition had been divided on the issue, with Hugh Gaitskell having come out in 1962 in opposition to Britain joining the European Economic Community. After initial hesitation, Wilson's Government in May 1967 lodged the UK's second application to join the European Economic Community. It was vetoed by de Gaulle in November 1967. After De Gaulle lost power, Conservative prime minister Edward Heath negotiated Britain's admission to the EEC in 1973.

Wilson in opposition showed political ingenuity in devising a position that both sides of the party could agree on, opposing the terms negotiated by Heath but not membership in principle. Labour's 1974 manifesto included a pledge to renegotiate terms for Britain's membership and then hold a referendum on whether to stay in the EEC on the new terms. This was a constitutional procedure without precedent in British history.

Following Wilson's return to power, the renegotiations with Britain's fellow EC members were carried out by Wilson himself in tandem with Foreign Secretary James Callaghan, and they toured the capital cities of Europe meeting their European counterparts. The discussions focused primarily on Britain's net budgetary contribution to the EEC. As a small agricultural producer heavily dependent on imports, Britain suffered doubly from the dominance of:

(i) agricultural spending in the EEC budget,
(ii) agricultural import taxes as a source of EEC revenues.

During the renegotiations, other EEC members conceded, as a partial offset, the establishment of a significant European Regional Development Fund (ERDF), from which it was agreed that Britain would be a major net beneficiary.

In the subsequent referendum campaign, rather than the normal British tradition of "collective responsibility", under which the government takes a policy position which all cabinet members are required to support publicly, members of the Government were free to present their views on either side of the question. The electorate voted on 5 June 1975 to continue membership, by a substantial majority.

==== Asia ====
American military involvement in Vietnam escalated continuously from 1964 to 1968 and President Lyndon B. Johnson brought pressure to bear for at least a token involvement of British military units. Wilson consistently avoided any commitment of British forces, giving as reasons British military commitments to the Malayan Emergency and British co-chairmanship of the 1954 Geneva Conference.

His government offered some rhetorical support for the US position (most prominently in the defence offered by the Foreign Secretary Michael Stewart in a much-publicised "teach-in" or debate on Vietnam). On at least one occasion the British government made an unsuccessful effort to mediate in the conflict, with Wilson discussing peace proposals with Alexei Kosygin, the Chairman of the USSR Council of Ministers. On 28 June 1966 Wilson 'dissociated' his Government from American bombing of the cities of Hanoi and Haiphong. In his memoirs, Wilson writes of "selling LBJ a bum steer", a reference to Johnson's Texas roots, which conjured up images of cattle and cowboys in British minds.

Part of the price paid by Wilson after talks with President Johnson in June 1967 for US assistance with the UK economy was his agreement to maintain a military presence East of Suez. In July 1967 Defence Secretary Denis Healey announced that Britain would abandon her mainland bases East of Suez by 1977, although airmobile forces would be retained which could if necessary be deployed in the region. Shortly afterwards, in January 1968, Wilson announced that the proposed timetable for this withdrawal was to be accelerated and that British forces were to be withdrawn from Singapore, Malaysia, and the Persian Gulf by the end of 1971.

Wilson was known for his strongly pro-Israel views. He was a particular friend of Israeli Premier Golda Meir, though her tenure largely coincided with Wilson's 1970–1974 hiatus. Another associate was West German Chancellor Willy Brandt; all three were members of the Socialist International.

==== Africa ====
The British "retreat from Empire" had made headway by 1964 and was to continue during Wilson's administration. Southern Rhodesia was not granted independence, principally because Wilson refused to grant independence to the white minority government headed by Rhodesian prime minister Ian Smith which was not willing to extend unqualified voting rights to the native African population. Smith's defiant response was a Unilateral Declaration of Independence, on 11 November 1965. Wilson's immediate recourse was to the United Nations, and in 1965, the Security Council imposed sanctions, which were to last until official independence in 1979. This involved British warships blockading the port of Beira to try to cause economic collapse in Rhodesia.

Wilson was applauded by most nations for taking a firm stand on the issue (and none extended diplomatic recognition to the Smith régime). A number of nations did not join in with sanctions, undermining their efficiency. Certain sections of public opinion started to question their efficacy, and to demand the toppling of the régime by force. Wilson declined to intervene in Rhodesia with military force, believing the British population would not support such action against their "kith and kin". The two leaders met for discussions aboard British warships, Tiger in 1966 and Fearless in 1968. Smith would later attack Wilson in his memoirs, accusing him of delaying tactics during negotiations and alleging duplicity; Wilson responded in kind, questioning Smith's good faith and suggesting that Smith had moved the goal-posts whenever a settlement appeared in sight. The matter was still unresolved at the time of Wilson's resignation in 1976.

Wilson had a good relationship with Siaka Stevens of Sierra Leone; the two leaders attempted to work together to find a solution to the question of Biafra in Nigeria. But despite this, the British government was actively sending arms, munitions and other equipment to the Nigerian military junta, and consistently denied any wrongdoing by the government of Nigeria: Nigerian writer Chinua Achebe wrote that this may have cost him his position.

=== Electoral defeat and resignation ===
By 1969, the Labour Party was suffering serious electoral reverses, and by the turn of 1970 had lost a total of 16 seats in by-elections since the previous general election.

By 1970, the economy was showing signs of improvement, and by May that year, Labour had overtaken the Conservatives in the opinion polls. Wilson responded to this apparent recovery in his government's popularity by calling a general election, but, to the surprise of most observers, was defeated at the polls by the Conservatives under Heath. Most opinion polls had predicted a Labour win, with a poll six days before the election showing a 12.4% Labour lead. Writing in the aftermath of the election, The Times journalist George Clark wrote that the 1970 contest would be "remembered as the occasion when the people of the United Kingdom hurled the findings of the opinion polls back into the faces of the pollsters and at the voting booths proved them wrong—most of them badly wrong". Heath and the Conservatives had attacked Wilson over the economy. Towards the end of the campaign, bad trade figures for May added weight to Heath's campaign and he claimed that a Labour victory would result in a further devaluation. Wilson considered Heath's claims "irresponsible" and "damaging to the nation". Ultimately, however, the election saw Labour's vote share fall to its lowest since 1935. Several prominent Labour figures lost their seats, notably George Brown who was still Deputy Leader of the Labour Party.

== Return to opposition (1970–1974) ==
Following the elections and Labour's subsequent defeat, Wilson survived as leader of the Labour Party in opposition. In August 1973, holidaying on the Isles of Scilly, he tried to board a motorboat from a dinghy and stepped into the sea. He was unable to get into the boat and was left in the cold water for more than half an hour, hanging on to the fenders of the motorboat. He was close to death before he was saved by Paul Wolff, the father of novelist Isabel Wolff. When word of the incident became public the following month, Wilson downplayed its severity; it was taken up by the press and resulted in some embarrassment. His press secretary, Joe Haines, tried to deflect some of the comment by blaming Wilson's dog Paddy for the problem.

While out of office in late 1971, Wilson had formulated a 16-point, 15-year programme that was designed to pave the way for the unification of Ireland. The proposal was not adopted by the then Heath government.

Early in 1974, Wilson became the victim of a personation fraud. A Staffordshire property developer, Ronald Milhench, forged a letter purporting to be from the former Prime Minister. Milhench was involved in negotiations for a property deal; unable to provide finance, he met a journalist, claiming that Wilson was involved with the deal. Milhench further claimed he wanted to deal "a body blow" to Labour's election chances and that he could sell the letter for £25000. In November 1974, Milhench was convicted of forgery, theft and firearms charges.

Economic conditions during the 1970s were becoming more difficult for Britain and many other western economies as a result of the Nixon shock and the 1973 oil crisis, and the Heath government in its turn was buffeted by economic adversity and industrial unrest (notably including confrontation with the coalminers which led to the Three-Day Week) towards the end of 1973, and on 7 February 1974 (with the crisis still ongoing) Heath called a snap election for 28 February.

== Second premiership (1974–1976) ==
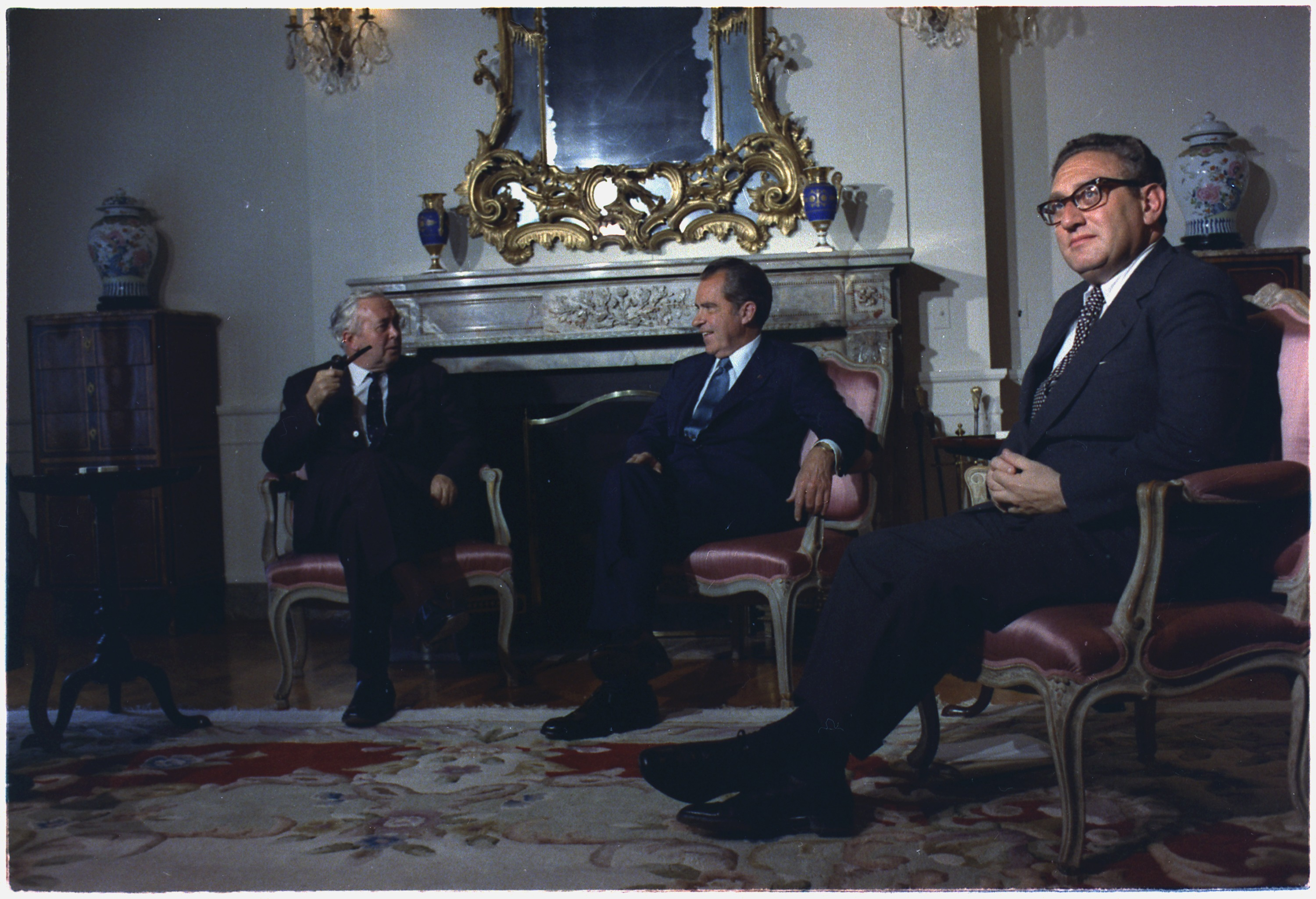
Harold Wilson with US President Richard Nixon and Henry Kissinger in 1974

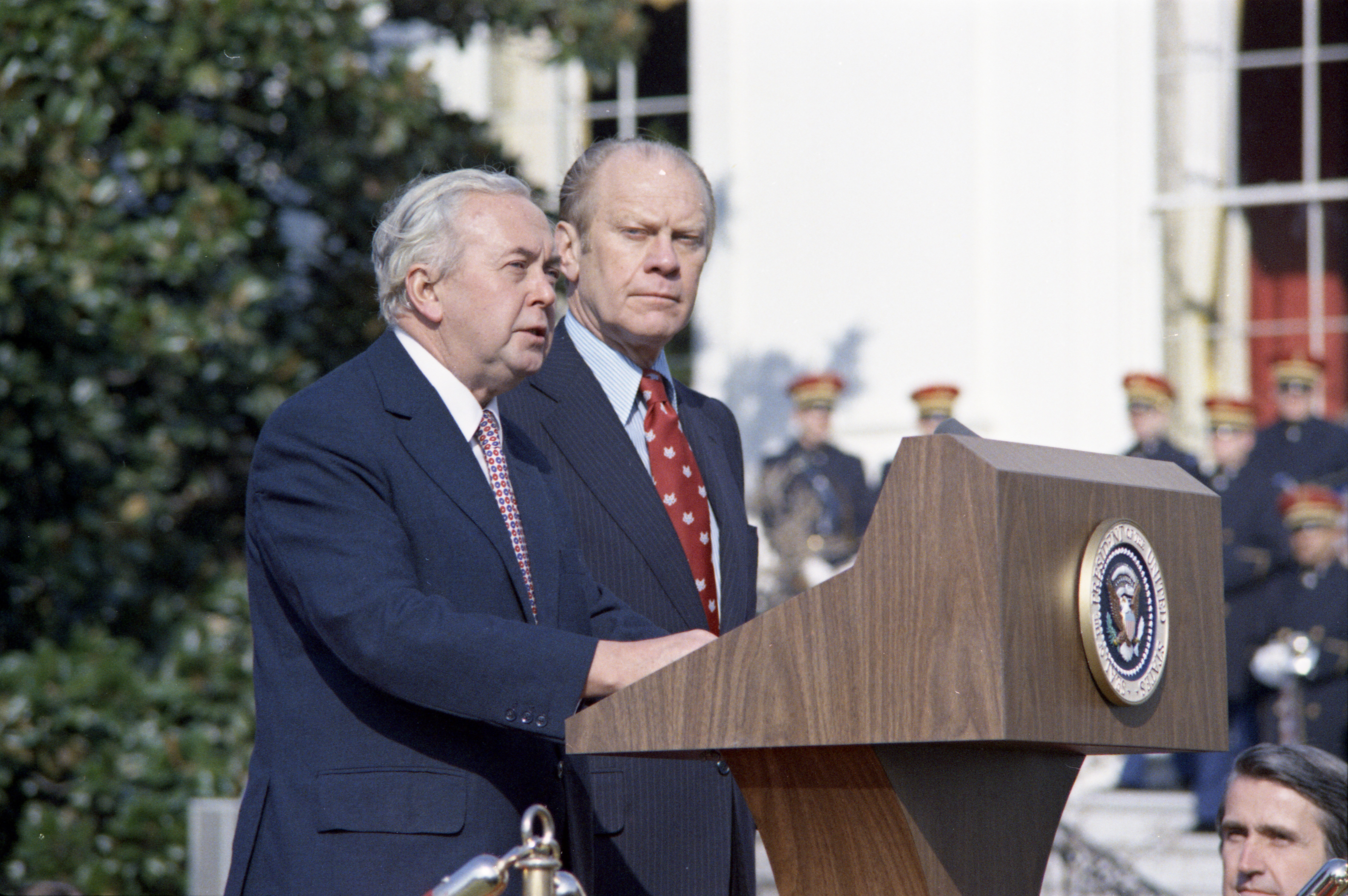
Harold Wilson with US President Gerald Ford in 1975, during his second term as prime minister

Labour won more seats (though fewer votes) than the Conservative Party in the general election in February 1974, which resulted in a hung parliament. As Heath was unable to persuade the Liberals to form a coalition, Wilson returned to 10 Downing Street on 4 March 1974 as prime minister of a minority Labour Government. He gained a three-seat majority in another election later that year, on 10 October 1974.

=== 1975 European referendum ===
One of the key issues addressed during his second period in office was the referendum on British membership of the European Community (EC) which took place in June 1975: Labour had pledged in its February 1974 manifesto to renegotiate the terms of British accession to the EC, and then to consult the public in a referendum on whether Britain should stay in on the new terms. Although the government recommended a vote in favour of continued membership, the cabinet was split on the issue, and Ministers were allowed to campaign on different sides of the question. The referendum resulted in a near two-to-one majority in favour of Britain remaining in the EC.

=== Social affairs ===
The Second Wilson Government made a major commitment to the expansion of the British welfare state, with increased spending on education, health, and housing rents. To pay for it, it imposed controls and raised taxes on the rich. Wilson's new chancellor Denis Healey partially reversed the 1971 reduction in the top rate of tax from 90% to 75%, increasing it to 83% in his first budget, which came into law in April 1974. This applied to incomes over £20,000 (equivalent to £189,615 in 2025), and combined with a 15% surcharge on 'unearned' income (investments and dividends) could add up to a 98% marginal rate of personal income tax. In 1974, as many as 750,000 people were liable to pay the top rate of income tax.

Circular 4/74 (1974) renewed pressure for moves towards comprehensive education (progress of which had stalled under the Heath ministry), while the industrial relations legislation passed under Edward Heath was repealed. The Health and Safety at Work etc. Act 1974 set up a Health and Safety Commission and a Health and Safety Executive; it gave a legal framework for health and safety at work, while the Child Benefits Act 1975 introduced an extra payment for single parents. In June 1975, the government issued the first series of National Savings Retirement Certificates.

The Social Security Act 1975 introduced a maternity allowance fund, while the Sex Discrimination Act 1975 set up an Equal Opportunities Commission and outlawed gender discrimination (both indirect and direct), with women given the right in principle to equal access to jobs and equal treatment at work with men.

However, despite the socially progressive advances made by Wilson's government, the number of unemployed Britons continued to rise, passing one million in April 1975.

=== Economic affairs ===
Wilson's second government came into office at a troubled time for the British economy, due to a global recession and stagflation, caused in large part by the 1973 oil crisis and the preceding government's inflationary attempt to boost growth. In order to deal with inflation (which peaked at 26% in 1975) the government negotiated a 'social contract' with the Trades Union Congress to implement a voluntary incomes policy, in which pay rises were held down to limits set by the government. This policy operated with reasonable success for the next few years, and inflation fell to single figures by 1978. By 1976 the recession had ended and economic recovery began, by 1978/79 living standards recovered to the level they had been in 1973/74. The Labour governments of the 1970s did, however, manage to protect the living standards of many people from the worst effects of the recession and high inflation, with pensions increasing by 20% in real terms between 1974 and 1979, while measures such as rent and price controls and food and transport subsidies mitigated the adverse impact on the living standards of many more people.

The government's industrial policy was greatly influenced by the economist Stuart Holland and the Secretary of State for Industry Tony Benn. The centrepiece of the policy was the National Enterprise Board (NEB) which was established in 1975 and was intended to channel public investment into industry, in return for taking a holding of equity in private companies. The NEB was intended to extend public ownership of the economy as well as investing in the regeneration of industry, although it had some successes in that aim, in practice one of its main activities became that of propping up failing companies such as British Leyland. The government also continued its policy of encouraging regional development by increasing Regional Employment Premiums, which had first been established in 1967.

=== Northern Ireland ===
Upon returning to office in 1974, Wilson found that the situation had rapidly deteriorated, with the Unionist Ulster Worker's Council calling for the Protestant workforce to go on strike, essentially bringing the whole of Northern Ireland to a halt. Wilson condemned the strikes, describing them as "sectarian" - in a televised speech later, he referred to the loyalist strikers and their supporters as "spongers" who expected British taxpayers on the mainland to pay for their lifestyles. He refused to pressure a reluctant British Army to face down the Ulster loyalist paramilitaries who were intimidating utility workers. The strike was eventually successful in breaking the power-sharing Northern Ireland executive.

In May 1975, his government set up the Northern Ireland Constitutional Convention as an attempt to deal with constitutional issues surrounding the status of Northern Ireland. The body, as established in the Northern Ireland Act 1974, was elected; the Act dissolved the Northern Ireland Assembly. The Constitutional Convention ultimately failed to achieve cross-community consensus on new constitutional arrangements, before it was permanently dissolved in 1976. The Northern Ireland Assembly was only re-established in 1982.

On 11 September 2008, BBC Radio 4's Document programme claimed to have unearthed a secret plan—codenamed Doomsday—which proposed to turn Northern Ireland into an independent dominion. Document went on to claim that the Doomsday plan was devised mainly by Wilson and was kept a closely guarded secret. The plan then allegedly lost momentum, due in part, it was claimed, to warnings made by the Foreign Secretary, James Callaghan, and the Irish Minister for Foreign Affairs Garret FitzGerald who admitted the 12,000-strong Irish Army would be unable to deal with a civil war. Later, Callaghan spoke and wrote despondently about the prospect for a British-derived solution to the Northern Ireland issue, supporting a similar plan to push Northern Ireland towards independent status.

In 1975, Wilson secretly offered Libya's dictator Muammar Gaddafi £14 million to stop arming the Provisional Irish Republican Army, but Gaddafi demanded a far greater sum of money. This offer did not become publicly known until 2009.

=== Resignation ===
When Wilson entered office for the second time, he had privately admitted that he had lost his enthusiasm for the role, telling a close adviser in 1974 that "I have been around this racetrack so often that I cannot generate any more enthusiasm for jumping any more hurdles." On 16 March 1976, Wilson resigned as prime minister, taking effect on 5 April. He claimed that he had always planned on resigning at the age of 60 and that he was physically and mentally exhausted. As early as the late 1960s he had been telling intimates, like his doctor Sir Joseph Stone (later Lord Stone of Hendon), that he did not intend to serve more than eight or nine years as prime minister.

Roy Jenkins has suggested that Wilson may have been motivated partly by the distaste for politics felt by his loyal and long-suffering wife, Mary. His doctor had detected problems which would later be diagnosed as colon cancer, and Wilson had begun drinking brandy during the day to cope with stress. By 1976 he might already have been aware of the first stages of early-onset Alzheimer's disease, which was to cause his formerly excellent memory and his powers of concentration to fail dramatically.

Wilson's Resignation Honours included many businessmen and celebrities, along with his political supporters. His choice of appointments caused lasting damage to his reputation, worsened by the suggestion that the first draft of the list had been written by his political secretary Marcia Williams on lavender notepaper (it became known as the "Lavender List"). Roy Jenkins noted that Wilson's retirement "was disfigured by his, at best, eccentric resignation honours list, which gave peerages or knighthoods to some adventurous business gentlemen, several of whom were close neither to him nor to the Labour Party." Some of those whom Wilson honoured included Lord Kagan, the inventor of Gannex (Wilson's preferred raincoat), who was eventually imprisoned for fraud, and Sir Eric Miller, who later committed suicide while under police investigation for corruption.

The Labour Party held an election to replace Wilson as leader of the Party, and thus prime minister. Six candidates stood in the first ballot; in order of votes they were: Michael Foot, James Callaghan, Roy Jenkins, Tony Benn, Denis Healey and Anthony Crosland. In the third ballot, on 5 April, Callaghan defeated Foot in a parliamentary vote of 176 to 137, and served as prime minister until May 1979.

As Wilson wished to remain an MP after leaving office, he was not immediately given the peerage customarily offered to retired prime ministers, but instead was created a Knight Companion of the Garter in 1976. He fought one last election in 1979 in which he was returned as a backbench MP for Huyton. Following his departure from the House of Commons before the 1983 general election, after 38 years of service, he was granted a life peerage as Baron Wilson of Rievaulx, of Kirklees in the County of West Yorkshire, after Rievaulx Abbey, in the north of his native Yorkshire; the Kirklees refers to his home address of Huddersfield, and is not part of his title.

== Post-premiership (1976–1995) ==
=== Retirement ===
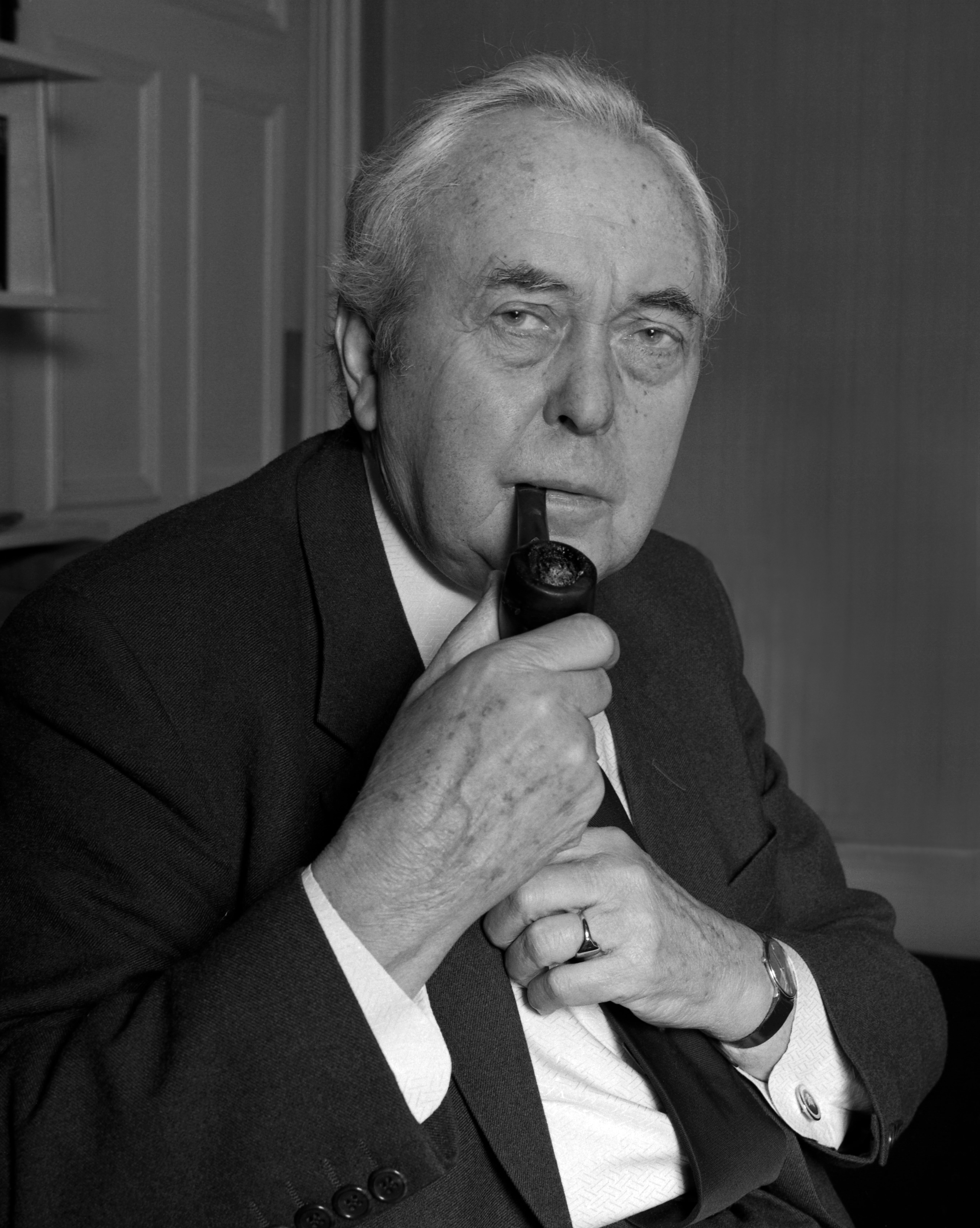
Wilson in 1986

He was appointed in 1976 to chair the Committee to Review the Functioning of Financial Institutions (the Wilson Committee) which reported in June 1980.

Shortly after resigning as prime minister, Wilson was signed by David Frost to host a series of interview/chat show programmes. The pilot episode proved to be a flop as Wilson appeared uncomfortable with the informality of the format. Wilson also hosted two editions of the BBC chat show Friday Night, Saturday Morning. He famously floundered in the role, and in 2000, Channel 4 chose one of his appearances as one of the "100 Moments of TV Hell".

A lifelong Gilbert and Sullivan fan, in 1975, Wilson joined the Board of Trustees of the D'Oyly Carte Trust at the invitation of Sir Hugh Wontner, who was then the Lord Mayor of London. At Christmas 1978, Wilson appeared on the Morecambe and Wise Christmas Special. Eric Morecambe's habit of appearing not to recognise the guest stars was repaid by Wilson, who referred to him throughout as 'Morry-camby' (the mispronunciation of Morecambe's name made by Ed Sullivan when the pair appeared on his famous American television show). Wilson appeared on the show again in 1980.

Wilson was not especially active in the House of Lords, although he did initiate a debate on unemployment in May 1984. His last speech was in a debate on marine pilotage in 1986, when he commented as an elder brother of Trinity House. In the same year he played himself as prime minister in an Anglia Television drama, Inside Story.

Wilson suffered from advancing Alzheimer's-related dementia in his retirement years, making it difficult for him to earn an income capitalising on his experience as a former prime minister by writing books and giving speeches. According to his former press secretary Joe Haines: "He never had much money of his own. Because of his mental condition he couldn't write articles or make speeches, and his income would have been his pension as an ex-prime minister," which Haines said was a "comparatively small sum" as Conservative and Liberal former prime ministers were usually aristocrats who had their own wealth or would benefit from wealthy benefactors and by being appointed to corporate boards, and thus did not need to rely on their parliamentary pensions to support themselves. One of Wilson's successors as Labour leader, Neil Kinnock, told The Guardian: "I heard stories that he was trying to make speeches for money but was unsuccessful because he had lost his fluency." Eventually, Wilson attempted to sell his personal papers to McMaster University in Canada for £212,500 in order to fund costs of his health care. This arrangement was considered unsuitable by the government and instead, it was arranged in 1991 that anonymous donors would provide funds so that the Bodleian Library at Oxford could buy Wilson's papers in order to keep them in the United Kingdom while also allowing the proceeds to set up a trust fund for Wilson and his wife.

=== Death ===
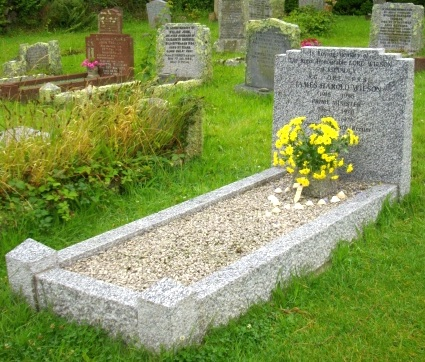
Wilson's grave in St Mary's, Isles of Scilly

Wilson continued regularly attending the House of Lords until just over a year before his death; the last sitting he attended was on 27 April 1994. He had a picture taken with other Labour Lords on 15 June 1994, just under a year before his death. He died of colon cancer and Alzheimer's disease on 23 May 1995, aged 79.

Many in the House of Commons made tributes. Prime Minister John Major called him a "formidable political opponent" and ended his speech with the following words: "What was Harold Wilson really like? I have formed my judgment. He was a complex man, certainly, a clever man, a sensitive man, a man who could be bruised and hurt and who never wore the armadillo skin of the fictional politician. He was a man of many achievements and, perhaps above all, a very human man who served his country well and honourably and who has earned, by that, a secure place in its history. In the ledger of life, his credit balance is very high. It is a privilege for me, as one, nominally, of his political opponents, to pay him this tribute and I do so unreservedly."

Wilson's memorial service was held in Westminster Abbey on 13 July 1995. It was attended by Charles, Prince of Wales, the former prime ministers Edward Heath, James Callaghan and Margaret Thatcher, the incumbent prime minister John Major, and Tony Blair, then Leader of the Opposition and later prime minister. Wilson was buried at St Mary's Old Church, St Mary's, Isles of Scilly, on 6 June. His epitaph is Tempus Imperator Rerum (Time the Commander of Things).

== Personal life ==
On New Year's Day 1940, in the chapel of Mansfield College, Oxford, he married Mary Baldwin, to whom he remained married until his death. Mary Wilson became a published poet, and outlived her husband by 23 years. She died on 6 June 2018 at the age of 102. They had two sons, Robin and Giles (named after Giles Alington); Robin became a professor of mathematics, and Giles became a teacher and later a train driver. In their twenties, his sons were under a kidnap threat from the IRA because of their father's prominence.

In April 2024 Joe Haines, who had served as Wilson's press secretary during his time as prime minister, revealed that Wilson had had an affair with Haines' deputy Janet Hewlett-Davies during his final two years in office. Hewlett-Davies died aged 85 in October 2023. Speaking on BBC Radio 4's Today programme, Wilson's former adviser Bernard Donoughue said the affair had provided "a little sunshine at sunset" for Wilson, who was becoming "increasingly paranoid about the security services", was dealing with political difficulties, and was possibly in the early stages of dementia.

== Legacy ==
=== Political style ===
Wilson regarded himself as a "man of the people" and did much to promote this image, contrasting himself with the stereotypical aristocratic conservatives and other statesmen who had preceded him, as an example of social mobility. He largely retained his Yorkshire accent. Other features of this persona included his working man's Gannex raincoat, his pipe (the British Pipesmokers' Council voted him Pipe Smoker of the Year in 1965 and Pipeman of the Decade in 1976, though in private he preferred cigars), his love of simple cooking and fondness for the popular British relish HP Sauce, and his support for his home town's football team, Huddersfield Town. His first general election victory relied heavily on associating these down-to-earth attributes with a sense that the UK urgently needed to modernise after "thirteen years of Tory mis-rule".

Wilson exhibited his populist touch in June 1965 when he had the Beatles honoured with the award of MBE. The award was popular with young people and contributed to a sense that the prime minister was "in touch" with the younger generation. There were some protests by conservatives and elderly members of the military who were earlier recipients of the award, but such protesters were in the minority. Critics claimed that Wilson acted to solicit votes for the next general election (which took place less than a year later), but defenders noted that, since the minimum voting age at that time was 21, this was hardly likely to impact many of the Beatles' fans who at that time were predominantly teenagers. It cemented Wilson's image as a modernistic leader and linked him to the burgeoning pride in the 'New Britain' typified by the Beatles. The Beatles mentioned Wilson rather negatively, naming both him and his opponent Edward Heath in George Harrison's song "Taxman", the opener to 1966's Revolver—recorded and released after the MBEs.

In 1967 Wilson had a different interaction with a musical ensemble. He sued the pop group the Move for libel after the band's manager Tony Secunda published a promotional postcard for the single "Flowers in the Rain", featuring a caricature depicting Wilson in bed with his female assistant, Marcia Williams. Gossip had hinted at an improper relationship, though these rumours were never substantiated. Wilson won the case, and all royalties from the song (composed by Move leader Roy Wood) were assigned in perpetuity to a charity of Wilson's choosing.

Wilson coined the term 'Selsdon Man' to refer to the free market policies of the Conservative leader Edward Heath, developed at a policy retreat held at the Selsdon Park Hotel in early 1970. This phrase, intended to evoke the 'primitive throwback' qualities of anthropological discoveries such as Piltdown Man and Swanscombe Man, was part of a British political tradition of referring to political trends by suffixing 'man'. Other memorable phrases attributed to Wilson include "the white heat of the [technological] revolution", and "a week is a long time in politics", meaning that political fortunes can change extremely rapidly. In his broadcast after the 1967 devaluation of the pound, Wilson said: "This does not mean that the pound here in Britain—in your pocket or purse—is worth any less" and the phrase "the pound in your pocket" subsequently took on a life of its own.

=== Reputation ===
Despite his successes, Wilson's reputation took a long time to recover from the low ebb reached after his second premiership. The reinvention of the Labour Party would take the better part of two decades at the hands of Neil Kinnock, John Smith and, electorally and most conclusively, Tony Blair. Disillusion with Britain's weak economic performance and troubled industrial relations, combined with campaigning by figures such as Sir Keith Joseph, had helped to make a radical market programme politically feasible for Margaret Thatcher (which was, in turn, to influence the subsequent Labour leadership, especially under Blair). An opinion poll in September 2011 found that Wilson came in third place when respondents were asked to name the best post-war Labour Party leader. He was beaten only by John Smith and Tony Blair.

According to Glen O'Hara in 2006:

Much of the disillusionment with Harold Wilson as Labour's leader and prime minister was due to his perceived failure on the economic front. He pledged not to devalue sterling, but did exactly that in 1967; he promised to keep unemployment low, but had by 1970 accepted a higher rate of joblessness than the Conservatives had managed. Some of the elements in Labour's programme – the emphasis on steadier growth, for instance – were probably misguided. These problems and defeats have, however, obscured some of the real achievements of the period. Science and education spending grew very quickly; industrial investment rose; government was increasingly well informed and better advised about the performance of the economy. In an increasingly unstable and rapidly changing economic environment, this government's economic record is here shown to be, if not hugely impressive, then at least relatively creditable.

== Possible plots and conspiracy theories ==
In 1963, Soviet defector Anatoliy Golitsyn is said to have secretly claimed that Wilson was a KGB agent. The majority of intelligence officers did not believe that Golitsyn was credible in this and various other claims, but a significant number did (most prominently James Jesus Angleton, Deputy Director of Operations for Counterintelligence at the US Central Intelligence Agency) and factional strife broke out between the two groups. Former MI5 officer Peter Wright claimed in his memoirs, Spycatcher, that 30 MI5 agents then collaborated in an attempt to undermine Wilson. He later retracted that claim, saying that there was only one man.

In March 1987, James Miller, a former agent, claimed that the Ulster Workers' Council strike of 1974 had been promoted by MI5 to help destabilise Wilson's government. In July 1987, Labour MP Ken Livingstone used his maiden speech to raise the 1975 allegations of a former Army Press officer in Northern Ireland, Colin Wallace, who also alleged a plot to destabilise Wilson. Chris Mullin MP, speaking on 23 November 1988, argued that sources other than Peter Wright supported claims of a long-standing attempt by MI5 to undermine Wilson's government.

On the BBC television programme The Plot Against Harold Wilson, broadcast on 16 March 2006 on BBC Two, it was claimed there were threats of a coup d'état against the Wilson government, which were corroborated by leading figures of the time on both the left and the right. Wilson told two BBC journalists, Barrie Penrose and Roger Courtiour, who recorded the meetings on a cassette tape recorder, that he feared he was being undermined by MI5. The first time was in the late 1960s after the Wilson government devalued the pound sterling but the threat faded after Conservative leader Edward Heath won the election of 1970. However, following the 1972 British miners' strike Heath decided to hold an election to renew his mandate to govern in February 1974 but lost narrowly to Wilson. There was again talk of a military coup, with rumours of Lord Mountbatten as head of an interim administration after Wilson had been deposed. In 1974, the British Army occupied Heathrow Airport on the grounds of training for possible IRA terrorist action at the airport. Although the military stated that this was a planned military exercise, 10 Downing Street was not informed in advance, and Wilson himself interpreted it as a show of strength, or warning, being made by the army.

Historian Christopher Andrew's official history of MI5, The Defence of the Realm: The Authorized History of MI5, included a chapter (section E part 4) specifically alluding to a conspiracy instead of a plot against Wilson in the 1970s:

The characterisation of Harold Wilson as paranoid does not take account of the political context of the time, which was characterised by a paranoid political style generally which applied to both left and right (including MI5 itself). The suspicion of Wilson and others towards the unlawful activities of the security services and other right-wing figures resulted from concrete domestic and international developments discussed in more detail below. Andrew is correct to be sceptical, and there remains limited evidence of a 'plot' if a plot is defined as a tightly organised high-level conspiracy with a detailed plan. However, there is evidence of a conspiracy: a loosely connected series of unlawful manoeuvres against an elected government by a group of like-minded figures.

The Director-General of the Security Service assured Prime Minister Margaret Thatcher, and she told the House of Commons on 6 May 1987:

He has found no evidence of any truth in the allegations. He has given me his personal assurance that the stories are false. In particular, he has advised me that all the Security Service officers who have been interviewed have categorically denied that they were involved in, or were aware of, any activities or plans to undermine or discredit Lord Wilson and his Government when he was prime minister.

In 2009, The Defence of the Realm held that while MI5 kept a file on Wilson from 1945 when he became an MP—because communist civil servants claimed that he had similar political sympathies—there was no bugging of his home or office, and no conspiracy against him. In 2010 newspaper reports made detailed allegations that the Cabinet Office had required that the section on bugging of 10 Downing Street be omitted from the history for "wider public interest reasons". In 1963, on Macmillan's orders following the Profumo affair, MI5 bugged the Cabinet room, the waiting room, and the prime minister's study until the devices were removed in 1977 on Callaghan's orders. From the records, it is unclear if Wilson or Heath knew of the bugging, and no recorded conversations were retained by MI5 so possibly the bugs were never activated. Professor Andrew had previously recorded in the preface of the history that "One significant excision as a result of these [Cabinet Office] requirements (in the chapter on The Wilson Plot) is, I believe, hard to justify", giving credence to these new allegations.

As a result of his concerns about the danger to British parliamentary democracy, Wilson issued instructions that no agency should ever bug the telephones of any members of Parliament, a policy (still in place) which came to be known as the Wilson Doctrine.

== Honours ==
- Wilson was elected a Fellow of the Royal Society (FRS) in 1969 under Statute 12 of the Society's regulations, which covers people who have rendered conspicuous service to the cause of science or are such that their election would be of signal benefit to the Society.
- In 2013, the Government of Bangladesh posthumously awarded Wilson with the Friends of Liberation War Honour for highlighting the plight of the people of Bangladesh during the Bangladesh Liberation War.

=== Statues and other tributes ===
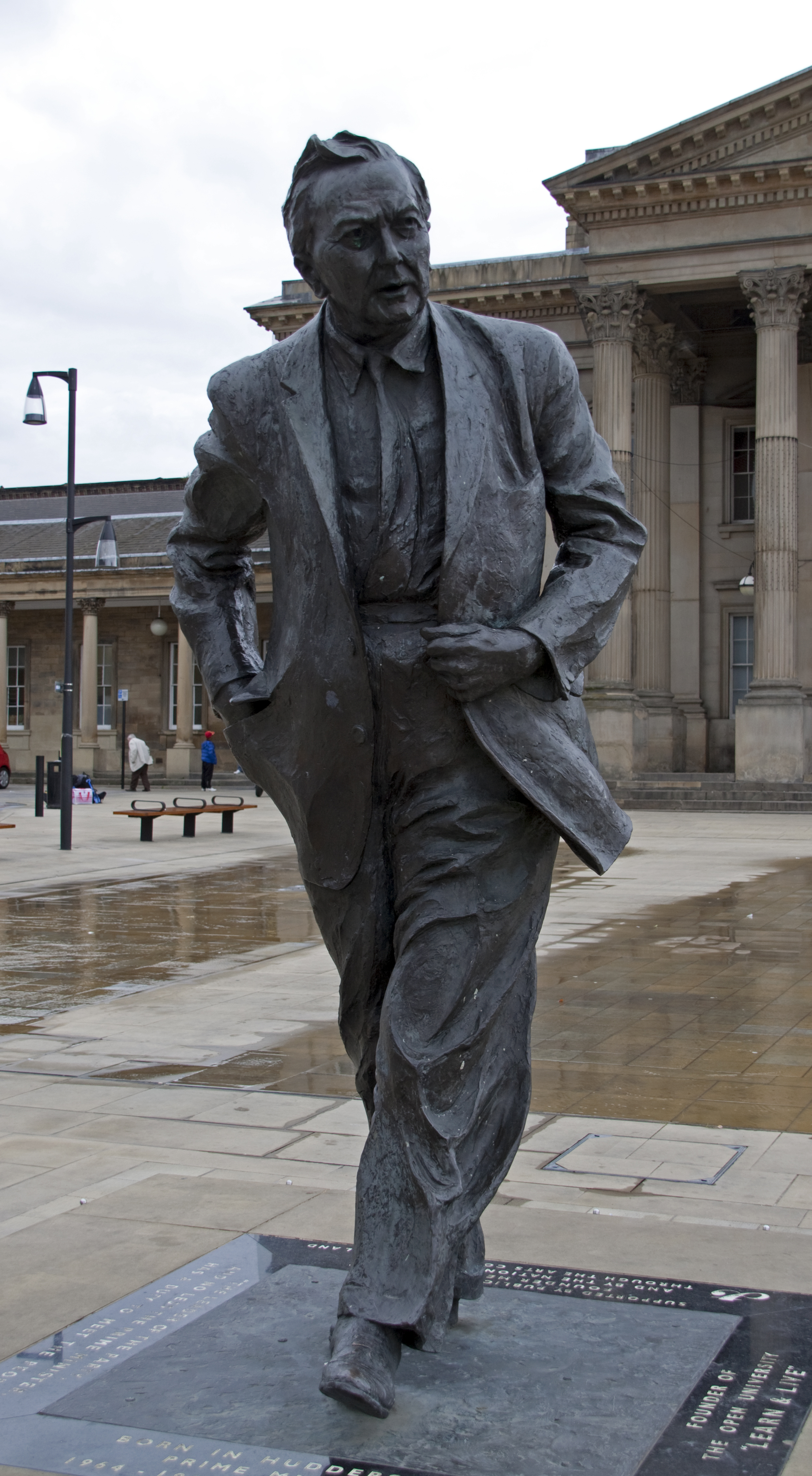
Statue in St George's Square, Huddersfield

A portrait of Harold Wilson, painted by the Scottish portrait artist Cowan Dobson, hangs today at University College, Oxford. Two statues of Harold Wilson stand in prominent places. The first, unveiled by the then prime minister Tony Blair in July 1999, stands outside Huddersfield railway station in St George's Square, Huddersfield. Costing £70,000, the statue, designed by sculptor Ian Walters, is based on photographs taken in 1964 and depicts Wilson in walking pose at the start of his first term as prime minister. His widow, Mary requested that the eight-foot-tall monument not show Wilson holding his famous pipe as she feared it would make the representation a caricature.

In September 2006, Tony Blair unveiled a second bronze statue of Wilson in the latter's former constituency of Huyton, near Liverpool. The statue was created by Liverpool sculptor, Tom Murphy, and Blair paid tribute to Wilson's legacy at the unveiling, including the Open University. He added: "He also brought in a whole new culture, a whole new country. He made the country very, very different".

Also in 2006, a street on a new housing development in Tividale, West Midlands, was named Wilson Drive in honour of Wilson. Along with neighbouring new development Callaghan Drive (named after James Callaghan), it formed part of a large housing estate developed since the 1960s where all streets were named after former prime ministers or senior parliamentary figures.

A block of high-rise flats in Huddersfield are named after Wilson.

== Arms ==
Coat of arms of Harold Wilson
Notes As a Knight Companion of the Garter, Wilson's arms were displayed on a stall plate at St George's Chapel, Windsor. Crest Upon a rock a lighthouse in front thereof a spade blade downwards and a quill point downwards in saltire all Proper. Escutcheon Argent an ancient ship Proper on a chief Gules a stag's head caboshed Or between two water bougets Argent. Supporters Dexter a winged lion Purpure charged on the wing with three roses Argent barbed and seeded Proper sinister a griffin Or charged on the wing with three roses Gules barbed and seeded Proper. Motto Tempus Rerum Imperator

== Scholastic honours ==
Chancellor, visitor, governor, and fellowships

Location	Date	School	Position
England	1977	University of Huddersfield	Honorary Fellow
England	1966–1985	University of Bradford	Chancellor

Honorary degrees

Location	Date	School	Degree
England	1964	Lancaster University	Doctor of Laws (LL.D)
England	1965	University of Liverpool	Doctor of Laws (LL.D)
England	1966	University of Sussex	Doctor of Laws (LL.D)
England	1966	University of Nottingham	Doctor of Laws (LL.D)
England	1967	University of Essex	Doctorate
England	18 May 1974	Open University	Doctor of the University (D.Univ)
Israel	1976	Bar-Ilan University	Doctor of Philosophy (Ph.D)

== Notes ==
Parliament of the United Kingdom
Preceded by Stephen King-Hall	Member of Parliament for Ormskirk; 1945–1950	Succeeded by Ronald Cross
New constituency	Member of Parliament for Huyton; 1950–1983	Constituency abolished
Political offices
Preceded by Reginald Manningham-Buller	Parliamentary Secretary at the Ministry of Works; 1945–1947	Succeeded by Evan Durbin
Preceded by Hilary Marquand	Secretary for Overseas Trade; 1947	Succeeded by Arthur Bottomley
Preceded by Stafford Cripps	President of the Board of Trade; 1947–1951	Succeeded by Hartley Shawcross
Preceded by Hugh Gaitskell	Shadow Chancellor of the Exchequer; 1955–1961	Succeeded by James Callaghan
Preceded by Denis Healey	Shadow Foreign Secretary; 1961–1963	Succeeded by Patrick Gordon Walker
Preceded by George Brown	Leader of the Opposition; 1963–1964	Succeeded by Alec Douglas-Home
Preceded by Alec Douglas-Home	Prime Minister of the United Kingdom; 1964–1970	Succeeded by Edward Heath
Preceded by Alec Douglas-Home	First Lord of the Treasury; 1964–1970	Succeeded by Edward Heath
New office	Minister for the Civil Service; 1968–1970	Succeeded by Edward Heath
Preceded by Edward Heath	Leader of the Opposition; 1970–1974	Succeeded by Edward Heath
Preceded by Edward Heath	Prime Minister of the United Kingdom; 1974–1976	Succeeded by James Callaghan
Preceded by Edward Heath	First Lord of the Treasury; 1974–1976	Succeeded by James Callaghan
Preceded by Edward Heath	Minister for the Civil Service; 1974–1976	Succeeded by James Callaghan
Party political offices
Preceded by Austen Albu	Chair of the Fabian Society; 1954–1955	Succeeded by Margaret Cole
Preceded by Richard Crossman	Chair of the Labour Party; 1961–1962	Succeeded by Dai Davies
Preceded by Hugh Gaitskell	Leader of the Labour Party; 1963–1976	Succeeded by James Callaghan
Academic offices
New office	Chancellor of the University of Bradford; 1966–1985	Succeeded by John Harvey-Jones
Preceded by George Barnard	President of the Royal Statistical Society; 1972–1973	Succeeded by D. J. Finney
