= 1962 Labour Party deputy leadership election =

UK political party election

- 8 November 1962
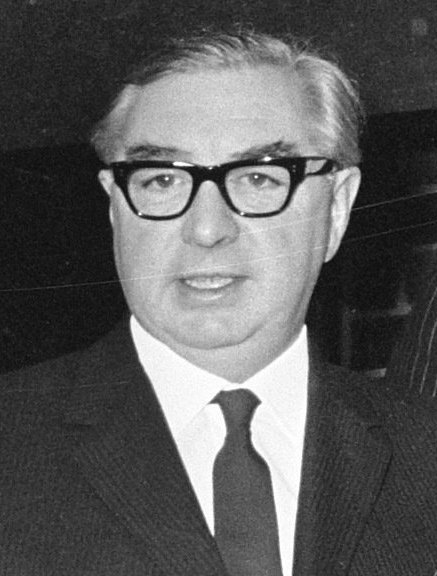

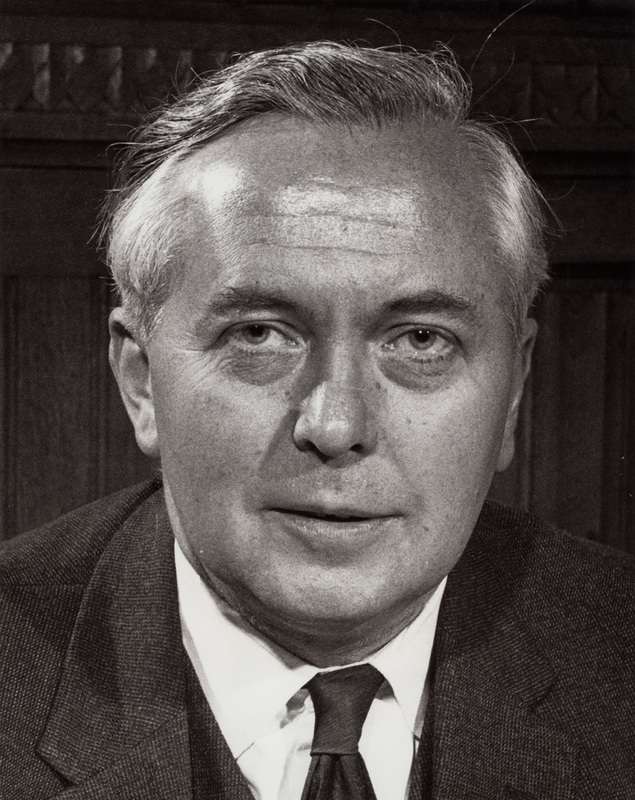
Candidate	George Brown	Harold Wilson
Popular vote	133	103
Percentage	56.4%	43.6%
Deputy Leader before election
George Brown
Elected Deputy Leader
George Brown

The 1962 Labour Party deputy leadership election took place on 8 November 1962, after sitting deputy leader George Brown was challenged by Harold Wilson.

== Candidates ==
- George Brown, incumbent Deputy Leader of the Labour Party, Member of Parliament for Belper
- Harold Wilson, Shadow Foreign Secretary, Member of Parliament for Huyton

== Results ==
Only ballot: 8 November 1962
Candidate	Votes	%
George Brown	133	56.4
Harold Wilson	103	43.6
George Brown re-elected
