= Bum steer =

English-language idiom with maritime origins, referring to misinformation

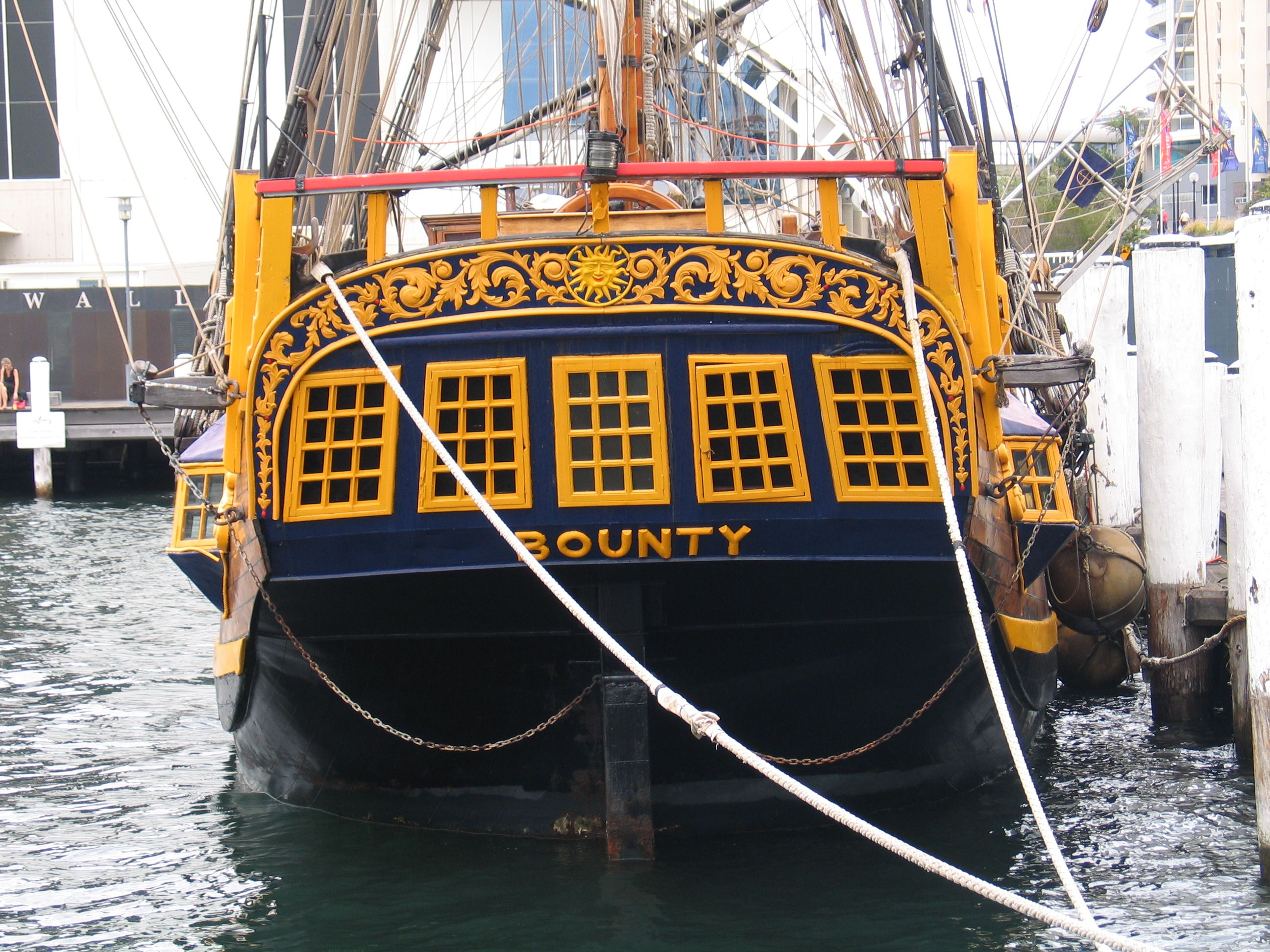
Bounty (1978 ship) showing the stern and rudder of a typical sailing vessel of the 19th century

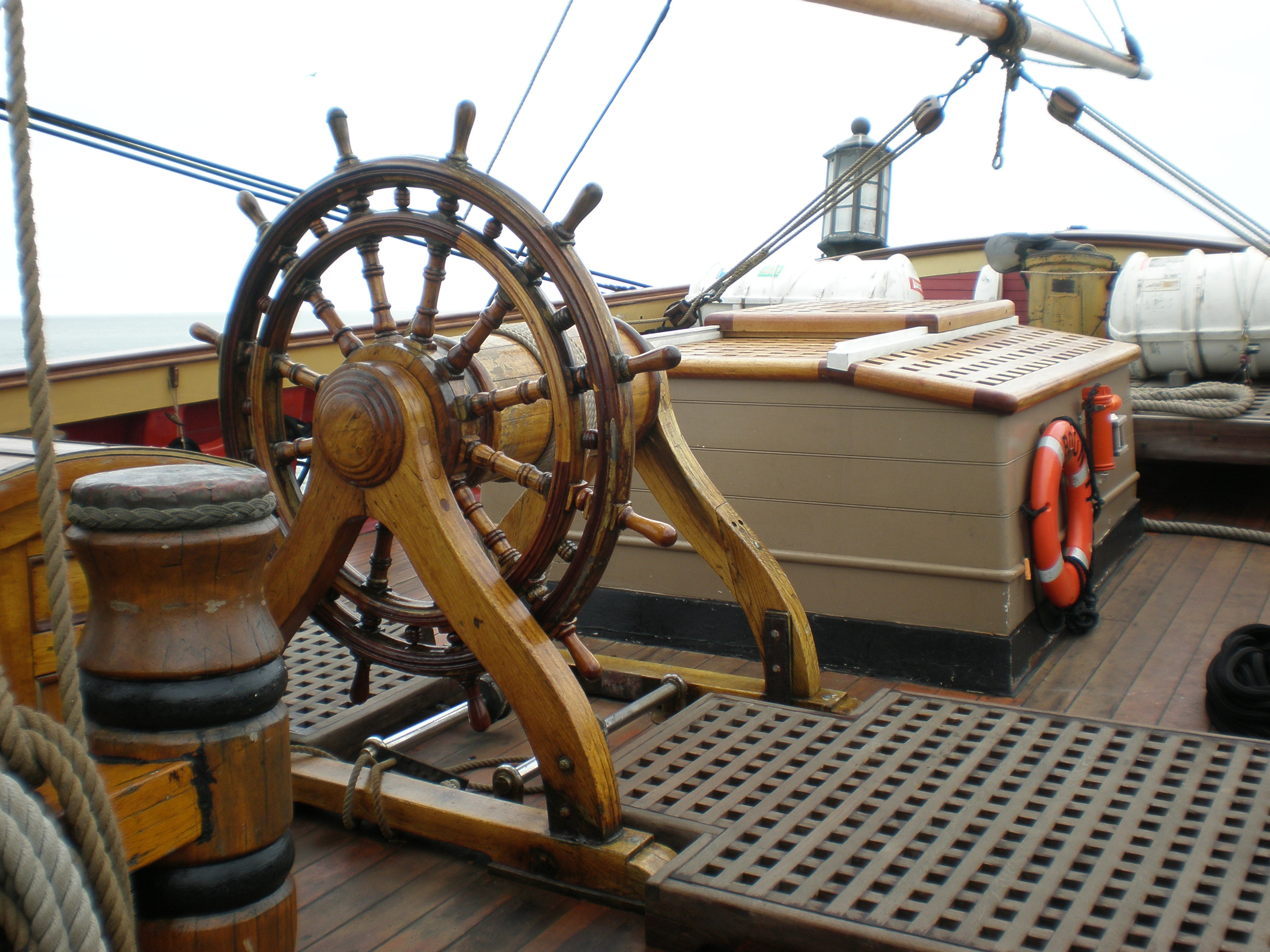
Bounty (1960 ship) showing steering wheel and its location relative to the stern on a vessel of the 19th century

"Bum steer", a term denoting misdirection, is predominantly from Australia, New Zealand and North America. The idiom means to provide information, intentionally or unintentionally, that is incorrect, was unhelpful, or caused one to be led astray. The idiom, as used in Australia and New Zealand, reached the United States in the 1920s probably after exposure to Australian troops on the Western Front during World War I, and is recorded in the UK since 1944.

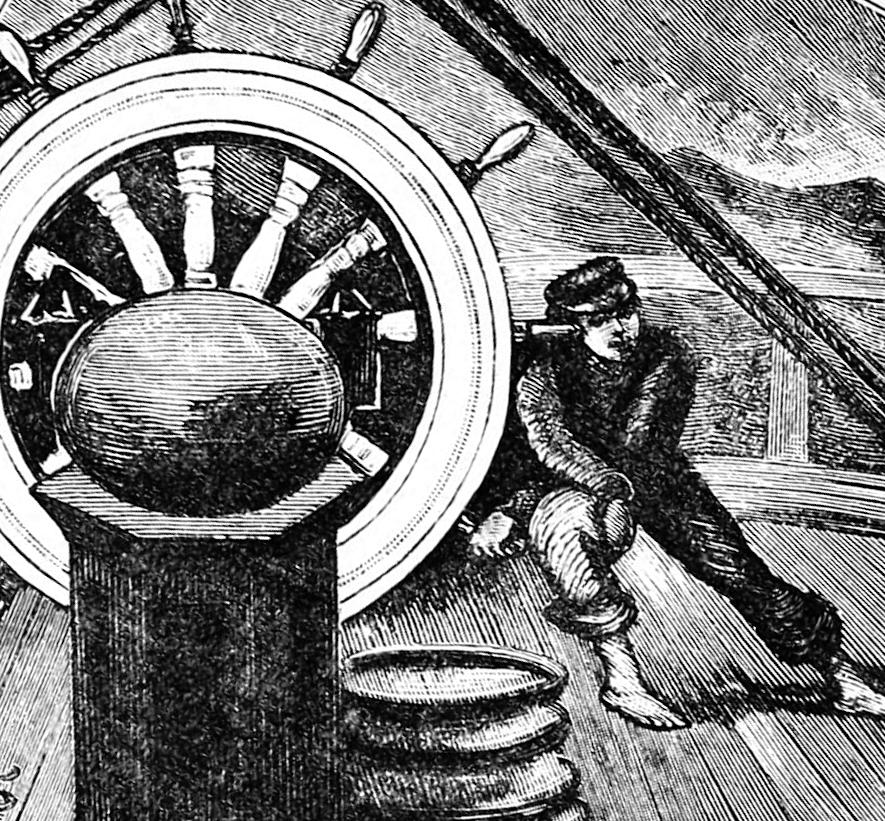
Sailors often misheard directions when attempting to steer the ship in reverse due to differing nationalities assigned to the ship.

Its origin is possibly from 19th-century American maritime humour and the difficulty of trying to steer a vessel in reverse. A ship's stern is flat and lacks the pointed structure of a bow, and a ship is therefore difficult to maneuver in reverse when using the rudder, also found on the stern. The reverse maneuvering was accomplished therefore through shouted instructions from the wharf to the wheelhouse, via intermediary deckhands. Such communication was prone to misunderstanding owing to the wide variety of nationalities employed on United States merchant vessels during the 19th century.
