= James Jones (civil servant) =

Sir James Duncan Jones, KCB (28 October 1914 – 6 September 1995) was a Scottish civil servant. Educated at the University of Glasgow and University College, Oxford, he volunteered for service in the Royal Navy in 1940. He was handpicked to enter the P division of the Admiralty (managing warship production) in 1941 and in 1944 became private secretary to the Permanent Secretary. In 1946, he entered the Ministry of Town and Country Planning, which soon merged to form the Ministry of Housing and Local Government. Promoted to deputy secretary in 1963, he moved to the Ministry of Transport in 1966 and in 1970 to the Department of the Environment, where he was Permanent Secretary from 1972 to 1975. He was Secretary to the Local Government Commission for England from 1958 to 1961.
