= John Herbecq =

English civil servant (1922–2021)

Sir John Edward Herbecq, KCB (29 May 1922 – 7 September 2021) was an English civil servant. He entered the civil service in 1939 as an official in the Colonial Office and subsequently served in HM Treasury (1950–60, 1962–68) and the United Kingdom Atomic Energy Authority (1960–62). He moved to the Civil Service Department in 1968 and served as its Second Permanent Secretary from 1975 to 1981. In retirement, he was a Church Commissioner from 1982 to 1996. In 2006, he deposited an unpublished personal memoir from 2002 and related papers at the Churchill Archives Centre at Churchill College, Cambridge.

Government offices
| Preceded by Sir Ian Bancroft | Second Permanent Secretary of the Civil Service Department; 1975–1981 | Succeeded by none |
