= Secretary of State for Economic Affairs =

Former cabinet-level position in British government

United Kingdom Secretary of State for Economic Affairs
- Royal Arms as used by His Majesty's Government

- Flag of the United Kingdom
- Department of Economic Affairs
- Style: The Right Honourable (formal prefix); Economic Affairs Secretary
- Member of: British Cabinet; Privy Council
- Reports to: The Prime Minister
- Seat: Westminster, London
- Appointer: The British Monarch on advice of the Prime Minister
- Term length: No fixed term
- Inaugural holder: George Brown
- Formation: 19 October 1964
- Abolished: 6 October 1969; Functions reincorporated into HM Treasury

The Secretary of State for Economic Affairs was briefly an office of Her Majesty's government in the United Kingdom. It was established by Harold Wilson in October 1964. Wilson had been impressed by the six-week experiment of a minister for economic affairs in 1947, an office occupied by Stafford Cripps before he was appointed Chancellor of the Exchequer. The office was revived for eight months in 1950 and held by Hugh Gaitskell. After a Conservative victory at the 1951 election, Winston Churchill also appointed a minister of economic affairs, Arthur Salter, in the period 1951–52.

Wilson's advisers Patrick Blackett and Thomas Balogh advised him to create a new ministry, to be called the Department of Economic Affairs (DEA), in order to drive through his economic plan. Wilson wanted to divide the functions of the Treasury in two, in part to reduce its power. The DEA was to undertake long-term planning of the economy and industry, while the Treasury would determine short-term revenue raising and financial management. The DEA was therefore tasked with the preparation of a national plan for the economy, which was published in September 1965.

Critics of Wilson's approach, including Douglas Jay, suspected the main reason for the department was to appease George Brown, the deputy leader of the Labour Party. The (true) story told at the time, that Brown finally accepted the job while riding in a taxi with Wilson, tended to lend credence to this analysis.

Under Brown, the department had a reasonable degree of influence. However, Brown was moved to the Foreign Office in August 1966, and the two succeeding secretaries of state were not of his rank. The Treasury was able to claw back its power, and the Department had become moribund long before it was wound up in 1969.

The DEA was the model for the fictional Department of Administrative Affairs in the television series Yes Minister.

== Department of Economic Affairs (1947; 1950 and 1951–52) ==
=== Ministers for economic affairs ===
Colour key (for political parties):
Labour
Conservative

Name	Term of office		Political party	P.M.	Chancellor
Sir Stafford Cripps; MP for Bristol East	29 September 1947	13 November 1947	Labour	Attlee	Dalton
Office not in use	1947–1950			Attlee	Cripps
Hugh Gaitskell; MP for Leeds South	28 February 1950	19 October 1950	Labour	Attlee	Cripps
Office not in use	1950–1951			Attlee	Gaitskell
Sir Arthur Salter; MP for Ormskirk	26 October 1951	November 1952	Conservative	Churchill	Butler

== Department of Economic Affairs (1964–1969) ==
=== Secretaries of state for economic affairs ===
Colour key (for political parties):
Labour

Name	Term of office		Political party	P.M.	Chancellor
George Brown; MP for Belper	16 October 1964	11 August 1966	Labour	Wilson	Callaghan
Michael Stewart; MP for Fulham	11 August 1966	29 August 1967	Labour	Wilson	Callaghan
Peter Shore; MP for Stepney	29 August 1967	6 October 1969	Labour	Wilson	Jenkins

=== Ministers of state for economic affairs ===
- Anthony Crosland (20 October 1964 – 22 January 1965) – nominally Economic Secretary to the Treasury until 22 December 1964
- Austen Albu (27 January 1965 – 7 January 1967)
- Thomas Urwin (6 April 1968 – 6 October 1969)

=== Under-secretaries of state for economic affairs ===
- Maurice Foley (21 October 1964 – 6 April 1966)
- Bill Rodgers (21 October 1964 – 7 January 1967)
- Harold Lever (7 January 1967 – 29 August 1967)
- Peter Shore (7 January 1967 – 29 August 1967)
- Alan Williams (29 August 1967 – 6 October 1969)
- Edmund Dell (29 August 1967 – 6 April 1968)
