= Tuck Everlasting =

Tuck Everlasting may refer to:

- Tuck Everlasting (novel), an American children's novel written by Natalie Babbitt
- Tuck Everlasting (1981 film), a film directed by Frederick King Keller
- Tuck Everlasting (2002 film), a Disney film starring Alexis Bledel
- Tuck Everlasting (musical), musical performed on Broadway and in Atlanta 2015–16
