= Tim Federle =

American author, actor, director and screenwriter

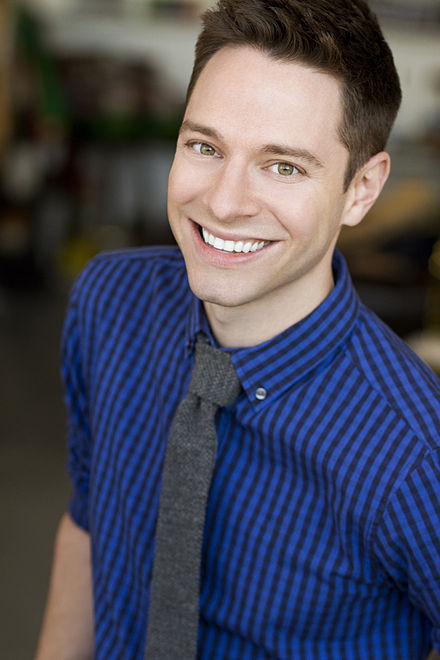
- Born: Timothy Michael Federle; March 24, 1980 (age 46); Foster City, California, U.S.
- Occupations: Writer, director, actor
- Writing career
- Genres: Humor, Children's
- Notable awards: Golden Kite Award 2014; Lambda Literary Award 2015; Odyssey Award 2014 and 2015
- Website: www.timfederle.com

Timothy Michael Federle (born March 24, 1980) is an American author, librettist, director writer, and producer.

Federle wrote the middle-grade novel Better Nate Than Ever and its two sequels and the cocktail recipe book Tequila Mockingbird and its two follow-ups, and was co-writer of the book for the Broadway musical adaptation of Tuck Everlasting, also titled Tuck Everlasting. He is the creator of Disney+ series High School Musical: The Musical: The Series.

== Biography ==
Federle was born in Foster City, California, on March 24, 1980, and raised in the Pittsburgh, Pennsylvania suburb of Upper St. Clair. the setting for much of his fiction. Prior to his writing career, Federle appeared in the original casts of The Little Mermaid and Gypsy (2003 Bernadette Peters revival), as an actor, dancer and singer. He worked on the resident choreographic staff of Billy Elliot the Musical, serving as dance captain.

== Works ==
=== Fiction ===
Better Nate Than Ever (2013, Simon & Schuster): Federle's debut novel for middle graders, Better Nate Than Ever, tells the story of 13-year-old Nate, who sneaks away from his home in Pennsylvania to audition for E.T: The Musical on Broadway. In a CNN article about the book, Federle said: "I think so often when you're a kid, we mellow out those more interesting edges in order to coast through middle school quietly. By the time you get to high school, you're left asking, who the heck am I? I would encourage kids to try and figure out the thing that sets you apart, not publicly but that you're passionate about internally." Nate was published to critical acclaim and has gone into multiple printings since its release. Described by the Huffington Post as "Judy Blume as seen through a Stephen Sondheim lens," and The New York Times as "inspired and inspiring," Better Nate Than Ever has been celebrated as unique for being a "book where teenage sexuality is treated with a light touch". The novel was an Amazon Best Book of 2013, a New York Times Notable Book of 2013, a Stonewall Book Award Honor Book, and a Lambda Literary Award finalist. The audio book was an Odyssey Award Honor Book, and was narrated by Federle. In 2021, Walt Disney Studios Motion Pictures announced a film adaptation of the book with Federle himself serving as both writer and director for the film. It was later announced that Better Nate Than Ever would debut on Disney+ in the spring of 2022.

Five, Six, Seven, Nate! (2014, Simon & Schuster): In December 2013, Entertainment Weekly ran an excerpt of Five, Six, Seven, Nate!, Federle's follow-up to Better Nate Than Ever. The sequel charts Nate's continued adventures in New York City as he navigates his role in the creation of a major Broadway musical. A Kirkus Reviews starred review called the novel an "Encore performance that will leave them standing in the aisles." Five, Six, Seven, Nate! was chosen as a Junior Library Guild selection, an Amazon Best Book of 2014, and an American Booksellers Association Best Book for Children. Federle won his second Odyssey Honor Book award for the audio book edition. Five, Six, Seven, Nate! was also a 2015 LGBT Children's/Young Adult LAMBDA Literary Award Winner.

Summer Days and Summer Nights (2016, St. Martin's Press): On March 3, 2015 young adult fiction author Stephanie Perkins announced on Twitter that she will be editing a forthcoming YA anthology, Summer Days and Summer Nights, featuring twelve new stories from bestselling authors Leigh Bardugo, Francesca Lia Block, Libba Bray, Cassandra Clare, Brandy Colbert, Tim Federle, Lev Grossman, Nina LaCour, Stephanie Perkins, Veronica Roth, Jon Skovron, and Jennifer E. Smith. According to a Publishers Weekly announcement, St. Martins Press is set to release the collection in summer 2016. The anthology is a follow-up to Perkins' My True Love Gave To Me: Twelve Holiday Stories, published to acclaim in 2014.

The Great American Whatever (2016, Simon & Schuster): In June 2015 Huffington Post revealed the cover of Federle's forthcoming young adult novel, The Great American Whatever. Federle's first title for young adults is about Quinn Roberts, "a sixteen-year-old smart aleck", who dreams of Hollywood and becoming a professional screenwriter. The novel is receiving advance praise from authors and critics alike, with Veronica Mars' Rob Thomas calling it "original, authentic, engaging". It has also received starred reviews from the publishing trade journals School Library Journal, Booklist, and Kirkus Reviews, who called it "a Holden Caulfield for a new generation." A Huffington Post article about the creation of the book stated that "Federle had a mature audience in mind when he began writing the book, originally titled Quinn, Victorious, five years ago, basing the plot on his personal experiences as seen through characters in their mid-20s." Following the novel's publishing, the Huffington Post called The Great American Whatever "the gay young adult novel you've been waiting for." In November 2016, The Great American Whatever was named a New York Times Notable Children's Book of 2016. The Great American Whatever is one of Kirkus' Best Teen Books of 2016.

Nate Expectations (2018, Simon & Schuster): On January 11, 2018, the Huffington Post exclusively revealed the title and cover of the third novel in Federle's "Nate" series, Nate Expectations. The latest installment follows teenage Nate after he moves back to his Pennsylvania hometown following his Broadway debut, wrapping up the trilogy with what Federle calls the third step in a Broadway journey, "Dealing with life when the show closes or gets crappy reviews." Nate Expectations features a cover designed by Rex Bonomelli, the previous two entries in the series, Better Nate Than Ever and Five, Six, Seven, Nate! also received Bonomelli cover refreshes once Nate Expectations hit shelves.

=== Cocktail guides ===
Tequila Mockingbird: Cocktails with a Literary Twist (2013, Perseus Books): Federle's first novelty cocktail recipe book, Tequila Mockingbird was featured as a clue on Jeopardy! in October 2014. Federle has said the inspiration for the book was his own mother's book club, which "would dissolve into opening wine". In an April 2014 interview with School Library Journal, Federle was quoted as saying, "Tequila Mockingbird came out of a silly one line email to my agent, Brenda Bowen—'Hey, do you think the Urban Outfitters crowd would go for a literary cocktail guide?' I truly wrote the proposal on a whim." The book went on to be sold at Urban Outfitters and ModCloth, among other specialty retailers, and was cited as one of Perseus Book Publisher's leading titles, along with Friday Night Lights and Black Mass, in a September 2015 Wall Street Journal article. According to a December 2014 article in The Atlantic, Tequila Mockingbird has thus far sold over 100,000 copies.

Hickory Daiquiri Dock: Cocktails with a Nursery Rhyme Twist (2014, Perseus Books): The second installment in Federle's cocktail book series, Hickory Daiquiri Dock features twists on popular nursery rhymes, such as "Jack and Coke (and Jill)," "Baa, Baa, Black Russian," and "Old MacDonald Had a Flask." The Tampa Bay Times called it "More fun at a baby shower than a Diaper Genie" and The Atlantic called it "naughty, but never crass," and compared its irreverent take on parenting to the viral phenomenon Go the Fuck to Sleep.

Gone with the Gin: Cocktails with a Hollywood Twist (2015, Perseus Books): Gone with the Gin, published in October 2015, features drinks including "A Sidecar Named Desire," "No Country for Old Fashioneds," and "Bonnie and Mudslide." Like Tequila Mockingbird, Gone with the Gin includes recipes for bar bites and ideas for drinking games.

=== Self-help ===
Life is Like a Musical: How to Live, Love, and Lead Like a Star (2017, Hachette Book Group): In May 2017, Entertainment Weekly announced and revealed the cover for Federle's first self-help book for adults, based on his experiences as a performer prior to becoming a professional writer. Due in October 2017, Federle confirmed the book via his Twitter, describing it as "Don't Sweat the Small Stuff with jazz hands."

=== In Broadway ===
Federle made his debut as a musical theater co-librettist in 2016 with the Broadway adaptation of Natalie Babbitt's Tuck Everlasting, also titled Tuck Everlasting. Following a pre-Broadway tryout at the Alliance Theatre in Atlanta, the musical began its Broadway engagement at the Broadhurst Theatre in March 2016. The Broadway iteration was nominated for two Drama League Awards, and three Outer Critics Circle Awards, including Outstanding Musical for both.

The book and the musical version tell the story of Winnie Foster, an 11-year old who stumbles upon a family that has discovered the secret to immortality. Andrew Keenan-Bolger and Sarah Charles Lewis star as Jesse Tuck and Winnie Foster, respectively. The artistic team is led by director-choreographer Casey Nicholaw, with music and lyrics by Chris Miller and Nathan Tysen. Federle is co-writing the musical's libretto with Claudia Shear.

Ferderle is the book writer of the upcoming stage musical adaptation of The Greatest Showman, based on the 2017 film with songs by Benj Pasek and Justin Paul and produced by Disney Theatrical Productions, which will premiere at the Bristol Hippodrome in spring 2026.

=== In film ===
Ferdinand (2017, 20th Century Fox/Blue Sky Studios): Federle co-wrote the screenplay for Ferdinand, the 2017 animated film based on Munro Leaf's children's book, The Story of Ferdinand. Both the book and the film center around a bull who "would rather smell flowers than fight in bullfights." Ferdinand stars John Cena in the titular role, along with Kate McKinnon, Bobby Cannavale, David Tennant, Gina Rodriguez, and Daveed Diggs. The film was released on December 15, 2017. Ferdinand was a 2018 Golden Globe Award and Academy Awards nominee for Best Animated Film.

=== In television ===
Federle is the writer and executive producer of the Disney+ series High School Musical: The Musical: The Series. The series' first season became available on the streaming service in the winter of 2019–2020 and the second season became available spring of 2021. The third season was released in the summer of 2022. The series fourth and final season premiered on Disney+ on August 7, 2023.

In 2022, Disney Branded Television extended its multiyear overall deal with Federle and his Chorus Boy Productions banner. As part of this deal, Federle will serve as executive producer for Vampirina: Teenage Vampire, which premiered on Disney Channel and Disney+ on September 12, 2025. In August 2025 it was announced that Coven Academy, a brand new Disney Channel and Disney+ show created and executive produced by Federle, had entered production and will release on 2026.

== Filmography ==
| Year | Title | Director | Writer | Executive Producer | Notes |
|---|---|---|---|---|---|
| 2019–2023 | High School Musical: The Musical: The Series | Yes | Yes | Yes | Chorus Boy, Disney+ Original Series |
| 2022 | Better Nate Than Ever | Yes | Yes | No | Disney+ Original Movie |
| 2025–present | Vampirina: Teenage Vampire | No | No | Yes | Chorus Boy, Disney Channel series |
| 2026 | Camp Rock 3 | No | No | Yes | Chorus Boy, Disney Channel Original Movie |
| 2026 | Coven Academy | Yes | Yes | Yes | Chorus Boy, Freeform series |
| 2027 | Romy and Michele 2 | Yes | No | Producer | Chorus Boy |
