= Sarah Charles Lewis =

American actress

Sarah Charles Lewis (born August 25th, 2004) is an American actress. She played Winnie Foster in the musical Tuck Everlasting on Broadway.

Lewis began taking performing arts classes at Renaissance International School of Performing Arts (RISPA) when she was five years old. By 2015, she took lessons at RISPA for 20 hours a week.

Lewis made her professional stage debut in the musical Annie as the title character, in April 2014. She played Winnie Foster in the musical Tuck Everlasting's 2015 world premiere at Atlanta's Alliance Theatre. She was selected for the same role in the musical's Broadway debut. Following a month of previews, Lewis made her official Broadway debut at the Broadhurst Theatre, on opening night, April 26, 2016, performing the role until the production closed on May 29, 2016.

== Early life ==
Sarah Charles Lewis was born in August 2004. Her mother, Jennifer Lewis, majored in music and is a real estate agent. Her father, Shack Lewis, acted at the Alliance Theatre when he was 12 years old. Jennifer and Shack Lewis became acquainted through a band. They continued performing in the band until the eighth month of Jennifer's pregnancy with Sarah. Sarah's brother, Harrison, is roughly four years her senior and is an actor.

When she was four years old, Lewis attended dance classes. Beginning when she was five years old, Lewis took performing arts lessons at Renaissance International School of Performing Arts (RISPA) in Alpharetta, Georgia. At RISPA, she participated in a number of shows such as the musicals Seussical and Shrek. By 2015, she was training 20 hours every week at RISPA, taking ballet, tap dancing, voice lessons, and acting lessons. Her first role on stage was in an ensemble position in Once on This Island when she was six. Throughout her youth, Lewis has participated in performing arts workshops and has been deeply immersed in nearby theaters' musical theater and her church. She attended the Broadway Dreams Foundation's performing arts summer camp where she learned from Billy Porter, Stafford Arima, Tituss Burgess, and Otis Sallid.

== Career ==
=== Annie: professional stage debut ===
In summer 2013, Lewis auditioned in New York City to play Annie in the musical Annie on Broadway. She was selected as a finalist in a group of eight and did not get the role. While in New York, eight-year-old Lewis wanted to experience how it was like to make money as a street musician. Borrowing her mother's pinstriped flat cap, Lewis performed near Central Park and received $15 in tips within five minutes. Lewis played the title role in the musical Annie at the Atlanta Lyric Theatre in April 2014. The role was her professional theater debut. In a March 2014 interview with The Atlanta Journal-Constitution, Lewis said her favorite song in Annie is "Tomorrow" and that she dreamed of performing on Broadway in the musical Wicked. The Atlanta Journal-Constitution's theater reviewer Bert Osborne noted that young, amateur actresses playing Annie frequently are like a "Shirley Temple caricature" rather than a "real-life, hard-knock kid" owing to the character's "inherent preciousness". He noted, however, that Lewis "brings a natural charm and a relaxed assurance to the character that is genuinely believable". Rather than loudly singing the character's songs like many Annies who sound older than they are, Lewis sings them "simply, in the clear and lovely voice of the 9-year-old that she is", Osborne wrote.

=== Tuck Everlasting: Atlanta world premiere and Broadway debut ===
Lewis had not heard of the book Tuck Everlasting. Her brother was in another Atlanta theatrical performance, learned about the new musical Tuck Everlasting, and referred Lewis. Tuck Everlasting producers reached out to Lewis, asking her to do a tryout for Winnie Foster, the musical's main character. After her first audition, Lewis received a callback audition. She was selected to play Winnie Foster for Tuck Everlasting's world premiere at Atlanta's Alliance Theatre, beating out other actors in the nationwide competition. Directed by Casey Nicholaw, who had previously been involved in directing or choreographing the Broadway musicals Aladdin, The Drowsy Chaperone, Spamalot, and The Book of Mormon, the production ran from January to February 2015. Lewis was one of a small number of performers from Atlanta. Most of the show's performers were from New York City. The New York Times's Charles Isherwood praised Lewis' performance, writing that Winnie Foster was "played with a firm voice and natural spunk by Ms. Lewis".

After reading the children's novel Tuck Everlasting and watching the 2002 film adaptation, Lewis determined that if she were put in Winnie Foster's position of being able to drink the water that would grant eternal life, she would drink the water. But after preparing for the Winner Foster role, she told The Atlanta Journal-Constitution in 2015, "I am not so sure anymore. I want to live a normal life and have kids and grandkids." Lewis said she enjoyed being in Tuck Everlasting's world premiere because the script was malleable. Sometimes when she mistakenly added the word "And" or words that were not in the script, the scriptwriter would tell her, "Hey, I like that better", and revise the script. She told Broadway World, "Wow, I just created a line that will go down in history." During each car trip between her home and the theater, she would do vocal warmups. Just before the show, when a voice over the loudspeaker says, "The show will begin in one minute", Lewis would pray, "thanking God for this amazing opportunity and letting Him know He's guiding me in this show".

After beginning previews on March 31, 2016, Lewis made her official Broadway debut at Broadhurst Theatre in the role of Winnie Foster in Tuck Everlasting on April 26, 2016. While she was performing in the show, Lewis' plan was that she and a parent would live in a New York City apartment. Her mother and father would take turns: One would stay with her in New York and the other with her brother in Atlanta. The parents would then switch places. The production closed May 29, 2016, after 28 previews and 39 official shows. Tuck Everlasting sold tickets worth $325,361.28 instead of the possible $1,112,446 the week before the show closed. The New York Times's Michael Paulson found the show, which mostly received "tepid" reviews, to be a "Broadway flop" because it did not have huge stars and it was a fairy tale, which is "often hard to execute" because "[a]dults perceived it as a show for children, and family shows without the Disney imprimatur are hard to sell."

Critics gave Lewis' performance on Broadway mostly positive reviews. Chicago Tribune drama critic Chris Jones praised Lewis as being a "spunky young actress" who is "one of the show's great assets" and who "deftly carries pretty much the whole show". The Washington Post's chief theater critic Peter Marks lauded Lewis for being "technically accomplished, with a strong, clear voice and the fortitude necessary to carry the central role in a Broadway show". The New York Times theater critic Charles Isherwood wrote that Winnie Foster is "played by Ms. Lewis with winning spunk that (miraculously) never cloys".

== Awards and nominations ==
Lewis received two Suzi Bass Award nominations for "Best Leading Actress in a Musical". She was the youngest Suzi Bass Award nominee for the category for her depiction of Annie in the musical Annie at the Atlanta Lyric Theatre. The second nomination was for her portrayal of Winnie Foster in the musical Tuck Everlasting at the Alliance Theatre. She won the 2013 "Junior Miss Access Broadway" Triple Threat National Award. For her "Outstanding Broadway Debut Performance" in Tuck Everlasting in 2016, she won a Theatre World Award. She was nominated for the Shuler Hensley Award for "Best Performance by a Leading Actress" in 2020 for her role in Chicago at Milton High School.

== Personal life ==
Lewis lived in Milton, Georgia, and attended Crabapple Crossing Elementary. During her Tuck Everlasting stint at the Alliance Theatre in 2015, she had a tutor at the theater to allow her to both rehearse and be taught academic material. On her last day in fifth grade before she moved to New York for Tuck Everlasting, her classmates made her a sign saying "Goodbye Broadway Star!" While she was in New York, Lewis received her curriculum from an Atlanta public school that focuses on distance education, and her producers paid for a tutor who worked with every child in the production. Lewis attends Northwestern University in Evanston, Illinois. Her classmates include Gabrielle Gutierrez.
