= Tuck Everlasting (novel) =

1975 American children's fantasy novel by Natalie Babbitt

- First edition with Babbitt illustration
- Author: Natalie Babbitt
- Language: English
- Genre: Children's fantasy novel, drama
- Publisher: Farrar, Straus and Giroux
- Publication date: 1975
- Publication place: United States
- Media type: Print (hardcover)
- Pages: 139
- ISBN: 9780374480127
- LC Class: PZ7.B1135 Tu

Tuck Everlasting is an American children's novel about immortality written by Natalie Babbitt and published by Farrar, Straus and Giroux in 1975. It has sold over 5 million copies and has been called a classic of modern children's literature. The story follows a girl's meeting with a family of immortal humans.

Tuck Everlasting has been adapted into two feature films, released in 1981 and 2002, and has been adapted three times into unabridged audio books: by Listening Library/Random House in 1988 and narrated by Peter Thomas, by Recorded Books in 1993 and narrated by Barbara Caruso, and by Audio Bookshelf in 2001 and narrated by Melissa Hughes. It has also been adapted into a stage musical with music by Chris Miller, lyrics by Nathan Tysen, and book by Claudia Shear and Tim Federle.

== Plot summary ==
In 1880, 10 year-old Winifred Foster, who lives at the edge of the American village of Treegap, thinks about running away from her overbearing family. That evening, a man in a yellow suit approaches the Foster home, looking for information. Meanwhile, Winnie, the man, and Winnie's grandmother hear a music box playing deep in the woods near the Fosters' house.

The next morning, Winnie explores the wood. While the Fosters own the area, they never enter it. She sees a young man, Jesse Tuck, drink from a small spring. When she asks his age, he first says he's 104 years old, then changes his answer to seventeen. Winnie wants to drink from the spring, but Jesse stops her. When she mentions her father, Jesse becomes scared she will tell him about the spring. Jesse's mother Mae and brother Miles arrive. They seize Winnie, taking her to their home and pleading with her not to be scared. On the road, they pass the man in the yellow suit.

The Tucks explain that, 87 years ago, they had passed through the wood while looking for land to farm. They drank from the spring. After twenty years, the Tucks realized they were not aging. Miles's wife left him, taking their son and daughter. Forced to leave their farm, the Tucks returned in the direction of Treegap. After seeing that the clearing around the spring had not changed in twenty years, the Tucks realized that the spring had made them immortal.

Winnie quickly grows fond of the Tucks. Angus, patriarch of the family, explains that he wants to grow old but can't. He asks her to keep the Tucks' secret, saying that if others found out about the spring, they would drink from it and later regret their immortality. That evening, Jesse proposes that after Winnie turns seventeen, she drink from the spring and live eternally with him.

The man in the yellow suit steals the Tucks' horse and rides to the Fosters' home. He tells them that the Tucks have kidnapped Winnie and promises to rescue her in exchange for the Fosters' wood. He directs the constable to the Tucks' home, then rides ahead to meet the Tucks alone. He tells the Tucks that his grandmother had a friend who left her husband, taking their son and daughter, because the husband had not aged in twenty years. The ageless husband's mother had owned a music box. The man in the yellow suit had learned the music box's tune from his grandmother, who had learned it from her friend. Two nights ago, the man had heard the same tune coming from the Fosters' wood, where Mae had played it on her music box. He had followed the Tucks and eavesdropped to hear their story. Now, with legal possession of the wood and spring, he plans to sell the spring water to "people who deserve it. And it will be very, very expensive."

The man in the yellow suit offers to pay the Tucks to publicly demonstrate their invincibility. Angus angrily refuses. The man drags Winnie outside. He announces that after she drinks the water, demonstrations with her will do just as well. Mae grabs Angus's shotgun by the barrel and, despite Miles trying to stop her, swings the gun at the man with the yellow suit; just as the constable arrives, Mae lands what will prove to be a fatal blow to the man's head.

Winnie tells the constable that the Tucks are her friends, not her kidnappers. The constable takes Winnie home and locks Mae in the village jail; when word reaches the jail that the man in the yellow suit has succumbed to his injury, Mae is scheduled to be hanged for killing him. The Tucks and Winnie realize that attempting to execute Mae will reveal the Tucks' secret.

The following evening, Jesse visits Winnie. He explains that Miles has a plan to break Mae out of jail. He gives her a bottle of water from the spring and asks her to drink it when she turns seventeen. Winnie volunteers to help Mae escape. At midnight, Winnie and the Tucks go to jail. Miles pries the window out of Mae's cell, and Winnie exchanges places with Mae. In the dark, the constable mistakes Winnie for Mae. He does not realize until morning that Mae has escaped, and by then the Tucks are gone.

Infuriated, the constable yells at Winnie for committing a crime, and that if she was older, he would've kept her there. Winnie is not given a direct punishment as she is too young to be punished by law.

Two weeks pass. Winnie sees a toad threatened by a dog. She snatches up the toad and pours the water from Jesse's bottle over it.

Decades later in 1950, Mae and Angus Tuck return to Treegap. At a diner, the couple learns that the wood was struck by lightning and burned in 1947. It was bulldozed, and now a gas station stands on the site. In town, Angus finds Winnie's grave in a local cemetery revealing that she died in 1948 at the age of 78 and was married with grandchildren. He feels proud of her. As they leave the town, they see a toad squatting on the road. Angus moves it to the side of the road, commenting that it must think it's going to live forever. The family moves on from Treegap forever.

== Characters ==
- Winifred Foster – The novel's protagonist, she is 10 years old when the novel begins and lives in Treegap. Her family is the oldest family in Treegap. She grows to love the Tuck family and has a crush on Jesse Tuck.
- Angus Tuck – The father of the Tuck children, he dislikes his immortality and dreams of dying and going to heaven.
- Mae Tuck – The mother of the Tuck children, married to Angus. She is happy with her lifestyle, wearing old clothes and living in a messy house.
- Jesse Tuck – The youngest in his family, Jesse is 104 years old but physically appears to be seventeen. Though he enjoys immortality, he is lonely, so he asks Winnie to drink the water when she is 17 so she can marry him.
- Miles Tuck – Appearing to be 22 years old, Miles is the older brother of Jesse (having five years more than him, Miles, actually, should be 109 years old) and the first son of Angus and Mae. He is trained as a carpenter and blacksmith. His wife divorced him because she believed that he must have sold his soul to the devil to have maintained his youthful appearance after they had been married for almost 20 years.
- The Man In The Yellow Suit - The Man In The Yellow Suit attempts to find Winnie and return her in exchange for the Fosters' wood. When he tries to retrieve Winnie, Mae hits him with the end of a gun, and he is dead the next day due to his injuries.
- Betsy Foster - The mother of Winnie
- Robert Foster - The father of Winnie
- Grandmother - The grandmother of Winnie

== Awards and recognition ==
Tuck Everlasting has received awards including the Janusz Korczak Medal and the 1976 Christopher Award as best book for young people. It was named an ALA Notable Book and included on the Horn Book Magazine Fanfare List. In 2005 it was covered by Anita Silvey in The 100 Best Books for Children. Based on a 2007 online poll, the National Education Association listed it as one of its "Teachers' Top 100 Books for Children." It was ranked number 16 among the "Top 100 Chapter Books" of all time in a 2012 survey published by School Library Journal. The Broadway musical received a Tony Award nomination for Gregg Barnes in the category of Best Costume Design of A Musical for the 2015–2016 season.

== Adaptations ==
The novel has twice been adapted to film, and a musical. The first was released in 1981 and distributed by One Pass Media. The second, by Disney in 2002, was directed by Jay Russell and starred Alexis Bledel as Winnie, Jonathan Jackson as Jesse, William Hurt as Angus, Sissy Spacek as Mae, and Ben Kingsley as the man in the yellow suit. It received mixed but generally favorable reviews and currently (October 2025) holds a 61% rating at Rotten Tomatoes. The New York Post praised it as 'handsomely crafted and well-acted'. It grossed a little over $19 million at the domestic box office and was not widely released in foreign territories.

The novel has been adapted into a stage musical with music by Chris Miller, lyrics by Nathan Tysen, and book by Claudia Shear and Tim Federle. It was originally scheduled for a pre-Broadway run at Boston's Colonial Theatre, in June 2013, but plans were abandoned due to a lack of available theatres in New York. It was produced at the Alliance Theatre in Atlanta, in January and February 2015, directed and choreographed by Casey Nicholaw. The musical began previews on Broadway, on March 31, 2016, at the Broadhurst Theatre, opening on April 26, 2016, and closing a month later, on May 29. Carolee Carmello and Andrew Keenan-Bolger played Mae and Jesse, with Robert Lenzi (Miles), Michael Park (Angus), Terrence Mann (Man in the Yellow Suit), Fred Applegate (Constable Joe), Michael Wartella (Hugo), Valerie Wright (Betsy Foster), and Sarah Charles Lewis as Winnie.
