= John A. Willis =

John Alvin Willis (October 16, 1916 – June 25, 2010) was an American theatre and film book editor, theatre awards producer, actor, and educator. He is best known for editing the long-running annual publications Theatre World and Screen World, and for producing the annual Theatre World Awards for Broadway and Off-Broadway debuts for over forty years, from the early 1960s to the early 2000s.

== Personal life ==
Mr. Willis was originally from Morristown, Tennessee and graduated from Morristown High School in 1934. He earned an undergraduate degree in English from Milligan College, and did graduate work at Harvard University, Indiana University, and the University of Tennessee. During World War II, he served in the United States Naval Reserve where he was stationed in Enewetak Atoll, Marshall Islands, in the South Pacific. He rose to the rank of lieutenant junior grade. Mr. Willis was an English teacher with New York Public School System for over twenty years and retired in 1976. He was a member of Actors' Equity Association for over fifty years.

Willis died at age 93 on June 25, 2010, in his Manhattan home, of complications from lung cancer.

== Achievements as an entertainment historian ==
Willis was editor in chief of both Theatre World and its companion series Screen World for forty-three years. Theatre World and Screen World are the oldest definitive pictorial and statistical records of each American theatrical and foreign and domestic film season, and are referenced daily by industry professionals, students, and historians worldwide.

=== Theatre World ===
Theatre World, founded in 1945, covers the complete statistical and photographic Broadway, Off-Broadway, Off-Off-Broadway, and regional theatre seasons, major theatrical awards, obituaries, and the longest Broadway and Off-Broadway runs, among other categories. Ben Hodges is the current editor of Theatre World.

==== Theatre World Awards ====
From 1945 until the early 2000s, Mr. Willis presided over the annual Theatre World Awards. The awards hold the distinction of being the first to recognize Outstanding Debut in a Broadway or Off-Broadway Role; the first honorees were Barbara Bel Geddes and Marlon Brando. Over the years, Mr. Willis regularly oversaw and attended the ceremonies, and personally presented the Debut Award to such diverse talents as Warren Beatty, Jennifer Holliday, and John Leguizamo. As such, Willis has long provided encouragement to newcomers in a challenging industry. As the Theatre World Award is often the very first professional award for most honorees, the New York theatre community holds it in high regard.

Willis was instrumental in the establishment of TWA's nonprofit status in 1997. The awards are currently chosen by a committee of New York Drama Critics and hosted by Peter Filichia.

=== Screen World ===
Screen World, founded in 1949, documents, maintains statistics and includes photographs from almost every film produced and/or released in the United States. It includes obituaries, Academy Award nominees and winners. Barry Monush is the current editor.

=== Theatre World / Screen World archive ===
Mr. Willis also founded the Theatre World / Screen World archive, widely considered to be the most complete privately held theatrical pictorial and statistical archive on twentieth century theatre and film, including complete press kits, publicity information, advertisements, all reviews, publicity photographs, and even ticket stubs, from nearly every Broadway and Off-Broadway production between 1950 and 2000, as well as much of the same from Off-Off-Broadway and regional theatre productions. And because of Mr. Willis's personal interest in performers, he amassed a collection of tens of thousands of photographs of performers from the twentieth century, many collected directly from the performers themselves, signed, and incredibly rare. Mr. Willis favorably responded to all inquiries for the loan of materials from the archive, and organizations such as the Actors Studio and Vanity Fair have used his photographs for tributes and articles. He has also been responsible for many annual deposits of his collected photographs and statistical information on films to the Institute of the American Musical, in Los Angeles, California.

=== Other performing arts publications ===
Mr. Willis also served as editor of the Dance World and Opera World series, the landmark A Pictorial History of the American Theatre 1860–1985. Previously, he served as assistant to Theatre World founder Daniel Blum on Great Stars of the American Stage, Great Stars of Film, A Pictorial History of the Talkies, A Pictorial History of Television, A Pictorial Treasury of Opera in America, and A Pictorial History of the Silent Screen.

== Awards ==
On behalf of Theatre World and/or Screen World, Mr. Willis received a Special 2001 Tony Award for "Excellence in the Theatre" and the 2003 Broadway Theatre Institute Lifetime Achievement Award, in addition to having received a Drama Desk Award, a Lucille Lortel Award, and the National Board of Review William K. Everson Award, as well awards from Marquis Who's Who Publications Board, in which he has been consistently listed among luminaries in Who's Who in America, Who's Who in the World, Who's Who in Entertainment, and Who's Who in the East, for well over twenty years. He served on the nominating committees for the Tony Awards and the New York University Hall of Fame, and was on the national board of the University of Tennessee Clarence Brown Theatre. In 2007, he was honored by his alma mater, Milligan College, when they dedicated the John Willis Wing of the new Gregory Center for Liberal Arts.
