= Matthew Murray (writer) =

American theatre critic and technology writer (born 1976)

- Born: June 10, 1976 (age 49); Bellingham, Washington, US
- Occupations: Theatre critic, writer
- Years active: 2001–present

Matthew Murray (born June 10, 1976) is an American theatre critic and technology writer, best known for his reviews of New York theater on TalkinBroadway.com and his articles for the Ziff-Davis family of computer magazines. He is a nominator for the Theater World Awards and at one time also for the Drama Desk Awards.

== Early life and education ==
Murray grew up in Bellingham, Washington, where he became interested in computers and technology. He studied Theatre Arts at Washington State University before transferring to Western Washington University, where he earned a BA in Dramatic Writing.

== Career ==
Murray moved to New York City in 2000, when he began writing for TalkinBroadway.com. His first review was a pan of Theresa Rebeck's Spike Heels. In 2002, Murray also joined BroadwayStars.com as an editor and columnist.

The same year, Murray joined the Drama Desk, sitting on the nominating committee for the Drama Desk Awards in the 2005–2006 season. Murray spoke out questioning the Drama Desk leadership, and was removed from the Drama Desk's email group. He created his own group called Drama Desk Uncensored. He was eventually readmitted to the group's listserve.

Murray was an associate editor of TheaterMania.com from 2002 to 2005, during which time he contributed to 'The Theatermania Guide to Musical Theater Recordings'. In 2004 and 2005, he hosted with Peter Filichia the live theatre discussion show Bitch or Brag About Broadway at New York's 45th Street Theatre. In 2005 Murray became a senior editor of Stage Directions Magazine, the same year he joined the nominating committee for the Theatre World Award. In 2006, Murray began added technology to his writing portfolio, taking a position as senior editor at Computer Shopper in 2006.

When Computer Shopper ceased publication in 2009, Murray joined Ziff-Davis, where he has written about a variety of technology topics for several of the publisher's magazines and web publications.
