= Mother Play =

2024 play by Paula Vogel

- Written by: Paula Vogel
- Characters: Phyllis; Carl; Martha
- Original language: English
- Genre: Drama
- Setting: Washington, D.C., 1962

Premiere
- Date premiered: April 3, 2024
- Place premiered: Hayes Theater

Mother Play – A Play in Five Evictions is a dramatic stage play written by American playwright Paula Vogel. The play debuted on Broadway at the Hayes Theater on April 25, 2024, as part of Second Stage Theater's 2023–2024 season starring Jessica Lange, Celia Keenan-Bolger, and Jim Parsons.

== Synopsis ==
Phyllis, a hardheaded matriarch, attempts to guide the direction of her children's lives as they move into a new apartment in Washington, D.C.

== Cast and characters ==
Character	Broadway 2024
Phyllis	Jessica Lange
Carl	Jim Parsons
Martha	Celia Keenan-Bolger

== Production history ==
The play was announced in 2023 to make its world debut as part of Second Stage Theater's 2023–2024 Broadway season, directed by Tina Landau. Previews were held from April 3, 2024, and the play officially opened on April 25, 2024. With a limited run, the play closed on June 16, 2024. The set was designed by David Zinn and costumes by Toni-Leslie James.

The Melbourne Theatre Company staged the play's Australian premiere in June 2025, with Sigrid Thornton as Phyllis, Yael Stone as Martha, and Ash Flanders as Carl, directed by Lee Lewis.

The Shakespeare & Company will feature Mother Play from August 29, 2025 until October 5, 2025 at the Elayne P. Bernstein Theatre in Lenox, Massachusetts.

The Studio Theatre in Washington, DC staged The Mother Play from November 12, 2025 through January 4, 2026. It was directed by Margot Bordelon and featured Stanley Bahorek as Carl, Kate Eastwood Norris as Phyllis, and Zoe Mann as Martha.

== Accolades ==
=== 2024 Broadway debut ===
Year	Award	Category	Nominee	Result	Ref.
2024	Tony Awards	Best Play	Paula Vogel	Nominated	
2024	Tony Awards	Best Actress in a Play	Jessica Lange	Nominated	
2024	Tony Awards	Best Featured Actor in a Play	Jim Parsons	Nominated	
2024	Tony Awards	Best Featured Actress in a Play	Celia Keenan-Bolger	Nominated	
2024	Drama Desk Awards	Outstanding Play	Mother Play	Nominated	
2024	Drama Desk Awards	Outstanding Lead Performance in a Play	Jessica Lange	Won	
2024	Drama Desk Awards	Outstanding Featured Performance in a Play	Celia Keenan-Bolger	Won	
2024	Drama League Award	Outstanding Production of a Play	Mother Play	Nominated	
2024	Drama League Award	Distinguished Performance	Jessica Lange	Nominated	
2024	Drama League Award	Distinguished Performance	Jim Parsons	Nominated	
2024	Outer Critics Circle Awards	Outstanding New Broadway Play	Paula Vogel	Nominated	
2024	Outer Critics Circle Awards	Outstanding Lead Performer in a Broadway Play	Jessica Lange	Won	
2024	Outer Critics Circle Awards	Outstanding Featured Performer in a Broadway Play	Celia Keenan-Bolger	Nominated	
2024	Outer Critics Circle Awards	Outstanding Featured Performer in a Broadway Play	Jim Parsons	Nominated	
