= Theatre World Award =

American award

The Theatre World Award is an American honor presented annually to actors and actresses in recognition of an outstanding New York City stage debut performance, either on Broadway or off-Broadway. It was first awarded for the 1945–1946 theatre season.

== History ==
In 1944, the Theatre World Awards were founded by Daniel Blum, Norman McDonald, and John Willis, recognizing "Promising Personalities", actors and actresses, in debut performances, in Broadway or Off-Broadway productions. In the first year Blum presented the awards in his apartment, at a cocktail party, to Betty Comden, Judy Holliday and John Raitt, and the second year to Barbara Bel Geddes, Marlon Brando, and Burt Lancaster. At Blum's 1949 party, Carol Channing won. The Theatre World editorial staff administered the Awards, under the supervision of Daniel Blum.

In 1964, after Daniel Blum's death, John Willis supervised the Awards. In 1969, the award was renamed the Theatre World Award. The early awards were a framed certificate, then a plaque, later in 1973, the bronze Janus Award, sculpted by Harry Marinsky. In 1998, the Theatre World Awards were incorporated as a 501 (c) 3 nonprofit organization and are currently overseen by a board of directors independent of Theatre World.

Winners are selected by a committee of New York-based critics. That committee includes (as of May 2015) Roma Torre (NY1), David Cote (Time Out7 New York, NY1), Joe Dziemianowicz (New York Daily News), Peter Filichia (The Newark Star-Ledger, Eme^{7}6ritus), Harry Haun (Playbill), Matthew Murray (TalkinBroadway.com), and Frank Scheck (New York Post).

== Special honorary awards ==
The Dorothy Loudon Starbaby Award was instituted in 2009, named in honor of actress and singer Dorothy Loudon (1925–2003) and since 2010 has been awarded by the Dorothy Loudon Foundation in connection with these awards. The first Starbaby Award was presented to Susan Louise O'Connor (Blithe Spirit). Other recipients are Bobby Steggert (Ragtime and Yank!) (2009–10), Seth Numrich (War Horse) (2010–11), and Susan Pourfar (Tribes). In 2013, it was renamed Dorothy Loudon Award for Excellence in the Theater.

The first annual Lunt–Fontanne Award for Ensemble Excellence was presented at the 2010–11 Awards, to the cast of The Motherf**ker with the Hat – Bobby Cannavale, Chris Rock, Annabella Sciorra, Elizabeth Rodriguez and Yul Vázquez. The award is in honor of the late Alfred Lunt and Lynn Fontanne and is presented to an outstanding Broadway or Off-Broadway ensemble. In 2022 an award for "Outstanding Ensemble" was presented to the 21 cast members making their Broadway debuts in the revival of The Music Man.

== John Willis Award ==
A new award, the John Willis Award, was first instituted for the 2012–13 season. It is given for "lifetime achievement in the theatre" to honor John Willis who created and maintained the Theatre World tradition for 66 years, encouraging new talent in an often challenging business." The first recipient was Alan Alda.

== The award ceremony ==
The winners for the 2010–11 season were announced on May 10, 2011, with a ceremony held on June 7; the awards are traditionally presented by former award winners. The awards for the 2011–11 season were announced on May 8, 2012, and presented at a ceremony held on June 5, 2012, at the Belasco Theatre.

The awards for the 2012–13 season were announced on May 7, 2013, and the 69th Annual Theatre World Awards Ceremony was held on June 3 at the Music Box Theater. The awards for the 2013–14 season were announced on May 6, 2014, and the ceremony was held on June 2, 2014, at Circle in the Square. The awards for the 2014–15 season were announced on May 5, 2015; the ceremony was held on June 1, 2015, at the Lyric Theatre.

== Award winners ==
Past recipients, from 1990–1991 to 2024–2025

=== 1990–1991 ===
- Jane Adams – I Hate Hamlet
- Gillian Anderson – Absent Friends
- Adam Arkin – I Hate Hamlet
- Brenda Blethyn – Absent Friends
- Marcus Chong – Stand-up Tragedy
- Paul Hipp – Buddy
- LaChanze – Once on This Island
- Kenny Neal – Mule Bone
- Kevin Ramsey – Oh, Kay!
- Francis Ruivivar – Shogun, The Musical
- Lea Salonga – Miss Saigon
- Chandra Wilson – The Good Times Are Killing Me
- Tracey Ullman – The Big Love and The Taming of the Shrew
- Special Award: Ellen Stewart

=== 1991–1992 ===
- Talia Balsam – Jake's Women
- Lindsay Crouse – The Homecoming
- Griffin Dunne – Search and Destroy
- Laurence Fishburne – Two Trains Running
- Mel Harris – Empty Hearts
- Jonathan Kaplan – Falsettos and Rags
- Jessica Lange – A Streetcar Named Desire
- Laura Linney – Sight Unseen
- Spiro Malas – The Most Happy Fella
- Mark Rosenthal – Marvin's Room
- Helen Shaver – Jake's Women
- Al White – Two Trains Running
- Special Award: cast of Dancing at Lughnasa
- Special Award: Plays for Living

=== 1992–1993 ===
- Brent Carver – Kiss of the Spider Woman
- Michael Cerveris – The Who's Tommy
- Marcia Gay Harden – Angels in America: Millennium Approaches
- Stephanie Lawrence – Blood Brothers
- Andrea Martin – My Favorite Year
- Liam Neeson – Anna Christie
- Stephen Rea – Someone Who'll Watch Over Me
- Natasha Richardson – Anna Christie
- Martin Short – The Goodbye Girl
- Dina Spybey – Five Women Wearing the Same Dress
- Stephen Spinella – Angels in America: Millennium Approaches
- Jennifer Tilly – One Shoe Off
- Special Award: John Leguizamo
- Special Award: Rosetta LeNoire

=== 1993–1994 ===
- Marcus D'Amico – An Inspector Calls
- Jarrod Emick – Damn Yankees
- Arabella Field – Snowing at Delphi and Four Dogs and a Bone
- Aden Gillett – An Inspector Calls
- Sherry Glaser – Family Secrets
- Michael Hayden – Carousel
- Margaret Illman – The Red Shoes
- Audra Ann McDonald – Carousel
- Burke Moses – Beauty and the Beast
- Anna Deavere Smith – Twilight: Los Angeles, 1992
- Jere Shea – Passion
- Harriet Walter – Three Birds Alighting on a Field

=== 1994–1995 ===
- Gretha Boston – Show Boat
- Billy Crudup – Arcadia
- Ralph Fiennes – Hamlet
- Beverly D'Angelo – Simpatico
- Calista Flockhart – The Glass Menagerie
- Kevin Kilner – The Glass Menagerie
- Anthony LaPaglia – The Rose Tattoo
- Julie Johnson – Das Barbecü
- Helen Mirren – A Month in the Country
- Jude Law – Indiscretions
- Rufus Sewell – Translations
- Vanessa Williams – Kiss of the Spider Woman
- Special Award: Brooke Shields

=== 1995–1996 ===
- Jordan Baker – Suddenly Last Summer
- Joohee Choi – The King and I
- Karen Kay Cody – Master Class
- Viola Davis – Seven Guitars
- Kate Forbes – The School for Scandal
- Michael McGrath – Swinging on a Star
- Alfred Molina – Molly Sweeney
- Timothy Olyphant – The Monogamist
- Adam Pascal – Rent
- Lou Diamond Phillips – The King and I
- Daphne Rubin-Vega – Rent
- Brett Tabisel – Big
- Special Award: cast of An Ideal Husband

=== 1996–1997 ===
- Terry Beaver – The Last Night of Ballyhoo
- Helen Carey – London Assurance
- Kristin Chenoweth – Steel Pier
- Jason Danieley – Candide
- Linda Eder – Jekyll & Hyde
- Allison Janney – Present Laughter
- Daniel McDonald – Steel Pier
- Janet McTeer – A Doll's House
- Mark Ruffalo – This Is Our Youth
- Fiona Shaw – The Waste Land
- Antony Sher – Stanley
- Alan Tudyk – Bunny Bunny
- Special Award: cast of Skylight

=== 1997–1998 ===
- Max Casella – The Lion King
- Margaret Colin – Jackie
- Ruaidhri Conroy – The Cripple of Inishmaan
- Alan Cumming – Cabaret
- Lea DeLaria – On the Town
- Edie Falco – Side Man
- Enid Graham – Honour
- Anna Kendrick – High Society
- Ednita Nazario – The Capeman
- Douglas Sills – The Scarlet Pimpernel
- Steven Sutcliffe – Ragtime
- Sam Trammell – Ah, Wilderness!
- Special Award: Eddie Izzard
- Special Award: cast of The Beauty Queen of Leenane

=== 1998–1999 ===
- Jillian Armenante – The Cider House Rules
- James Black – Not About Nightingales
- Brendan Coyle – The Weir
- Anna Friel – Closer
- Rupert Graves – Closer
- Lynda Gravatt – The Old Settler
- Nicole Kidman – The Blue Room
- Ciaran Hinds – Closer
- Ute Lemper – Chicago
- Clarke Peters – The Iceman Cometh
- Toby Stephens – Ring Round the Moon
- Sandra Oh – Stop Kiss
- Special Award: Jerry Herman

=== 1999–2000 ===
- Craig Bierko – The Music Man
- Everett Bradley – Swing!
- Gabriel Byrne – A Moon for the Misbegotten
- Ann Hampton Callaway – Swing!
- Toni Collette – The Wild Party
- Henry Czerny – Arms and the Man
- Stephen Dillane – The Real Thing
- Jennifer Ehle – The Real Thing
- Philip Seymour Hoffman – True West
- Hayley Mills – Suite in Two Keys
- Cigdem Onat – The Time of the Cuckoo
- Claudia Shear – Dirty Blonde
- Special Award: Barry Humphries

=== 2000–2001 ===
- Juliette Binoche – Betrayal
- Macaulay Culkin – Madame Melville
- Janie Dee – Comic Potential
- Raúl Esparza – The Rocky Horror Show
- Kathleen Freeman – The Full Monty
- Deven May – Bat Boy
- Reba McEntire – Annie Get Your Gun
- Chris Noth – The Best Man
- Joshua Park – The Adventures of Tom Sawyer
- Rosie Perez – References to Salvador Dali Make Me Hot
- Joely Richardson – Madame Melville
- John Ritter – The Dinner Party
- Special Award: Seán Campion
- Special Award: Conleth Hill

=== 2001–2002 ===
- Justin Bohon – Oklahoma!
- Simon Callow – The Mystery of Charles Dickens
- Mos Def – Topdog/Underdog
- Emma Fielding – Private Lives
- Adam Godley – Private Lives
- Martin Jarvis – By Jeeves
- Spencer Kayden – Urinetown
- Gretchen Mol – The Shape of Things
- Anna Paquin – The Glory of Living
- Louise Pitre – Mamma Mia!
- David Warner – Major Barbara
- Rachel Weisz – The Shape of Things

=== 2002–2003 ===
- Antonio Banderas – Nine
- Tammy Blanchard – Gypsy
- Thomas Jefferson Byrd – Ma Rainey's Black Bottom
- Jonathan Cake – Medea
- Victoria Hamilton – A Day in the Death of Joe Egg
- Clare Higgins – Vincent in Brixton
- Jackie Hoffman – Hairspray
- Mary Stuart Masterson – Nine
- John Selya – Movin' Out
- Jochum ten Haaf – Vincent in Brixton
- Daniel Sunjata – Take Me Out
- Marissa Jaret Winokur – Hairspray
- Special Award: Peter Filichia
- Special Award: Ben Hodges

=== 2003–2004 ===
- Shannon Cochran – Bug
- Stephanie D'Abruzzo – Avenue Q
- Mitchel David Federan – The Boy From Oz
- Alexander Gemignani – Assassins
- Hugh Jackman – The Boy From Oz
- Isabel Keating – The Boy From Oz
- Sanaa Lathan – A Raisin in the Sun
- Jefferson Mays – I Am My Own Wife
- Euan Morton – Taboo
- Anika Noni Rose – Caroline, or Change
- John Tartaglia – Avenue Q
- Jennifer Westfeldt – Wonderful Town
- Special Award: Sarah Jones

=== 2004–2005 ===
- Christina Applegate – Sweet Charity
- Ashlie Atkinson – Fat Pig
- Hank Azaria – Spamalot
- Gordon Clapp – Glengarry Glen Ross
- Conor Donovan – Privilege
- Dan Fogler – The 25th Annual Putnam County Spelling Bee
- Heather Goldenhersh – Doubt
- Carla Gugino – After the Fall
- Jenn Harris – Modern Orthodox
- Cheyenne Jackson – All Shook Up
- Celia Keenan-Bolger – The 25th Annual Putnam County Spelling Bee
- Tyler Maynard – Altar Boyz

=== 2005–2006 ===
- Harry Connick, Jr. – The Pajama Game
- Felicia P. Fields – The Color Purple
- Maria Friedman – The Woman in White
- Richard Griffiths – The History Boys
- Mamie Gummer – Mr. Marmalade
- Jayne Houdyshell – Well
- Bob Martin – The Drowsy Chaperone
- Ian McDiarmid – Faith Healer
- Nellie McKay – The Threepenny Opera
- David Wilmot – The Lieutenant of Inishmore
- Elisabeth Withers-Mendes – The Color Purple
- John Lloyd Young – Jersey Boys

=== 2006–2007 ===
- Fantasia Barrino – The Color Purple
- Eve Best – A Moon for the Misbegotten
- Mary Birdsong – Martin Short: Fame Becomes Me
- Erin Davie – Grey Gardens
- Xanthe Elbrick – Coram Boy
- Johnny Galecki – The Little Dog Laughed
- Jonathan Groff – Spring Awakening
- Gavin Lee – Mary Poppins
- Lin-Manuel Miranda – In the Heights
- Bill Nighy – The Vertical Hour
- Stark Sands – Journey's End
- Nilaja Sun – No Child...
- Special Award: Actors' Fund

=== 2007–2008 ===
- De'Adre Aziza – Passing Strange
- Cassie Beck – Drunken City
- Daniel Breaker – Passing Strange
- Ben Daniels – Les Liaisons Dangereuses
- Deanna Dunagan – August: Osage County
- Hoon Lee – Yellow Face
- Alli Mauzey – Cry-Baby
- Jenna Russell – Sunday in the Park with George
- Mark Rylance – Boeing-Boeing
- Loretta Ables Sayre – South Pacific
- Jimmi Simpson – The Farnsworth Invention
- Paulo Szot – South Pacific

=== 2008–2009 ===
- David Alvarez/Trent Kowalik/Kiril Kulish – Billy Elliot, The Musical
- Chad L. Coleman – Joe Turner's Come and Gone
- Jennifer Grace – Our Town
- Josh Grisetti – Enter Laughing, The Musical
- Haydn Gwynne – Billy Elliot, The Musical
- Colin Hanks – 33 Variations
- Marin Ireland – reasons to be pretty
- Susan Louise O'Connor – Blithe Spirit
- Condola Rashad – Ruined
- Geoffrey Rush – Exit the King
- Josefina Scaglione – West Side Story
- Wesley Taylor – Rock of Ages
- Dorothy Loudon Starbaby Award: Susan Louise O'Connor – Blithe Spirit
- Special Award: Amelia Bullmore, Jessica Hynes, Stephen Mangan, Ben Miles, Paul Ritter and Amanda Root – cast of The Norman Conquests

=== 2009–2010 ===
- Nina Arianda – Venus in Fur
- Chris Chalk – Fences
- Bill Heck – The Orphans' Home Cycle
- Jon Michael Hill – Superior Donuts
- Scarlett Johansson – A View from the Bridge
- Keira Keeley – The Glass Menagerie
- Sahr Ngaujah – Fela!
- Eddie Redmayne – Red
- Andrea Riseborough – The Pride
- Heidi Schreck – Circle Mirror Transformation
- Stephanie Umoh – Ragtime
- Michael Urie – The Temperamentals
- Dorothy Loudon Starbaby Award: Bobby Steggert – Ragtime and Yank!

=== 2010–2011 ===
- Ellen Barkin – The Normal Heart
- Desmin Borges – The Elaborate Entrance of Chad Deity
- Halley Feiffer – The House of Blue Leaves
- Grace Gummer – Arcadia
- Rose Hemingway – How to Succeed in Business Without Really Trying
- John Larroquette – How to Succeed in Business Without Really Trying
- Heather Lind – The Merchant of Venice
- Patina Miller – Sister Act
- Arian Moayed – Bengal Tiger at the Baghdad Zoo
- Jim Parsons – The Normal Heart
- Zachary Quinto – Angels in America: A Gay Fantasia on National Themes
- Tony Sheldon – Priscilla, Queen of the Desert
- Dorothy Loudon Starbaby Award: Seth Numrich – War Horse
- Lunt-Fontanne Award for Ensemble Excellence: cast of The Motherfucker with the Hat

=== 2011–2012 ===
- Tracie Bennett – End of the Rainbow
- Phillip Boykin – The Gershwins' Porgy and Bess
- Crystal A. Dickinson – Clybourne Park
- Russell Harvard – Tribes
- Jeremy Jordan – Bonnie & Clyde
- Joaquina Kalukango – Hurt Village
- Jennifer Lim – Chinglish
- Jessie Mueller – On a Clear Day You Can See Forever
- Hettienne Park – Seminar and The Intelligent Homosexual's Guide to Capitalism and Socialism with a Key to the Scriptures
- Chris Perfetti – Sons of the Prophet
- Finn Wittrock – Death of a Salesman
- Josh Young – Jesus Christ Superstar
- Dorothy Loudon Starbaby Award: Susan Pourfar – Tribes

=== 2012–2013 ===
- Bertie Carvel – Matilda the Musical
- Carrie Coon – Edward Albee's Who's Afraid of Virginia Woolf?
- Brandon J. Dirden – The Piano Lesson
- Shalita Grant – Vanya and Sonia and Masha and Spike
- Tom Hanks – Lucky Guy
- Valisia LeKae – Motown: The Musical
- Rob McClure – Chaplin
- Ruthie Ann Miles – Here Lies Love
- Conrad Ricamora – Here Lies Love
- Keala Settle – Hands on a Hardbody
- Yvonne Strahovski – Golden Boy
- Tom Sturridge – Orphans
- Dorothy Loudon Award for Excellence in the Theater: Johnny Orsini – The Nance
- John Willis Award for Lifetime Achievement in the Theatre: Alan Alda

=== 2013–2014 ===
- Paul Chahidi – Twelfth Night, or What You Will
- Nick Cordero – Bullets Over Broadway
- Bryan Cranston – All the Way
- Mary Bridget Davies – A Night with Janis Joplin
- Sarah Greene – The Cripple of Inishmaan
- Rebecca Hall – Machinal
- Ramin Karimloo – Les Misérables
- Zachary Levi – First Date
- Chris O'Dowd – Of Mice and Men
- Sophie Okonedo – A Raisin in the Sun
- Emerson Steele – Violet
- Lauren Worsham – A Gentleman's Guide to Love and Murder
- Dorothy Loudon Award for Excellence in the Theater: Celia Keenan-Bolger – The Glass Menagerie
- John Willis Award for Lifetime Achievement in the Theatre Winner: Christopher Plummer

=== 2014–2015 ===
- Geneva Carr – Hand to God
- Daveed Diggs – Hamilton
- Megan Fairchild – On the Town
- Robert Fairchild – An American in Paris
- Collin Kelly-Sordelet – The Last Ship
- Sydney Lucas – Fun Home
- Karen Pittman – Disgraced
- Benjamin Scheuer – The Lion
- Alex Sharp – The Curious Incident of the Dog in the Night-Time
- Emily Skeggs – Fun Home
- Micah Stock – It's Only a Play
- Ruth Wilson – Constellations
- Dorothy Loudon Award for Excellence in the Theater: Leanne Cope – An American In Paris
- John Willis Award for Lifetime Achievement in the Theatre: Chita Rivera

=== 2015–2016 ===
- Danielle Brooks – The Color Purple
- Carmen Cusack – Bright Star
- Khris Davis – The Royale
- Daniel Durant – Spring Awakening
- Cynthia Erivo – The Color Purple
- John Krasinski – Dry Powder
- Sarah Charles Lewis – Tuck Everlasting
- Austin P. McKenzie – Spring Awakening
- Lupita Nyong'o – Eclipsed
- Mark Strong – A View From The Bridge
- Ana Villafañe – On Your Feet!
- Ben Whishaw – The Crucible
- Dorothy Loudon Award for Excellence in the Theater: Nicholas Barasch – She Loves Me
- John Willis Award for Lifetime Achievement in the Theatre: Bernadette Peters

=== 2016–2017 ===
- Carlo Albán – Sweat
- Christy Altomare – Anastasia
- Denée Benton – Natasha, Pierre & The Great Comet of 1812
- Jon Jon Briones – Miss Saigon
- Barrett Doss – Groundhog Day
- Amber Gray – Natasha, Pierre & The Great Comet of 1812
- Josh Groban – Natasha, Pierre & The Great Comet of 1812
- Lucas Hedges – Yen
- Raymond Lee – Vietgone
- Eva Noblezada – Miss Saigon
- Jeremy Secomb – Sweeney Todd
- Cobie Smulders – Present Laughter
- Dorothy Loudon Award for Excellence in the Theater: Katrina Lenk, Indecent and The Band's Visit
- John Willis Award for Lifetime Achievement in the Theatre: Glenn Close
- Special Theatre World Award: Dave Malloy for his Broadway debut in Natasha, Pierre & the Great Comet of 1812 as an actor, composer, writer, lyricist, and orchestrator.

=== 2017–2018 ===
- Anthony Boyle – Harry Potter and the Cursed Child
- Jamie Brewer – Amy and the Orphans
- Noma Dumezweni – Harry Potter and the Cursed Child
- Johnny Flynn – Hangmen
- Denise Gough – Angels in America
- Harry Hadden-Paton – My Fair Lady
- Hailey Kilgore – Once on This Island
- James McArdle – Angels in America
- Lauren Ridloff – Children of a Lesser God
- Ethan Slater – SpongeBob SquarePants
- Charlie Stemp – Hello, Dolly!
- Katy Sullivan – Cost of Living
- Dorothy Loudon Award for Excellence in the Theater: Ben Edelman, Admissions
- John Willis Award for Lifetime Achievement in the Theatre: Victor Garber

=== 2018–2019 ===
- Gbenga Akinnagbe – To Kill a Mockingbird
- Tom Glynn-Carney – The Ferryman
- Sophia Anne Caruso – Beetlejuice
- Paddy Considine – The Ferryman
- James Davis – Oklahoma!
- Micaela Diamond – The Cher Show
- Bonnie Milligan – Head Over Heels
- Simone Missick – Paradise Blue
- Jeremy Pope – Choir Boy
- Colton Ryan – Girl from the North Country
- Stephanie Styles – Kiss Me, Kate
- Phoebe Waller-Bridge – Fleabag
- John Willis Award for Lifetime Achievement in the Theatre: Nathan Lane

=== 2021–2022 ===
- Patrick J. Adams – Take Me Out
- Yair Ben-Dor – Prayer for the French Republic
- Kearstin Piper-Brown – Intimate Apparel
- Sharon D Clarke – Caroline, or Change
- Enrico Colantoni – Birthday Candles
- Justin Cooley – Kimberly Akimbo
- Crystal Flynn – Birthday Candles
- Gaby French – Hangmen
- Myles Frost – MJ the Musical
- Jaquel Spivey – A Strange Loop
- Shannon Tyo – The Chinese Lady
- Kara Young – Clyde's
- Dorothy Loudon Award for Excellence in the Theater: Michael Oberholtzer, Take Me Out
- John Willis Award for Lifetime Achievement in the Theatre: Harvey Fierstein
- Outstanding Ensemble Award: the 21 cast members making their Broadway debut in The Music Man
  - Benjamin Pajak – The Music Man

=== 2022–2023 ===
- Yahya Abdul-Mateen II – Topdog/Underdog
- Hiran Abeysekera – Life of Pi
- Amir Arison – The Kite Runner
- D'Arcy Carden – The Thanksgiving Play
- Jodie Comer – Prima Facie
- Callum Francis – Kinky Boots
- Lucy Freyer – The Wanderers
- Caroline Innerbichler – Shucked
- Ashley D. Kelley – Shucked
- Casey Likes – Almost Famous
- Emma Pfitzler Price – Becomes a Woman
- John David Washington – The Piano Lesson
- Dorothy Loudon Award for Excellence in the Theater: Julie Benko, Funny Girl
- John Willis Award for Lifetime Achievement in the Theatre: Brian Stokes Mitchell
- Outstanding Contribution to the Theatre World: Dale Badway
- Outstanding Swing: Matilyn Caserta, Six

=== 2023–2024 ===
- Ali Louis Bourzgui – The Who's Tommy
- Cole Escola – Oh, Mary!
- Brody Grant – The Outsiders
- Michael Imperioli – An Enemy of the People
- Will Keen – Patriots
- Nichelle Lewis – The Wiz
- Rachel McAdams – Mary Jane
- Maleah Joi Moon – Hell's Kitchen
- Tom Pecinka – Stereophonic
- Sarah Pidgeon – Stereophonic
- Phillip Johnson Richardson – The Wiz
- Chris Stack – Stereophonic
- Dorothy Loudon Award for Excellence in the Theater: A.J. Shively, Philadelphia, Here I Come!
- John Willis Award for Lifetime Achievement in the Theatre: Len Cariou
- Outstanding Contribution to the Theatre World: Peter Filichia

=== 2024–2025 ===
- Alana Arenas – Purpose
- Kit Connor – Romeo & Juliet
- Patsy Ferran – A Streetcar Named Desire
- Tom Francis – Sunset Boulevard
- Jak Malone – Operation Mincemeat
- Paul Mescal – A Streetcar Named Desire
- Louis McCartney – Stranger Things: The First Shadow
- Marjan Neshat – English
- Jasmine Amy Rogers – Boop! The Musical
- Nicole Scherzinger – Sunset Boulevard
- Helen J. Shen – Maybe Happy Ending
- Sarah Snook – The Picture of Dorian Gray
- Dorothy Loudon Award for Excellence in the Theater: Shailene Woodley – Cult of Love
- John Willis Award for Lifetime Achievement in the Theatre: Leslie Uggams
- Special Award For Outstanding Broadway Debut Performer/Playwright: George Clooney – Good Night, and Good Luck

=== 2025–2026 ===
- Ben Ahlers – Death of a Salesman
- LJ Benet – The Lost Boys
- Madeline Brewer – Becky Shaw
- Adrien Brody – The Fear of 13
- Ayo Edebiri – Proof
- Alden Ehrenreich – Becky Shaw
- Luke Evans – The Rocky Horror Show
- Will Harrison – Punch
- River Lipe-Smith – Caroline
- Lesley Manville – Oedipus
- Robert "Silk" Mason – Cats: The Jellicle Ball
- Sam Tutty – Two Strangers (Carry a Cake Across New York)

== See also ==
- Tony Awards
- Drama Desk Awards
- Obie Awards
- Theatre World
