= Dirty Blonde (play) =

Play written by Claudia Shear

Dirty Blonde is a play by Claudia Shear. The play ran Off-Broadway and on Broadway in 2000. It involves two fans of Mae West who discover their shared passion for her, and for each other.

== Background ==
Conceived by Shear and James Lapine and featuring songs from I'm No Angel and She Done Him Wrong, it explores the phenomenon of the legendary Mae West, one of America's most enduring and controversial pop culture icons. The play, which draws its title from the West film quip "I made myself platinum, but I was born a dirty blonde", tells the story of Jo, an office temp and aspiring actress, and Charlie, who works in the New York Public Library's film archives, both lonely and obsessive West fans who meet at her grave and form a unique relationship as they swap stories about the career highlights and eventual decline into parody of the woman they worship.

== Productions ==
The play premiered Off-Broadway at the New York Theatre Workshop on January 10, 2000, running to February 13, 2000.

The play then opened on Broadway at the Helen Hayes Theatre on May 1, 2000 after previews from April 14 and closed on March 4, 2001 after 352 performances. The play was directed by James Lapine, with Shear as Jo/West and Kevin Chamberlin and Bob Stillman.

Kathy Najimy replaced Shear on January 9, 2001. Tom Riis Farrell replaced Chamberlin on July 6, 2000. Najimy reprised her role at the Old Globe Theatre in San Diego, California, in July to August 2003, along with original actors Chamberlin and Stillman.

Shear played the role in London, opening at the Duke of York's Theatre on June 16, 2004. Kevin Chamberlin and Bob Stillman reprised their roles also. It has been produced in by regional theatres throughout the United States. For example, it ran in Chicago in 2011 at the BoHo Theatre. The play ran in Los Angeles at the Pasadena Playhouse in 2004, with Shear reprising her role. In 2023, Cady Huffman starred in a production at CV Rep, in Cathedral City, California.

The play is one of the few in Broadway history to have its entire cast nominated for a Tony Award.

== Song list ==
- "Dirty Blonde"
- "A Guy What Takes His Time"
- "Cuddle Up and Cling to Me"
- "I Found a New Way to Go to Town"
- "I'm No Angel"
- "I Love It"
- "I Want You, I Need You"
- "I Wonder Where My Easy Rider's Gone"
- "Oh My, How We Pose"
- "Perfect Love"

== Critical reception ==
Ben Brantley, in his review for The New York Times of the Off-Broadway production, called it "a beautifully written work... with a shiver-making pinnacle..."

The CurtainUp reviewer of the Off-Broadway production wrote: " 'Dirty Blonde' ...is very much a play; in fact, it has enough music, including Bob Stillman's eponymous original song, to be classified as a play with music The monologist has become a mature playwright. The stand-up comic has developed enough depth to render two engaging character portraits. Her Mae may not be true blue West but she's caught the essence of 'the movie equivalent of Venice.'"

== Awards and honors ==
Source: PlaybillVault

=== Original Broadway production ===
Year	Award ceremony	Category	Nominee	Result
2000	Tony Award	Best Play		Nominated
2000	Tony Award	Best Actress in a Play	Claudia Shear	Nominated
2000	Tony Award	Best Performance by a Featured Actor in a Play	Bob Stillman	Nominated
2000	Tony Award	Best Performance by a Featured Actor in a Play	Kevin Chamberlin	Nominated
2000	Tony Award	Best Direction of a Play	James Lapine	Nominated
2000	Drama Desk Award	Outstanding Play	Claudia Shear	Nominated
2000	Drama Desk Award	Outstanding Actress in a Play	Claudia Shear	Nominated
2000	Drama Desk Award	Outstanding Actor in a Play	Kevin Chamberlin	Nominated
2000	Drama Desk Award	Outstanding Lighting Design	David Lander	Nominated
2000	Theatre World Award		Claudia Shear	Won
