= Five, Six, Seven, Nate! =

2014 novel by Tim Federle

- Author: Tim Federle
- Language: English
- Genre: Young adult novel
- Publisher: Simon and Schuster
- Publication date: January 21, 2014
- Publication place: United States
- Pages: 293
- Awards: Lambda Literary Award
- ISBN: 9-781-4424-4693-9
- Preceded by: Better Nate Than Ever
- Followed by: Nate Expectations

Five, Six, Seven, Nate! is a young adult novel by Tim Federle. This is the second book in the Nate series of books, which follows a teenage boy as he attempts to follow his dream of starring in a Broadway show. In Five, Six, Seven, Nate!, Nate Foster is called as an understudy and finds a chance to shine when the main actor has to be replaced.

The book was published in 2014 by Simon and Schuster and received a Lambda Literary Award in 2015.

== Reception ==
The Bulletin of the Center for Children's Books commented on the lack of depth of Nate's relationships when compared to Better Nate Than Ever, but that's compensated by the "exaggerated exposé behind the scenes of a Broadway show that's sure to entertain". The reviewer also mentions how the "zany characters" help make this a book with light humor.

In his review for The Booklist, Andrew Medlar says "[r]eaders will cheer Nate along while also relating to him". Kirkus Reviews praised the Federle's humor, calling it one of his greatest strengths, but said that what makes this a special novel is "how beautifully he explores Nate's vulnerabilities, particularly with regard to his sexuality, his family and his own self-esteem."

The book was awarded the Lambda Literary Award for Children's and Young Adult Literature in its 27th edition. It was also an Odyssey Award Honor in 2014.
