= Claudia Shear =

American actress and playwright

- Occupations: Actor; author; playwright
- Years active: 1993–present

Claudia Shear is an American actress and playwright. She was nominated for the Tony Award, Best Play and Best Actress for her play Dirty Blonde.

== Early life ==
Shear was born to Julian "Bud" Shear, who left her mother and her older sister Diane, soon after she was born. She attended the City College of New York.

== Career ==
Shear came to prominence with her self-penned solo performance piece Blown Sideways Through Life (described by Frank Rich as an "autobiographical monologue"). The show premiered at the New York Theatre Workshop in September 1993. The show then opened at the Off-Broadway Cherry Lane Theatre on January 7, 1994, closing on July 17, 1994, after 221 performances. Shear won an Obie Award, Special Citation and a 1994 Drama Desk Award nomination for Outstanding Solo Performance. Shear's employment experiences as a member of the American work force - sixty-four jobs in all, including pastry chef, nude model, waitress, whorehouse receptionist, proofreader, and Italian translator - provided her a wealth of material for her piece. She adapted it for a 1995 presentation on the PBS series American Playhouse.

Shear wrote the play Dirty Blonde, her exploration of the life and career of Mae West. The play premiered Off-Broadway at the New York Theatre Workshop, running from January 10, 2000, to February 13, 2000 and then opened on Broadway at the Helen Hayes Theatre on April 14, 2000 (previews); both productions were directed by James Lapine. She earned Tony and Drama Desk Award nominations for both Best Play and Best Actress and won the Theatre World Award.

Shear's acting credits include the films It Could Happen to You (1994) and Living Out Loud (1998) and a guest appearance as "fake Monica" on the NBC sitcom Friends in 1995. She has also written for such publications as The New York Times, Vogue, and Travel & Leisure, among others.

Restoration, a new play written by her, premiered in June 2009 at La Jolla Playhouse in La Jolla, California, commissioned by La Jolla Playhouse Artistic Director Christopher Ashley after an idea by Shear. In Restoration, Shear plays "Giulia, a down-on-her-luck art restorer from Brooklyn who receives what could possibly be a career-reviving job of 'refreshing' Michelangelo’s David in time for its quincentennial celebration in Florence." Christopher Ashley, who staged the world premiere of Restoration at La Jolla Playhouse, directed the work for its New York debut. The play premiered Off-Broadway at the New York Theatre Workshop on April 30, 2010 (previews) and officially on May 19, 2010, through June 13, 2010.

Shear appeared in the Broadway play by Michele Lowe, The Smell of the Kill, which had a brief run of 40 performances in 2002.

Shear co-wrote the book for the new musical based on the book Tuck Everlasting, also titled Tuck Everlasting. The music and lyrics are written by Chris Miller and Nathan Tysen with direction by Casey Nicholaw. The musical premiered at the Alliance Theatre, Atlanta, from January 21, 2015, to February 22, 2015. The musical opened on Broadway in previews on March 31, 2016, and officially in April 2016.

In 2017 she starred in EVENING AT THE TALKHOUSE, written by Wallace Shawn, with Matthew Broderick at The New Group at the Signature Theatre in New York City.

== Stage ==
Year	Title	Role	Venue	Ref.
1993	Blown Sideways Through Life	Performer, Playwright	Off-Broadway, New York Theatre Workshop	
1994	Blown Sideways Through Life	Performer, Playwright	Off-Broadway, Cherry Lane Theatre	
2000	Dirty Blonde	Jo/Mae, Playwright	Off-Broadway, New York Theatre Workshop	
2000	Dirty Blonde	Jo/Mae, Playwright	Broadway, Hayes Theatre	
2001	The Women	Performer	Broadway, American Airlines Theatre	
2002	The Smell of the Kill	Debra	Broadway, Hayes Theatre	
2004	Dirty Blonde	Jo/Mae, Playwright	London, Duke of York's Theatre	
2010	Restoration	Playwright	Regional, New York Theatre Workshop	
2015	Tuck Everlasting	Bookwriter	Regional, Alliance Theatre	
2016	Tuck Everlasting	Bookwriter	Broadway, Broadhurst Theatre	
2017	Evening at the Talk House	Performer	Off-Broadway, The New Group	
2026	The Recipe	Playwright	San Diego, La Jolla Playhouse	

== Awards and nominations ==
Year	Award	Category	Work	Result
1994	Drama Desk Award	Outstanding Solo Performance	Blown Sideways Through Life	Nominated
1994	Obie Award	Special Citation	Blown Sideways Through Life	Honored
2000	Tony Award	Best Actress in a Play	Dirty Blonde	Nominated
2000	Tony Award	Best Play	Dirty Blonde	Nominated
2000	Drama Desk Award	Outstanding Play	Dirty Blonde	Nominated
2000	Drama Desk Award	Outstanding Actress in a Play	Dirty Blonde	Nominated
2000	Theatre World Award	Theatre World Award	Dirty Blonde	Won
2002	Helen Hayes Award	Outstanding Lead Actress, Non-Resident Production	Dirty Blonde	Nominated
