= Tuck Everlasting (1981 film) =

1981 film by Frederick King Keller

- Directed by: Frederick King Keller
- Written by: Natalie Babbitt (novel); Fred A. Keller; Frederick King Keller
- Produced by: Howard Kling; Frederick King Keller
- Starring: Margaret Chamberlain; Paul Fleesa; Fred A. Keller; James McGuire; Sonia Raimi
- Cinematography: Michael Mathews
- Edited by: Howard Kling; Michael Mathews
- Music by: Malcolm Dalglish; Grey Larsen
- Distributed by: One Pass Media
- Release date: June 5, 1981
- Running time: 90 minutes
- Country: United States
- Language: English
- Budget: $150,000

Tuck Everlasting is an American television film based on Natalie Babbitt's 1975 book of the same title. The film premiered in 1980 on Channel 4 in New York.

== Background ==
After Frederick King Keller made the TV movie Skeleton Key, he met Natalie Babbitt at Smith College in Northampton, Massachusetts. He liked her novel Tuck Everlasting and decided to produce and direct a film based on it.

The film was produced with a budget of $150,000 in Buffalo, New York, in association with the Roman Catholic Diocese of Buffalo. Production ran from 1977 to 1980 and was stalled three times due to budget issues.

== Plot ==
The story involves the Tucks, a family who drank from a magic spring from the Fosters' little forest and became immortal (hence the name "Tuck Everlasting").

== Cast ==
- Margaret Chamberlain – Winnie Foster
- Paul Flessa – Jesse Tuck
- Fred A. Keller – Angus Tuck
- James McGuire – Man in the Yellow Suit
- Sonia Raimi – Mae Tuck
- Marvin Macnow – Mr. Foster
- Bruce D'Auria – Miles Tuck
- Patricia Roth – Script Supervior
- Joel Chaney - Boy #2

== Filming ==
Much of the film was shot in Western New York, including the opening scene which was shot at the Grape Festival in Silver Creek. Filming also took place in Adirondack for one year. Filming was completed at the start of 1980.

== Reception ==
The film received generally positive reviews from St. Petersburg Times' Robert Alan Ross and Tampa Times' Steve Otto; the latter called the film "a finely crafted, intelligent and completely enjoyable picture." Buffalo Evening News' Mary Ann Lauricella thought the cinematography was "a treat for the eye" that made up for the film's occasional slow pacing.

== Other adaptations ==
- Tuck Everlasting (2002 film)
