= Maggie Keenan-Bolger =

American dramatist

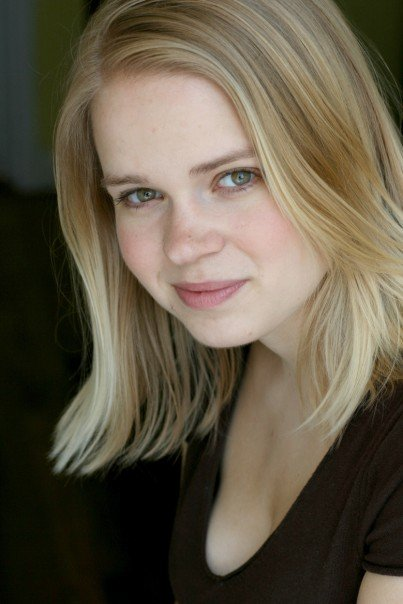
- Born: Margaret Keenan-Bolger; Detroit, Michigan, U.S.
- Education: Oberlin College (BA); City University of New York (MA); Goddard College (MFA)
- Occupations: Actress, playwright, sex educator

Margaret Keenan-Bolger is an American actress, playwright, self-described sex educator and founder of Honest Accomplice Theatre. She is the sister of Celia Keenan-Bolger and Andrew Keenan-Bolger.

== Life and career ==
Keenan-Bolger was born in Detroit, Michigan. She appeared as a munchkin in the Madison Square Garden production of the Wizard of Oz at 13 years old. She has credits in the national tours of The Will Rogers Follies and The Music Man as well as college productions at Oberlin College where she graduated from in 2006 with a BA in Theatre and Gender & Woman's Studies with a minor in Comparative American Studies.

She created and wrote the play From the Inside, Out about her own experiences as a self injurer and other stories about cutting. Produced by 4th Meal Productions, it was originally performed at Oberlin College and also played at the New York International Fringe Festival in August 2008.

In 2010 she graduated with a Master of Arts in Applied Theatre from CUNY School of Professional Studies. While there, she produced, directed and performed in Her Train Of Thought.

She is the artistic director of Honest Accomplice Theatre.

A two-time Point Foundation scholar, Keenan-Bolger earned her MFA in Interdisciplinary Arts from Goddard College in 2014, where her focus was on Political Theatre, LGBTQIA and Feminist Studies. She was invited to the White House by Vice-President Joe Biden as an LGBT Leader of the Next Generation and was profiled in The Advocate's "People to Watch in 2015". She has worked for Bridging the Gap, and I Love Female Orgasm Program. Keenan-Bolger is openly queer and out about being a person with a disability.
