= Theatre World =

Americam theatre publication (est. 1945)

- Discipline: Theatre
- Language: English

Publication details
- History: 1944-2013
- Frequency: Annual
- ISO 4: Find out here

Indexing
- ISSN: 0082-3856

Theatre World was an annual American theatre pictorial and statistical print publication. It includes Broadway, Off-Broadway, Off-Off-Broadway, and regional theatre, national theatrical awards, and obituaries.

== Theatre World ==
In 1944, three young men who loved theater, Daniel Blum, Norman McDonald, and John Willis, created Theatre World, a magazine about the theater.

Theatre World was first published in 1945. George Jean Nathan's annual Theatre Book Of The Year (Alfred A. Knopf) preceded and competed.

Theatre World is an annual pictorial and statistical record of American theatre, in print. It includes Broadway, Off-Broadway, Off-Off-Broadway, and regional theatre, as well as a complete national theatrical awards section and obituaries. It is a pictorial and statistical reference to each American theatrical season, and is used by industry professionals, students, historians, and fans.

Theatre World is the recipient of a 2001 Tony Honor for Excellence in Theatre, presented by the American Theatre Wing. On behalf of the publication, longtime editor-in-chief, John Willis (1916-2010), accepted honors including the first Special Lucille Lortel Award, a Special Drama Desk Award, and the Broadway Theatre Institute (now The Theatre Museum) Lifetime Achievement Award.

Theatre World was published annually by Theatre World Media.

== Theatre World Awards ==
The Theatre World Awards were created in 1944 by Daniel Blum, Norman McDonald, and John Willis, the Theatre World founders to coincide with the first publication of Theatre World.

Until 1998, the Theatre World editorial staff administered the Theatre World Awards for Outstanding Broadway and off-Broadway debuts. First under the supervision of Theatre World founder Daniel Blum and then under John Willis, who took over the production of the Awards following Blum's death in 1964, the Theatre World Awards were first given to those recipients considered "Promising Personalities." In 1998, the Theatre World Awards were incorporated as a 501 (c) 3 nonprofit organization and are currently overseen by a board of directors independent of "Theatre World."

== Daniel Blum ==
Daniel Blum (1900–1965) was born in Chicago, Illinois. His father was president of Federated Metals. He attended Shakespeare Grammar School in Chicago, Howe Prep School in Howe, Indiana, and the Wharton School of Business, then went to work for Federated in Chicago.

From 1929 to 1940, he was a producer and columnist, while amassing a theatrical collection. By 1940, his private collection had required a full-time staff to maintain it. By 1951, his staff could no longer both help him compile his books on the theater and maintain his collection.

In 1929, he co-produced Bambina's road production, it lost 50,000 dollars. He was drama critic for the Chicago Journal of Commerce, 1934 to 1937. He was drama editor for the Manhattan Magazine in 1939. He directed summer stock in Abingdon, Virginia (1940) at the Barter Theatre. He was assistant stage manager for Sons and Soldiers (1943), New York City. He co-produced, with Malcolm Wells, The Country Wife (1957), Playwrights Company (1957), and Between Seasons (1961).

The success of Theatre World prompted Screen World (1950-1965), Opera World (1952-1954) and John Willis' Dance World.

== Works, by founder, Daniel Blum ==
Blum also compiled and published seven non-annual books: A Pictorial History of the Silent Screen (1953), A Pictorial History of the Opera in America (1954), A Pictorial History of the Talkies (1958), and A Pictorial History of Television (1959). A Pictorial History of the American Theatre, 100 Years: 1860-1960 (1960). Only Great Stars of the American Stage (1952) did not feature a photograph-filled, large-sized volume, with minimal text.
