= Celia Keenan-Bolger =

American actress and singer (born 1978)

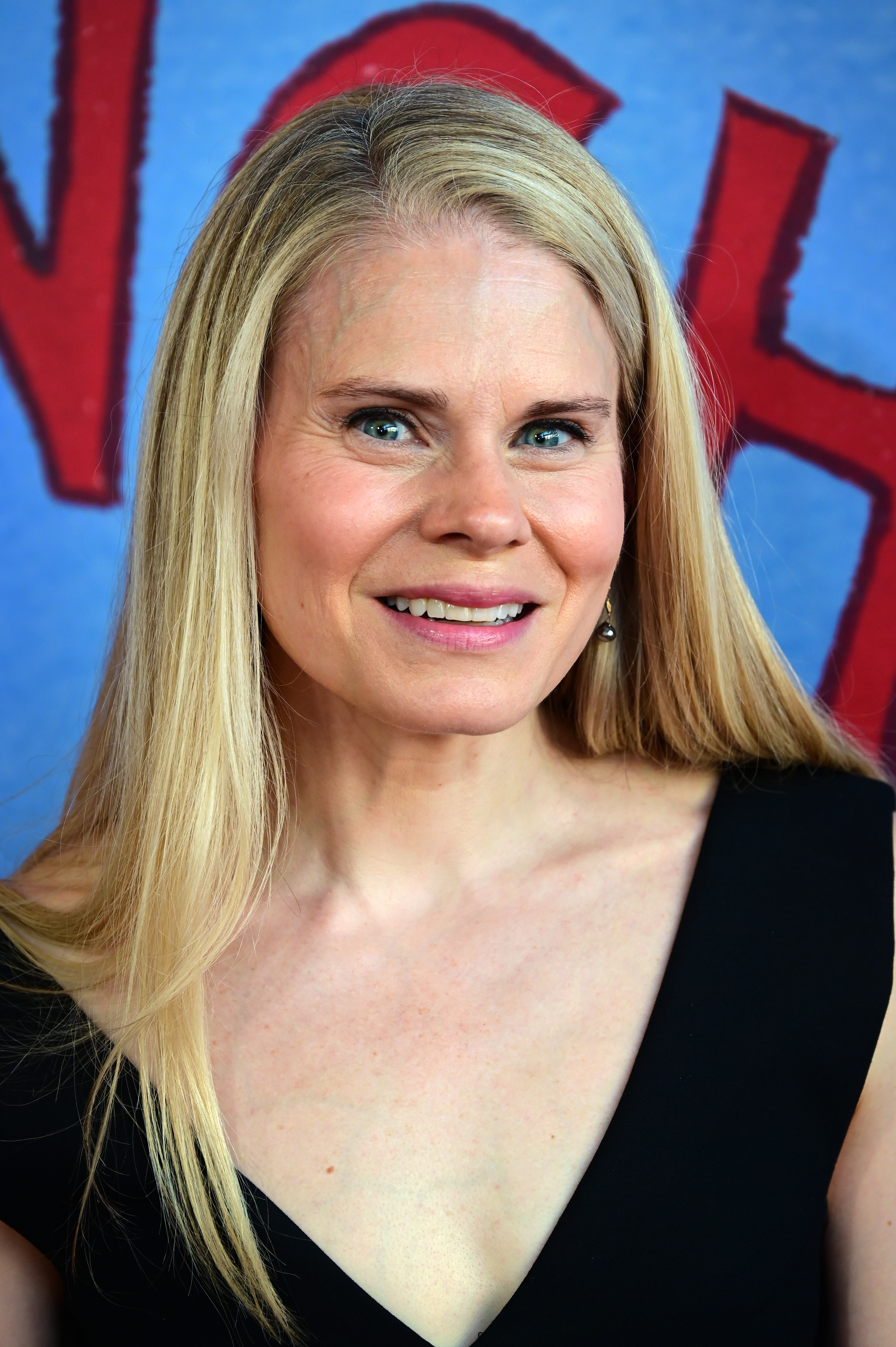
- Keenan-Bolger in 2026
- Born: January 26, 1978 (age 48); Detroit, Michigan, U.S.
- Education: University of Michigan (BFA)
- Occupations: Actress, singer
- Years active: 2001–present
- Spouse: John Ellison Conlee (m. 2010)
- Children: 1
- Relatives: Maggie Keenan-Bolger (sister); Andrew Keenan-Bolger (brother)

Celia Keenan-Bolger (born January 26, 1978) is an American actress and singer. She won the Tony Award for Best Featured Actress in a Play for portraying Scout Finch in the play To Kill a Mockingbird (2018). She has also been Tony-nominated for her roles in The 25th Annual Putnam County Spelling Bee (2005), Peter and the Starcatcher (2012), The Glass Menagerie (2014), and Mother Play (2024).

== Early life and education ==
Keenan-Bolger was born in Detroit, Michigan, the eldest of three children. She has a sister, Maggie, and a brother, Andrew.

She trained as a youth at the Mosaic Youth Theatre of Detroit and the Detroit School of Arts High School. She also attended Interlochen Center for the Arts. She is a graduate of the University of Michigan's musical theatre performance program.

== Career ==
Keenan-Bolger's regional credits include Johanna in Sweeney Todd: The Demon Barber of Fleet Street at the Kennedy Center Sondheim Celebration in 2002, along with productions at the Goodman Theatre, TheatreWorks and Sundance Theatre Program. In 2003, she originated the role of Clara Johnson in the pre-Broadway world premiere of the Craig Lucas/Adam Guettel musical The Light in the Piazza at Seattle's Intiman Theatre and Chicago's Goodman Theatre. Her Off-Broadway credits include Kindertransport, Little Fish and Summer of '42.

She appeared on the concept cast album of Bright Lights, Big City. She has sung in concert at the Lincoln Center American Songbook Series and at the Michigan Theatre with Audra McDonald. Keenan-Bolger performed as Martha in the 2005 The Secret Garden World AIDS Day benefit concert.

In 2005, Keenan-Bolger made her Broadway debut starring in William Finn's musical The 25th Annual Putnam County Spelling Bee, where she originated the role of Olive Ostrovsky. For this performance, she was nominated for a Tony Award for Best Featured Actress in a Musical. She had appeared in the musical from its beginning at the Barrington Stage Company (Pittsfield, Massachusetts) in July 2004, to the Off-Broadway production at the Second Stage Theatre in January through March 2005. With the original Broadway cast, she returned to The 25th Annual Putnam County Spelling Bee for a four-week limited engagement run at the Wadsworth Theatre in Los Angeles from May through June 2007.

She appeared on Broadway in the revival of Les Misérables as street waif Éponine from October 2006 to April 2007, for which she received a Drama Desk Award nomination. She also participated in a reading of Shrek The Musical as Princess Fiona in 2007.

Keenan-Bolger appeared in the Playwrights Horizons production of the new musical Saved with music and lyrics by Michael Friedman and a book by John Dempsey and Rinne Groff in 2008. She appeared in Bachelorette at the Second Stage Theatre and in Adam Bock's A Small Fire, opposite Michele Pawk and Reed Birney.

Keenan-Bolger starred as Mary Flynn in the Encores! production of Merrily We Roll Along, which played at the New York City Center from February 8 through 19, 2012.

In 2011, she starred in the New York Theatre Workshop production of Peter and the Starcatcher, a stage adaptation of the 2004 best-selling children's novel of a similar name. She reprised the role of Molly in the Broadway transfer production of Peter and the Starcatcher, which played at the Brooks Atkinson Theatre from March 28, 2012, through January 20, 2013. Keenan-Bolger received Drama Desk Award and Tony Award nominations for her performance.

Keenan-Bolger played Laura Wingfield in the American Repertory Theater production of The Glass Menagerie alongside Cherry Jones, Zachary Quinto and Brian J. Smith, from February 2, 2013, through March 17, 2013. Keenan-Bolger reprised her role in the production's Broadway transfer, which ran from September 5, 2013, through February 23, 2014, at the Booth Theatre. She received a third Tony Award nomination for her performance.

Keenan-Bolger starred in the Lincoln Center production of Sarah Ruhl's The Oldest Boy, which began performances at the Mitzi E. Newhouse Theater on October 9, 2014.

She participated in a reading of The Brave Little Toaster: The Musical as the titular character. Others involved included Carol Channing, reprising her role as the Ceiling Fan. In early 2015, she appeared in a live reading of Eric Carle's Animals, Animals for the Autistic Children's Trust in Bangor, Maine.

In 2016, Keenan-Bolger played Varya in the Roundabout Theatre Company production of The Cherry Orchard.

She starred on Broadway in To Kill a Mockingbird as Scout, which opened in December 2018 and closed in March 2020 due to the COVID-19 pandemic. She received a Tony Award for Featured Actress in a Play, a Drama Desk Award, an Outer Critics Circle Award, and a Drama League Award nomination for her performance. Keenan-Bolger reprised her role when the Broadway production reopened in October 2021 and played her final performance on January 2, 2022.

In November 2020, Keenan-Bolger was announced as part of the cast of HBO's new series The Gilded Age. She played Mrs. Bruce in the first season of the show, and it was announced that she would return as a series regular for season 2, which was filmed in 2022.

In 2024, Keenan-Bolger starred on Broadway in Paula Vogel's Mother Play, opposite Jessica Lange and Jim Parsons. The production, a part of Second Stage Theatre's 2023–2024 season, ran at the Hayes Theatre, with previews beginning April 3, before opening on April 25th, 2024. She received a nomination for the Tony Award for Best Featured Actress in a Play and won the Drama Desk Award for Outstanding Featured Performance in a Play. The production closed on June 16, 2024, after its limited run.

On April 29, 2025, it was announced that Keenan-Bolger would be awarded the 2025 Isabelle Stevenson Award, a non-competitive Tony Award, in recognition for her long history of advocacy work through the arts.

== Personal life ==
Keenan-Bolger has been married to actor John Ellison Conlee since 2010. They have a son, born in 2015.

She became an end-of-life doula in 2022 and was the end-of-life doula for Gavin Creel, a close friend of hers.

== Acting credits ==
=== Film ===
Year	Title	Role	Notes
2012	Mariachi Gringo	Tammy	
2015	The Visit	Stacey	
2017	Breakable You	Jenny	
2018	Diane	Tally	

=== Television ===
Year	Title	Role	Notes
2002	The Education of Max Bickford	—N/a	Episode: "Murder of the First"
2007	Law & Order	Elaine Fowler	Episode: "Murder Book"
2007	Heartland	Alice	Episode: "Smile"
2008	The Battery's Down	Voter Registration Girl	Episode: "The Bronx is Up"
2012	Submissions Only	Michelle Loudon	Episode: "Another Interruption"
2014	Law & Order: Special Victims Unit	Mavis Summers	Episode: "Reasonable Doubt"
2014	Nurse Jackie	Goth Patient	Episode: "The Lady with the Lamp"
2015	Louie	Julianne	Episode: "Pot Luck"
2015	The Good Wife	Wendy Searle	Episode: "Driven"
2015	Elementary	Amber Bova	Episode: "The Cost of Doing Business"
2016	Good Behavior	Daphne Rochefort	Episode: "So You're Not an English Teacher"
2017	Blue Bloods	Ellen Turner	Episode: "A Deep Blue Goodbye"
2017	NCIS: New Orleans	Jolene Sawyer	Episode: "Sins of the Father"
2018	Bull	Kristen Grayson	Episode: "A Redemption"
2022–present	The Gilded Age	Mrs. Bruce	Recurring role (season 1), series regular (season 2)
2026	The Terror: Devil in Silver	Sam	Recurring role (season 3: Devil in Silver)
2026	Line of Fire	Nicki	season 1 episode 2 "A Bigger Picture"

=== Theatre ===
Year	Title	Role	Venue	Ref.
2002	Sweeney Todd: The Demon Barber of Fleet Street	Johanna Barker	The Kennedy Center	
2003	Little Fish	Young Girl u/s Charlotte / Cinder	Second Stage Theatre	
2004	The Light in the Piazza	Clara Johnson	Goodman Theatre	
2005	The 25th Annual Putnam County Spelling Bee	Olive Ostrovsky	Second Stage Theatre	
2005	The Secret Garden	Martha	Manhattan Center Concert	
2005-2006	The 25th Annual Putnam County Spelling Bee	Olive Ostrovsky	Circle in the Square Theatre	
2006–2007	Les Misérables	Éponine	Broadhurst Theatre	
2007	The 25th Annual Putnam County Spelling Bee	Olive Ostrovsky	Wadsworth Theatre	
2008	Saved	Mary	Playwrights Horizons	
2010	Bachelorette	Katie	McGinn-Cazale Theatre	
2010–2011	A Small Fire	Jenny Bridges	Playwrights Horizons	
2011	Peter and the Starcatcher	Molly Aster	New York Theatre Workshop	
2012	Merrily We Roll Along	Mary Flynn	New York City Center Concert	
2012	Peter and the Starcatcher	Molly Aster	Brooks Atkinson Theatre	
2013–2014	The Glass Menagerie	Laura Wingfield	American Repertory Theater	
2013–2014	The Glass Menagerie	Laura Wingfield	Booth Theatre	
2014	The Oldest Boy	Mother	Mitzi E. Newhouse Theater	
2016	The Cherry Orchard	Varya	American Airlines Theatre	
2017	A Parallelogram	Bee	Second Stage Theatre	
2018–2022	To Kill a Mockingbird	Scout Finch	Shubert Theatre	
2024	Mother Play	Martha	Helen Hayes Theater	
2026	Antigone (This Play I Read in High School)	Chorus	Public Theater	

== Awards and nominations ==
Organizations	Year	Category	Work	Result	Ref.
Actor Awards	2023	Outstanding Ensemble in a Drama Series	The Gilded Age	Nominated	
Broadway.com Audience Choice Award	2012	Favorite Actress in a Play	Peter and the Starcatcher	Won	
Broadway.com Audience Choice Award	2014	Favorite Featured Actress in a Play	The Glass Menagerie	Won	
Broadway.com Audience Choice Award	2019	Favorite Featured Actress in a Play	To Kill a Mockingbird	Won	
Broadway.com Audience Choice Award	2024	Favorite Featured Actress in a Play	Mother Play	Nominated	
Drama Desk Award	2005	Outstanding Ensemble Performance	The 25th Annual Putnam County Spelling Bee	Won	
Drama Desk Award	2007	Outstanding Featured Actress in a Musical	Les Misérables	Nominated	
Drama Desk Award	2011	Outstanding Featured Actress in a Play	Peter and the Starcatcher	Nominated	
Drama Desk Award	2014	Outstanding Featured Actress in a Play	The Glass Menagerie	Won	
Drama Desk Award	2019	Outstanding Featured Actress in a Play	To Kill a Mockingbird	Won	
Drama Desk Award	2024	Outstanding Featured Performance in a Play	Mother Play	Won	
Drama League Award	2012	Distinguished Performance	Peter and the Starcatcher	Nominated	
Drama League Award	2019	Distinguished Performance	To Kill a Mockingbird	Nominated	
Outer Critics Circle Award	2019	Outstanding Featured Actress in a Play	To Kill a Mockingbird	Won	
Outer Critics Circle Award	2024	Outstanding Featured Performance in a Play	Mother Play	Nominated	
Theatre World Award	2005	Distinguished Performance	The 25th Annual Putnam County Spelling Bee	Won	
Theatre World Award	2014	Excellence in the Theatre	The Glass Menagerie	Won	
Tony Award	2005	Best Featured Actress in a Musical	The 25th Annual Putnam County Spelling Bee	Nominated	
Tony Award	2012	Best Featured Actress in a Play	Peter and the Starcatcher	Nominated	
Tony Award	2014	Best Featured Actress in a Play	The Glass Menagerie	Nominated	
Tony Award	2019	Best Featured Actress in a Play	To Kill a Mockingbird	Won	
Tony Award	2024	Best Featured Actress in a Play	Mother Play	Nominated	
Tony Award	2025	Isabelle Stevenson Award		Honored	
