= Andrew Keenan-Bolger =

American actor (born 1985)

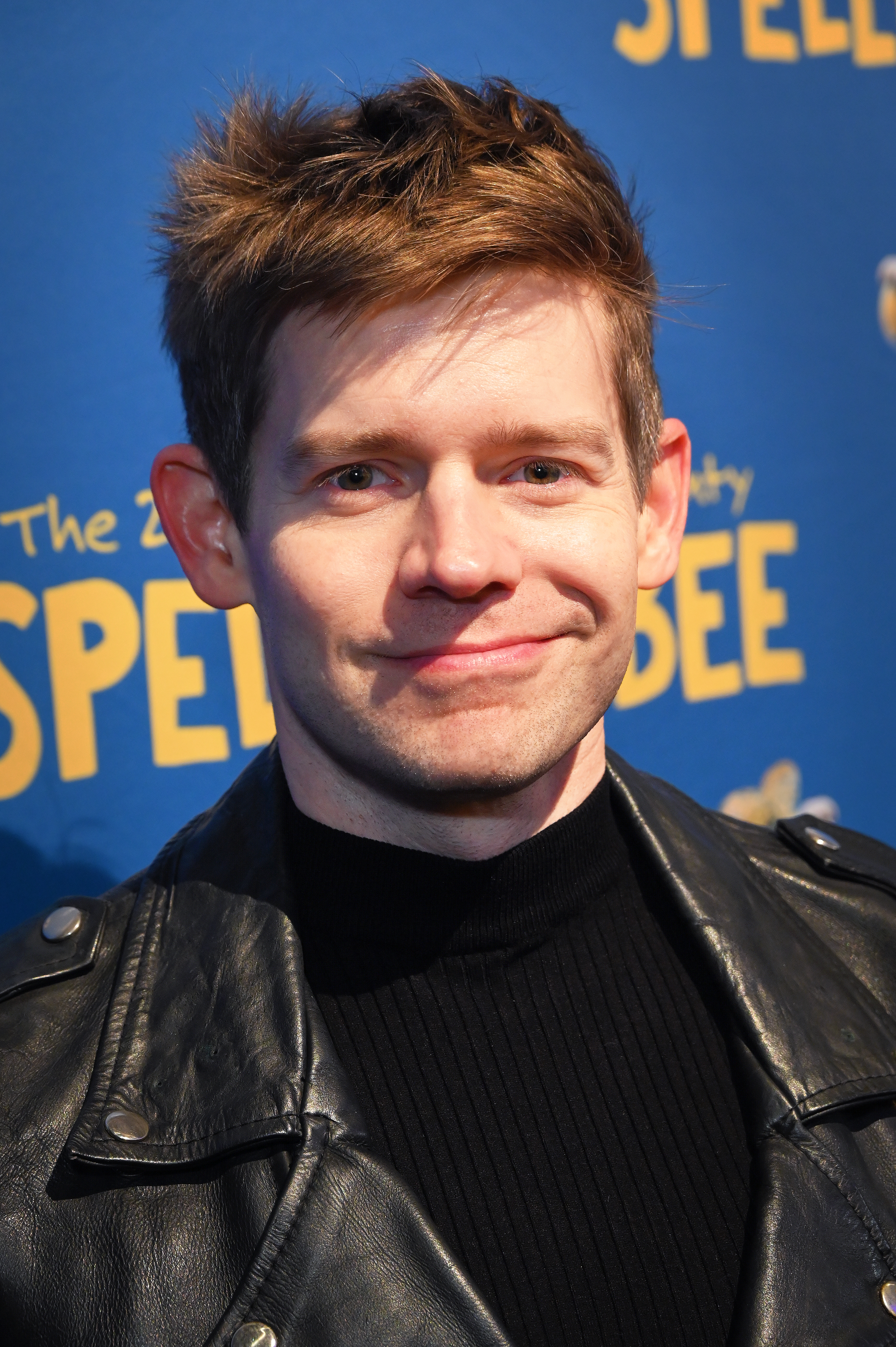
- Keenan-Bolger in 2025
- Born: May 16, 1985 (age 41); Detroit, Michigan, U.S.
- Education: University of Michigan (BFA)
- Occupation: Actor
- Years active: 1996–present
- Known for: Newsies; Tuck Everlasting; Submissions Only
- Spouse: Scott Bixby (m. 2018)
- Relatives: Maggie Keenan-Bolger (sister); Celia Keenan-Bolger (sister)

Andrew Keenan-Bolger (born May 16, 1985) is an American actor. He is best known for originating the roles of Crutchie in Newsies and Jesse Tuck in Tuck Everlasting on Broadway. His other Broadway credits include Robertson Ay in Mary Poppins, Jojo in Seussical, and Chip in Beauty and the Beast.

In 2010, Keenan-Bolger co-created the web series Submissions Only with Kate Wetherhead. He serves as the series' director and editor. He has also directed two short films, Sign and The Ceiling Fan.

== Early life and education ==
A Detroit native, Keenan-Bolger is the brother of Celia Keenan-Bolger and Maggie Keenan-Bolger. He graduated from Renaissance High School and the University of Michigan, where he received a Bachelor of Fine Arts, in musical theatre, in 2007.

== Career ==
As a teenager, Keenan-Bolger was in the original 2000 cast of Seussical on Broadway, as an alternate Jojo. He made his Broadway debut in the mid-1990s as Chip in Beauty and the Beast, and appeared Off-Broadway in the 1999 return engagement of A Christmas Carol at Madison Square Garden as Young Scrooge. The actor was featured in the first national tours of The 25th Annual Putnam County Spelling Bee as Leaf Coneybear, Ragtime as the Little Boy, and How the Grinch Stole Christmas as Young Max. Other theater credits include High School Musical on Stage! at North Shore Music Theatre and Perez Hilton Saves the Universe at the 2008 Fringe Festival.

He has also been seen on television as Christophe on the series The Naked Brothers Band and as a weekly commentator on FNMTV on MTV. His film credits include Beauty and the Beast: The Enchanted Christmas and Marci X.

Keenan-Bolger created a video blog to promote North Shore Music Theatre's production of High School Musical in which he starred. Keenan-Bolger was a regular on fellow web series The Battery's Down. He is noted for his performance of the song 'You're in Vegas' which is available for download on iTunes.

In 2010, Keenan-Bolger co-created the web series Submissions Only with fellow Broadway performer Kate Wetherhead. He serves as the series' director and editor.

On October 12, 2010, he took over the role of Robertson Ay in the Broadway production of Disney's Mary Poppins and later played the part on the National tour. He created the role of Omar in the 5th Avenue Theater production of Disney's Aladdin (July 2011) and played Crutchie in Disney's Newsies (March 2012), a role he originally created at the Paper Mill Playhouse (September 2011). His last performance date as Crutchie was on March 11, 2013, so he could begin rehearsal for his role in the musical adaptation of Tuck Everlasting. He was supposed to star as Jesse Tuck, with performances beginning on July 28, 2013, at Boston's Colonial Theatre, but the show was delayed due to the lack of availability of a suitable theatre for its subsequent transfer to New York. He next performed in A.R. Gurney's drama Family Furniture, which ran from November 12 to December 22, 2013, at The Flea Theater in the TriBeCa section of New York City. He played the part of Billy Frazier in the 2014 romantic comedy film The Rewrite, starring Hugh Grant and Marisa Tomei.

He revisited the role of Jesse Tuck in the Broadway production of Tuck Everlasting which opened on April 26, 2016, and ran until May 29, 2016.

On May 23, 2017, Bolger revisited his role of Crutchie in the live-on-stage Newsies musical film.

== Personal life ==
Keenan-Bolger married Scott Bixby, the former White House reporter for The Daily Beast, on October 13, 2018.

== Filmography ==
=== Film and television ===
Year	Title	Role	Notes
Unknown	One Life to Live	Leo	3 episodes
1997	Beauty and the Beast: The Enchanted Christmas	Chip (singing voice)	
2003	Marci X	Chip Spinkle	
2008	The Naked Brothers Band	Christophe	4 episodes
2008–2015	The Battery's Down	Andrew	13 episodes
2013	Shit I Love	Cinematographer	Short
2014	Looking	Alex	1 episode
2014	Are You Joking?	Corey	
2014	The Rewrite	Billy Frazier	
2014	It Could Be Worse	Twink Slave	1 episode
2015	Nurse Jackie	Angus	1 episode
2015	Broadway Draft 2015	Anchor	Short
2015	Serial: The TV Show	Self, filmed by, and director	Short
2015	Death and Cupcakes	Dale Blankenship	Short
2016	The Ceiling Fan	Director	Short
2016	If Love Were All	Director	Short
2016	Sign	Director	Short
2017	Newsies: The Broadway Musical	Crutchie	
2018	The Marvelous Mrs. Maisel	Perry	1 episode
2018	Three Rivers	Roy	TV movie
2020	The Undoing	Jason Reynolds	2 episodes
2021	The Other Two	Himself	1 episode
2021	The Blacklist	Andrew Freeson	1 episode
2023	Mikey's Army	Director, executive producer and editor	Short
2023	The Nana Project	Editor	
2025	On Swift Horses	Rosie	
2025	V13	Hanisch	
TBD	Flirting With Possibilities	Charlie	Short

=== Theatre ===
Year	Title	Role	Notes
1996	Beauty and the Beast	Chip	Broadway replacement
1998	Ragtime	Little Boy	National tour
1999	A Christmas Carol	Young Scrooge	Off-Broadway
2000–2001	Seussical the Musical	Jojo	Broadway alternate
2007	The 25th Annual Putnam County Spelling Bee	Leaf Coneybear	National tour
2007	High School Musical on Stage!	Ryan Evans	North Shore Music Theatre
2008	Perez Hilton Saves the Universe	Zac Efron/Tom Cruise/Sarah Jessica Parker, etc.	New York Fringe Festival
2008	How the Grinch Stole Christmas	Young Max	National tour
2009	Mary Poppins	Robertson Ay	National tour
2010–2012	Mary Poppins	Robertson Ay	Broadway replacement
2011	Newsies	Crutchie	Paper Mill Playhouse
2012–2013	Newsies	Crutchie	Broadway original cast
2013	Family Furniture	Nick	Off-off-Broadway
2014	Tuck Everlasting	Jesse Tuck	Alliance Theater
2015	Ever After	Gustave	Paper Mill Playhouse
2016	Newsies	Crutchie	Pantages Theatre
2016	Tuck Everlasting	Jesse Tuck	Broadway original cast
2017	Kris Kringle the Musical	Kris Kringle	Off-Broadway
2019	Little Shop of Horrors	Seymour	Cape Playhouse
2021	Seven Deadly Sins	Philippe	Off-Broadway
2023	Dracula: A Comedy of Terrors	Harker & Others	Off-Broadway
2024	Scarlett Dreams	Kevin	Off-Broadway
2025	Titanique	Victor Garber	Off-Broadway

=== Concerts ===
Year	Title	Songs
2014	Submissions Only at 54 Below	Sings: "More of You", "Uh-Oh", "I Got a Reading" and "Nobody Does Mean Like Me"; Introduces: "Chin in My Hands"

=== Web ===
Year	Title	Role	Notes
2010–2014	Submissions Only	Donny Rich	Also Producer, Writer, Director, Video Editor, and Cinematographer
2014	SHERLOCK - The Musical (Season 3)	Dr. John Watson	Produced, Written, and Directed by YouTube channel AVByte
2020	Stars in the House	Himself	3 episodes

=== Scripted podcasts ===
Year	Title	Role
2018	Wolverine: The Long Night	Deputy Bobby Reid

== Bibliography ==
- Jack and Louisa: Act 1 (w/ Kate Wetherhead), 2015
- Jack and Louisa: Act 2 (w/ Kate Wetherhead), 2016
- Jack and Louisa: Act 3 (w/ Kate Wetherhead), 2017
- Limelight, 2026

== Awards and nominations ==
Year	Award	Category	Title	Result
2012	Outer Critics Circle Award	Outstanding Featured Actor in a Musical	Newsies	Nominated
2016	Drama League Award	Distinguished Performance	Tuck Everlasting	Nominated
