= To Kill a Mockingbird (2018 play) =

Play by Aaron Sorkin

- Original Broadway Production Poster
- Written by: Aaron Sorkin
- Based on: To Kill a Mockingbird by Harper Lee
- Genre: Drama
- Setting: Maycomb, Alabama

Premiere
- Date: December 13, 2018
- Place: Shubert Theatre, New York City
- Directed by: Bartlett Sher

To Kill a Mockingbird is a 2018 play based on the 1960 novel of the same name by Harper Lee, adapted for the stage by Aaron Sorkin. It opened on Broadway at the Shubert Theatre on December 13, 2018. The play opened in London's West End at the Gielgud Theatre in March 2022. The show follows the story of Atticus Finch, a lawyer in 1930s Alabama, as he defends Tom Robinson, a black man falsely accused of rape. Varying from the book, the play has Atticus as the protagonist, not his daughter Scout, allowing his character to change throughout the show. During development the show was involved in two legal disputes, the first with the Lee estate over the faithfulness of the play to the original book, and the second was due to exclusivity to the rights with productions using an earlier script by Christopher Sergel. During opening week, the production garnered more than $1.5 million in box office sales and reviews by publications such as the New York Times, LA Times and AMNY were positive but not without criticism.

== Production history ==
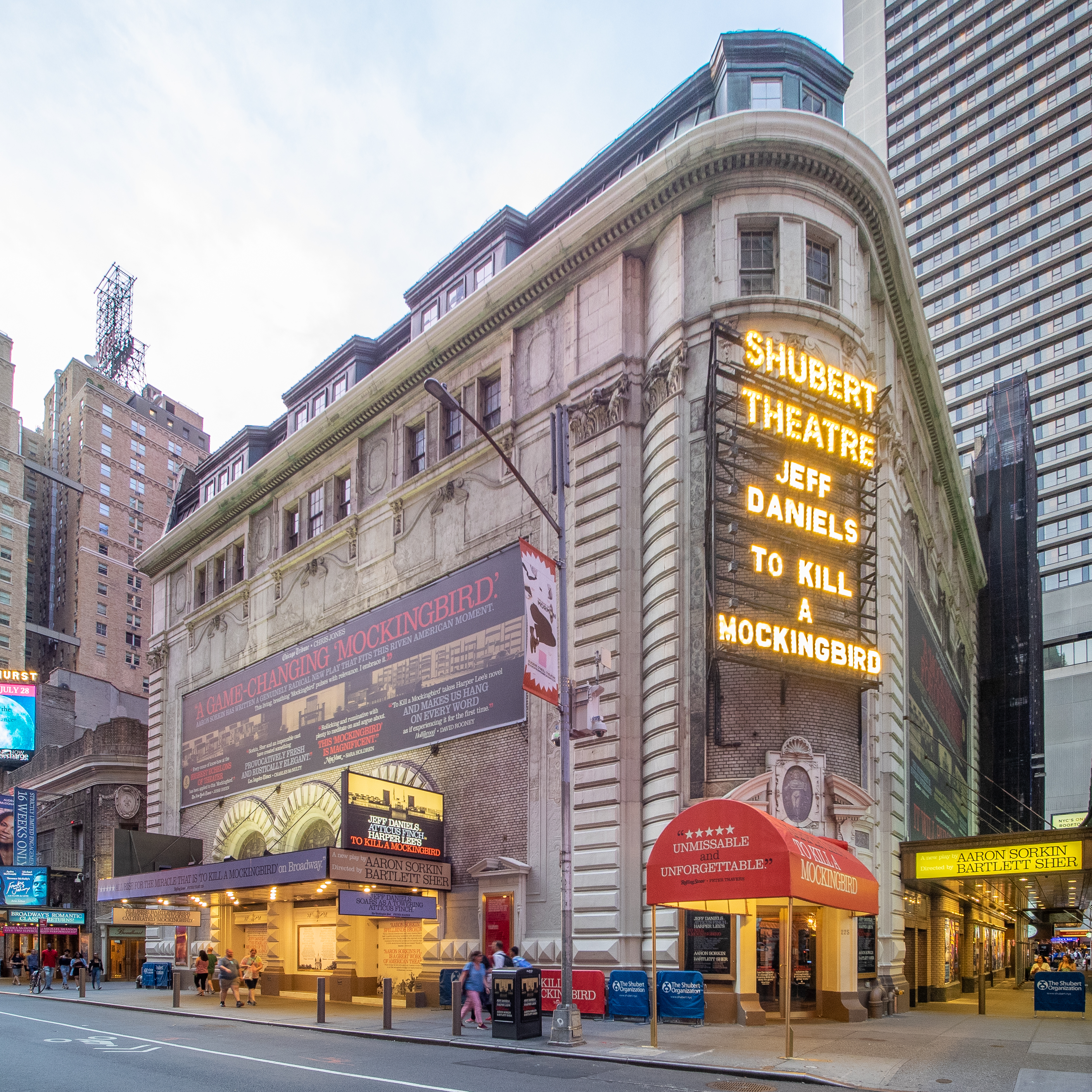
To Kill a Mockingbird at the Shubert Theatre in 2019

=== Broadway (2018–2022) ===
It was announced in February 2016 that Aaron Sorkin would bring the Pulitzer Prize-winning novel to Broadway, in a new production produced by Scott Rudin and directed by Bartlett Sher. The book had previously been adapted for the stage but Rudin specified that this production would be completely unrelated to the prior pieces. On February 15, 2018, it was announced that Jeff Daniels would star in the production as Atticus Finch. Celia Keenan-Bolger and Will Pullen were also announced to play Scout and Jem Finch, respectively. The production began previews at the Shubert Theatre on November 1, 2018, prior to an official opening on December 13, 2018.

During production the show was involved in two legal disputes, one with the Harper Lee estate, and the other against licensed productions of the Christopher Sergel adaptation.

On March 12, 2020, the play suspended production due to the COVID-19 pandemic. The play resumed performances on October 5, 2021 at the Shubert Theatre, with the original cast of Jeff Daniels and Celia Keenan-Bolger returning. A new executive producer, Orin Wolf, took over. On January 12, 2022, it was announced the show would play its final performance at the Shubert Theatre on January 16, and reopen at the Belasco Theatre on June 1. Greg Kinnear was set to resume as Atticus Finch when the production reopened. However, the production did not reopen and on July 29, 2022, it was reported the Broadway production would not reopen after producer Scott Rudin decided that he did not have confidence in the climate for plays the following winter.

=== West End (2022–2023) ===
In 2019 it was announced that the production would transfer to London's West End to the Gielgud Theatre opening in May 2020 with Rhys Ifans as Atticus Finch before being postponed due to the COVID-19 pandemic.

It eventually opened on 31 March 2022 with Rafe Spall replacing Ifans as Atticus Finch, and Gwyneth Keyworth as Scout.

Spall was replaced by Richard Coyle from August 2022 until November 2022, and then from December 2022 Matthew Modine took over as Atticus Finch until the end of the extended run on 20 May 2023, with Anna Munden replacing Keyworth as Scout.

=== West End revival (2026) ===
In February 2026, it was announced that, following a tour around the UK, the show would return to the West End for a limited season at Wyndham's Theatre, from 25 June 2026 to 12 September 2026, with Richard Coyle reprising his role as Atticus Finch.

== Cast ==
| Character | Broadway | West End | US National Tour | UK Tour |
| Character | 2018 | 2022 | | 2025 |
|---|---|---|---|---|
| Atticus Finch | Jeff Daniels | Rafe Spall | Richard Thomas | Richard Coyle |
| Scout Finch | Celia Keenan-Bolger | Gwyneth Keyworth | Melanie Moore | Anna Munden |
| Jem Finch | Will Pullen | Harry Redding | Justin Mark | Gabriel Scott |
| Dill Harris | Gideon Glick | David Moorst | Steven Lee Johnson | Dylan Mayln |
| Bob Ewell | Fred Weller | Patrick O'Kane | Joey Collins | Oscar Pearce |
| Tom Robinson | Gbenga Akinnagbe | Jude Owusu | Yaegel T. Welch | Aaron Shosanya |
| Horace Gilmer | Stark Sands | David Sturzaker | Luke Smith | Richard Dempsey |
| Judge John Taylor | Dakin Matthews | Jim Norton | Richard Poe | Stephen Boxer |
| Mayella Ewell | Erin Wilhelmi | Poppy Lee Friar | Arianna Gayle Stucki | Evie Hargreaves |
| Link Deas | Neal Huff | Lloyd Hutchinson | Anthony Natale | Simon Hepworth |
| Boo Radley | Danny Wolohan | Harry Attwell | Travis Johns | Harry Attwell |
| Calpurnia | LaTanya Richardson | Pamela Nomvete | Jacqueline Williams | Andrea Davy |

=== Notable replacements ===
Broadway (2018–2022)

- Atticus Finch – Ed Harris, Greg Kinnear
- Jem Finch – Nick Robinson, Hunter Parrish
- Dill Harris – Taylor Trensch, Noah Robbins
- Bob Ewell – Neal Huff
- Tom Robinson – Kyle Scatliffe
- Horace Gilmer – Manoel Felciano
- Judge John Taylor – Gordon Clapp
- Mayella Ewell – Eliza Scanlen
- Link Deas – Russell Harvard, William Youmans
- Boo Radley – Russell Harvard
- Calpurnia – LisaGay Hamilton

West End (2022–2023)

- Atticus Finch – Richard Coyle, Matthew Modine
- Bob Ewell – Jason Hughes
- Judge John Taylor – Niall Buggy
- Calpurnia – Cecilia Noble

== Legal disputes during production ==
=== Sorkin and the Harper Lee estate ===
During development of the play, the Lee estate believed that the proposed script varied too much from the book, and a complaint was filed in an Alabama federal court in March 2018. In discussion with Sorkin about the terms of use for the rights to produce a play, it was specified by the estate that the character of Atticus should not deviate from the original character created by Harper Lee. The Lee estate alleged that Sorkin had made too many changes to the original story by framing Atticus as the main character instead of Scout. Sorkin describes how the evolution of Atticus was viewed by the Lee estate as being "far less dignified" than the original character but the show's lawyers disputed this point stating his character "does not derogate or depart from the spirit of the novel." Because the Lee estate lawsuit was jeopardizing the release of the show, a countersuit of $10 million was filed by Sorkin's lawyers in April 2018. In May 2018, the premiere of the show was confirmed after an agreement was reached between the two parties, and both lawsuits were settled.

=== Rudin against licensed productions ===
Before Sorkin adapted To Kill a Mockingbird for the theatre, a different adaptation of the novel by playwright Christopher Sergel had been available for license for over 50 years. Claiming worldwide exclusivity for the professional stage rights to any adaptation of Lee's novel, lawyers acting for the company Scott Rudin formed to produce Sorkin's adaptation, Atticus LLC (ALLC), moved to shut down productions of the Sergel adaption staged within 25 miles of any city that ALLC determined to be a major metropolitan center that might eventually host a production of Sorkin's adaptation, even if that company had already paid the rights holders. Dozens of community and non-profit theaters across the US cancelled productions of Sergel's adaptation, as well as a professional tour planned in the UK. After a public outcry, Scott Rudin offered to "ameliorate the hurt caused" by making Sorkin's adaptation available to regional producers. In 2022, Harper Lee's estate was ordered by an arbitor to pay $2.5 million to Dramatic Publishing in damages and fees.

== Reception ==
=== Critical reception ===
While some critics criticized the liberties taken by Sorkin, the Los Angeles Times theater critic Charles McNulty wrote that Sorkin's adaptation "moves as confidently as it speaks even if it doesn't completely add up dramatically." McNulty disputes those who take issue with the changes Sorkin made to the story by stating that Sorkin "created something impeccably fresh." Jesse Green, a theater critic from the New York Times articulated that Sorkin's choice to start with the trial and provide backstory through scenes going back in time was "very effective" for telling the story on stage. Matt Windman argues that "some of Sorkin's choices are questionable" and that the set design was "too distracting to be effective." Windman also articulates that the show "proves to be an engrossing, provocative, and uniformly well-acted adaptation."

=== Box office ===
The show opened on December 13, 2018. During the week ending on December 23, the production grossed over $1.5 million, breaking the record for box office grosses for a non-musical play in a theater owned by The Shubert Organization. Prior to opening, $22 million were made in advance ticket sales at the box office.

== Awards and nominations ==
=== Broadway production ===
| Year | Award | Category | Nominee | Result |
|---|---|---|---|---|
| 2019 | Tony Awards | Best Actor in a Play | Jeff Daniels | Nominated |
| 2019 | Tony Awards | Best Featured Actor in a Play | Gideon Glick | Nominated |
| 2019 | Tony Awards | Best Featured Actress in a Play | Celia Keenan-Bolger | Won |
| 2019 | Tony Awards | Best Original Score | Adam Guettel | Nominated |
| 2019 | Tony Awards | Best Direction of a Play | Bartlett Sher | Nominated |
| 2019 | Tony Awards | Best Scenic Design of a Play | Miriam Buether | Nominated |
| 2019 | Tony Awards | Best Costume Design of a Play | Ann Roth | Nominated |
| 2019 | Tony Awards | Best Lighting Design of a Play | Jennifer Tipton | Nominated |
| 2019 | Tony Awards | Best Sound Design of a Play | Scott Lehrer | Nominated |
| 2019 | Drama Desk Award | Outstanding Featured Actress in a Play | Celia Keenan-Bolger | Won |
| 2019 | Drama League Awards | Outstanding Production of a Broadway or Off-Broadway Play | | Nominated |
| 2019 | Drama League Awards | Distinguished Performance Award | Jeff Daniels | Nominated |
| 2019 | Drama League Awards | Distinguished Performance Award | Celia Keenan-Bolger | Nominated |
| 2019 | Outer Critics Circle Awards | Outstanding New Broadway Play | | Nominated |
| 2019 | Outer Critics Circle Awards | Outstanding Featured Actress in a Play | Celia Keenan-Bolger | Won |
| 2019 | Outer Critics Circle Awards | Outstanding Director of a Play | Bartlett Sher | Nominated |

=== West End production ===
| Year | Award | Category | Nominee | Result |
|---|---|---|---|---|
| 2023 | Laurence Olivier Awards | Best Play | | Nominated |
| 2023 | Laurence Olivier Awards | Best Actor | Rafe Spall | Nominated |
| 2023 | Laurence Olivier Awards | Best Actor in a Supporting Role | David Moorst | Nominated |
| 2023 | Laurence Olivier Awards | Best Director | Bartlett Sher | Nominated |
| 2023 | Laurence Olivier Awards | Best Set Design | Miriam Buether | Nominated |
