= Peter Filichia =

American theater critic

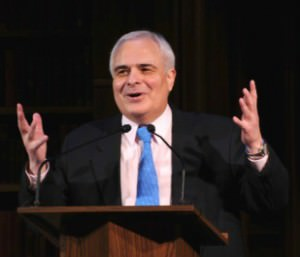
Peter Filichia

Peter Filichia (born 1946) is the former New York-based theater critic for The Star-Ledger newspaper in Newark, New Jersey and New Jersey's television station News 12, as well as for The Asbury Park Press .

In addition, Filichia has two weekly columns at Masterworks Broadway and Kritzerland, and also writes regular entries for the Music Theatre International Marquee blog. He wrote a regular column, "Peter Filichia's Diary," for the website TheaterMania.com from November 2001 until October 2011, and previously for the website BroadwayOnLine.

He is the author of the books Let's Put on a Musical!: How to Choose the Right Show for Your School, Community or Professional Theater, Broadway Musicals: the Biggest Hit and the Biggest Flop of the Season, 1959 to 2009, Broadway MVPs 1960-2010: The Most Valuable Players of the Past 50 Seasons, Strippers, Showgirls and Sharks: A Very Opinionated History of the Broadway Musicals that Did Not Win the Tony Award, and The Great Parade: Broadway's Astonishing, Never-to-Be-Forgotten 1963-1964 Season. At the beginning of his career, Filichia was a columnist for Seventeen and wrote books for teenagers.

He served four terms as president and chairman of the nominating committee of the Drama Desk, and has also been a member of the nominating committee for the Lucille Lortel Awards. He is currently head of the selection committee of the Theatre World Awards and has hosted the annual award ceremony for a number of years.

Filichia has become a playwright with the work Adam's Gifts, a loose contemporary adaptation of Dickens' A Christmas Carol. Productions include Theatre at St. John's in Manhattan, Spotlight Vermont, and the Clinton Area Showboat Theater in Clinton, Iowa. He has also written "God Shows Up", a satire of televangelism, currently in a limited run at Playroom Theater in New York. Filichia's adaptation of Molière's The Bourgeois Gentleman was presented in the 1972 New Jersey Shakespeare Festival.

He has also written the liner notes for many Broadway cast albums, especially reissues of such recordings as Jesus Christ Superstar, Fade Out - Fade In, Subways are for Sleeping, Ankles Aweigh, Redhead, Parade (Jerry Herman), Sweet Charity (Film Soundtrack), Prettybelle, Wish You Were Here and the Roundabout Theatre revival cast recording of 110 In The Shade. Filichia is also the critic-in-residence for the University of Cincinnati College-Conservatory of Music. He has served on an assessment panel for the NEA and is the musical theater judge for the ASCAP Awards program. He has appeared on television with Sally Jessy Raphaël, Phil Donahue, and on Saturday Night Live. In 2004 and 2005, he hosted with Matthew Murray the live theatre discussion show Bitch or Brag About Broadway at New York's 45th Street Theatre.

Since March 2009, he has been on the panel of reviewers heard on the podcast "This Week on Broadway" produced and hosted by James Marino from BroadwayRadio.com.

A fan of baseball and baseball statistics, Filichia claims to have seen 11,000 performances in the theater as of October 1, 2017.
