= Tuck Everlasting (musical) =

2016 musical based on the American children's novel

- 2016 Broadway Playbill
- Music: Chris Miller
- Lyrics: Nathan Tysen
- Book: Claudia Shear and Tim Federle
- Basis: Natalie Babbitt's Tuck Everlasting
- Productions: 2015 Atlanta; 2016 Broadway

Tuck Everlasting is a musical based upon the American children's novel Tuck Everlasting by Natalie Babbitt. It features music by Chris Miller, lyrics by Nathan Tysen and a book by Claudia Shear and Tim Federle, with direction and choreography by Casey Nicholaw. The musical had its premiere at the Alliance Theater in Atlanta, Georgia, in 2015. It began Broadway previews on March 31, 2016; and opened on April 26, 2016, at the Broadhurst Theatre, in New York City. The production closed on May 29, 2016, after 39 performances.

== Synopsis ==
=== Act 1 ===
In 1808, the Tuck family, thirsty and traveling through a forest, comes across a spring and drinks of it. 85 years later, the area near the forest has developed into the town of Treegap, New Hampshire, and the characters sing about what they want most in the world: Winnie Foster, to go to the fair; Mae Tuck, to see her sons again; Jesse Tuck, to take in the familiar sights of Treegap; Miles Tuck, to be unstuck in time; and the Man in the Yellow Suit, to "learn the secret" of Treegap Wood and become immortal ("Live Like This").

Winnie goes into her house, where she spends most of her time with her mother Betsy, and her grandmother. Betsy refuses to let Winnie leave the house, fearing she will suffer the same fate as Winnie's deceased father. Winnie wishes for a life bigger than their living room and wants to explore Treegap Wood ("Good Girl, Winnie Foster").

After running outside once again, Winnie encounters a parade led by the Man in the Yellow Suit that leads to the fair ("Join the Parade"). Desperate to see the fair, Winnie Foster opens the gate and runs into the Wood after the faint sound of a music box ("Good Girl, Winnie Foster (Reprise)").

There she meets Jesse Tuck, who drinks from the spring. To keep her from doing the same, Jesse offers to show her what he calls the top of the world, as seen from the trees ("Top of the World"). After, he and Miles kidnap Winnie and bring her back to the Tucks' house to keep her from revealing their secret.

Back at the Foster home, Betsy has called on Constable Joe and his son Hugo to search for Winnie ("Hugo's First Case, Parts 1 and 2").

The Tucks tell Winnie the history of the Tuck family ("The Story of the Tucks"), explaining that they had all stopped growing or aging the moment they drank from the spring, and because of the reactions of the townspeople, the boys now split up to avoid being recognized, travel the world, and only see each other once every ten years, with Angus and Mae maintaining the homestead on what is now the Fosters' land. Winnie stays the night with the Tucks and, while finding clothes for Winnie to wear, Mae tells her the story of the day when her husband, Angus proposed to her ("My Most Beautiful Day"). Winnie decides that staying in the Tuck family's attic is its own kind of adventure ("The Attic"). Still, she eventually decides to sneak out with Jesse to go to the fair ("Join the Parade (Reprise)").

At the fair, Winnie and Jesse play games and decide to become friends that travel the world together ("Partner in Crime"). The Man in the Yellow Suit attempts to guess Jesse's age and is shocked when he looks in Jesse's eyes. Jesse and Winnie leave the fair and sit on top of the Treegap water tower, where Jesse conceives a plan: allow Winnie to continue to grow for the next six years, then have her drink the water so they will be eternally the same age and they can marry ("Seventeen"). The Man in the Yellow Suit follows the Tucks to get to the enchanted water.

=== Act 2 ===
The Man in the Yellow Suit celebrates his victory with those from the traveling fair ("Everything's Golden") and takes leave to pursue the water. Back at the Tucks' house, Winnie contemplates Jesse's proposal ("Seventeen (Reprise)").

The Tucks discover that Jesse has asked Winnie to drink the water and become angry with him. Winnie talks to Miles about his son Thomas; Miles recalls that his wife became horrified when she noticed the Tucks were not aging, left Miles, and took Thomas with her before he drank the water; Miles notes that he never saw Thomas again and does not know whether he is still alive ("Time"). The Tucks then lament what it means to be stuck in time forever, and aim to live more fully in the coming years ("Time (Reprise)").

The Man in the Yellow Suit blackmails the Fosters into signing over ownership of Treegap Wood (and the spring) to him in exchange for Winnie's safe return ("Everything's Golden (Reprise)"). Constable Joe and Hugo see the Man leaving the Foster home, and remark that you can not trust a man dressed in yellow ("You Can't Trust a Man").

Angus takes Winnie fishing and attempts to convince her to live a mortal life instead of drinking the water with Jesse ("The Wheel"). Miles approaches and tells them that Jesse has gone without saying goodbye, and Winnie says they can find him at the spring in Treegap Wood. There, Jesse encounters the Man in the Yellow Suit who tells him of his long journey to find the spring and forces Jesse to take him there ("The Story of the Man in the Yellow Suit"). The Tucks and Winnie find Jesse, and the Man in the Yellow Suit offers to make them partners in his water-selling business. After the Man takes Winnie hostage, Jesse offers him a vial of water in exchange for her; before he can drink it, however, Mae strikes a fatal blow to the Man's head. When Constable Joe and Hugo arrive, Winnie tells them that she killed the Man in the Yellow Suit in self-defense.

The Tucks abandon the homestead and leave Treegap permanently on Constable Joe's advice. They say goodbye to Winnie and offer her their music box, thanking her for reminding them that there is "still something to live for." Jesse says he will leave instructions on how to find him and leaves her with a vial of water from the spring. Winnie contemplates drinking the water and what it means to live forever ("Everlasting"). She ultimately decides to live out her mortal life and pours the water on her toad instead.

Through a ballet sequence, the ensemble shows the remainder of Winnie's life: she marries Hugo and has a son, to Jesse's disappointment. Each of Winnie's loved ones pass away one by one. Before she dies, Winnie opens the Tucks' music box and dances one last time at the gate of the Foster home as she did when she was young.

The Tucks return to Treegap after Winnie has died and visit her grave, which is dedicated to a "cherished wife, devoted mother, and dearest grandmother." They celebrate the fact that she lived a full life and encounter the toad Winnie made immortal with the water from the spring ("The Wheel (Reprise)").

== Production history and early reviews ==
Tuck Everlasting was originally slated to make its world premiere at the Colonial Theatre, in Boston, Massachusetts, from July 28 to August 28, 2013, with Sadie Sink as Winnie Foster. However, the premiere was cancelled because of "a lack of theatre availability for its planned subsequent production in New York." It subsequently made its world premiere at the Alliance Theater in Atlanta, Georgia. The production ran from January 21 to February 22, 2015.

In its review of the Atlanta production, The New York Times said "Indeed, the most dazzling passage is probably the culminating ballet, wordlessly conveying the circle of life, as it were, without benefit of spectacular puppetry and a familiar pop song. It had the woman next to me repeatedly wiping away tears, and I understood how she felt." Variety said "Despite its existentialism-lite sweep, this is an intimate family story of love, loss and the purpose and power of storytelling in the American folk tradition of Twain and Wilder."

The musical began its Broadway previews on March 31, 2016 at the Broadhurst Theatre, with opening night on April 26, 2016. The production closed on May 29, 2016 after 28 previews and 39 regular performances.

== Musical numbers ==
=== Atlanta premiere ===
The musical numbers which appeared in the original 2015 Alliance Theatre production in Atlanta, were:

- "Live Like This"
- "Good Girl, Winnie Foster"
- "Join the Parade"
- "Top of the World"
- "Story of the Tucks"
- "My Most Beautiful Day"
- "One Small Story"
- "Time"
- "Jump the Line"
- "Seventeen"
- "Everything's Golden"
- "For the Best"
- "You Can't Trust a Man"
- "The Wheel"
- "Everlasting"
- "Everlasting Ballet"

=== Broadway ===
Source: Internet Broadway Database

Act 1:

- "Live Like This"- Mae, Winnie, Angus, Jesse, Miles, Man in the Yellow Suit, Ensemble
- "Good Girl, Winnie Foster" – Winnie, Mothers
- "Join the Parade" – Man in the Yellow Suit, Fair Musicians
- "Good Girl, Winnie Foster (Reprise)" – Winnie
- "Top of the World" – Jesse, Winnie
- "Hugo's First Case" – Hugo
- "Story of the Tucks" – Mae, Jesse, Miles
- "My Most Beautiful Day" – Mae, Angus, Ensemble
- "The Attic" – Winnie
- "Join the Parade" (Reprise) – Man in the Yellow Suit, Ensemble
- "Partner in Crime" – Winnie, Jesse, Ensemble
- "Seventeen" – Jesse, Winnie, Man in the Yellow Suit, Ensemble

Act 2:

- "Everything's Golden" – Man in the Yellow Suit, Ensemble
- "Seventeen" (Reprise) – Winnie
- "Time" – Miles
- "Time (Reprise)" – Miles, Mae, Angus, Jesse
- "Everything's Golden" (Reprise) – Man in the Yellow Suit
- "You Can't Trust a Man" – Constable Joe, Hugo
- "The Wheel" – Angus, Winnie, Ensemble
- "Story of the Man in the Yellow Suit" – Man in the Yellow Suit
- "Everlasting" – Winnie
- "The Story of Winnie Foster" – Orchestra
- "The Wheel" (Reprise) – Company

== Cast and characters ==
Character	Atlanta	Broadway
Character	2015	2016
Winnie Foster	Sarah Charles Lewis	Sarah Charles Lewis
Jesse Tuck	Andrew Keenan-Bolger	Andrew Keenan-Bolger
Mae Tuck	Carolee Carmello	Carolee Carmello
Angus Tuck	Michael Park	Michael Park
Man in the Yellow Suit	Terrence Mann	Terrence Mann
Constable Joe	Bill Buell	Fred Applegate
Miles Tuck	Robert Lenzi	Robert Lenzi
Hugo	Michael Wartella	Michael Wartella
Betsy Foster	Liza Jaine	Valerie Wright
Nana	Shannon Eubanks	Pippa Pearthree

== Critical reception ==
Charles Isherwood of The New York Times gave a positive review, praising the overall family-friendliness and production of the musical. He strongly praised Carmello for her "pure, clarion" singing tone and her interactions with Lewis and Park, as well as the "terrific, ebullient performance" of Mr. Keenan-Bolger playing Jesse.

== Honors and awards ==
=== World Premiere Atlanta production ===
Year	Award Ceremony	Category	Nominee	Result
2015	Suzi Bass Award	Outstanding Musical Production		Won
2015	Suzi Bass Award	Outstanding World Premiere		Nominated
2015	Suzi Bass Award	Outstanding Director	Casey Nicholaw	Nominated
2015	Suzi Bass Award	Outstanding Choreographer	Casey Nicholaw	Nominated
2015	Suzi Bass Award	Outstanding Actress in a Musical	Sarah Charles Lewis	Nominated
2015	Suzi Bass Award	Outstanding Featured Actress in a Musical	Shannon Eubanks	Nominated
2015	Suzi Bass Award	Outstanding Featured Actress in a Musical	Beth Leavel	Nominated
2015	Suzi Bass Award	Outstanding Musical Director	Rob Berman	Nominated
2015	Suzi Bass Award	Outstanding Costume Design for a Musical	Gregg Barnes	Nominated
2015	Suzi Bass Award	Outstanding Scenic Design of a Musical	Walt Spangler	Won
2015	Suzi Bass Award	Outstanding Lighting Design in a Musical	Ken Posner	Won
2015	Suzi Bass Award	Outstanding Sound Design in a Musical	Brian Ronan	Won

=== Original Broadway production ===
Year	Award Ceremony	Category	Nominee	Result
2016	Tony Award	Best Costume Design	Gregg Barnes	Nominated
2016	Outer Critics Circle Award	Outstanding Musical		Nominated
2016	Outer Critics Circle Award	Outstanding Featured Actor in a Musical	Terrence Mann	Nominated
2016	Outer Critics Circle Award	Outstanding Scenic Design	Walt Spangler	Nominated
2016	Drama League Award	Outstanding Production of a Musical		Nominated
2016	Drama League Award	Distinguished Performance	Andrew Keenan-Bolger	Nominated
2016	Fred and Adele Astaire Award	Outstanding Choreographer of a Broadway Show	Casey Nicholaw	Nominated
2016	Fred and Adele Astaire Award	Outstanding Female Dancer in a Broadway Show	Deanna Doyle	Nominated
2016	Theatre World Award		Sarah Charles Lewis	Won
