= Tuck Everlasting (2002 film) =

Film by Jay Russell

- Theatrical release poster
- Directed by: Jay Russell
- Screenplay by: Jeffrey Lieber; James V. Hart
- Based on: Tuck Everlasting by Natalie Babbitt
- Produced by: Marc Abraham; Jane Startz; Thomas Bliss
- Starring: Alexis Bledel; Ben Kingsley; Sissy Spacek; Amy Irving; Victor Garber; Jonathan Jackson; Scott Bairstow; William Hurt
- Cinematography: James L. Carter
- Edited by: Jay Cassidy
- Music by: William Ross
- Production companies: Walt Disney Pictures; Scholastic Studios; Beacon Pictures
- Distributed by: Buena Vista Pictures Distribution
- Release date: October 11, 2002
- Running time: 90 minutes
- Country: United States
- Language: English
- Budget: $15 million
- Box office: $19.3 million

Tuck Everlasting is a 2002 American romantic fantasy drama film directed by Jay Russell and written by Jeffrey Lieber and James V. Hart, based on Natalie Babbitt's 1975 book of the same title. Narrated by Elisabeth Shue, the film stars Alexis Bledel, Ben Kingsley, Sissy Spacek, Amy Irving, Victor Garber, Jonathan Jackson, Scott Bairstow, and William Hurt. Tuck Everlasting was released in the United States on October 11, 2002 by Buena Vista Pictures Distribution. The film received positive reviews from critics and grossed $19.3 million against a $15 million budget.

== Plot ==
In 1914, fifteen-year-old Winnie Foster, who is from an upper-class family in the American town of Treegap, wants to make her own choices in life. After being told that she will go to a boarding school, she runs off into the forest, where she meets Jesse Tuck, who is drinking from a spring at the foot of a great tree. She is kidnapped by his older brother Miles and brought back to the Tucks' home where they tell her they will return her as soon as they can trust her.

She becomes enamored with their slow and simple way of life and falls in love with Jesse. She learns that, by drinking water from a magic spring around a hundred years ago, the Tucks cannot age or be injured, and that they kidnapped her to hide the secret. They tell her that living forever is more painful than it sounds, and that they believe giving away the secret of the spring will lead everyone to want to drink from it and worry it might fall into the wrong hands.

A man in a yellow suit befriends the Fosters while Winnie is gone. He spies on the Tucks and desires the spring to sell the water. He makes a deal to return Winnie in exchange for the forest. He goes to the Tucks and orders them to reveal where the spring is; when they deny any knowledge of it, he threatens Winnie with a pistol. He calls their bluff by shooting Jesse and exposing his immortality; but in return Jesse's mother, Mae, kills him with the butt end of a rifle. A constable arrives and arrests Mae and Angus, her husband and Jesse and Miles' father. Mae is sentenced to be hanged for murdering the man.

After being returned home, Winnie is woken by Jesse, who begs her to help him free his parents. The family fears that if Mae is hanged the next day, she won't die and their immortality will be exposed to the public. Winnie helps Jesse and Miles to break the Tucks out of jail and says goodbye to them. Jesse, who has fallen in love with Winnie, asks her to join them, but Angus warns her that it is dangerous to go with them as they will be hunted. Jesse tells Winnie to drink from the spring so that she will live forever and never age, and that he will come back for her when all is safe, then leaves, promising to love her until the day he dies. After the Tucks depart, Winnie chooses not to drink the water, as Angus warned her that being immortal is far worse than living a typical life and that she should not fear death.

More than 85 years later, in the present day, Jesse returns to Treegap on a motorcycle. He goes into the woods and at the base of the great tree finds Winnie's headstone marking the site where the spring once stood. The stone reads that Winnie became a wife and mother before dying at 100 years of age. Jesse sits at her grave, smiling through his tears and remembering her.

== Cast ==
- Alexis Bledel as Winnie Foster
- Jonathan Jackson as Jesse Tuck
- Ben Kingsley as The Man in the Yellow Suit
- William Hurt as Angus Tuck, Jesse and Miles's father
- Sissy Spacek as Mae Tuck, Jesse and Miles's mother
- Scott Bairstow as Miles Tuck, Jesse's older brother
- Amy Irving as Betsy Foster, Winnie's mother
- Victor Garber as Robert Foster, Winnie's father
- Julia Hart as Sally Hannaway
- Naomi Kline as Beatrice Ruston
- Robert Luis as Night Deputy
- Elisabeth Shue as Narrator

== Production ==
Filming took place from April 23, 2001, to June 11, 2001. The film was shot in Maryland, specifically in Baltimore, Bel Air, and Berlin. The film was filmed in 2.40:1 widescreen.

Charlie Day, Glenn Howerton and Rob McElhenney, the future creators and stars of the long-running sitcom It's Always Sunny in Philadelphia, met during auditions for the film. None of them were cast in the movie.

== Reception ==
=== Box office ===
On a $10 million budget, Tuck Everlasting grossed $19,161,999 in the US and $182,616 in other territories for a worldwide total of $19,344,615. The film was released on VHS and DVD on February 25, 2003. The movie was filmed in Panavision (anamorphic) 2.40:1 widescreen. All DVD copies present the film in its original 2.40:1 widescreen format.

=== Critical response ===
On Rotten Tomatoes, the film received a 61% rating based on 119 reviews, with an average rating of 6.30/10. The critical consensus reads, "Though slow-moving, Tuck Everlasting raises big issues and explores them with sensitivity." On Metacritic, the film has a 66 out of 100, indicating "generally favorable reviews".

Roger Ebert of the Chicago Sun-Times gave the film two stars out of four, writing that the film "is too impressed with its own solemn insights to work up much entertainment value". He further wrote that the film's message was questionable, opining "the injunction to live life fully need not come with a time limit. That's why the outcome of the romance is so unsatisfactory."
