= Alliance Theatre =

Theater company in Atlanta, Georgia

- Interactive map of Alliance Theatre
- Location: 1280 Peachtree Street NE Atlanta, Georgia 30309
- Coordinates: 33.788844°N 84.384914°W

The Alliance Theatre is a theater company in Atlanta, Georgia. It is part of the Robert W. Woodruff Arts Center. The company, originally the Atlanta Municipal Theatre, staged its first production (King Arthur) at the Alliance in 1968. The following year the company became the Alliance Theatre Company.

Within a decade, the company had grown tremendously and staged the world premiere of Tennessee Williams' Tiger Tail and was casting such well-known actors as Richard Dreyfuss, Morgan Freeman, Jane Alexander, Paul Winfield, Robert Foxworth, Jo Van Fleet and Cybill Shepherd. Other world premieres included Ed Graczyk's Come Back to the Five and Dime, Jimmy Dean, Jimmy Dean.

Kenny Leon became artistic director in 1988. Leon's work attracted a larger African-American audience by staging a more diverse selection of productions. During Leon's tenure, the company staged premieres of Pearl Cleage's Blues for an Alabama Sky, Alfred Uhry's The Last Night of Ballyhoo, and Elton John and Tim Rice's musical Aida which went on to Broadway and won the Tony Award for Best Original Musical Score.

Susan V. Booth became the artistic director in 2000. Under her direction, the company produced the Broadway-bound production of the musical The Color Purple, and in 2007 presented Sister Act the Musical. More recent Alliance musical premieres to transfer to Broadway include Bring It On: The Musical, Tuck Everlasting, The Prom, Water for Elephants, and Maybe Happy Ending.

The Alliance Theatre performs in the 650-seat Coca-Cola Stage (formerly Alliance Stage) and the 200-seat Hertz Stage (formerly Studio Theatre), as well as Theatre for Young Audiences offerings. In June 2022, the venue staged the premiere of "Trading Places: The Musical!" directed by Leon and written by Thomas Lennon.
