= Mail.com =

Web portal and web-based email service provider

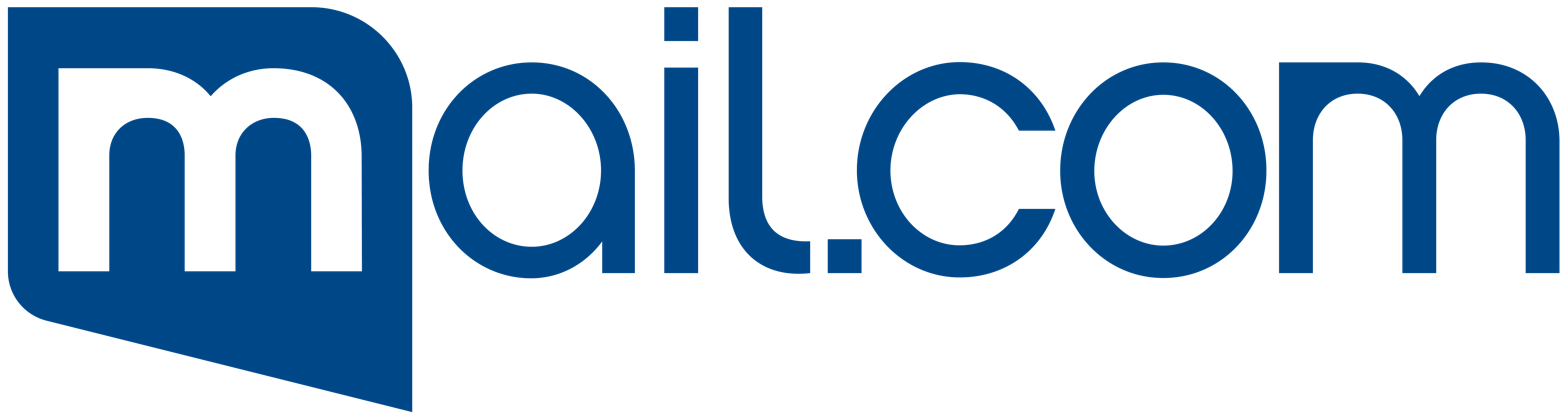
- Company type: Webmail provider
- Available in: English, Spanish, French
- Headquarters: Philadelphia, Pennsylvania, United States of America
- Area served: USA, Europe (Except German-speaking countries). No longer accepts new registration of account in worldwide, including Asia.
- Industry: Internet
- Services: Email, Cloud
- Parent: United Internet
- Website: mail.com
- Advertising: Yes
- Registration: Yes
- Launched: 1995; 31 years ago

mail.com is a web portal and web-based email service provider owned by the internet company 1&1 Mail & Media Inc., headquartered in Philadelphia, Pennsylvania, United States. 1&1 Mail & Media Inc. is a subsidiary of United Internet Group, a publicly listed internet services company based in Montabaur, Germany.

== Services ==
mail.com provides cloud storage and email service with over 100 email domain names for creation of email address. They offer brand-neutral domains, including geographical locations, professions, beliefs and interests.

=== Security ===
mail.com requires a personal phone number to set up an account, and the phone verification is required to enable two-factor authentication (2FA), a form of multi-factor authentication, followed by the configuration of Time-based One-Time Passwords. If 2FA has been enabled for an account, logging in to that email account requires a dynamically generated code.

All mail.com customers' private data stored in the company-owned data center located in Lenexa, Kansas, United States. mail.com uses SSL to ensure secure data transfer via the internet. mail.com offers configuration options to control interest-based advertising and newsletter settings.

mail.com email accounts have an antivirus that scans through emails and attachments, checking for malware. The anti-spam filter also helps detect junk mail and sorts it into the spam folder.

=== Alias email addresses ===
An alias address allows users to customize the sender email address shown in their correspondence by creating an additional email address within an existing mail.com account. Up to ten alias addresses can be registered at the same time, all associated with the main mail.com email account. This feature enables the use of multiple email addresses from a single mailbox.

== History ==
mail.com was originally formed in 1995 as Vanity Mail Services (corporate name Globecomm Inc.), by Gerald Gorman, an investment banker at Donaldson, Lufkin & Jenrette, and Gary Millin, a Harvard Business School student at the time. They spent a majority of Gorman's wealth to register and promote domains, and later began to buy domain names from other companies. At one time the company owned more than 1,200 domains on speculation, including world.com, usa.com, india.com, europe.com, asia.com, doctor.com, scientist.com, and lawyer.com. To raise money to pay the yearly domain registration fees, they offered vanity domain email services to the public from the domains they owned under the brand name iName, and later began hosting mail services on behalf of the owners of other domains, and for Internet service providers. The speculation was often successful. In 1999 the company sold kosher.com, london.com, and england.com for $2 million.

By 1999 the company had raised venture financing from Primus Capital Funds and Sycamore Ventures, and changed its name to mail.com. It conducted an initial public offering in June 1999. By 2000 it was supporting 14.6 million email accounts, mostly for free, and remained unprofitable. It sold the mail.com domain and consumer email services division to Net2Phone, changed its name to Easylink, and changed its business operations to focus on managed file transfer services in April 2001, after acquiring Swift Telecommunications, which in turn had spun off the "EasyLink" business unit from AT&T.

In 2002, AltaVista quit the email service business they had served together with Mail.com under its i-name branding. Addresses using "AltaVista" domains were eventually closed; other email domains once offered by AltaVista remain operational through Mail.com.

In 2004 Jay Penske, son of automobile racing figure Roger Penske, joined and became CEO of Velocity Services, an affinity marketing and Internet services company operating as Interactive Digital Publishing Group. The company acquired the mail.com domain, and re-launched it as a new service in 2007. Parent company Mail.com Media Corporation (MMC) went on to acquire content websites such as Deadline Hollywood, Movieline and the Boy Genius Report.

In September 2010, MMC sold the mail.com email and portal service to United Internet, at the time already Europe's largest internet company, which intended to operate mail.com on its GMX email platform. While existing accounts could be accessed from anywhere, users accessing the site from German-speaking countries could no longer sign up and were instead invited to use United Internet's GMX services geared to those markets (gmx.de, gmx.at, gmx.ch). In purchasing the mail.com brand, United Internet was aiming to leverage the unique character of the mail.com name and its many domains as part of its push for international expansion. At the time of the purchase CEO Jan Oetjen noted, "On the highly competitive international e-mail market, we perceive mail.com as a unique opportunity for differentiation which cannot be copied."

In the first quarter of 2016, mail.com launched a new support and contact portal, offering improved usability and FAQs for its customers. The first mail.com mobile email app for Android users was released in February 2016, complementing its iOS app. A mobile webmailer was also rolled out.

In June 2020, mail.com celebrated its 25th anniversary.
