= Spoiled =

Spoiled may refer to:

- Spoiled (play), a 1971 television and stage play by Simon Gray
- "Spoiled" (song), by Joss Stone, 2005
- "Spoiled", a song by Basement from Colourmeinkindness, 2012
- "Spoiled", a song by Noah Kahan from The Great Divide, 2026
- "Spoiled", a song by Pop Smoke from Faith, 2021

== See also ==
- Spoil (disambiguation)
- Spoilage (disambiguation)
- Spoiler (disambiguation)
- Spoils (disambiguation)
