= Penske (disambiguation) =

Penske Corporation is an American conglomerate operating in the automotive services industry.

Penske may also refer to:

- Penske Media Corporation, an independent digital media and publishing company, based in Los Angeles, California

== People ==
- Roger Penske (born 1937), American businessman and retired professional auto racing driver, owner of Penske Corporation
- Jay Penske, chairman and CEO of Penske Media Corporation, and son of Roger Penske
