= Spoilage =

Spoilage or spoiling may refer to:

- Decomposition, the process by which organic substances are broken down into simpler matter.
  - Food spoilage, the process in which food deteriorates to the point in which it is not edible to humans or its quality of edibility becomes reduced
- Spoilage of evidence, intentional destruction of evidence in a legal case
- Spoiling of a gradient echo magnetic resonance sequence

== See also ==
- Spoil (disambiguation)
- Spoiled (disambiguation)
- Spoiler (disambiguation)
- Spoils (disambiguation)
- Decay (disambiguation)
- Decomposition (disambiguation)
