= Spoiler Alert =

Spoiler Alert may refer to:

- "Spoiler Alert" (How I Met Your Mother), a 2007 TV episode
- "Spoiler Alert" (Lucifer), a 2020 TV episode
- Spoiler Alert: The Hero Dies, a 2017 book by Michael Ausiello

- Spoiler Alert (film), a 2022 film based on the 2017 memoir

== See also ==
- Spoiler (disambiguation)
