= List of awards and nominations received by Jim Parsons =

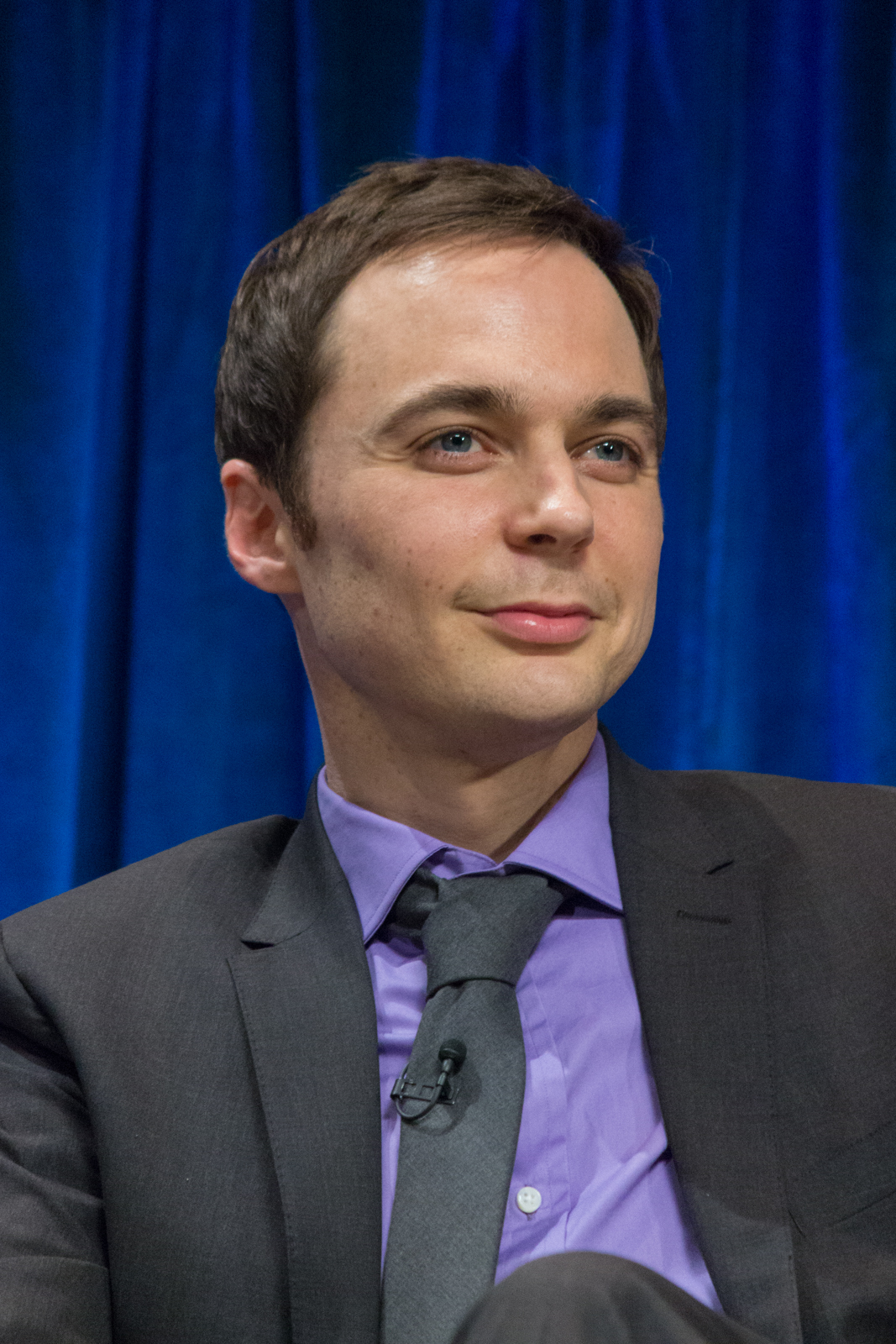
Parsons at PaleyFest in 2013

Jim Parsons is an American actor known for his roles on stage and screen. He has received four Primetime Emmy Awards, a Golden Globe Award, two Critics' Choice Television Awards and Screen Actors Guild Award as well as a nomination for a Tony Award.

Parsons portrayed Sheldon Cooper in the CBS sitcom The Big Bang Theory from 2007 to 2019. For the role he earned four Primetime Emmy Awards for Outstanding Lead Actor in a Comedy Series, two Golden Globe Awards for Best Actor – Television Series Musical or Comedy, and two Critics' Choice Television Awards for Best Actor in a Comedy Series as well as nominations for four Screen Actors Guild Awards for Outstanding Actor in a Comedy Series.

He also received nominations for a Primetime Emmy Award for Outstanding Supporting Actor in a Limited or Anthology Series or Movie for his performances as a gay rights activist in the HBO television film The Normal Heart (2014) and Henry Willson in the Netflix miniseries Hollywood (2020). On film, he played Paul Stafford a scientific head engineer in the biographical drama Hidden Figures (2016), and earned the Screen Actors Guild Award for Outstanding Cast in a Motion Picture alongside Mahershala Ali, Kevin Costner, Kirsten Dunst, Taraji P. Henson, Aldis Hodge, Janelle Monáe, Glen Powell, and Octavia Spencer.

On stage, he was nominated for the Tony Award for Best Featured Actor in a Play in the Paula Vogel play Mother Play (2024).

== Major associations ==
=== Emmy Award ===
Year	Category	Nominated work	Result	Ref.
Primetime Emmy Awards
2009	Outstanding Lead Actor in a Comedy Series	The Big Bang Theory (episode: "The Bath Item Gift Hypothesis")	Nominated	
2010	Outstanding Lead Actor in a Comedy Series	The Big Bang Theory (episode: "The Pants Alternative")	Won	
2011	Outstanding Lead Actor in a Comedy Series	The Big Bang Theory (episode: "The Agreement Dissection")	Won	
2012	Outstanding Lead Actor in a Comedy Series	The Big Bang Theory (episode: ""The Werewolf Transformation")	Nominated	
2013	Outstanding Lead Actor in a Comedy Series	The Big Bang Theory (episode: "The Habitation Configuration")	Won	
2014	Outstanding Lead Actor in a Comedy Series	The Big Bang Theory (episode: "The Relationship Diremption")	Won	
2014	Outstanding Supporting Actor in a Miniseries or Movie	The Normal Heart	Nominated	
2019	Outstanding Short Form Comedy or Drama Series	Special	Nominated	
2020	Outstanding Supporting Actor in a Miniseries or Movie	Hollywood	Nominated	

=== Golden Globe Award ===
Year	Category	Nominated work	Result	Ref.
2011	Best Actor – Television Series: Musical or Comedy	The Big Bang Theory	Won	
2013	Best Actor – Television Series: Musical or Comedy	The Big Bang Theory	Nominated	
2014	Best Actor – Television Series: Musical or Comedy	The Big Bang Theory	Nominated	
2021	Best Supporting Actor – Television	Hollywood	Nominated	

=== Screen Actors Guild Award ===
Year	Category	Nominated work	Result	Ref.
2011	Outstanding Ensemble in a Comedy Series	The Big Bang Theory (season 4)	Nominated	
2012	Outstanding Ensemble in a Comedy Series	The Big Bang Theory (season 5)	Nominated	
2012	Outstanding Male Actor in a Comedy Series	The Big Bang Theory (season 5)	Nominated	
2013	Outstanding Male Actor in a Comedy Series	The Big Bang Theory (season 6)	Nominated	
2013	Outstanding Ensemble in a Comedy Series	The Big Bang Theory (season 6)	Nominated	
2014	Outstanding Ensemble in a Comedy Series	The Big Bang Theory (season 7)	Nominated	
2014	Outstanding Male Actor in a Comedy Series	The Big Bang Theory (season 7)	Nominated	
2015	Outstanding Male Actor in a Comedy Series	The Big Bang Theory (season 8)	Nominated	
2015	Outstanding Ensemble in a Comedy Series	The Big Bang Theory (season 8)	Nominated	
2016	Outstanding Ensemble in a Comedy Series	The Big Bang Theory (season 9)	Nominated	
2016	Outstanding Cast in a Motion Picture	Hidden Figures	Won	

=== Tony Awards ===
Year	Category	Nominated work	Result	Ref.
2024	Best Featured Actor in a Play	Mother Play	Nominated	

== Other theatre awards ==
Organizations	Year	Category	Work	Result	Ref.
Broadway.com Audience Awards	2024	Favorite Featured Actor in a Play	Mother Play	Nominated	
Drama League Awards	2024	Distinguished Performance	Mother Play	Nominated	
Lucille Lortel Award	2024	Outstanding Performer in a Musical	A Man of No Importance	Nominated	
Outer Critics Circle Awards	2024	Outstanding Featured Actor in a Play	Mother Play	Nominated	
Theater World Award	2024	Distinguished Performer	The Normal Heart	Nominated	
Broadway.com Audience Awards	2026	Favorite Featured Actor in a Musical	Titanique	Won	

== Miscellaneous awards ==
Organizations	Year	Category	Work	Result	Ref.
Critics' Choice Television Awards	2011	Best Actor in a Comedy Series	The Big Bang Theory	Won	
Critics' Choice Television Awards	2012	Best Actor in a Comedy Series	The Big Bang Theory	Nominated	
Critics' Choice Television Awards	2013	Best Actor in a Comedy Series	The Big Bang Theory	Nominated	
Critics' Choice Television Awards	2014	Best Actor in a Comedy Series	The Big Bang Theory	Won	
Critics' Choice Television Awards	2019	Best Actor in a Comedy Series	The Big Bang Theory	Nominated	
Dorian TV Awards	2020	Best Supporting TV Performance - Actor	Hollywood	Nominated	
GLAAD Media Awards	2018	Stephen F. Kolzak Award	Himself	Won	
Gold Derby TV Awards	2020	Limited/Series Supporting Actor	Hollywood	Won	
Kids' Choice Awards	2015	Favorite TV Actor	The Big Bang Theory	Nominated	
Kids' Choice Awards	2016	Favorite TV Actor - Family Show	The Big Bang Theory	Won	
Kids' Choice Awards	2018	Favorite TV Actor	The Big Bang Theory	Nominated	
Kids' Choice Awards	2019	Favorite Male TV Star	The Big Bang Theory	Nominated	
Kids' Choice Awards	2020	Favorite Male TV Star	The Big Bang Theory	Nominated	
Online Film & Television Association	2010	Best Actor in a Comedy Series	The Big Bang Theory	Won	
Online Film & Television Association	2011	Best Actor in a Comedy Series	The Big Bang Theory	Won	
Online Film & Television Association	2012	Best Actor in a Comedy Series	The Big Bang Theory	Won	
Online Film & Television Association	2014	Best Actor in a Comedy Series	The Big Bang Theory	Won	
Online Film & Television Association	2020	Best Supporting Actor in a Limited Series	Hollywood	Nominated	
People's Choice Awards	2010	Favorite TV Comedy Actor	The Big Bang Theory	Nominated	
People's Choice Awards	2011	Favorite TV Comedy Actor	The Big Bang Theory	Nominated	
People's Choice Awards	2012	Favorite TV Comedy Actor	The Big Bang Theory	Nominated	
People's Choice Awards	2013	Favorite TV Comedy Actor	The Big Bang Theory	Nominated	
People's Choice Awards	2014	Favorite TV Comedy Actor	The Big Bang Theory	Nominated	
People's Choice Awards	2014	Favorite TV Bromance (with Johnny Galecki, Kunal Nayyar and Simon Helberg)	The Big Bang Theory	Nominated	
People's Choice Awards	2015	Favorite TV Comedic Actor	The Big Bang Theory	Nominated	
People's Choice Awards	2016	Favorite TV Comedic Actor	The Big Bang Theory	Won	
People's Choice Awards	2017	Favorite TV Comedic Actor	The Big Bang Theory	Won	
People's Choice Awards	2018	Comedy TV Star of the Year	The Big Bang Theory	Won	
People's Choice Awards	2019	Male TV Star of the year	The Big Bang Theory	Nominated	
People's Choice Awards	2019	Comedy TV Star of the year	The Big Bang Theory	Nominated	
Satellite Awards	2009	Best Actor – Television Series Musical or Comedy	The Big Bang Theory	Nominated	
Satellite Awards	2010	Best Actor – Television Series Musical or Comedy	The Big Bang Theory	Nominated	
Satellite Awards	2012	Best Actor – Television Series Musical or Comedy	The Big Bang Theory	Nominated	
Satellite Awards	2013	Best Actor – Television Series Musical or Comedy	The Big Bang Theory	Nominated	
Satellite Awards	2014	Best Actor – Television Series Musical or Comedy	The Big Bang Theory	Nominated	
Satellite Awards	2016	Best Ensemble – Motion Picture	Hidden Figures	Won	
TCA Awards	2009	Individual Achievement in Comedy	The Big Bang Theory	Won	
TCA Awards	2010	Individual Achievement in Comedy	The Big Bang Theory	Nominated	
TCA Awards	2012	Individual Achievement in Comedy	The Big Bang Theory	Nominated	
Teen Choice Awards	2010	Choice TV Actor: Comedy	The Big Bang Theory	Nominated	
Teen Choice Awards	2011	Choice TV Actor: Comedy	The Big Bang Theory	Nominated	
Teen Choice Awards	2012	Choice TV Actor: Comedy	The Big Bang Theory	Nominated	
Teen Choice Awards	2013	Choice TV Actor: Comedy	The Big Bang Theory	Won	
Teen Choice Awards	2014	Choice TV Actor: Comedy	The Big Bang Theory	Nominated	
Teen Choice Awards	2015	Choice TV Actor: Comedy	The Big Bang Theory	Nominated	
Teen Choice Awards	2016	Choice TV Actor: Comedy	The Big Bang Theory	Nominated	
Teen Choice Awards	2019	Choice Comedy TV Actor	The Big Bang Theory	Nominated	
TV Guide Award	2013	Favorite Actor	The Big Bang Theory	Won	
