= Michael Ausiello =

American journalist

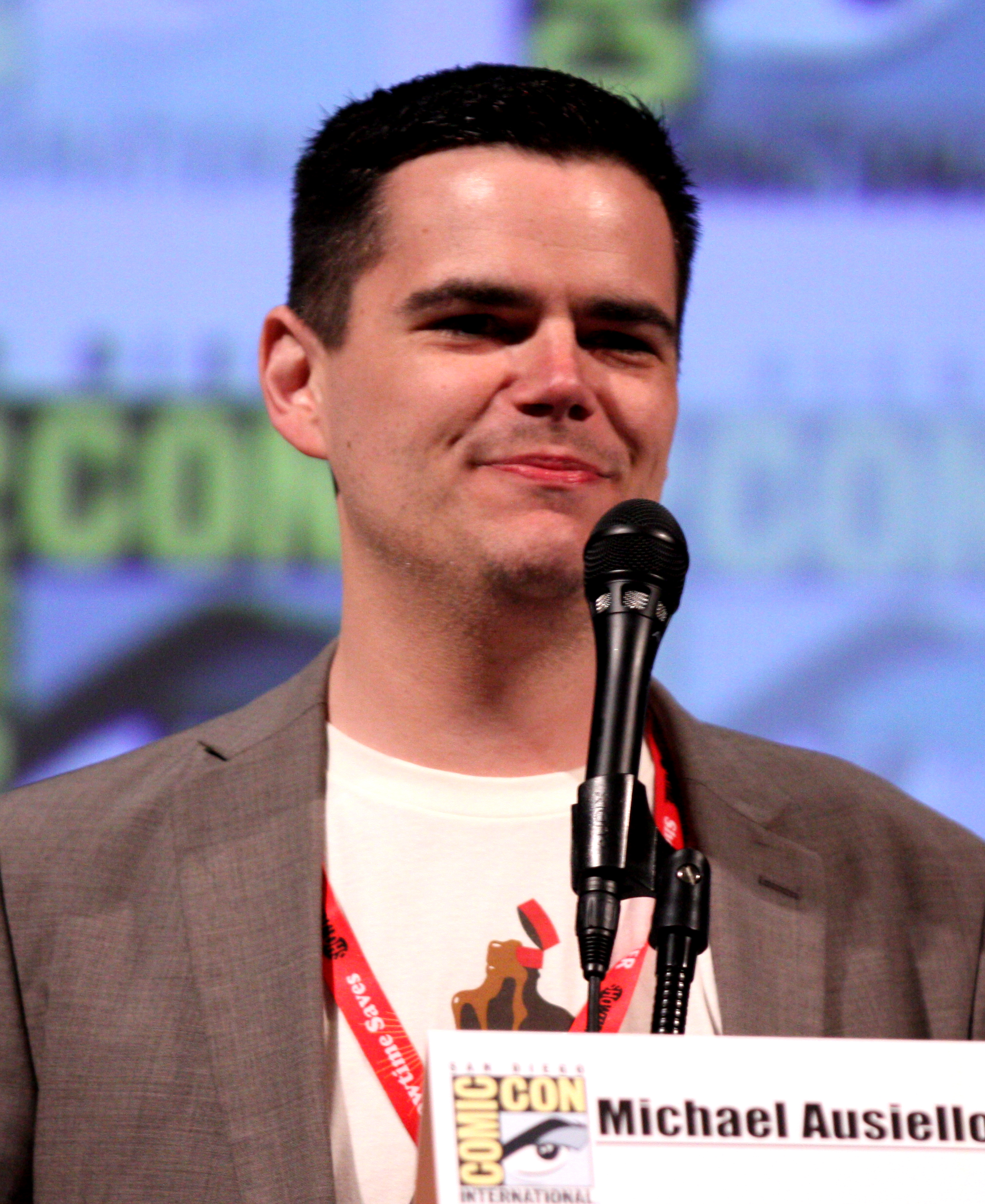
- Ausiello at the 2011 San Diego Comic Con
- Born: February 23, 1972 (age 54); Rahway, New Jersey, U.S.
- Education: University of Southern California
- Occupations: Journalist; actor; founder and editor-in-chief of TVLine
- Spouse: Kit Cowan (m. 2014; died 2015)

Michael Ausiello /ˌɔːsiˈɛloʊ/ (born February 23, 1972) is an American television industry journalist, author, and actor. He was a senior writer at TV Guide and its companion website, TVGuide.com, between 2000 and 2008. From 2008 to 2010, he wrote and reported for Entertainment Weekly before launching his own television news site, TVLine. Ausiello also published a memoir in 2017, Spoiler Alert: The Hero Dies, which was adapted into a film titled Spoiler Alert released in 2022.

== Early life ==
Ausiello grew up in Roselle Park, New Jersey, and attended Roselle Park High School. He is a graduate of the University of Southern California with a BA in journalism.

== Career ==
Ausiello spent three years as the senior news editor of Soaps in Depth magazine and served as media relations coordinator at Entertainment Tonight. He began writing for TV Guide in 2000. During his eight-year tenure at TV Guide, he wrote for both the magazine and its website. Ausiello's columns at TV Guide included Today's News, The Ausiello Report, a weekly print column that expanded into a regularly updated blog online, and Ask Ausiello, an exclusively online weekly Q&A. Ausiello contributed to the website's weekly podcast, TV Guide Talk and the weekly TV Guide Channel program The 411 with a five-minute segment entitled "The Big Five", where he commented on the top five entertainment industry stories of the week. Ausiello also had a vodcast version of The Ausiello Report.

Ausiello has also contributed commentary to media outlets outside of TV Guide, such as Today, Good Morning America, Fox & Friends, American Morning, Inside Edition, Extra, Access Hollywood, and Entertainment Tonight. He is a regular guest every Friday morning on Sirius Satellite Radio's popular morning show, "OutQ in the Morning" (Channel 109) with host Larry Flick, where they converse with callers about all things television—shows, stars, and plot lines, including scoops and spoilers.

Having become friends with actors and producers such as Amy Sherman-Palladino, Ausiello has appeared in a few cameo roles on episodes of television series including Gilmore Girls, Veronica Mars, and Scrubs.

In August 2025 he departed TVLine, which he had launched in 2011.

== Personal life ==
Ausiello is a pescetarian, and resides in New York City. Ausiello is gay and was married to photographer Kit Cowan. Cowan died of a rare form of neuroendocrine cancer on February 5, 2015. Ausiello chronicled the last year of Cowan's life, and their 13-year relationship, in his 2017 memoir Spoiler Alert: The Hero Dies. A film based on that memoir, Spoiler Alert, was released on December 2, 2022, starring Jim Parsons as Ausiello.

== Filmography ==
=== Film ===
Year	Title	Role	Notes
2013	He's Way More Famous Than You	Michael Ausiello	
2022	Spoiler Alert		executive producer

=== Television ===
Year	Title	Role	Notes
2005	Gilmore Girls	Customer	Episode: "But I'm a Gilmore!"
2006	The 411	Correspondent	
2006	Veronica Mars	Blushing Guy	Episode: "The Quick and the Wed"
2007	Extra	Himself	1 episode
2007	Scrubs	Obstetrician	Episode: "My Road to Nowhere"
2007–10	Entertainment Tonight	Himself	10 episodes
2009–10	The Early Show	Himself	2 episodes
2012	Cougar Town	Bartender	Episode: "My Life/Your World: Part 2"
2013	Body of Proof	Grave Digger	Episode: "Daddy Issues"
2015	Cocktails & Classics	Himself	2 episodes
2016	Gilmore Girls: A Year in the Life	Guy Eating Salad in Stairwell	Episode: "Spring"

== Bibliography ==
- Spoiler Alert: The Hero Dies: A Memoir of Love, Loss, and Other Four-Letter Words (2017)

== See also ==
- LGBT culture in New York City
- List of LGBT people from New York City
- New Yorkers in journalism
- NYC Pride March
