= Annalena McAfee =

British children's author and journalist

- Education: Essex University
- Occupations: Children's author and journalist
- Spouse: Ian McEwan (m. 1997)
- Awards: Deutscher Jugendliteraturpreis

Annalena McAfee (born c. 1952) is a British children's author and journalist. She was elected a Fellow of the Royal Society of Literature in 2018.

== Early years and career ==
Annalena McAfee was born in 1952 in London, England, to parents from Glasgow, Scotland. She was educated at Essex University.

In 2003, she served as a judge for the Orange Prize for Fiction, the UK's largest annual literary award. She has also been on the panel for The South Bank Show arts awards, the Ben Pimlott Prize for political writing (2005), The Guardian/Penguin photography competition for cover art (2006), the Samuel Johnson prize for non-fiction, and other awards. Literary festivals where she has spoken include Prague (2003) and Hay-on-Wye (2005). In 2008, she served as a judge for the Orwell Prize (for political writing).

McAfee was the editor of The Guardian's review supplement, the Guardian Review, from 1999 until July 2006, when she resigned to pursue a writing career. Before working for The Guardian, she was a literary journalist at the Financial Times and theatre critic on the Evening Standard.

== Writing ==
McAfee has written a number of children's books, some which have been translated into French, German and Dutch.

Her first novel, The Spoiler, was published in 2011. Anne Sebba noted in The Independent the novel's "extremely funny and sharply observed scenes", and Michiko Kakutani, reviewing it in The New York Times, wrote that "McAfee manages to fuse satire and observation together in a potent brew."

McAfee's "richly textured, playful second novel for adults" was entitled Hame (2017), summed up by literary critic Stuart Kelly as "a curious confection indeed. ... a sweet and quaint novel, full of just-in-time revelations and obvious fondness", and described by reviewer Will Gore as "a novel about identity; both with specific regard to Scottish character and nationalism and to broader questions of how we attach ourselves to people over place, or vice versa, and of how we construct our personal life stories."

About McAfee's next novel, Nightshade, published in 2020. Joanna Briscoe concluded: "The ending is simultaneously overdramatic and yet vastly satisfying. Patience is rewarded, and Nightshade's questions continue to intrigue."

McAfee also edited the anthology Lives and Works (2002), a collection of literary profiles from The Guardian.

== Personal life ==
McAfee married the British novelist Ian McEwan in 1997, having first met him at a 1994 interview she conducted for a profile in the Financial Times.

== Selected works ==
=== Mainstream fiction ===
- The Spoiler (2011)
- Hame (2017)
- Nightshade (2020)

=== Youth titles ===
- Kirsty Knows Best, illustrated by Anthony Browne (1987)
- The Girl Who Got to No. 1 (1991)
- Why Do Stars Come Out at Night?, illustrated by Anthony Lewis (1997)
- Dreamkidz and the Ice Cream that Conquered the World , illustrated by Tony Ross (1998)
- Busy Baby (1999)
- All the Way to the Stars (1995)
- The Visitors Who Came to Stay, illustrated by Anthony Browne (Walker, 2000, ISBN 9780744567731) – awarded the Deutscher Jugendliteraturpreis
- Patrick's Perfect Pet, illustrated by Arthur Robins (2002)
