= Spoil =

Spoil or spoils may refer to:

- Spoils, the proceeds of looting taken from an enemy or victim
- Overburden, or spoil, the material that lies above an area that lends itself to economical exploitation
- Spoil, material removed by earthworks
- Spoil, material removed by dredging
- Spoil, a one percenter in Australian rules football

== See also ==
- Spoilage (disambiguation)
- Spoiler (disambiguation)
- Spolia (Latin, 'spoils'), stones taken from an old structure and repurposed
- "The Spoil", an episode of the TV series Justified
- Spoil tip, a pile built of accumulated spoil removed during mining
