= Penske Motor Group =

American company

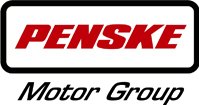
- Type: Private
- Industry: Automotive, Auto Dealerships, Vehicle Parts
- Fate: Acquired by Penske Automotive Group in November 2025
- Headquarters: El Monte, California, US
- Area served: California, Texas
- Key people: Gregory Penske (Chairman/CEO)
- Products: Automobiles
- Services: Financial services, Repair and Maintenance, Collision Repair, Retail parts & accessories
- Parent: Penske Corporation (until 2025); Penske Automotive Group (from 2025)
- Website: www.penskemotorgroup.com

Penske Motor Group is an American automobile dealership group based in El Monte, California. Until November 2025 it was a privately held subsidiary of Penske Corporation run by Gregory Penske, a son of Roger Penske, and it operated Toyota and Lexus dealerships in California and Texas. On November 19, 2025 the publicly listed Penske Automotive Group, a separate company within the same family of businesses, bought the group and its four dealerships.

== Overview ==
Penske Motor Group's flagship dealership is Longo Toyota in El Monte, California, described by Edmunds in 2014 as one of the world's largest car dealerships, with a campus covering the equivalent of about 38 football fields and selling more than 1,000 vehicles a month. It has been the highest-volume Toyota dealership in the United States since it opened.

The company's holdings changed considerably over time: the group ran nine California dealerships across several marques in the late 1990s, six in 2002, and four at the time of its sale in 2025.

The El Monte site combined the group's Toyota and Lexus operations on a single campus. In 2019 it employed roughly 900 people, about 600 on the Toyota side and 300 at the adjoining Lexus store, and the Los Angeles Business Journal put its annual revenue at approximately $450 million. Staff collectively spoke more than 30 languages in 2001 and 41 a decade later, which the dealership's management linked to the demographic mix of the Los Angeles market.

Alongside vehicle sales and service, the campus housed commercial tenants and customer facilities unusual for a car dealership. As of 2014 these included a Starbucks, a Subway outlet, a Verizon Wireless store, a full-service branch of the Automobile Club of Southern California, two Enterprise Rent-A-Car offices, a children's play room and a business centre with internet access; the dealership also delivered vehicles to buyers within 50 miles (80 km) at no charge.

== History ==
=== Founding and transfer to Penske ===
Dominic Longo opened Longo Toyota in El Monte in 1967. By 1972 the business employed 100 people, and in 1976 it became the first Toyota dealership to record 2,000 new-car sales in a year. Longo died in 1985, after which the dealership passed to the Penske organisation; by 1997 it was held by Penske Corporation, then reporting revenues of $4 billion.

The dealership moved to its permanent site beside the San Bernardino Freeway and opened there on January 4, 1988. In 1997 the El Monte property covered 22 acres (89,000 m^{2}), which made Longo Toyota the largest Toyota dealership in the United States by area as well as by sales volume. Gregory Penske, then 34, headed the group, which at that point also included Longo Lexus and Longo Motorcars, a Mercedes-Benz store, both in El Monte, among a total of nine California dealerships.

=== Growth and renaming ===
Longo Toyota headed the Ward's Dealer Business 500 ranking for 2000 with revenues of $487.1 million, delivering 18,172 new vehicles in a market that contained 73 competing Toyota dealerships. Gregory Penske, by then president of the dealership, announced a $10 million programme to rebuild the facility over two years in some fourteen phases, covering the service department, showroom, parts centre and body shop; the plan provided for a Starbucks café and a convenience shop in the service waiting area.

On August 2, 2002, the group acquired the operating assets of Lexus of Stevens Creek, located on Stevens Creek Boulevard in San Jose, California, bringing it to six dealerships and giving it its first presence in the northern Californian market. The others were Longo Toyota, Longo Lexus, Penske Motorcars and Penske Jaguar and Aston Martin in West Covina, and Penske Honda in Ontario.

Until 2007, the El Monte company itself traded as Penske Automotive Group, Inc. It adopted the name Penske Motor Group, Inc. that year, shortly before the publicly listed UnitedAuto Group Inc., also controlled by Penske Corporation, renamed itself Penske Automotive Group, Inc. on July 2, 2007 and changed its ticker symbol to PAG. A spokesman for the listed company confirmed at the time that the two dealership groups remained separate entities.

Douglas Eroh joined Penske Motor Group in 2015 as executive vice-president and became president and general manager of Longo Toyota in November 2018, succeeding Brendan Harrington, who moved to the post of chief operating officer of the group. Longo Toyota sold 14,500 new vehicles in 2018.

=== Sale to Penske Automotive Group ===
On November 19, 2025, a subsidiary of Penske Automotive Group acquired all membership interests in Penske Motor Group, LLC, and with them the group's four franchised dealerships: Longo Toyota and Longo Lexus in El Monte, Lexus of Stevens Creek in San Jose, and Longo Toyota of Prosper in Prosper, Texas. Before the transaction the dealerships were majority owned and run by Gregory Penske, who also served as vice-chairman of the listed company; a further 5 per cent was held by another partner and the remainder by Penske Corporation. Penske Automotive Group had held no interest in them previously.

A filing with the U.S. Securities and Exchange Commission put the purchase price at $519,423,000. Approval by the buyer's board was conditional on a recommendation from a special committee of independent directors, which negotiated the terms, retained its own legal and financial advisers and had the power to reject the transaction. The dealerships had retailed more than 28,000 new and used vehicles in 2024 and were expected to add about $1.5 billion in annualised revenue; existing management was retained, and the purchase brought the listed group to 16 Toyota and seven Lexus franchises.

Roger Penske said the disposal of two Lexus dealerships, in Warwick, Rhode Island and Madison, Wisconsin, had created the opportunity to buy the Penske Motor Group stores along with two further Lexus dealerships in central Florida. Of roughly $1.6 billion in annualised revenue that Penske Automotive Group added through acquisitions and openings during 2025, the Penske Motor Group purchase accounted for the large majority. In October 2026 Penske Automotive Group in turn agreed to be taken private by Penske Corporation and Mitsui & Co., in a transaction valuing it at some $16.3 billion.

== Dealerships ==
At the time of the 2025 sale, the group operated four dealerships. According to Penske Automotive Group, Longo Toyota had been the highest-volume Toyota dealership in the United States for 58 consecutive years, Longo Lexus the highest-volume Lexus dealership in the western United States for 35 years, and Lexus of Stevens Creek the highest-volume Lexus dealership in northern California for 22 years. The San Jose store, which the group had bought in 2002, appears in sources both as Lexus of Stevens Creek and as Lexus Stevens Creek.

== See also ==
- Dave Smith Motors
- Penske Automotive Group
