= Jay Penske =

American businessman

- Born: New York City, U.S.
- Education: Wharton School of the University of Pennsylvania (B.S.)
- Occupations: Businessman, media proprietor, investor
- Known for: Penske Media Corporation
- Spouse: Elaine Irwin (m. 2012; div. 2024)
- Children: 1
- Parent(s): Kathy Penske (mother); Roger Penske (father)
- Relatives: Gregory Penske (half-brother)
- Website: pmc.com/leadership/jay

Jay Penske is an American businessman best known for creating the media company Penske Media Corporation.

== Early life and education ==
Born in New York City, Penske is the youngest son of Kathy, an English school teacher and Roger Penske, the founder and chairman of the Penske Corporation and former race car driver. Penske is an alumnus of St. Mary's Preparatory, in Detroit, Michigan, after having attended Cranbrook, Tabor Academy, and Lawrenceville.

Penske graduated from the University of Pennsylvania's Wharton School with a Bachelor of Science in Management of Information Systems and Finance. He is on the board of the Entrepreneurial School at the Wharton School as of 2007, and is also a member of the University of Pennsylvania Library's board of directors.

== Career ==
Penske co-founded Firefly Mobile, Inc., a wireless company that developed the Firefly mobile phone for children, and other youth targeted mobile devices and products.

Penske also founded and owned Dragon Books, Ltd., a Los Angeles-based antiquarian and used bookstore which sold rare and collectible books which opened for business in 1999, and closed fifteen years later in 2014. It was named after Penske's favorite childhood book, “Dragon, Dragon,” written by John Gardner.

Penske is the chairman and CEO of Penske Media Corporation (PMC), a digital media and publishing company that owns and operates a number of media brands, data services, and live events, including Rolling Stone, Variety, Billboard, The Hollywood Reporter, Deadline, and South by Southwest festival (SXSW). Prior to being named Penske Media Corporation, it began as an affinity marketing and internet services company called Velocity Services, Inc. The company acquired the Mail.com domain which was renamed to the Mail.com Media Corporation (MMC).

Penske joined the board of Vox Media in 2023, after PMC became the largest shareholder of the company.

Penske in 2023 was described by the Los Angeles Magazine on its cover to be “one of the most powerful publishers in the world”, and has been compared to William Randolph Hearst, S.I. Newhouse, and Rupert Murdoch for his acquisition and portfolio of media brands.

=== Motorsports ===
Penske founded an IndyCar Series racing team in 2007, jointly with Steve Luczo, the Chairman of Seagate Technology. In October 2013, Penske Autosport signed an agreement with Formula E Holdings to be the fourth franchise team to enter the new FIA Formula E Championship. The team was runner-up in the 2014-15 season with drivers Jérôme d'Ambrosio (who ranked fourth) and Loïc Duval. Penske Autosport has won the first ever Formula E races in the following countries: Germany, at the Berlin E-Prix (2015); Mexico, at the Mexico City E-Prix (2016); and India, at the Hyderabad E-Prix (2023), and the Jeddah ePrix in 2025

== Controversy ==
Penske Media’s acquisition of the Golden Globe Awards as well as its ownership of Hollywood publications including The Hollywood Reporter, Variety and Deadline has been a source of controversy. In July 2026, Jay Penske and Penske Media were sued by the Hollywood Foreign Press Association (HFPA) which presented the Golden Globes prior to the acquisition by the Penske Media-owned Dick Clark Productions. The federal suit alleges violations of federal and state antitrust laws. It is alleged that this acquisition was done by Penske to influence awards season races. The HFPA is seeking $150 million in damages and the overturning of the agreement which transferred ownership of the Golden Globes to Penske Media.

== Personal life ==
Penske married model Elaine Irwin in 2012. They separated in 2023 and divorced in 2024.
