= Almay =

American cosmetics brand

Almay Inc.
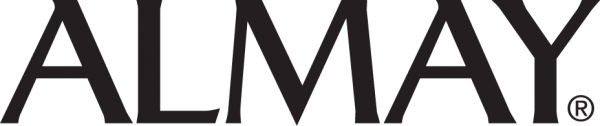
- Industry: Cosmetics
- Founded: 1931; 95 years ago
- Headquarters: New York City, New York, United States
- Key people: Vanessa Solomon (Global General Manager); Carrie Underwood (Global Brand Ambassador)
- Products: Cosmetics
- Parent: Revlon (Rev Holdings, LLC.)
- Website: www.almay.com

Almay is an American cosmetics brand owned by Revlon which markets products toward people with sensitive skin.

== History ==
The Almay Brand was originally established in 1931 and was named after the founders, Alfred and Fanny May Woititz. The creation of this cosmetic brand began when Fanny May Woititz was in need of cosmetic products that did not irritate her sensitive skin. Her husband Alfred, who was a professional chemist, started experimenting with makeup to find ingredients that were purer and gentler. With the help of dermatologist Marion Sulzberger, they developed the first cosmetic brand that used hypoallergenic ingredients.

Almay was the first brand to introduce skincare safety by producing fragrance-free products, by showing all the ingredients used on its product labels, and by testing for allergy, as well as irritation. It was also the first to create a cosmetic line for consumers with specific skin types and those who wear contact lenses. In 1987, Almay was acquired by Revlon and today it has expanded to a full line of skincare and makeup products.

Almay has products for skin, face, lips and eyes. The natural ingredients used include meadowsweet (Filipendula ulmaria) for oily skin, grape seed (Vitis vinifera) for normal skin, and cucumber (Cucumis sativus) for dry skin. Other ingredients in the products include moringa (Moringa oleifera), aloe (Aloe barbadensis), milk thistle (Silybum marianum), licorice (Glycyrrhiza glabra), soybean (Glycine max), and rosehips (Rosa canina).

Elaine Irwin Mellencamp became the spokesperson for Almay in 2004. In 2010, Kate Hudson became a spokesmodel after, and most recently Carrie Underwood.

On June 16, 2022, its parent, Revlon, filed for Chapter 11 bankruptcy.

In April 2026, Almay unveiled a brand refresh with updated packaging and named Miranda Kerr as the global face of the relaunch.

== Cruelty-free cosmetic ==
Almay has not conducted animal testing for over 20 years. The company has eliminated testing in all phases of research, development and manufacturing of all their products. They do not support, nor request that suppliers do animal testing. However, they do obey "local laws" in which countries may require animal testing in order to sell products to customers.

== Controversy ==
In May 2015, the nonprofit organization Truth in Advertising filed complaints with the Federal Trade Commission and the New York Attorney General alleging that Almay’s “Simply American” marketing campaign was misleading to consumers. The FTC and New York Attorney General claimed that the TV and Internet adverts, which depict the former “American Idol” star Carrie Underwood decked out in red, white and blue along with other patriotic imagery, implied that Almay products were made in the United States, when they contain “non-US components”, misleading consumers.

It was revealed that three of the seven makeup products in the Almay’s “Simply American” advertisements were made entirely overseas, in China, Germany and the Czech Republic. Revlon chairman Ron Perelman responded that the adverts neither claimed nor implied that Almay cosmetics are made in America. Perelman said that their products celebrate the “simple, luminous and fresh-faced” look of American beauty, much as rival L’Oréal depicts the “French look”. Perelman also highlighted that the company employs 1,900 workers at its North Carolina manufacturing plant as evidence of its commitment to American jobs.

In 2017, Almay hired a new spokesperson, the half-Black/half-Jewish comedienne and producer Rashida Jones. The brand's marketing director Antoanette Bivona has admitted that "somewhere along the way, Almay lost its way, targeting a small range of skin tones. We need to reach a more diverse audience."

== Spokesmodels ==
Some of the actresses and models that have appeared in Almay advertising include:

- Leslie Bibb
- Gillian Boudreau
- Lisa Butler
- Emily Caillon
- Karen Duffy
- Jennifer Finnigan
- Kathie Lee Gifford
- Lucy Hale
- Eva Herzigova
- Kate Hudson
- Lauren Hutton
- Elaine Irwin
- Rashida Jones
- Milla Jovovich
- Vendela Kirsebom
- Yasmin Le Bon
- Marie-Eve Nadeau
- Stephanie Seymour
- Fabiana Tambosi
- Courtney Thorne-Smith
- Carrie Underwood
