= TVLine =

Website devoted to information about television programs

- Website type: Television news
- Owner: Static Media
- Creator: Michael Ausiello
- Website: www.tvline.com
- Launched: 2011

TVLine is a website devoted to information, news, and spoilers of television programs. It covers various topics including the latest news on television, reviews, latest releases, and more.

== History ==
In late 2010, Entertainment Weekly's Michael Ausiello announced that he would be leaving EW after nearly two years in their employ to establish a TV-centered website with PMC, the media company founded by Jay Penske. He later announced that fellow EW writer Michael Slezak, E! Online's Megan Masters, and TV Guide's Matt Mitovich would be joining him in the venture.

The site debuted January 5, 2011, and more than tripled initial expectations for internet traffic in its first six days.

In early 2011 a report by TV by the Numbers analyzed the pageview ratings for four television websites: TVLine, its sister site Deadline, TheWrap, and TV by the Numbers itself. With a high of just over 1 million daily pageviews, TVLine beat all three competitors. A similar report in summer 2012 compared TVLine again to three other websites: Deadline, The Hollywood Reporter, and HitFix. TVLine hit a high of approximately 23 million monthly pageviews, second only to The Hollywood Reporter.

In August 2025, Penske Media Corporation sold the site to Static Media, with the original founder Michael Ausiello and Chief Content Officer Matt Mitovich departing the site.

== Audience and reach ==
Until 2025, PMC claimed that TVLine attracted approximately 12 million unique digital unique users, around 364 million video views, and a social media presence with about 1.6 million followers across various platforms.
