= Elaine Irwin =

American model (born 1969)

- Born: August 26, 1969 (age 57); Gilbertsville, Pennsylvania, U.S.
- Occupation: Model
- Spouse(s): John Mellencamp (m. 1992; div. 2011) Jay Penske (m. 2012; div. 2024)
- Modeling information
- Height: 1.80 m (5 ft 11 in)
- Hair color: Blonde
- Eye color: Blue
- Agency: IMG Models (New York, Los Angeles); d'management group (Milan); Mega Model Agency (Hamburg); Front Management (Miami)

Elaine Irwin (born August 26, 1969) is an American model. She was the face of Almay Cosmetics and Ralph Lauren.

== Early life and career ==
Elaine Irwin was born in Gilbertsville, Pennsylvania. She left home when she was 16 to pursue a modeling career. She was discovered by photographer Paul Pelak and his wife Margaret while enrolled at John Casablancas in 1985. After her photo appeared in Seventeen in 1985, the Boyertown honor student and varsity letter-winner in track and cross country was a much sought-after face for magazine covers, advertisements and commercials.

In 1989 she appeared in the music video for New Order's "Round & Round" off their 1989 album Technique. Within a few years, she became one of the Ford Models and appeared on the cover of dozens of fashion magazines, including Cosmopolitan, Glamour, Self and Elite. Her American Beauty Vogue cover was shot by Richard Avedon.

She made her move onto the runway for Victoria's Secret, Thierry Mugler, Versace, Prada and Calvin Klein and soon became a subject of photographers Herb Ritts, Irving Penn, and Steven Meisel.

Irwin became the first woman to drive the pace car at the Indianapolis 500 in May 2001. She was an at-large delegate to the 2004 Democratic National Convention. Also in 2004, it was announced that Almay Cosmetics, owned by Revlon, selected Irwin as their spokesmodel and signed her to a seven-year contract to represent the brand.

== Personal life ==
Irwin was 23 years old when she married musician John Mellencamp on September 5, 1992. The two met when she was hired to appear on the cover of Mellencamp's Whenever We Wanted album (and appear in the music video for "Get A Leg Up"). Within 10 weeks, they were engaged. They have two sons.

On December 30, 2010, it was announced that she and Mellencamp were separating after eighteen years of marriage, but both chose to stay in Indiana to raise their two children. On January 14, 2011, John Mellencamp filed for divorce and requested that Elaine be returned to her maiden name 'Irwin'. On August 12, 2011, their divorce was finalized.

In October 2012, Irwin became engaged to racecar team owner and media businessman Jay Penske. They had a daughter in May 2013. Irwin has resided in California since 2013.
