= Spoiler Alert: The Hero Dies =

2017 memoir by Michael Ausiello

- Author: Michael Ausiello
- Language: English
- Genre: Memoir
- Publisher: Atria Books
- Publication date: September 12, 2017
- Publication place: United States
- Pages: 320
- ISBN: 9781501134975

Spoiler Alert: The Hero Dies is a 2017 memoir by Michael Ausiello about his marriage to Kit Cowan, who died of terminal cancer in 2015. The book is based on Ausiello's relationship with Kit Cowan, who battled with aggressive neuroendocrine cancer. Upon its release, the book was generally well received by critics, who praised its humor and poignancy. It was adapted into the 2022 film Spoiler Alert.

== Background ==
The memoir is based on journalist Michael Ausiello's fourteen-year relationship with Kit Cowan, and the latter's eleven-month battle with aggressive neuroendocrine cancer. An editor at Simon & Schuster became interested in the updates about Cowan's health and their relationship that Ausiello posted on his Facebook page. Cowan died in February 2015, and the editor reached out to Ausiello about writing a book about his experiences a few months later. Ausiello decided to write the memoir as a way to remember Cowan, a process which seemed "almost [...] masochistic" to him at the time. The memoir covers their relationship from their first meeting until Cowan's death. It includes their struggles with issues such as infidelity and Cowan's marijuana use. In an interview with Instinct, Ausiello stated that he did not want to write a "fairy tale, sugar coated version of what happened."

== Reception ==
=== Critical reception ===
The book received mostly positive reviews from critics. In a review for The Gay & Lesbian Review Worldwide, Terri Schlichenmeyer praised the book's ironic humor and candid exploration both their relationship and the realities of caring for a terminally ill partner. J. Corbett Holmes of The Desert Sun praised its mix of humor, sentiment and tragedy. Lincee Ray of the Associated Press wrote that the book was "simultaneously poignant and shockingly funny."

It received a positive review from Kirkus Reviews, which wrote that it was "grounded in the realities of modern relationships and the grim fate of mortality." Publishers Weekly praised its content, but felt that the writing was at times "too airy."

=== Other ===
A number of celebrities endorsed the book, including Andy Cohen, Andrew Rannells, and J. J. Abrams.

== Film adaptation ==
The 2022 American biographical and romantic drama film Spoiler Alert is based on the memoir. The film stars Jim Parsons and Ben Aldridge.
