= An Act of God =

Play written by David Javerbaum

- Written by: David Javerbaum
- Original language: English

Premiere
- Date premiered: May 28, 2015
- Place premiered: Studio 54; New York City
- Official website

An Act of God is a play by David Javerbaum. The stage play is adapted from Javerbaum's The Last Testament: A Memoir By God.

== Background ==
The play began as a "series of tweets" (specifically, an alleged Twitter account for God) and a book before being written as a play.

== Productions ==
The play began previews for its initial run on Broadway at Studio 54 on May 7, 2015, and opened officially on May 28 for a limited run through August 2. Jim Parsons starred as God in the production directed by Joe Mantello and produced by Jeffrey Finn. The play featured Tim Kazurinsky as archangel Gabriel, and Christopher Fitzgerald as archangel Michael.

The show returned to Broadway at the Booth Theatre for a limited engagement starring Sean Hayes. The production began previews on May 28, 2016, with an opening on June 6. The run closed on September 4, 2016, after 90 performances. Hayes previously performed in the play at the SHN Golden Gate Theatre, San Francisco and the CTG/ Ahmanson Theatre, Los Angeles (in February 2016).

An adaptation of the show to Spanish is currently playing at Julio Prieto Theatre in Mexico City starring Horacio Villalobos. The show was adapted by Villalobos himself along with Pilar Boliver, the director of the show. The production began previews on October 6, 2017, opening on October 20. David Javerbaum assisted to the opening show.

The show premiered in Australia in 2018, for the Sydney Mardi Gras, at the Eternity Playhouse, starring Mitchell Butel. The show opened on February 2, 2018, and closed on February 25, 2018.

== Response ==
Charles Isherwood, reviewing the Sean Hayes production in The New York Times, called the play "a gut-busting-funny riff on the never-ending folly of mankind’s attempts to fathom God’s wishes through the words of the Bible and use them to their own ends."

The TheaterMania reviewer of the Hayes production called the play "still just mildly amusing...The major difference in this presentation comes in the form of Hayes, who brings an extra touch of frivolity to a play that really calls for it."

== Awards and nominations ==
=== Original Broadway production ===
Year	Award ceremony	Category	Nominee	Result
2016	Drama Desk Award	Outstanding Sound Design of a Play	Fitz Patton	Nominated
