= Spoiler Alert (film) =

2022 film by Michael Showalter

- Theatrical release poster
- Directed by: Michael Showalter
- Screenplay by: David Marshall Grant; Dan Savage
- Based on: Spoiler Alert: The Hero Dies by Michael Ausiello
- Produced by: Jim Parsons; Todd Spiewak; Alison Mo Massey; Michael Showalter; Jordana Mollick
- Starring: Jim Parsons; Ben Aldridge; Sally Field
- Cinematography: Brian Burgoyne
- Edited by: Peter Teschner
- Music by: Brian H. Kim
- Production companies: That's Wonderful Productions; Semi-Formal Productions
- Distributed by: Focus Features
- Release date: December 2, 2022
- Running time: 112 minutes
- Country: United States
- Language: English
- Box office: $1.4 million

Spoiler Alert is a 2022 American romantic comedy-drama film based on the 2017 memoir Spoiler Alert: The Hero Dies by Michael Ausiello, directed by Michael Showalter and written by David Marshall Grant and Dan Savage. The film stars Jim Parsons, Ben Aldridge, and Sally Field.

Spoiler Alert was released in the United States by Focus Features on December 2, 2022.

== Plot ==
In 2001, Michael Ausiello, a writer for TV Guide, is brought to a gay nightclub by his best friend in Manhattan. There, he meets photographer Kit Cowan, and the two start dating. Early in the relationship, Michael feels insecure about not feeling attractive enough for Kit, being previously overweight. Kit later reveals that he had an affair. They both admit their fears of being in a long-term relationship since neither of them had been in one before, but they continue to date. During their first Christmas together, Kit gives Michael his own closet space at his apartment.

One year later, Kit gets an appendectomy. His parents come to Manhattan, and Kit has yet to come out to them. Kit's mother, Marilyn, grows suspicious of Michael. After she incessantly interrogates him, Kit comes out to his parents and reveals that Michael is his boyfriend. While initially upset that Kit could not admit this to her, Marilyn is accepting and welcomes Michael. Michael and Kit continue their relationship and move into a townhouse together. During their second Christmas, Kit joins Michael in lying under the Christmas tree with him as Michael explains it was a childhood fantasy of his to do it every year with his partner.

In 2013, Michael and Kit develop complications in their relationship as their sex life deteriorates. Michael spends too much time with his company TVLine and becomes an alcoholic. He also suspects Kit is having an affair with his coworker, Sebastian. Their therapist believes they now resent each other, but they still love each other enough to want to continue their relationship. He suggests that they separate to reassess their feelings. Kit moves out, but the two remain in their relationship.

During their thirteenth Christmas, Kit begins showing signs of ill health. In 2014, Kit is diagnosed with a rare form of stage-4 neuroendocrine cancer. Michael, still traumatized by his mother's death from cancer, moves Kit back in and supports him during his treatment. Kit's health worsens, and he is given six weeks left to live. Michael apologizes to Kit for his fear of being left for a more attractive man. Kit apologizes to Michael for having an affair with Sebastian. Kit proposes to Michael and they marry the next day. The two spend their last Christmas together, with Michael imagining himself and Kit growing old and lying under the Christmas tree together.

In 2015, Kit is taken to the hospital. As Kit nears death, Michael allows Sebastian to say goodbye to him. As Kit is dying, Michael fantasizes interviewing Kit as a departing actor whose character is being killed off a television show. Kit expresses gratitude for his "time on the show" and is looking forward to the future. Michael asks Kit what he should do, and Kit assures him that he will figure it out. Back in reality, Michael thanks Kit for giving him a family. After Kit's death, Michael remains in Bob and Marilyn's lives. As Michael prepares to leave New York for Los Angeles, he is nervous to start his new journey, but remembers how brave he was to begin his adventure with Kit.

== Cast ==
- Jim Parsons as Michael Ausiello
- Ben Aldridge as Kit Cowan
- Sally Field as Marilyn Cowan
- Bill Irwin as Bob Cowan
- Antoni Porowski as Sebastian
- Nikki M. James as Nina
- Jeffery Self as Nick
- Tara Summers as Mrs. Ausiello
- Shunori Ramanathan as Dr. Lucas
- Paco Lozano as Judge
- Sadie Scott as Kirby
- Brody Caines as Young Michael

== Production ==
Production began in December 2018, when Jim Parsons signed on to produce and star in the film and Michael Showalter signed on to direct it. In July 2021, Ben Aldridge was cast as Kit Cowan. In September 2021, Sally Field joined the cast playing Kit's mother, Marilyn. Principal photography began in the fall in New York City.

== Release ==
The film was given a limited release by Focus Features on December 2, 2022, before releasing across the United States a week later on December 9, 2022.

=== Home media ===
Spoiler Alert was released for VOD on December 20, 2022, followed by a Blu-ray and DVD release on February 7, 2023.

== Reception ==
=== Box office ===
The film made $679,690 from 789 theaters in its opening wide weekend, finishing in 10th.

=== Critical response ===
On the review aggregator website Rotten Tomatoes, 87% of 93 critics' reviews are positive, with an average rating of 6.8/10. The website's consensus reads: "It can be frustratingly uneven, but strong performances from a talented cast help Spoiler Alert stay on the right side of saccharine." Metacritic, which uses a weighted average, assigned the film a score of 61 out of 100, based on 22 critics, indicating "generally favorable" reviews. PostTrak reported 91% of audience members gave the film a positive score.

=== Accolades ===
Award	Date of ceremony	Category	Recipient(s)	Result	Ref.
GLAAD Media Awards	March 30, 2023	Outstanding Film - Wide Release	Spoiler Alert	Nominated	
Casting Society Artios Awards	March 9, 2023	Outstanding Achievement in Casting - Studio or Independent Feature - Comedy	Avy Kaufman	Nominated	
Guild of Music Supervisors Awards	March 5, 2023	Best Music Supervision for Film Budgeted $25 Million And Under	Natalie Hayden, Garrett McElver	Nominated	
The Queerties	February 28, 2023	Studio Movie	Spoiler Alert	Nominated	
The Queerties	February 28, 2023	Performance - Film	Ben Aldridge	Nominated	
The Queerties	February 24, 2022	Next Big Thing	Spoiler Alert	Nominated	

== See also ==
- LGBT culture in New York City
- List of LGBT people from New York City
