= Gregory Penske =

American businessman

Gregory Penske is the chairman and CEO of Penske Motor Group, which owns and operates Toyota and Lexus dealerships in California and Texas in the United States.

== Early life ==
Penske grew up in Philadelphia and graduated from Cornell University, where he earned a degree in business management. He also attended General Motors Institute (now Kettering University) and worked at Chevrolet and Cadillac-Oldsmobile dealerships while in college. He is the son of Roger Penske, the billionaire founder and chairman of the Penske Corporation and owner of the auto racing team Team Penske.

== Career ==
Penske is the former president and CEO of Penske Motorsports, which operated racetracks across the country, including the development of the Auto Club Speedway (formerly California Speedway) in Fontana, California. He is on the board of directors for Penske Corporation, Penske Automotive Group (as vice-chairman), Penske Motor Group (as chairman and CEO), Penske Entertainment (as vice-chairman). He is an owner of the Indianapolis Motor Speedway, NTT IndyCar Series, IMS Productions; Petersen Automotive Museum and Friends of Golf. He is a member of the Toyota Parts and Service Advisory Council, Toyota President's Cabinet, Toyota Board of Governors, and Lexus League of Elite Dealers.

Penske is a former member of the Board of Directors of the Alltel Corporation, Ares Capital Corporation, International Speedway Corporation, Los Angeles Sports Council, the LA 2024 Olympic Committee, and the Board of Trustees of the John Thomas Dye School.

== Awards ==
Penske received the Young Leadership and Excellence Award from the Automotive Hall of Fame in 1997.
