= The Spoiler (novel) =

2011 dark comedy novel by Annalena McAfee

- First edition cover of the 2011 hardback
- Author: Annalena McAfee
- Language: English
- Genre: Comedy
- Publisher: Harvill Secker (UK), Knopf (USA)
- Publication date: 2 May 2011 (UK), 10 April 2012 (USA)
- Publication place: United States
- Media type: Print (Hardback & e-book)
- Pages: 320 pp (first edition, hardback)
- ISBN: 1846554357 (first edition, hardback)

The Spoiler is a 2011 dark comedy novel written by British author Annalena McAfee. The novel was first published by Harvill Secker on 2 May 2011, with Knopf republishing the book in the United States on 10 April 2012.

== Synopsis ==
The Spoiler is set in London during the 1990s and follows two female journalists. Honor Tait is an eighty-year-old seasoned veteran while Tamara Sim is a new graduate that puts together lists for a gossip newspaper. Tamara is sent to interview Honor, with the intent to dish on her personal life. However, the elderly woman is known for being tricky and isn't willing to give up details about her private life without a fight. As the two women clash and each paper is out to get the highest amount of sales, the stakes get higher and more desperate.

== Reception ==
Reviews for The Spoiler have been mostly positive, with the London Evening Standard stating that the novel was "strikingly entertaining". The New York Times positively reviewed the book, calling it "spirited if at times heavy-handed". The Independent and Guardian both praised the novel, with the Guardian remarking that it was a "witty and entertaining debut about two very different worlds of journalism". Entertainment Weekly gave The Spoiler a B+ rating, with NPR calling it "satisfying". The Globe and Mail also positively reviewed The Spoiler.
