= EasyLink =

EasyLink is a trade name which may refer to several technologies:

- The EasyLink trade name used by Philips for the Consumer Electronics Control (CEC) feature of the HDMI standard, used to control connected multimedia devices.
- The EasyLink service, one of the first marketable computer-based email systems for non-government users made by Western Union. This service has since been known as AT&T's PersonaLink, Mail.com, EasyLink Services International Corporation, and since 2012, OpenText.
