= Jim Parsons =

American actor (born 1973)

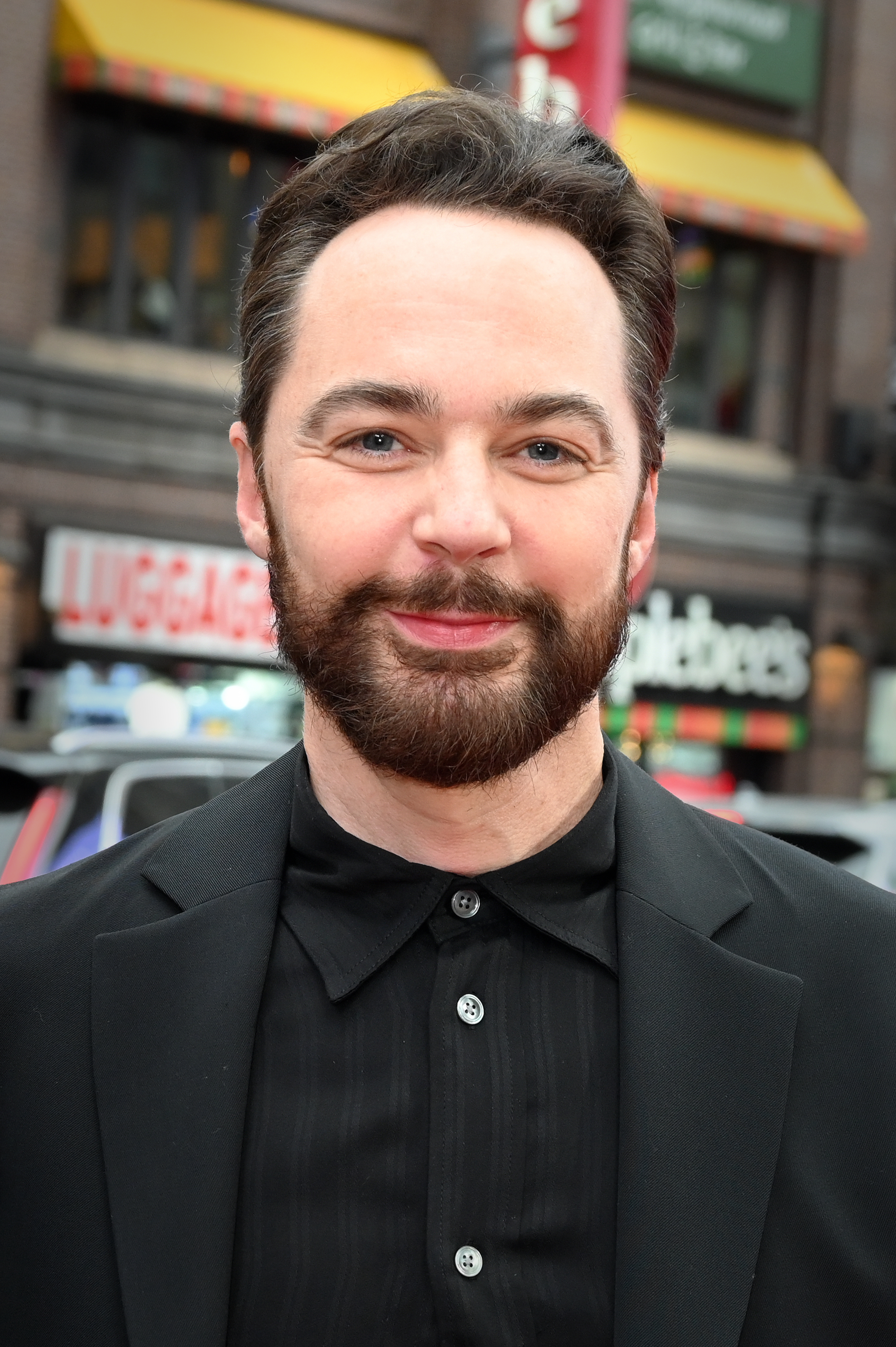
- Parsons in 2025
- Born: James Joseph Parsons; March 24, 1973 (age 53); Houston, Texas, U.S.
- Education: University of Houston (BA); University of San Diego (MFA)
- Occupations: Actor; producer
- Years active: 1993–present
- Spouse: Todd Spiewak (m. 2017)
- Awards: Full list

James Joseph Parsons (born March 24, 1973) is an American actor. Known for his work on both stage and screen, his accolades include four Primetime Emmy Awards, a Golden Globe Award, and a nomination for a Tony Award. From 2015 to 2018, Forbes named him the world's highest-paid television actor.

A graduate of the University of Houston and the University of San Diego, Parsons started his career on the stage and had his screen debut in 2002. He played Sheldon Cooper in the CBS sitcom The Big Bang Theory (2007–2019), winning four Primetime Emmy Awards for Outstanding Lead Actor in a Comedy Series. He was further Emmy-nominated for the television film The Normal Heart (2014), the short form series Special (2019), and playing Henry Willson in the Netflix miniseries Hollywood (2020).

Following his breakthrough, Parsons gained wider recognition with his Broadway debut in the Larry Kramer play The Normal Heart (2011) and later received a nomination for the Tony Award for Best Featured Actor in a Play for his role in Mother Play (2024). He has also acted in the Broadway plays Harvey (2012), An Act of God (2015), The Boys in the Band (2018), and Our Town (2024). Alongside a lead voice role in the animated comedy film Home (2015), he also played supporting roles in Hidden Figures (2016), A Kid Like Jake (2018), Extremely Wicked, Shockingly Evil and Vile (2019), The Boys in the Band (2020), and Spoiler Alert (2022).

== Early life and education ==
James Joseph Parsons was born on March 24, 1973 at St. Joseph Medical Center in Houston, Texas, and was raised in one of its northern suburbs, Spring. He is the son of Milton Joseph "Mickey/Jack" Parsons Jr. and teacher Judy Ann (née McKnight). His younger sister, Julie Ann Parsons, is also a teacher.

After playing the role of the Kola-Kola bird in a school production of The Elephant's Child at age six, Parsons was determined to become an actor. He attended Klein Oak High School in Spring. Parsons points to a role in Noises Off during his junior year as the first time "I fully connected with the role I was playing and started to truly understand what it meant to be honest on stage." The young Parsons was heavily influenced by sitcoms, particularly Three's Company, Family Ties, and The Cosby Show.

After graduating from high school, Parsons earned a BA degree in Theater from the University of Houston. He was prolific during this time, appearing in 17 plays in three years. He was a founding member of Infernal Bridegroom Productions and regularly appeared at the Stages Repertory Theatre. Parsons enrolled in graduate school at the University of San Diego in 1999. He was one of seven students accepted into a special two-year course in classical theater, taught in partnership with the Old Globe Theater. Program director Rick Seer recalled having reservations about admitting Parsons, saying, "Jim is a very specific personality. He's thoroughly original, which is one reason he's been so successful. But we worried, 'Does that adapt itself to classical theater? Does that adapt itself to the kind of training that we're doing?' But we decided that he was so talented that we would give him a try and see how it worked out."

Parsons enjoyed his schooling so much, he told an interviewer that he would have pursued a doctorate in acting if possible: "School was so safe!.....You frequently would surprise yourself by what you were capable of, and you were not surprised by some things." Parsons graduated with an M.F.A. degree in acting from Old Globe Theatre/University of San Diego in 2001 and moved to New York.

Parsons traced his family's history on TLC's Who Do You Think You Are? in September 2013, and discovered French heritage from his father's side. The French architect Louis-François Trouard is his sixth great-grandfather.

== Career ==
=== 2003–2006: Early roles ===
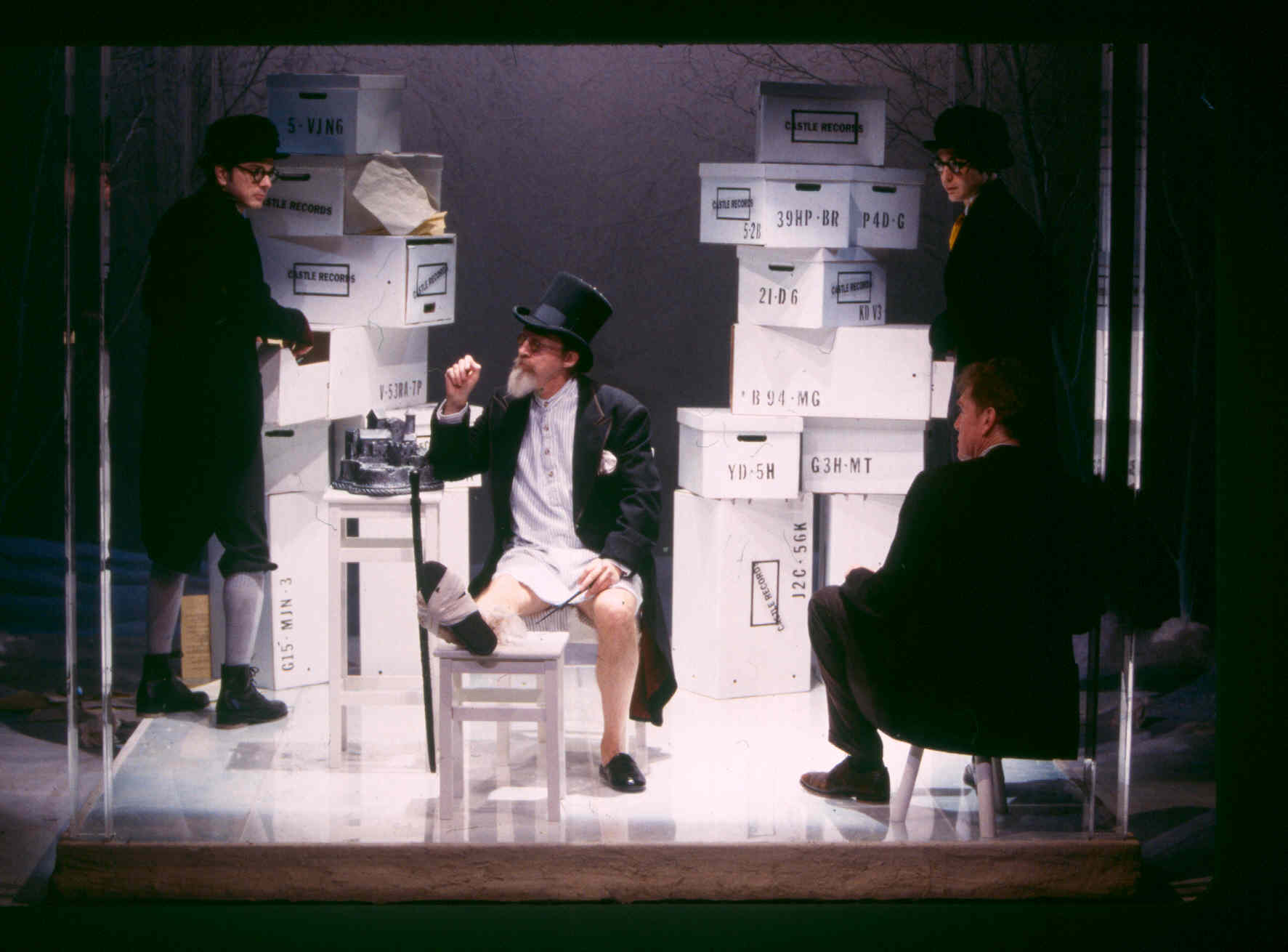
Parsons (back right) in a play adaptation of The Castle in 2002

In New York, Parsons worked in Off-Broadway productions and made several television appearances. In a 2003 Quiznos commercial, Parsons played a man who had been raised by wolves and continued to nurse from his wolf "mother". He had a recurring role on the television show Judging Amy and appeared on the television series Ed. Parsons also had minor roles in several movies, including Garden State and School for Scoundrels.

=== 2007–2019: The Big Bang Theory and theatre roles ===
Parsons has estimated that he auditioned for between 15 and 30 television pilots, but on many of the occasions when he was cast, the show failed to find a television network willing to purchase it. The exception came with The Big Bang Theory. After reading the pilot script, Parsons felt that the role of Sheldon Cooper would be a very good fit for him. Although he did not feel any sort of relationship with the character, he was enchanted by the dialogue structure, the way the writers "brilliantly use those words that most of us don't recognize to create that rhythm, and the rhythm got me. It was the chance to dance through that dialogue and in a lot of ways still is." In his audition, Parsons impressed series creator Chuck Lorre, who insisted on a second audition to see if Parsons could replicate the performance. Parsons was cast as Sheldon Cooper, a physicist with social apathy who frequently belittles his friends. The role required Parsons to "rattle off line after line of tightly composed, rhythmic dialogue, as well as then do something with his face or body during the silence that follows." Parsons credits his University of San Diego training with giving him the tools to break down Sheldon's lines.

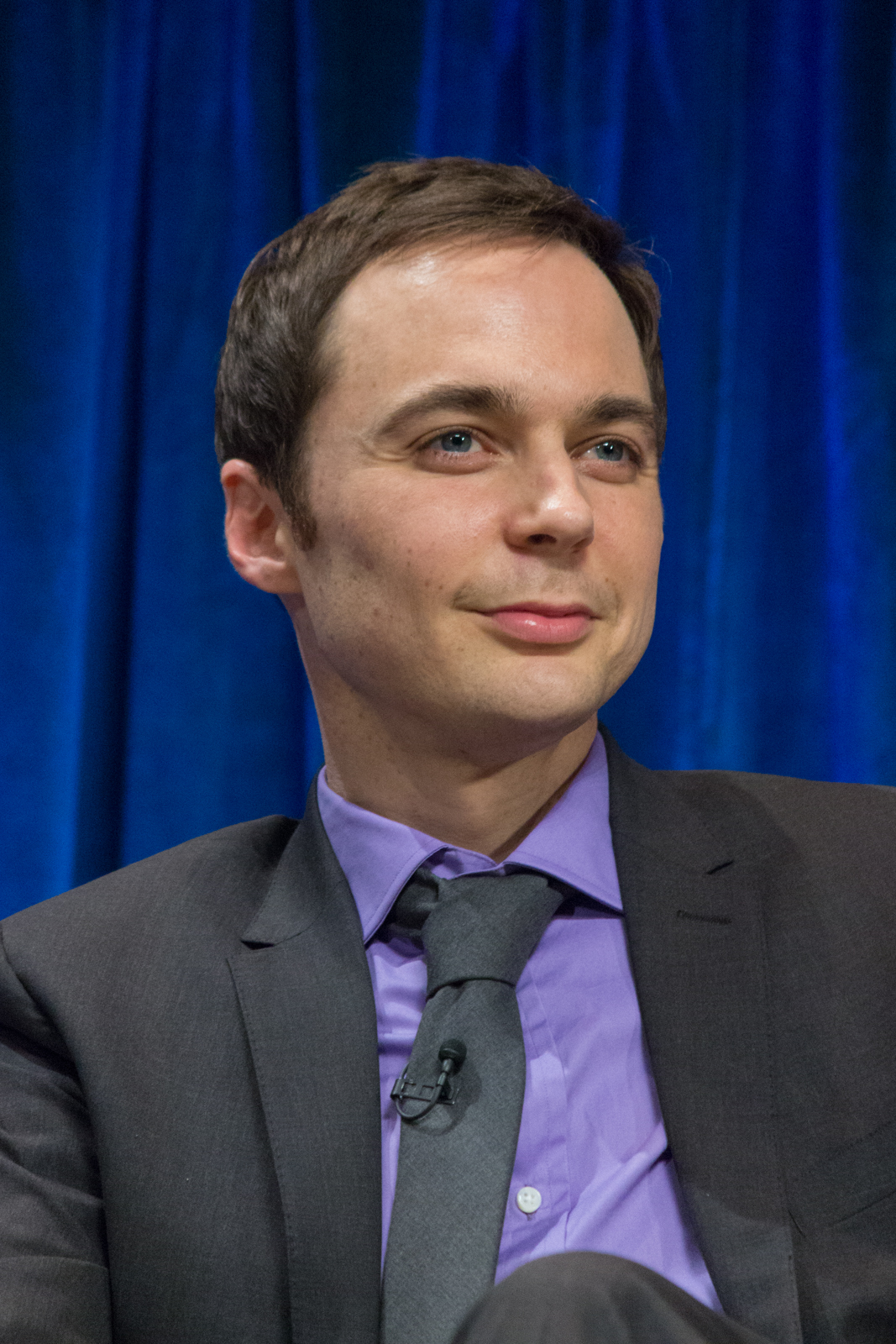
Parsons at the 2013 PaleyFest

Television critic Andrew Dansby compares Parsons's physical comedy to that of Buster Keaton and other silent film stars. Lorre praises Parsons' instincts, saying that "You can't teach that." Lorre describes Parsons' "great sense of control over every part of his body, the way he walks, holds his hands, cocks his head, the facial tics as 'inspired'." Reviewer Lewis Beale describes Parsons' performance as "so spot-on, it seems as if the character and the actor are the same person." Parsons admits that the work is "more effort than I ever thought a sitcom would take, and that's really the fun of it." In August 2009, Parsons won the Television Critics Association award for individual achievement in comedy, beating Alec Baldwin, Tina Fey, Steve Carell, and Neil Patrick Harris. Parsons was nominated for Primetime Emmy Awards in 2009, 2010, 2011, 2012, 2013 and 2014 for Outstanding Lead Actor in a Comedy Series, winning in 2010, 2011, 2013 and 2014. In September 2010, Parsons and co-stars Johnny Galecki and Kaley Cuoco signed new contracts, guaranteeing each of them $200,000 per episode for the fourth season of The Big Bang Theory, with substantial raises for each of the next three seasons. The three were also promised a percentage of the show's earnings. In January 2011, Parsons won the Golden Globe award for Best Actor in a Television Series – Comedy. From August 2013, Parsons, Cuoco and Galecki each earned $325,000 per episode. In August 2014, Parsons, Galecki and Cuoco once again signed new contracts, guaranteeing each of them $1 million per episode for the eighth, ninth, and tenth seasons of The Big Bang Theory, as well as quadrupling their percentage of the show's earnings to over 1% each.

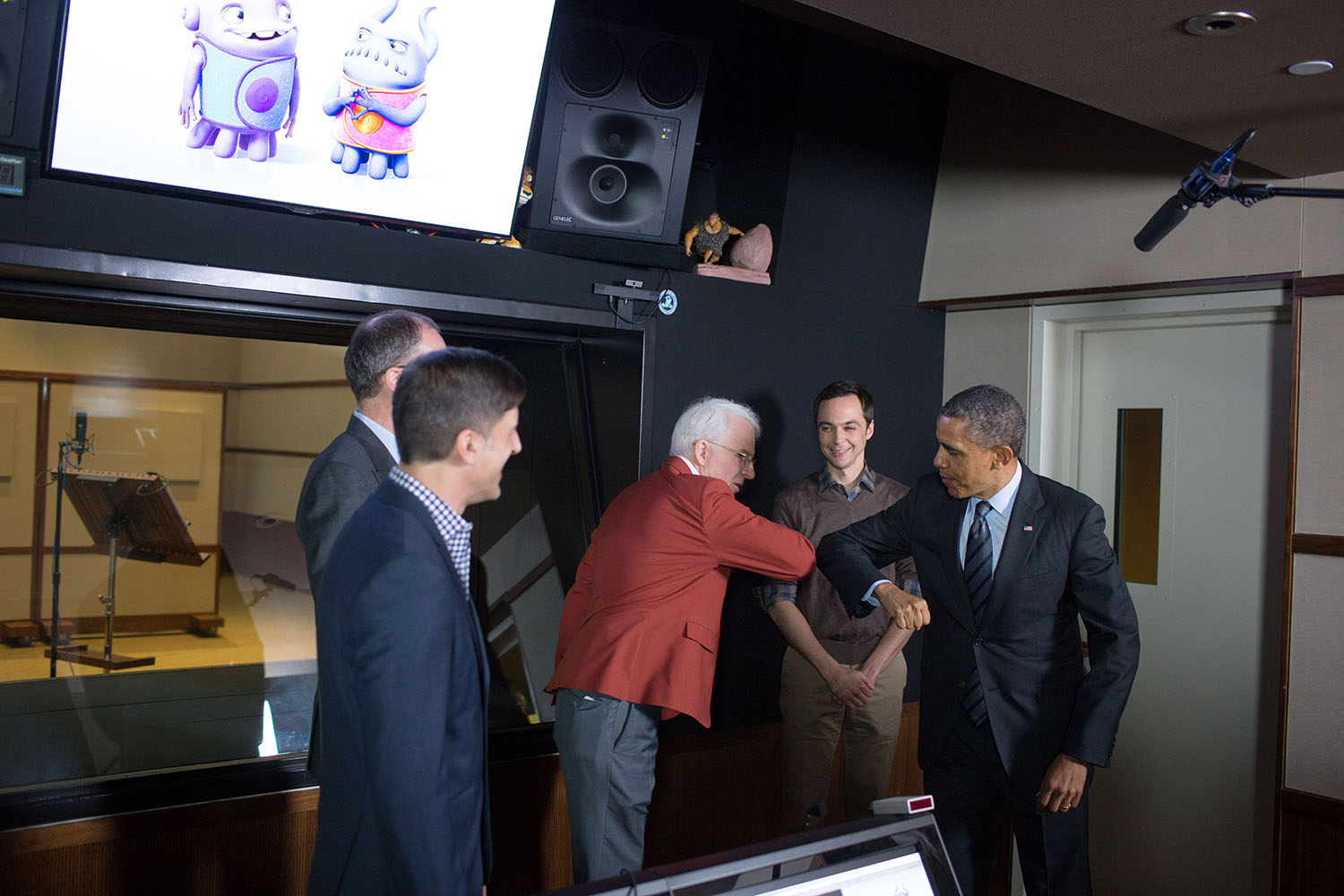
Steve Martin, Jim Parsons, and Barack Obama at DreamWorks Animation Studios in 2015

In 2011, Parsons appeared with Jack Black, Owen Wilson, Steve Martin, and Rashida Jones in the comedy film The Big Year. It was released in October. That same year, he appeared as the human alter ego of Walter, the newest Muppet introduced in The Muppets. On May 18, 2012, Parsons began appearing on Broadway as Elwood P. Dowd in a revival of Harvey. He reprised the role in The Normal Heart (2014), and he received his seventh Emmy nomination, this time in the category of Outstanding Supporting Actor in a Miniseries or Movie. Parsons received a star on the Hollywood Walk of Fame on March 11, 2015. He voiced Oh, one of the lead roles in the DreamWorks Animation comedy film Home (2015), alongside Rihanna.

Parsons and Todd Spiewak founded That's Wonderful Productions in 2015 with the intention of raising distinct voices and producing work with an underlying sense of purpose and social consciousness. Their work includes Special, Equal, Call Me Kat and A Kid Like Jake. Parsons and Spiewak are also executive producers of Young Sheldon. On January 29, 2015, it was announced that Parsons would star as God in the Broadway production of An Act of God, a new play by David Javerbaum and directed by Joe Mantello. The play began previews at Studio 54 on May 5, 2015 and closed August 2, 2015, to positive reviews. In 2016, Jim Parsons played a supporting role as STG (special task group) head engineer Paul Stafford in the biographical drama film Hidden Figures. The film was directed by Theodore Melfi, who had previously worked with Parsons in commercials for Intel.

In 2017, Parsons started hosting his own SiriusXM talk show, Jim Parsons Is Too Stupid for Politics. The show ran for six weeks. In August 2018, Parsons announced his refusal of a contract worth $50 million for seasons 13 and 14 of The Big Bang Theory. The producers simultaneously announced that, after 279 episodes, the most of any multi-camera series in TV history, the show would come to an "epic, creative close" in May 2019. Parsons was expected to remain in his role as narrator of the prequel series, Young Sheldon. In 2018, Parsons was one of the actors who voiced the audiobook A Day in the Life of Marlon Bundo. Parsons starred as party host Michael in the 50th anniversary Broadway production of The Boys in the Band, which won the 2019 Tony Award for Best Revival of a Play, reprising his performance (with the whole Broadway anniversary cast) in the 2020 film adaptation.

=== 2020–present: Return to theatre ===
In 2020, he portrayed Henry Willson in the Ryan Murphy limited series Hollywood on Netflix. He also served as an executive producer. For his performance he was nominated for the Primetime Emmy Award for Outstanding Supporting Actor in a Limited or Anthology Series or Movie. In 2022, he portrayed Michael Ausiello in the romantic comedy Spoiler Alert. He acted in the revival of Terrence McNally's A Man of No Importance at the Classic Stage Company. He starred in Paula Vogel's new play Mother Play (2024) acting alongside Jessica Lange and Celia Keenan-Bolger. He starred as the Stage Manager in the revival of the Thorton Wilder play Our Town at the Ethel Barrymore Theatre.

== Personal life ==
Parsons resides in the Gramercy Park neighborhood of New York City while also maintaining a residence in Los Angeles.

On May 23, 2012, an article in The New York Times noted that Parsons is gay and had been in a relationship for the last ten years. His husband is art director Todd Spiewak. In October 2013, Parsons called their relationship "an act of love, coffee in the morning, going to work, washing the clothes, taking the dogs out—a regular life, boring love". Parsons and Spiewak wed in New York in May 2017.

Parsons supported Democratic candidate Hillary Clinton in the run-up for the 2016 United States presidential election.

== Acting credits ==
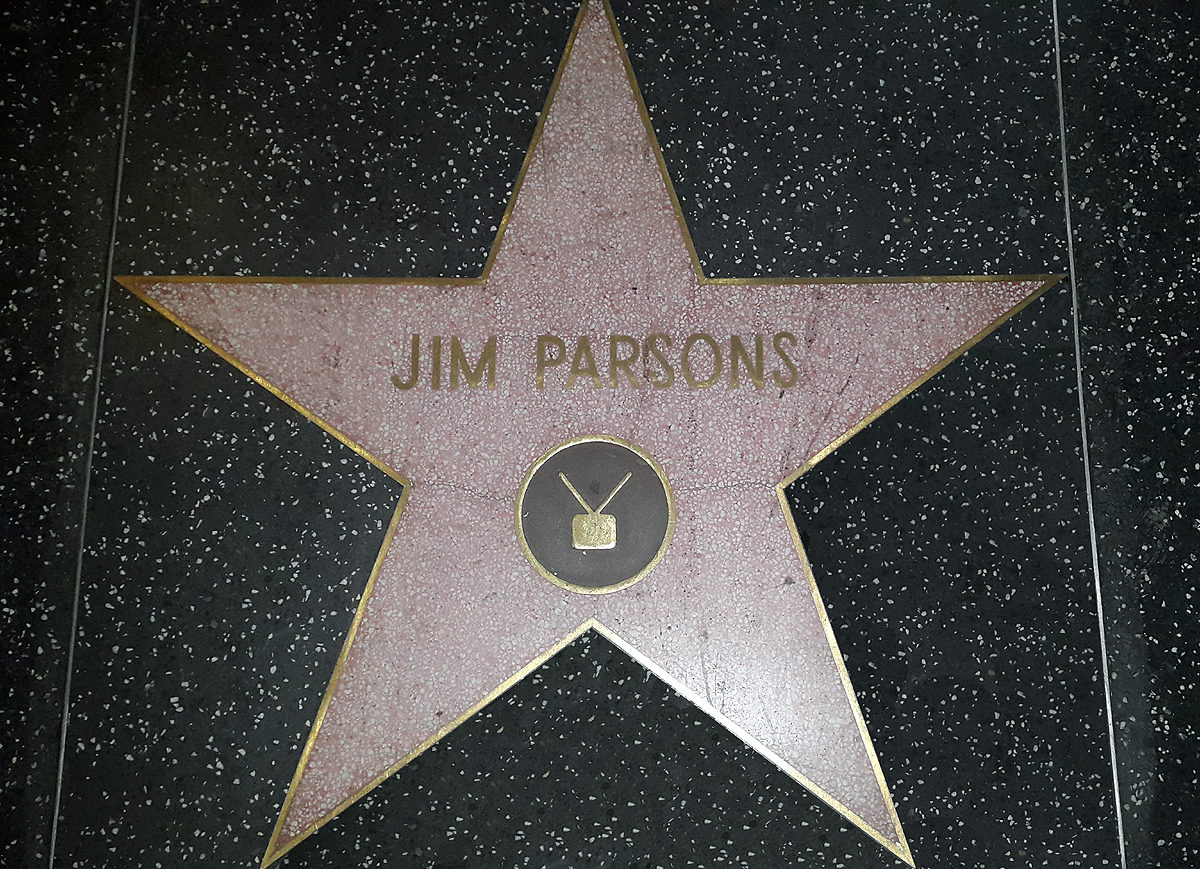
Parsons' Hollywood Walk of Fame star

=== Film ===
Year	Title	Role	Notes
2003	Happy End	Casting Assistant	
2004	Garden State	Tim	
2005	Heights	Oliver	
2005	The Great New Wonderful	Justin	
2005	The King's Inn	Sidney	Short film
2006	10 Items or Less	Receptionist	
2006	School for Scoundrels	Classmate	
2007	On the Road with Judas	Jimmy Pea	
2007	Gardener of Eden	Spim	
2011	The Big Year	Crane	
2011	The Muppets	Human Walter	Cameo
2012	Sunset Stories	Prince	
2014	Wish I Was Here	Paul	
2015	Home	Oh	Voice
2015	Visions	Dr. Mathison	
2016	Hidden Figures	Paul Stafford	
2018	A Kid Like Jake	Greg Wheeler	Also producer
2019	Extremely Wicked, Shockingly Evil and Vile	Larry Simpson	
2020	The Boys in the Band	Michael	
2022	Spoiler Alert	Michael Ausiello	Also producer
2025	Animal Farm	Carl, The Sheep	Voice
2026	The Leader	Warren	

=== Television ===
Year	Title	Role	Notes
2002	Ed	Chet	Episode: "The Road"
2004–2005	Judging Amy	Rob Holbrook	7 episodes
2007–2019	The Big Bang Theory	Sheldon Cooper	Main role
2009, 2012	Family Guy	Sheldon Cooper / Gay-Jacker (voice)	2 episodes
2010	Glenn Martin, DDS	Draven (voice)	Episode: "Jackie's Get-Witch-Quick Scheme"
2011	The Super Hero Squad Show	Nightmare (voice)	Episode: "Blind Rage Knows No Color!"
2011	Pound Puppies	Milton Feltwaddle (voice)	2 episodes
2011	iCarly	Caleb	Episode: "iLost My Mind"
2011	Eureka	Carl the Jeep (voice)	Episode: "Do You See What I See"
2012	Kick Buttowski: Suburban Daredevil	Larry Wilder (voice)	Episode: "Jock Wilder's Nature Camp"
2013	Who Do You Think You Are?	Himself	Season 4; Episode 8
2014	Saturday Night Live	Host	Episode: "Jim Parsons/Beck"
2014	The Normal Heart	Tommy Boatwright	Television film
2014	Elf: Buddy's Musical Christmas	Buddy (voice)	Television special
2016	SuperMansion	Mr. Skibumpers (voice)	Episode: "SuperMansion: War on Christmas"
2017	Michael Jackson's Halloween	Hay Man (voice)	Television film
2017–2024	Young Sheldon	Sheldon Cooper (voice)	Narrator; also executive producer (live-action in "Memoir")
2017–2022	Pete the Cat	Stan (voice)	17 episodes
2019–2021	Special	—N/a	Executive producer
2020	The Simpsons	Himself (voice)	Episode: "Frinkcoin"
2020	Hollywood	Henry Willson	Main role; also executive producer
2021	Staged	Himself	Episode: "The Warthog and the Mongoose: Part Two"
2021–2023	Call Me Kat	—N/a	Executive producer

=== Theatre ===
Year	Title	Role	Venue	Ref.
1993	The Balcony	Torturer (Arthur)		
1994	Rosencrantz and Guildenstern Are Dead	Rosencrantz		
1995	La Ronde	Alfred		
1995	Endgame	Clov	Infernal Bridegroom Productions	
1995	Marat/Sade	Steve	Infernal Bridegroom Productions	
1996	Guys and Dolls	Rusty Charlie	Infernal Bridegroom Productions	
1996	Eddie Goes to Poetry City	Eddie	Zocalo Theatre	
1996	Jack and the Future Is in Eggs	Jack		
1996	Othello	Iago	Infernal Bridegroom Productions	
1996	Suicide in B-flat	Petrone	Infernal Bridegroom Productions	
1996	Woyzeck	Doctor / Horse's Head	Infernal Bridegroom Productions	
1997	The Cherry Orchard	Yasha	Infernal Bridegroom Productions	
1997	Chili Queen	Buddy	Stages Repertory Theatre	
1997	Camino Real	Baron	Infernal Bridegroom Productions	
1997	Last Rites	Tiger Clean	Infernal Bridegroom Productions	
1998	The Threepenny Opera	MacHeath	Infernal Bridegroom Productions	
1998	Below the Belt	Dobbitt		
1998	In the Jungle of the Cities	J. Finnay	Infernal Bridegroom Productions	
1998	Tamalalia 3: The Cocktail Party	Psychotic psychiatrist	Infernal Bridegroom Productions	
1998	King Ubu is King	Tom, Mister Nice Guy	Infernal Bridegroom Productions	
1998	The Pitchfork Disney	Presley Stray	Stages Repertory Theatre	
1999	Marie and Bruce	Herb / Fred / Waiter	Infernal Bridegroom Productions	
1999	Tamalalia 4: The Camp-Out	Ralf	Infernal Bridegroom Productions	
2001	Da	Young Charlie	Old Globe Theatre	
2002	What Happened Was	Jackie	The Paradise Theatre	
2001	The Castle	Jeremiah	Manhattan Ensemble Theatre	
2002	Tartuffe	Valère	La Jolla Playhouse	
2004	The Love for Three Oranges (Gozzi)	Prince Tartaglia	La Jolla Playhouse	
2011	The Normal Heart	Tommy Boatwright	John Golden Theatre	
2012	Harvey	Elwood Dowd	Studio 54	
2015	An Act of God	God	Studio 54	
2018	The Boys in the Band	Michael	Booth Theatre	
2022	A Man of No Importance	Alfie Byrne	Classic Stage Company	
2024	Mother Play	Carl	Helen Hayes Theatre	
2024–2025	Our Town	The Stage Manager	Ethel Barrymore Theatre	
2026	Titanique	Ruth DeWitt Bukater	St. James Theatre	

=== Video games ===
Year	Title	Role	Notes
2010	Marvel Super Hero Squad: The Infinity Gauntlet	Nightmare	Voice

== See also ==
- LGBT culture in New York City
- List of LGBT people from New York City
