= Roger Penske =

American racing driver and businessman (born 1937)

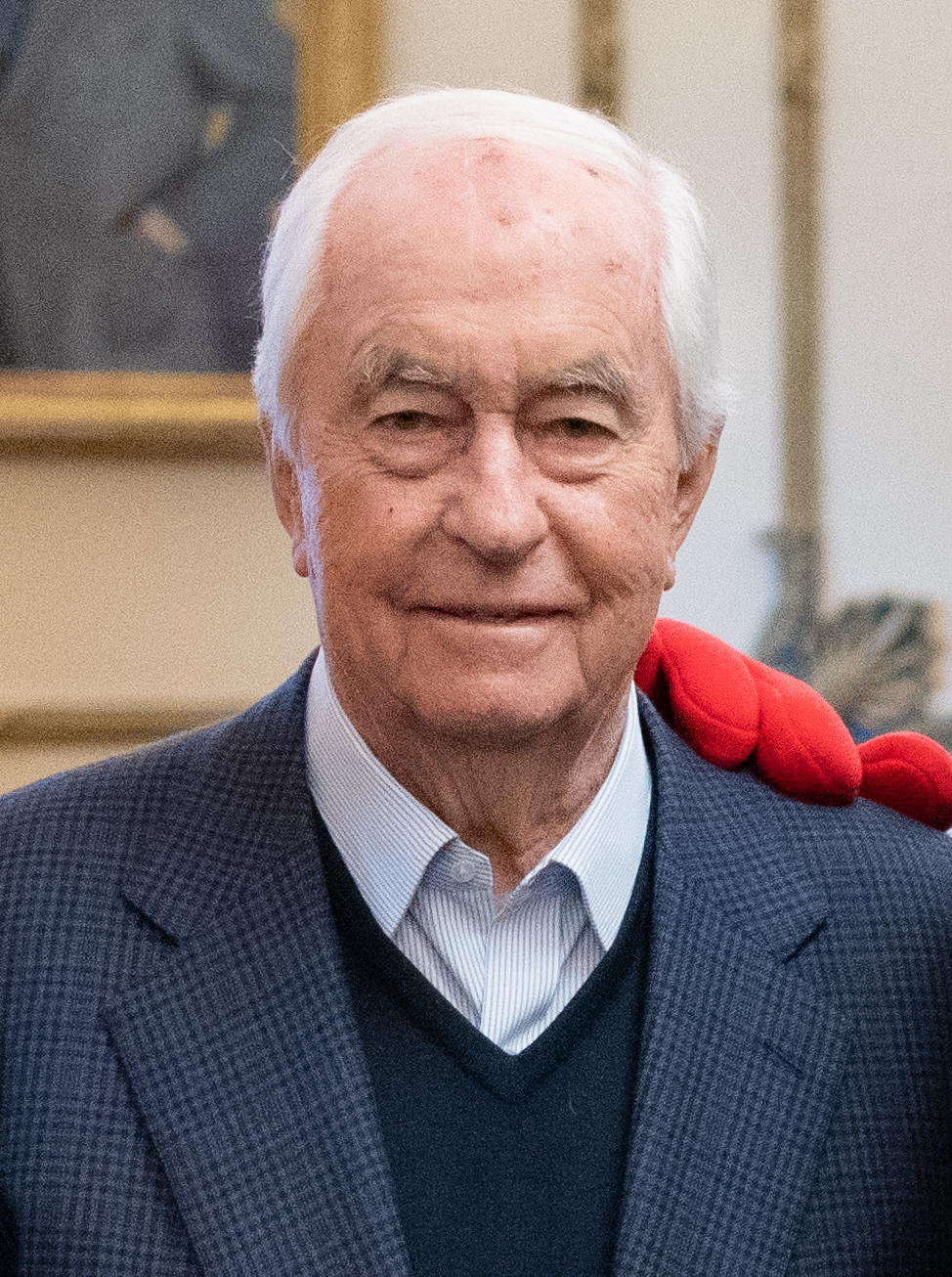
- Penske in 2023
- Born: Roger Searle Penske; February 20, 1937 (age 89); Shaker Heights, Ohio, U.S.
- Relatives: Gregory Penske (son); Jay Penske (son)

Formula One World Championship career
- Nationality: (United States) American
- Active years: 1961–1962
- Team(s): Non-works Cooper and Lotus
- Entries: 2
- Championships: 0
- Wins: 0
- Podiums: 0
- Career points: 0
- Pole positions: 0
- Fastest laps: 0
- First entry: 1961 United States Grand Prix
- Last entry: 1962 United States Grand Prix

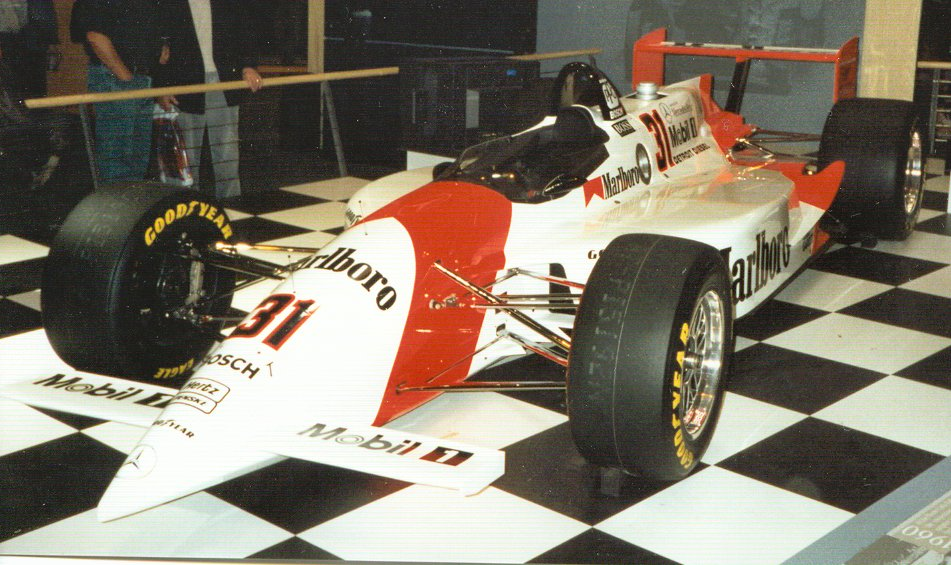
1994 Indy 500 winning Penske PC23 driven by Al Unser Jr.

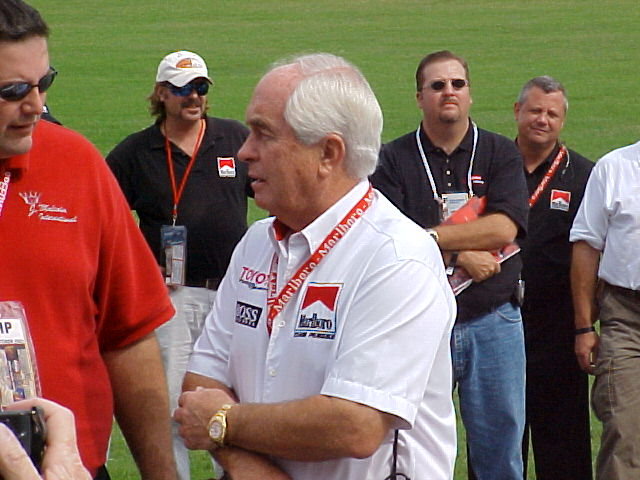
Penske in 2005

Roger Searle Penske (born February 20, 1937), often referred to by his nickname "the Captain", is an American auto racing team owner, businessman, and former professional racecar driver. He is the owner of Team Penske, the Indianapolis Motor Speedway, IndyCar, and other auto racing-related businesses. Penske is the founder, chairman, and namesake of the Penske Corporation, a holding company for his various businesses. Penske received the Presidential Medal of Freedom from President Donald Trump in 2019.

== Early life and education ==
Penske was born in Shaker Heights, Ohio, in 1937 into a devout Episcopalian family. He was heavily involved with his church as a boy, singing in the church choir and serving in the ministry as an acolyte. His father Jay was a successful corporate executive for a metal fabrication company who encouraged his son to become an entrepreneur. As a teenager he bought older cars, repaired them, and sold them at a profit from his family's home outside Cleveland, Ohio.

After graduating from Shaker Heights High School in 1955, Penske matriculated at Lehigh University, where he was a member of the Phi Gamma Delta fraternity, and he graduated in 1959.

== Racing career ==
Penske's first racing venture was in hillclimbing, and then he drove in road course racing at the Vineland Raceway in Vineland, New Jersey, as a member of the Philadelphia Region of the Sports Car Club of America (SCCA) in Porsches. Penske made his first professional racing start at the now-abandoned Marlboro Motor Raceway in Upper Marlboro, Maryland.

Sports Illustrated named Penske SCCA Driver of the Year in 1961. He competed in two Formula One Grands Prix and won a NASCAR Pacific Coast Late Model race at Riverside in 1963. He never ran the Indianapolis 500; however, he was offered a rookie test at Indianapolis with the Dean Van Lines team.

Penske continued racing until 1965, when he retired as a driver, to concentrate on his first Chevrolet dealership in Philadelphia, Pennsylvania.

== Business career ==
During college, Penske worked at Alcoa as an intern, and in 1959 joined them as a sales engineer after graduating, while also pursuing a career in racecar driving where he met people involved in Chevrolet. In 1963, he left Alcoa to become a manager of a Chevrolet dealership in Philadelphia, which he bought a year later with a loan from his father. He shifted his focus away from race-car driving to the dealership after the purchase.

In 1969, Penske founded Penske Truck Leasing in Reading, Pennsylvania by purchasing a truck rental and leasing business with three locations serving eastern Pennsylvania.

== Racing teams ==
Penske Racing debuted in 1966 at the 24 Hours of Daytona. He developed one of the most successful teams in the IndyCar Series and NASCAR racing. He is the most successful team owner at the Indianapolis 500 with 20 victories. He is known by his nickname of "The Captain". Penske also served as a race strategist for his IndyCar team, most recently for driver Will Power.

Penske won his first NASCAR Sprint Cup Championship with driver Brad Keselowski on November 18, 2012.

In late 2014, it was announced Penske would take a 51% stake in Australian V8 Supercars team Dick Johnson Racing, forming DJR Team Penske. The team entered one car in 2015, initially for Marcos Ambrose, before he stepped aside to make way for Scott Pye. The team expanded to a second car for New Zealander Fabian Coulthard in 2016, before Pye was replaced with another Kiwi Scott McLaughlin in 2017. Coulthard won the combined team's first championship race at the 2017 Tyrepower Tasmania SuperSprint. In 2019, the team won the biggest race of the year: the Bathurst 1000.

On September 16, 2018, driver Brad Keselowski won the South Point 400 at Las Vegas Motor Speedway, giving Penske his 500th race victory as an owner across all racing series. Later the same season, Joey Logano would clinch the championship at Homestead-Miami Speedway, winning Penske his second championship in the Cup series.

== Penske Corporation ==
Penske is chairman of Penske Corporation, based in Bloomfield Hills, Michigan. Some of the company's holdings include a significant stake in publicly traded Penske Automotive Group, an international company that operates automobile dealerships in the United States, Canada, and parts of Europe; Penske Truck Leasing, a truck sales, leasing, and fleet maintenance company; and Penske Motor Group which operates auto dealerships in California and Texas. On November 4, 2019, Penske acquired the Indianapolis Motor Speedway, a 2.5-mile course in Speedway, Indiana known for the Indianapolis 500, and IndyCar from the Hulman family for an undisclosed amount.

== Personal life ==
Penske was married to Lisa Stouffer, daughter of Gordon Stouffer (of the Stouffer Corporation), with whom he had two sons, Roger Jr. and Gregory. Gregory is vice chair of the board of Penske Automotive Group and CEO of Penske Motor Group, and Roger Jr. owns several automotive dealerships. Penske later married Kathryn Penske (née Hulbert), and the couple have children: Greg, Jay, Roger Jr., Mark, and Kathryn. Jay is the owner of Penske Media Corporation. Roger Penske received a kidney transplant from his son Greg in 2017.

As of May 2026, Penske's estimated net worth is $7.7 billion.

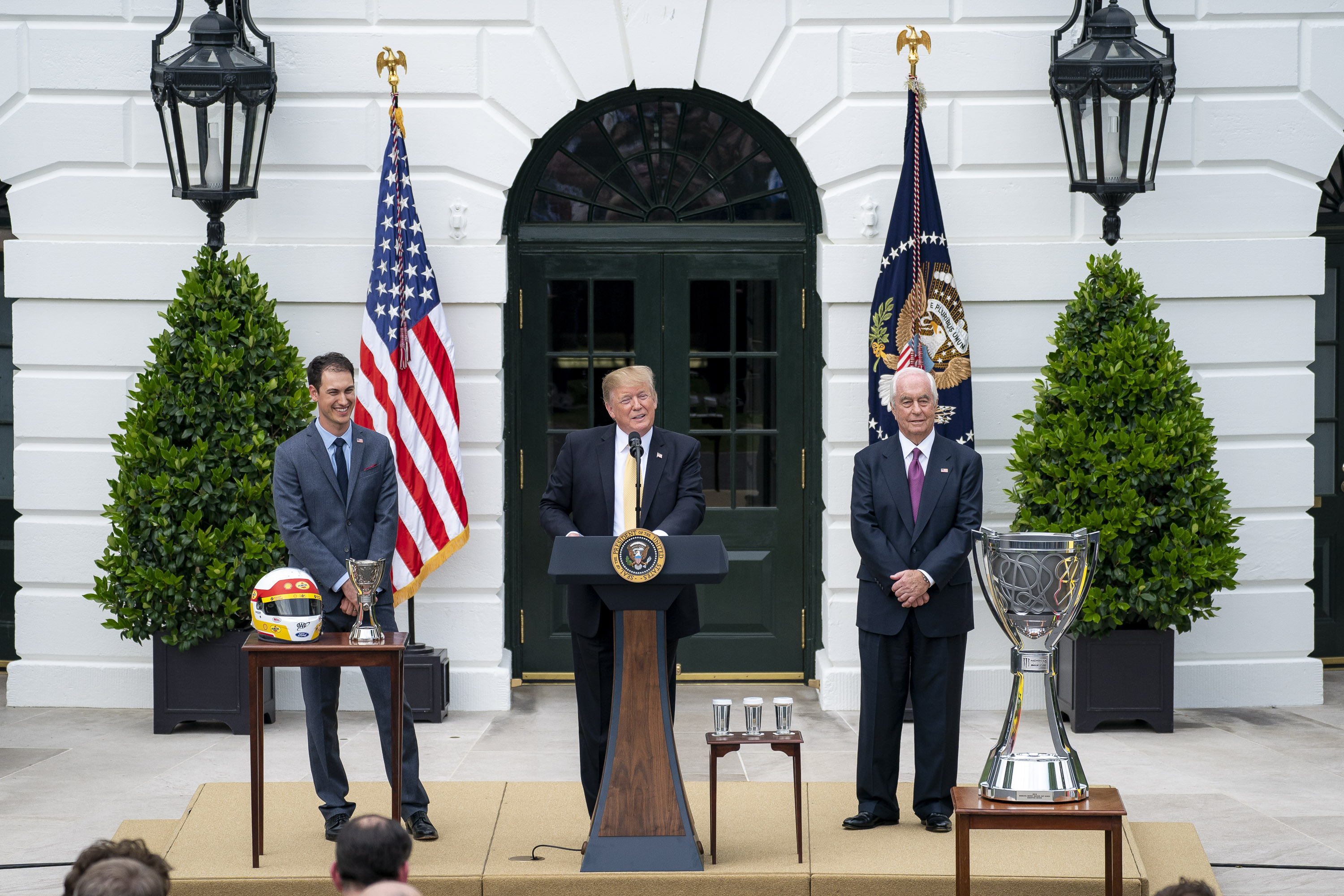
Penske (right) with President Donald Trump (center) and racing driver Joey Logano (left) on the White House south lawn in 2019

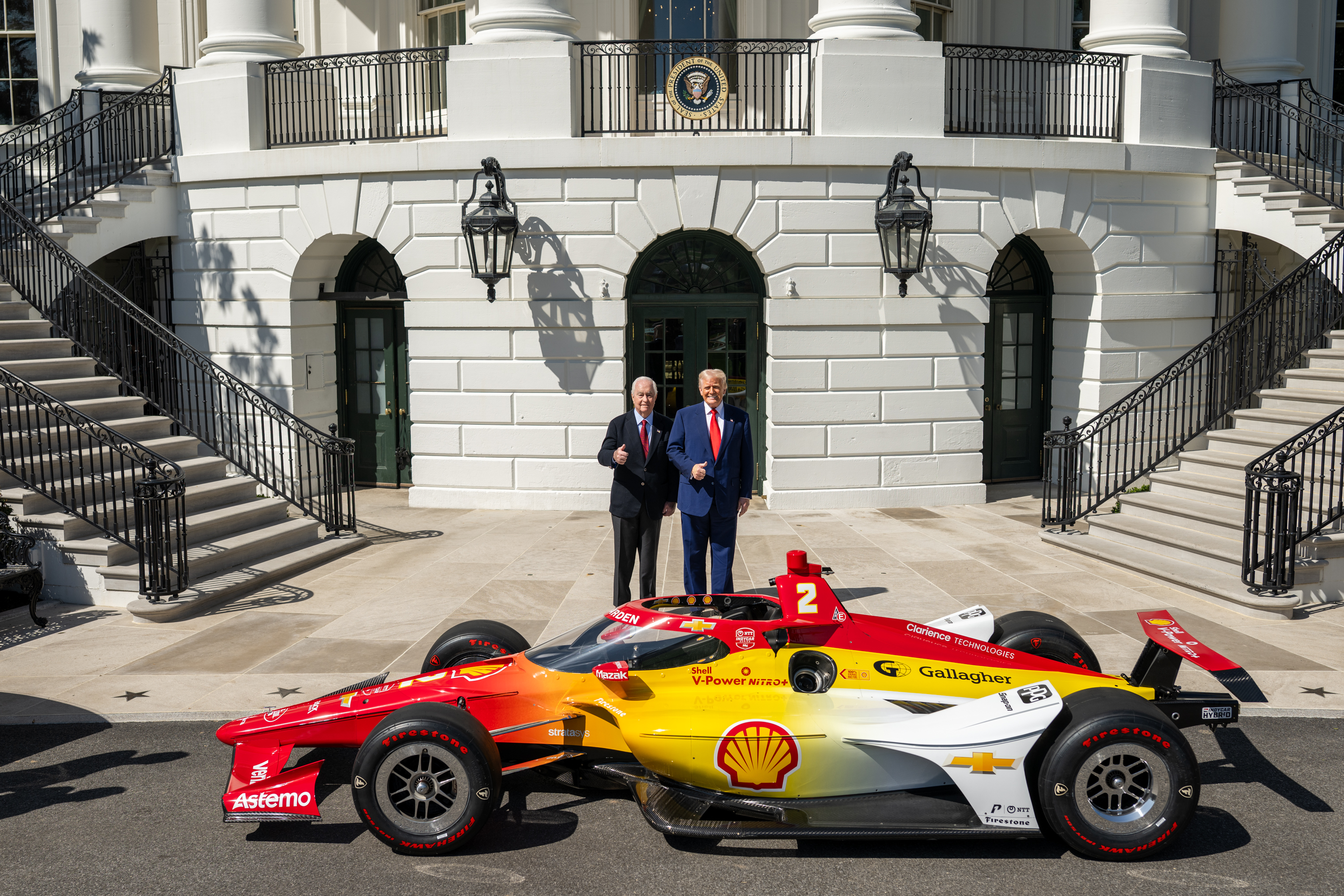
Penske (left) with President Donald Trump (right) at The White House in 2025

Penske Racing donated $500,000 to Restore Our Future, Mitt Romney's Super PAC. He was discussed as a potential candidate for Mayor of Detroit but declined to run. Penske endorsed Donald Trump in the 2020 United States presidential election after receiving the Presidential Medal of Freedom in 2019. He contributed $45,000 to Donald Trump's 2020 presidential campaign. On April 9, 2025, Penske and his NASCAR, IndyCar, and IMSA SportsCar Championship drivers and cars visited the White House. Trump was invited to the 2025 Indianapolis 500 by Penske, but did not attend.

== Awards and honors ==
Auto racing

- Six-time IndyCar Series Champion as owner (2006, 2014, 2016, 2017, 2019, 2022)
- Five-time NASCAR Cup Series Champion as owner (2012, 2018, 2022, 2023, 2024)
- 1990 Golden Plate Award of the American Academy of Achievement
- 2018 Simeone Foundation Spirit of Competition Award recipient

Halls of Fame

- 1995 Motorsports Hall of Fame of America inductee
- 1998 International Motorsports Hall of Fame inductee
- 2002 Indianapolis Motor Speedway Hall of Fame inductee
- 2015 Automotive Hall of Fame inductee
- 2019 NASCAR Hall of Fame inductee
- 2025 Trans-Am Series Hall of Fame inductee.

National

- 2019 Presidential Medal of Freedom recipient

== Motorsports career results ==
=== Complete Formula One World Championship results ===
Year	Entrant	Chassis	Engine	1	2	3	4	5	6	7	8	9	WDC	Points
1961	John M Wyatt III	Cooper T53	Climax Straight-4	MON	NED	BEL	FRA	GBR	GER	ITA	USA; 8		NC	0
1962	Dupont Team Zerex	Lotus 24	Climax V8	NED	MON	BEL	FRA	GBR	GER	ITA	USA; 9	RSA	NC	0

=== 24 Hours of Le Mans results ===
Year	Team	Co-Drivers	Car	Class	Laps	Pos.	Class Pos.
1963	(United States) North American Racing Team	(Mexico) Pedro Rodríguez	Ferrari 330 TRI/LM	P +3.0	113	DNF	DNF

=== 12 Hours of Sebring results ===
Year	Team	Co-Drivers	Car	Class	Laps	Pos.	Class Pos.
1961	(United States) Brumos Porsche Company	(United States) Bob Holbert	Porsche 718 RS 61	S1.6	199	5th	1st
1962	(United States) Briggs Cunningham	(New Zealand) Bruce McLaren	Cooper Monaco T57 Maserati	S3.0	190	5th	2nd
1963	(United States) Mecom Racing Team	(United States) Augie Pabst	Ferrari 250 GTO	GT3.0	203	4th	1st
1964	(United States) McKean Chevrolet, Inc.	(United States) Jim Hall	Chevrolet Corvette Grand Sport	P+3.0	177	18th	4th

=== Other events ===
- Puerto Rico Grand Prix

== Bibliography ==
- Roger Penske - Sports Car Club of America

== Bibliography ==
- Kirby, Gordon (October 15, 2022). Racing with Roger Penske: A History of a Motorsport Dynasty. CarTech Inc. ISBN 978-1613256848.
