= Spoils =

Spoils or The Spoils may refer to:

- Looting or "the spoils of war", rewards gained through military victory
- Spoils system of distributing government jobs in US politics
- The Spoils (card game), a collectible card game
- "The Spoils" (Rome), an episode of the television series Rome
- The Spoils (U.S.S.A. album)
- The Spoils (Zola Jesus album)
- The Spoils (band), a band from Australia
- Al-Anfal, "The Spoils", eighth chapter of the Qur'an
- The Spoils of Babylon TV series and its sequel The Spoils Before Dying, collectively
- "The Spoils" (song), a single from British band Massive Attack
- The SpOils, a 2024 Malayalam language feature film
