= Spoiler =

Spoiler or Spoilers may refer to:

== Arts, entertainment and media ==
- Spoiler (media), something that reveals significant plot elements
- The Spoiler, DC Comics superheroine Stephanie Brown

=== Film and television ===
- Spoiler (film), 1998 American science fiction
- The Spoiler (TV series), 1972 Australian drama
- The Spoilers (1914 film), American Western with William Farnum, based on 1906 Rex Beach novel
  - The Spoilers (1923 film), remake with Noah Beery Sr. and Anna Q. Nilsson
  - The Spoilers (1930 film), remake with Gary Cooper and Betty Compson
  - The Spoilers (1942 film), remake with Marlene Dietrich, Randolph Scott and John Wayne
  - The Spoilers (1955 film), remake with Anne Baxter, Jeff Chandler and Rory Calhoun
- Spoilers with Kevin Smith, 2012 film review TV show

=== Literature ===
- The Spoiler (novel), 2011, by Annalena McAfee
- The Spoilers (Bagley novel), 1969, by Desmond Bagley
- The Spoilers (Beach novel), 1906, by Rex Beach
- The Spoilers, a novel by Edwin Pugh, 1906
- "The Spoilers", a short story by Michael Gilbert in Game Without Rules, 1967

=== Music ===
- The Spoiler (album), by Stanley Turrentine, 1966
- Spoiler (album), by Aitana, 2019

== People ==
- The Spoiler (wrestler) (Donald Delbert Jardine, 1940–2006), Canadian masked champion
- Drew McDonald (wrestler) (1955–2015), ring name The Spoiler

== Science, technology and transportation ==
- Spoiler (aeronautics), a device which intentionally reduces the lift component of an airfoil
- Spoiler (car), a device to modify air flow over a vehicle
- Spoiler (security vulnerability), on modern computer central processing units
- Beam spoiler, material placed in the path of the photon beam in radiation therapy

== Other uses ==
- Spoiler effect, where the entry of a losing (irrelevant) candidate affects the results of an election
- Spoiler effect (sports), where teams eliminated from playoffs can affect other teams in the league as they play
- The Spoilers, the trio of Ph.Ds who serve as the villains in the bonus round of the 1970s CBS game show Double Dare

== See also ==
- Spoiler Alert (disambiguation)
- Mighty Spoiler (Theophilus Philip, 1926–1960), Trinidadian calypsonian
