= Penske Media Corporation =

American digital media, publishing, and information services company

- Trade name: PMC
- Formerly: Velocity Services (2003–2007)
- Type: Private
- Industry: Digital media; Video; Publishing; Information services
- Predecessor: Mail.com Media Corporation (2007–2012)
- Founded: 2003; 23 years ago
- Founder: Jay Penske
- Headquarters: 11175 Santa Monica Boulevard, Los Angeles, California, U.S.
- Key people: Jay Penske (CEO)
- Brands: Deadline Hollywood; Fairchild Fashion Media; IndieWire; Variety; Gold Derby; Robb Report; Rolling Stone; ARTnews
- Owner: Jay Penske (60%)
- Divisions: Penske Business Media; PMC Studios; PMC International; PMRe
- Subsidiaries: Penske Media Eldridge (JV); PMX Global
- Website: pmc.com

Penske Media Corporation (PMC /ˈpɛnski/) is an American mass media, publishing, and information services company based in Los Angeles and New York City. It publishes more than 20 digital and print brands, including Variety, Rolling Stone, Women's Wear Daily, Deadline Hollywood, Billboard, The Hollywood Reporter, Robb Report, Artforum, ARTNews, and others. PMC's Chairman and CEO since founding is Jay Penske.

In addition to media publications, Penske Media Corporation owns the Life Is Beautiful Music & Art Festival and is a 50 percent stakeholder in South by Southwest. It is also the owner of Dick Clark Productions which includes the award shows Golden Globe Awards, American Music Awards, Streamy Awards, Academy of Country Music Awards, and the Billboard Music Awards.

== History ==
=== 2003–2011: Founding and early years of Penske Media ===
Penske Media Corporation was founded by Jay Penske in 2003. It began as an affinity marketing and internet services company called Velocity Services, Inc. The company acquired the Mail.com domain and was renamed to the Mail.com Media Corporation (MMC). By 2008, the company owned digital entertainment properties like OnCars.com, Hollywood Life, Movieline, and MailTimes in addition to operating the Mail.com portal and email service. In mid-2008, the company received a $35 million growth equity round of financing from Quadrangle Capital Partners, a leading private equity fund.

In early 2009, the company announced the purchase of Deadline Hollywood Daily (now known as Deadline.com). The website had previously been operated by publisher LA Weekly.

In February 2010, MMC finalized and announced a joint venture with Zee TV for the creation of the new India.com web portal and seven other portals, to compete with other major web portals.

In April 2010, MMC purchased Jonathan Geller's Boy Genius Report (BGR), a tech and gadget blog, for an undisclosed amount of money. MMC moved the blog to a new URL (BGR.com) and also introduced a broader spectrum of technology coverage. Geller remained the website's Editor in Chief after the sale.

In September 2010, the Mail.com email and portal service was sold to United Internet. MMC remained the primary content provider for Mail.com, but the email service itself was operated by United Internet and its GMX email platform.

=== 2011–2016: Variety, Fairchild, and other acquisitions ===
PMC logo used from 2012 to 2014

In 2012, MMC re-branded itself as Penske Media Corporation. In October 2012, PMC purchased Variety Inc., including the weekly Variety magazine, Daily Variety, Variety.com, and all associated assets, for a reported $25 million from Reed Elsevier. PMC received financial backing from hedge fund Third Point LLC. Some of PMC's early changes to Variety's business plan included eliminating the website's paywall, ceasing the printing of Daily Variety, and investing more in the digital platform, Variety.com. The paywall was taken down on March 1, 2013, and, after 80 years of publication, the last print edition of Daily Variety was issued on March 19, 2013. A redesigned Variety magazine launched on March 26, 2013.

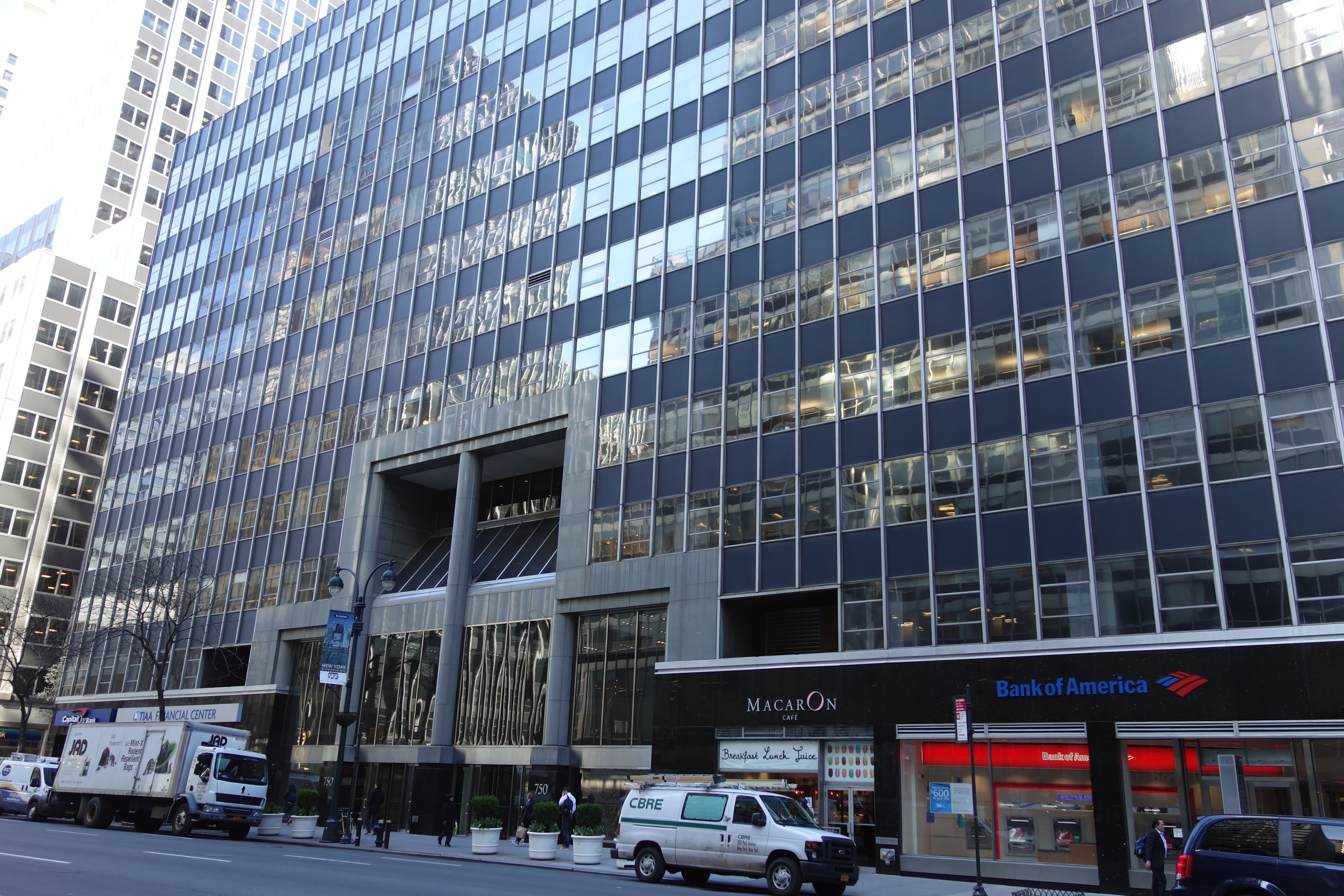
The company's former New York offices were located at 750 Third Avenue.

In late 2014, PMC purchased Fairchild Fashion Media from Condé Nast for just under $100 million. Under the terms of the deal, PMC obtained ownership of Fairchild's print and digital media properties including Women's Wear Daily (WWD), Footwear News, Beauty Inc., and others. Condé Nast had purchased the assets from Disney Corporation in 2003 for over $650 million. Two of Fairchild's properties, Style.com and W, remained under Condé Nast's ownership.

In June 2015, Penske Media Corporation formed a partnership with Shutterstock to be the exclusive licensor of imagery from PMC's fashion and entertainment archives. The following month, PMC purchased Gold Derby, a data platform and website that utilizes user and professional predictions to predict the outcome and winners of global awards shows and events. In January 2016, PMC acquired independent film and television publication IndieWire from SnagFilms, Inc. for an undisclosed amount of money.

=== 2017–present: Robb Report, Rolling Stone, MRC venture, and Vox Media ===
In January 2017, Penske Media Corporation entered into a joint venture for the Robb Report with Rockbridge, the private equity firm of Dan Gilbert. In December 2017, Penske Media acquired a majority stake of Rolling Stone magazine from Wenner Media. In 2018, it expanded further into music with an investment in BuzzAngle Music. Additional acquisitions from 2017 to 2018 include SHE Media, Sourcing Journal, and Art Media Holdings, which includes Art in America and ARTnews.

On September 23, 2020, it was announced that PMC would assume operations of the MRC Media & Info publications, including Variety's main competitor, The Hollywood Reporter, and Billboard magazine, under a joint venture with MRC known as PMRC. In turn, MRC will form a second joint venture that will develop content tied to PMRC publications. In 2021, it purchased a 50 percent stake in South by Southwest, and sold Hollywood Life, website about entertainment, celebrity, and fashion news targets women ages 18 to 35 and attracts an audience of 35 million visitors per month, founded and run by former Us Weekly, Marie Claire, and Glamour editor, Bonnie Fuller.

In 2022, the company acquired a majority stake in Las Vegas' Life Is Beautiful Music & Art Festival, which was placed under the Rolling Stone division. On May 19, 2022, PMC, which occupied approximately 45 percent of the leased space in the 24-story 475 Fifth Avenue building, together with RFR Holding, contributing 50 percent of its equity to the partnership, completed the purchase of the skyscraper with a $290 million loan. The same year, it acquired the contemporary art magazine Artforum; Penske did not purchase the magazine's sister publication Bookforum, which subsequently ceased publication before being revived under The Nation magazine. Penske also launched the LA3C, a music festival in Los Angeles, California.

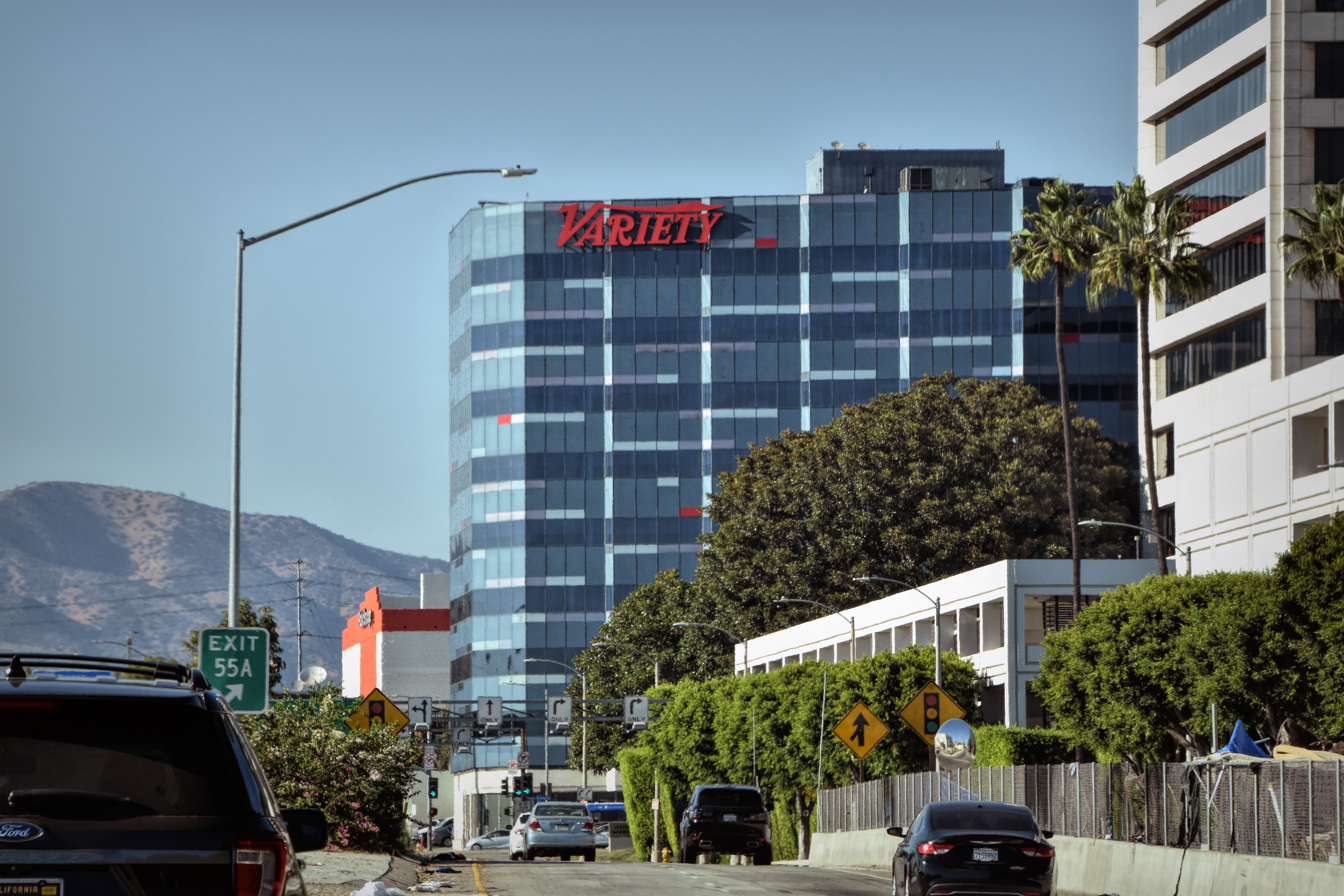
The company's former headquarters at 11175 Santa Monica Boulevard was relocated to 11355 West Olympic Boulevard in 2023 to consolidate all PMC offices in one location.

In January 2023, a stake in Dick Clark Productions was sold to PMC via the joint venture Penske Media Eldridge. In February 2023, PMC became the largest shareholder in Vox Media, acquiring a 20% stake in the company with Jay Penske joining Vox Media's board.

In August 2025, PMC sold Boy Genius Report and TVLine to Static Media.

On June 18, 2026, what remained of Vox Media that had not been previously announced to be purchased by James Murdoch's Lupa Systems the previous month was fully bought by Penske Media, with the assets of Vox Media being combined with PMC's other media assets (such as Billboard, Variety, Rolling Stone, The Hollywood Reporter, Deadline and IndieWire) as a new subdivision named PMX. The other part of the company that had been purchased by Lupa Systems retained the Vox Media brand name.

== Controversy ==
Penske Media’s ownership of the Golden Globe Awards as well as its ownership of Hollywood publications including The Hollywood Reporter, Variety and Deadline has been a source of controversy. In July 2026, Penske was sued by the Hollywood Foreign Press Association (HFPA) which presented the Golden Globes prior to its acquisition by the Penske owned Dick Clark Productions. The federal suit alleges violations of federal and state antitrust laws. It is alleged that this acquisition was done by Penske to influence awards season races. The HFPA is seeking $150 million in damages and the unwinding of the agreement that transferred ownership of the Golden Globes to Penske Media.

== See also ==
- BuzzFeed
- Future US
- Hearst Magazines
- People Inc.
- Vice Media
