= Affinity marketing =

Method of extending market reach

Affinity marketing is a concept that consists of a partnership between a company (supplier) and an organization that gathers persons sharing the same interests to bring a greater consumer base to their service, product or opinion. This partnership is known as an affinity group.

The first academic approach of affinity marketing was provided by Macchiette and Roy in 1992. They described this notion as a combination of affinity and the marketing ideas. They defined the word affinity as "an individual level of cohesiveness, social bonding, identification and conformity to the norms and standards of a particular reference group" whereas marketing is described to be the "expectation of benefit for the individual satisfying consumer wants and needs".

Affinity marketing differs from co-branding. The benefits of co-branding partnerships come from the consequences of the association of multiple companies, whereas the benefits of affinity marketing derive from the mental satisfaction to have profited the affinity group.

An affinity group is a group which has a solid connection with a considerable number of consumers and which has the possibility to target them in a much easier way than what can be accomplished by way of ordinary marketing process. People may recognize themselves in affinity groups such as charitable organizations, football teams, enterprises, companies, and organizations. Thus, affinity group members may be fans, customers, subscribers, or staff members.

== Features ==
Affinity marketing concepts are characterized by three specific features:

- "The third party endorsement" happens when the company has built a strong relationship with the affinity group's leadership who is going to advertise the service or product to its members. The affinity group's leader generally send a personal written communication to the affinity group membership to strengthen credibility and the members' confidence in the product. Other marketing such as newsletters and electronic social media marketing are also used.
- "The shared incentives concept" describes the main motivations facing the affinity group and the organizations involved. Promoting prescription discount cards and medical negotiation services to an affinity group that was created to promote lower healthcare costs is an example.
- "The enhancement package" consists in designing the product in a way that it meets exactly the consumer's needs. Knowing the consumers potential to purchase a specific product is key to the success of the campaign. Similar to the above example, a package of medical service savings coupons and discounts as well as prescription discount cards and coupons sold to the members that are known to struggle with the high cost of insurance and healthcare would be considered and enhancement package. This may differ from the above, shared incentive concept, in that this medical savings package is valuable to members of affinity groups regardless of the stated purpose of the affinity group.

The example of prescription discount cards used by football teams' fans help to figure out affinity marketing's characteristics. The first feature as it is stated above is the third party endorsement. In this case, the fact of endorsement by using the club's logo is just considered an endorsement and is passively marketed through newsletters and possibly sponsorship signage and mentions as a means to advertise.

It is only when the affinity group is actively involved in marketing the product that this becomes an example of the second affinity marketing features anan shared incentive type of marketing. The team's manager or captain sends a personalized letter to his fans spurring them to use the prescription discount card. Possibly electronic direct marketing and telephonic marketing can be used to increase utilization of the card. The affinity group receives a share of the revenue generated by the use of the card and are therefore incentivised and motivated to continue the marketing and advertisement campaigns, creating further utilization of the card. Then, the second feature i the shared incentives concept which can be in this example the utilization of the credit card and the enhancement of the brand fidelity for the bank. The football team for its part, benefits from profit share, more games and products sales. Finally, the enhancement package can consist of loyalty rewards distributed after using the card a certain number of times. as well as the former two concepts

== Benefits ==
There are plenty of benefits for all bodies when employing an affinity marketing strategy.

=== Suppliers ===
The supplier sells at lower price his products because he reduces his expenses in marketing research. He also profits from the customer's increase in fidelity. By joining the affinity partner, the supplier strengthens his reputation. Furthermore, he knows better his target audience simplified by the fact that he has access to the affinity group's information and has the opportunity to carry out some research programs with its members.

=== Affinity groups ===
Each affinity group is seeking for different advantages. But usually, affinity groups increase their income by asking a commission for example. Affinity groups have also a better connection and affinity with their members. Finally, they protect and enhance their reputation without taking any risks as well as avoiding the costs involved in merchandising directly the product or service.

=== Customers ===
Suppliers and affinity groups are not the only parties profiting from this marketing scheme. End-consumers benefit from it, but their benefits depend on the nature of the affinity partner (charitable organization) and the nature of the product or service sold. Again, generally customers are directly satisfied to profit from extra discounts for example, and they become more confident in their choices because of the partnership between their affinity group and the company. Furthermore, they benefit from products and services that have been designed and manufactured especially for them.

== Failure and limitations ==
When employing an affinity marketing program it is not always assured that the scheme is going to succeed. It is due to the fact that some organizations totally refuse to endorse the brand of a company and consider such a partnership as a violation of their dignity. A total affinity marketing scheme failure is also explained by a bad timing in the sense that some companies choose to target the customers at the wrong time. For example, summer and Christmas are not the right moments to focus on pupils and academic staff because of the holiday. Another reason for this lack of success is that the target audience's income is not sufficient for the products offered. Moreover, many affinity marketing efforts fail to tailor the promoted goods and services to that affinity group's specific needs.

== In e-commerce ==
In the context of e-commerce, affinity marketing consists in sharing referrals by promoting icons and links connected to other websites that meet the customers' needs. The aim of employing affinity marketing schemes on the internet is to increase sales, enhance website visibility, encourage traffic. Search engines are involved in affinity marketing by selling links when users type keywords. As e-commerce websites tend to increasingly segment the market, some applications analyze the customers' online conduct in order to personalize them and offer them tailored products.

== Market segmentation ==
Having an essential function in affinity marketing, the nature of the individual's common bond is indispensable for understanding the concept. In other words, it is important to know in what way or manner the relationship was built and to know to which affinity group the customer belongs. When segmenting the market, the affinity marketers also need to take into account the purpose of the Affinity Group's existence, any other affiliate programs, the number of people who are composing the group, the nature of the people in the group, members' solvency and the receptivity to the goods and services offered. Further, in analyzing affinity marketing one needs to acknowledge the power and nature of affinity. An affinity marketing strategy is focused on one of the four different aspects of affinity. First, affinity is related to the support of a deserving cause. Second, affinity is based on relationships creating a sense of recognition in an organization that doesn't necessary have to exist (for instance a country, a family or an animal). Third, affinity comes from a sense of desiring to be part of a dissimilar social group (aspirational). Last, affinity is correlated to the wish for personally acquiring discounts, or privileges from goods and services sold by a specific organization (self-interest). This group may include State Bar Associations which make membership mandatory, Professional and Trade Unions other Professional Associations such as Realtor Associations where they are not captive but membership is compelled by controlling access to tools and support essential to their work. A few affinity groups use more than one of these facets to achieve their marketing scheme. For instance, very enthusiastic baseball fans support their team for a deserving cause, identify themselves in their team, and personally benefit from discounts and advantages.
