= List of Smith College people =

The following is a list of individuals associated with Smith College through attending as a student, or serving as a member of the faculty or staff.

== Notable alumnae ==
The Alumnae Association of Smith College considers all former students to be members, whether they graduated or not, and does not generally differentiate between graduates and non-graduates when identifying Smith alumnae.

=== Academia ===
- Frances Dorothy Acomb, 1932, academic and historian
- Susan Low Bloch, 1966, professor at Georgetown University Law Center, member of the American Law Institute
- Laura Bornholdt, 1940, historian and dean at Sarah Lawrence College, University of Pennsylvania, and Wellesley College
- Mary Whiton Calkins, 1884, philosopher and psychologist
- LaWanda Cox, 1934, M.A., noted historian of slavery and reconstruction at Hunter College
- Otelia Cromwell, 1900, first African-American woman to receive a Yale degree, educator
- Diana L. Eck, 1967, professor of comparative religion and Indian studies and master of Lowell House at Harvard University
- Mira Hinsdale Hall, 1883, founder of Miss Hall's School
- Jean Harris, 1945, notable for work with female inmates after serving time herself
- Margaret Hutchins, 1906, reference librarian and professor at Columbia University
- Elisabeth Irwin, 1903, founder of Little Red School House
- Sally Katzen, 1964, law scholar, civil servant
- Catharine MacKinnon, 1968, feminist, scholar, lawyer, teacher and activist
- Neda Maghbouleh, 2004, American-born Canadian sociologist, scholar, writer, author, and educator; the Canada Research Chair in Migration, Race, and Identity and associate professor of sociology at the University of Toronto Mississauga
- Amy Richlin, 1970, professor in Department of Classics at UCLA
- Sylvia Scribner, 1943, psychologist and educational researcher
- Bonnie G. Smith, 1962, historian at Rutgers University
- Denise Spellberg, 1980, scholar of Islamic history
- Terrie Christine Stevens, 1970, mathematician and founder of Project NExT
- Helen R. Stobbe, 1930, geologist and professor
- Laura D'Andrea Tyson, 1969, professor at Haas School of Business of UC Berkeley, former and first female Director of National Economic Council, former Chair of Council of Economic Advisors, first female dean of London Business School

=== College presidents ===
- Ada Comstock, 1897, third and first full-time president of Radcliffe College
- Rhoda Dorsey, 1946, longest-serving and first female president of Goucher College
- Elizabeth Hoffman, 1968, 20th president of the University of Colorado System
- Victoria Murden McClure, 1985, president of Spalding University
- Mary Patterson McPherson, 1957, sixth president of Bryn Mawr College, former vice president of the Andrew W. Mellon Foundation, executive officer of American Philosophical Society
- Nancy A. Roseman, 1980, 28th president of Dickinson College

=== Activism ===
- Shaharzad Akbar, 2009, Afghan human rights activist
- Blanche Ames Ames, 1899, president of the Class of 1899, portraitist, women's rights activist, and inventor
- Heloise Brainerd, 1904, peace activist
- Jennifer Chrisler, 1992, executive director of Family Equality Council
- Alice T. Days, documentary filmmaker
- Betty Friedan, 1942, author of The Feminine Mystique, co-founder and first president of National Organization for Women, renowned feminist
- Martha Smith Kimball, 1892, suffragist
- Yolanda King, 1976, activist and daughter of civil rights leader Martin Luther King Jr.
- Susan Lindauer, 1985, journalist and antiwar activist
- Kathleen Ridder, 1945, philanthropist, educator, writer, equality for women activist
- Jean Gurney Fine Spahr, 1883, social reformer associated with the Rivington Street Settlement
- Gloria Steinem, 1956, founder of Ms. magazine, founding editor of New York Magazine, noted feminist and political activist
- Helen Rand Thayer, 1884, co-founder and president of the College Settlements Association
- Mary van Kleeck, 1904, social feminist
- Gertrude Weil, 1901, activist of women's suffrage, labor reform and civil rights

=== Arts ===
- Desiree Akhavan, 2007, filmmaker and actress, Appropriate Behavior and The Miseducation of Cameron Post
- Garrett Bradley, 2007, filmmaker
- Tia Blake, 1989, singer-songwriter and writer
- Holly Trostle Brigham, 1988, feminist painter
- Gina Knee Brook, artist
- Cheryl Crawford, 1925, theatre producer and director
- Miriam Davenport, 1937, painter and sculptor who played a central role in helping European Jews escape the Holocaust
- Eleanor de Laittre, artist
- Maya Deren, 1939, U.S. avant-garde filmmaker and film theorist of the 1940s and 1950s
- Alison Frantz, 1924, archeological photographer and academic
- Merrill Garbus, 2001, founder, lead singer and instrumentalist for Tune-Yards
- Thelma Golden, 1985, board of Obama Foundation and chief curator of the Studio Museum in Harlem
- Shelley Hack, 1969, actress and model
- Sarah P. Harkness, 1937, architect
- Cynthia Harris, 1955, actress
- Susan Hiller, 1961, conceptual artist
- Rose Jang, 2001, pop opera singer, PR ambassador for Korean Tourism Office and UNESCO of Korea
- Mimi Kennedy, 1970, actress
- Diana Kleiner, 1969, art historian
- Carolyn Kuan, 1999, conductor, pianist, music director for Hartford Symphony Orchestra
- May Lillie, 1886, Wild West show performer and equestrian
- MJ Long, joint architect of the British Library
- Kathleen Marshall, 1985, three-time Tony Award-winning choreographer
- Dorothy Canning Miller, 1925, first professionally trained curator at the Museum of Modern Art
- Deborah Nehmad, 1974, attorney and artist
- Cornelia Oberlander, 1944, landscape architect
- Toks Olagundoye, 1997, actress, ABC TV sitcom The Neighbors
- Judith Raskin, 1949, Metropolitan Opera Soprano
- Romita Ray, 1992, art historian
- Pauline Gibling Schindler, 1915, Los Angeles arts figure
- Sandy Skoglund, 1968, artist
- Mary Otis Stevens, 1949, architect
- Patricia Wettig, 2001, actress and playwright, Brothers & Sisters
- Inez Harrington Whitfield, 1889, Arkansas-based botanical illustrator
- Stoner Winslett, 1980, artistic director, Richmond Ballet
- Alice Morgan Wright, 1904, sculptor, suffragist, advocate of animal rights

=== Authors ===
- Natalie Babbitt, 1954, Newbery Medal Honor-winning author of Knee-Knock Rise and Tuck Everlasting
- Joanna Barnes, 1956, actress and author
- Lillian Barrett, 1906, novelist and playwright
- Mildred Grosberg Bellin, 1928, cookbook author
- Mary Hastings Bradley, 1905, author
- Anna Hempstead Branch, 1897, poet
- Dorothy Hamilton Brush, 1917, author; birth control and women's rights advocate
- Ernestine Gilbreth Carey, 1929, author of Cheaper by the Dozen
- Ann Downer, 1982, writer
- Margaret Edson, 1983, Pulitzer Prize-winning playwright of Wit
- Edith Granger, 1891, author of Index of Poetry
- Laurie Ann Guerrero, 2008, writer and Texas poet laureate
- Svava Jakobsdóttir, 1952, Icelandic author, politician and women's rights activist
- Piper Kerman, 1992, author of Orange is the New Black
- Megan Dowd Lambert, 1996, children's book author
- Tosca Lee, 1992, best-selling author of Demon: A Memoir and Havah: The Story of Eve
- Madeleine L'Engle, 1941, Newbery Medal Honor-winning author of A Wrinkle in Time
- Anne Morrow Lindbergh, 1928, author of Gift from the Sea, pioneering aviator, spouse of Charles Lindbergh
- Pearl London, 1937, poet and teacher
- Sarah MacLean, 2000, bestselling author of young adult and romance novels
- Annie Russell Marble, 1886, 1895, author and essayist
- Ann Matthews Martin, 1977, Newbery Medal Honor-winning author of The Baby-Sitters Club
- Aubrey Menard, author and activist
- Olive Beaupré Miller (née Olive Kennon Beaupré), 1904, author, publisher and editor of children's literature
- Margaret Mitchell, 1922, Pulitzer Prize-winning author of Gone with the Wind (1937); left Smith shortly after her mother's death
- Erin Morgenstern, 2000, author of The Night Circus
- Ruth Ozeki, 1980, Japanese-American novelist and filmmaker
- Sylvia Plath, 1955, poet, novelist, and author of The Bell Jar and Ariel
- Halina Poświatowska, 1961, Polish poet and writer; one of the most important figures in modern Polish literature
- Olive Higgins Prouty, 1904, author of Now, Voyager and Stella Dallas
- Anna Chapin Ray, 1885, prolific author of juvenile and adult literature
- Cynthia Propper Seton, 1948, novelist, nominated for the National Book Award
- Janna Malamud Smith, 1979, non-fiction writer
- Martha Southgate, 1982, award-winning author
- J. Courtney Sullivan, 2003, novelist and former writer for The New York Times
- Dorothy Hayden Truscott, international champion bridge player and author
- Yoshiko Uchida, 1944, Japanese-American writer
- Cynthia Irving Voigt, 1963, Newbury Medal-winning author
- J.R. Ward, 1991, bestselling author of romance novels
- Diane Wolkstein, children's author and folklorist
- Hanya Yanagihara, 1995, author of A Little Life
- Jane Yolen, 1963, author and editor of almost 300 books

=== Business ===
- Lydia Jett, 2001, venture capitalist and former executive at SoftBank Vision Fund
- Shelly Lazarus, 1968, former CEO and chairman of Ogilvy & Mather
- Enid Mark, 1954, founder of the ELM Press
- Christine McCarthy, 1977, CFO of The Walt Disney Company
- Marilyn Carlson Nelson, 1961, former chairman and CEO of the Carlson Companies, former chair of the National Women's Business Council
- Phebe Novakovic, 1979, chairman and CEO of General Dynamics
- Durreen Shahnaz, 1989, founder of Impact Investment Exchange (IIX), the world's first social stock exchange

=== Diplomats and government officials ===
- Barbara Pierce Bush, 1947, 43rd First Lady of the United States (did not graduate, left college in 1945 to marry George H. W. Bush)
- Leecia Eve, 1986, deputy secretary for Economic Development in the Executive Chamber of New York governor, senior policy adviser to U.S. Sen. Hillary Rodham Clinton during her 2008 primary campaign for president
- Judith Fergin, 1973, former United States Ambassador to East Timor
- Louka Katseli, 1972, Greek Minister of Economy, Competitiveness and Shipping
- Maria Lopez, 1975, Cuban-American former judge and former television jurist
- Anne Clark Martindell, 2002 former United States Ambassador to New Zealand
- Helen Milliken, 1945, longest-serving First Lady of Michigan
- Emily W. Murphy, 1995, administrator of the General Services Administration
- Stephanie Neely, 1985, treasurer of City of Chicago
- Farah Pandith, 1990, special representative to Muslim Communities for U.S. Department of State
- Thelma Parkinson, 1920, politician, candidate for 1930 special election for the United States Senate, member of the New Jersey State Board of Tax Appeals, member (and later president) of the New Jersey Civil Service Commission, 1954–1970
- Nancy Reagan, 1943, 42nd First Lady of the United States
- Sherry Rehman, 1985, former Pakistan Ambassador to the United States
- Mary Scranton, 1940, former First Lady of Pennsylvania (1963–1967)
- Elizabeth Rudel Smith, 1933, treasurer of the United States
- Julianna Smoot, 1989, deputy campaign manager, Obama for America, former White House Social Secretary
- Adrianne Todman, 1991, acting U.S. secretary of Housing and Urban Development

=== Senators, congresspersons, and other politicians ===
- Lauren Arthur, 2010, Missouri Labor and Industrial Relations commissioner, former Missouri state senator and representative
- Barbara Adams, 1973, general counsel of Pennsylvania
- Tammy Baldwin, 1984, first openly gay U.S. senator, former U.S. representative of Wisconsin's 2nd District
- Becca Balint, 1990, member of the U.S. House of Representatives
- Deborah Bergamini, 1993, member of the Italian Parliament
- Leanna Brown, 1956, first Republican woman elected to the New Jersey Senate
- Emily Couric, 1969, late Virginia state senator and sister of television journalist Katie Couric
- Mattie Daughtry, 2009, Democratic assistant majority leader of the Maine Senate representing the 24th District
- Jane Lakes Harman, 1966, president of the Woodrow Wilson International Center for Scholars, U.S. representative of California's 36th District
- Maureen Ogden, 1950, seven-term member of the New Jersey General Assembly
- Mildred Towne Powell, 1908, president of the Seattle City Council
- Hazel Thrall Sullivan, member of the Connecticut House of Representatives
- Niki Tsongas, 1968, U.S. representative of Massachusetts's 5th District

=== Journalism and media ===
- Desiree Akhavan, 2007, Sundance Grand Jury Prize-winning filmmaker
- Marylin Bender, 1944, first female business editor of The New York Times
- Julia Child, 1934, Primetime Emmy Award and Peabody Award-winning host of The French Chef, renowned chef, and author of Mastering the Art of French Cooking
- Patience Cleveland, 1952, film and television actress
- Stephanie Cutter, 1990, co-host of CNN's Crossfire, chief spokesperson for the Obama-Biden Transition Project, senior advisor for Obama's presidential campaign
- Margaret Petherbridge Farrar, 1919, journalist and first crossword puzzle editor for the New York Times
- Shirley Fleming, music critic and editor
- Anne Froelick, blacklisted screenwriter
- Meg Greenfield, 1952, Pulitzer Prize-winning journalist, editorial writer for the Washington Post and Newsweek
- Sara Haines, 2000, co-host of The View, ABC News correspondent
- Sarah Hampson, 1979, Canadian journalist and columnist for The Globe and Mail
- Doan Hoang, 1994, award-winning Vietnamese-American film producer, screenwriter, and director
- Ruth Sulzberger Holmberg, 1943, newspaper publisher
- Molly Ivins, 1966, populist newspaper columnist, political commentator, humorist and bestselling author
- Adrian Nicole LeBlanc, 1986, author of Random Family, freelance journalist
- Nina Munk, 1988, journalist, author, and contributing editor at Vanity Fair
- Sharmeen Obaid-Chinoy, 2002, Pakistan's first Oscar winner, Academy Award and Emmy-winning documentary filmmaker for Saving Face and journalist
- Kate O'Brian, 1980, president of Al Jazeera America
- Helaine Olen, journalist and author
- Alexandra Penney, 1960, artist, journalist, editor of Self magazine
- Danielle Pletka, 1984, conservative commentator and senior fellow at American Enterprise Institute
- Sally Quinn, 1963, author and journalist for The Washington Post
- Julia Scott, 2002, NPR and The New York Times
- Anne Mollegen Smith (née Anne Rush Mollegen), 1961, first female editor-in-chief of Redbook
- Juliet Taylor, 1967, Emmy Award and Academy Award-winning casting director
- Lynne M. Thomas, 1996, Hugo Award-winning science fiction editor and curator
- Cynthia Wade, 1989, Academy Award-winning documentary filmmaker for Freeheld
- Erin Cressida Wilson, 1985, screenwriter

=== Law ===
- Cynthia Bashant, 1982, judge of the United States District Court for the Southern District of California
- Christine Beshar, 1953, partner at Cravath, Swaine & Moore
- Joan B. Gottschall, 1969, judge of the United States District Court for the Northern District of Illinois
- Carolyn Dineen King, 1959, first female and former judge of the United States Court of Appeals for the Fifth Circuit
- Dorothy Miner, 1958, chief counsel of the New York City Landmarks Preservation Commission
- Jane Richards Roth, 1956, judge of the United States Court of Appeals for the Third Circuit
- Stephanie Kulp Seymour, 1962, judge of the United States Court of Appeals for the Tenth Circuit

=== Philanthropy ===
- Florence Hague Becker, 1909, 16th president general of the Daughters of the American Revolution
- Eunice Blake Bohanon, 1925, children's book editor
- Susan Topliff Davis, 1886, president, Georgia State YWCA; president, Georgia Synodical Auxilliary Presbyterian Church; president, Presbyterian Hospital Association of Georgia
- Edith Scott Magna, 1909, 15th president general of the Daughters of the American Revolution
- Sarina Prabasi, 1995, chief executive officer of WaterAid America
- Mary Josephine Rogers, 1905, founder of Maryknoll Sisters
- Wendy Schmidt, 1977, president of Schmidt Family Foundation

=== Pulitzer Prize winners ===
- Margaret Edson, 1983, 1999 Drama for Wit
- Meg Greenfield, 1952, 1978 Editorial Writing
- Margaret Mitchell, 1922, 1937 Novel for Gone with the Wind
- Amy Ellis Nutt, 1977, 2011 Feature Writing
- Sylvia Plath, 1955, 1982 Poetry for The Collected Poems (awarded posthumously)

=== Sciences ===
- Pauline Morrow Austin, 1939, physicist and meteorologist
- Sara Bache-Wiig, 1918, botanist and mycologist
- Harriet Boyd-Hawes, 1892, pioneering archaeologist, nurse and relief worker
- Dorcas Brigham, 1918, botanist and horticulturist
- Constance Elizabeth Brinckerhoff, 1963, microbiologist and professor at Geisel School of Medicine
- Barbara Illingworth Brown, 1946, biochemist and professor at Washington University School of Medicine
- Judy Clapp, 1951, computer scientist
- Diane G. Cook, 1965, Parkinson's disease patient advocate and researcher
- Jocelyn Crane, 1930, carcinologist
- Mary Foster, 1891, biochemist
- Susan Goldin-Meadow, 1971, developmental psychologist
- Betty Hay, 1948, cell and developmental biology, M.D. degree from Johns Hopkins School of Medicine, first woman to head a department (Anatomy & Cellular Biology) at Harvard Medical School
- Carolyn Kaelin, 1983, breast cancer surgeon
- Helena Chmura Kraemer, 1957, biostatistician
- Anna Lysyanskaya, 1997, cryptographer and professor of Computer Science at Brown University
- Ng'endo Mwangi (Florence), 1961, Kenya's first female physician
- Erin K. O'Shea, 1988, sixth president of Howard Hughes Medical Institute
- Martha Austin Phelps, 1892, chemist
- Margaret Robinson, biologist
- Caroline Thomas Rumbold (1877–1949), botanist
- Florence R. Sabin, 1893, first woman to hold full professorship at Johns Hopkins School of Medicine, be elected to National Academy of Sciences, and head a department at the Rockefeller Institute for Medical Research
- Jane Stafford, 1920, chemist
- Jane C. Wright, 1942, pioneering oncologist and surgeon
- Joan S. Valentine, 1967, biochemist

=== Other notables ===
- Gertrude Gretsch Astor, socialite and second wife of John Jacob Astor VI
- Frances Carpenter, 1912, daughter of photographer Frank Carpenter
- Eunice Carter, 1921, first female African-American assistant district attorney for the state of New York, pivotal in the prosecution of Mob Boss Charles "Lucky" Luciano
- Penny Chenery, 1943, sportswoman, bred and raced Secretariat, the 1973 winner of the Triple Crown
- Julie Nixon Eisenhower, 1970, second daughter of 37th U.S. President Richard Nixon
- Jean Harris, 1945, spent time in prison for killing her boyfriend of 14 years, Herman Tarnower, who was the author of The Complete Scarsdale Medical Diet
- Jeannie Cho Lee, 1990, first ethnic Asian Master of Wine
- Ann Axtell Morris, 1922, archaeologist, artist, and author who largely worked in the U.S. southwest and Mexico
- Tori Murden, 1985, first woman to make a solo crossing of the Atlantic Ocean by rowboat
- Tei Ninomiya, 1910, first Asian graduate of Smith College
- Alice G. Schirmer, 1875, nurse and cookbook writer
- Charlotte Samuels, 2020, swimmer, youngest person to complete the Triple Crown of Open Water Swimming
- Cathy Schoen, economist at the New York Academy of Medicine, served on U.S. President Jimmy Carter's health insurance task force
- Kory Stamper, 1996, lexicographer and associate editor for the Merriam-Webster dictionary
- Sarah Thomas, 1970, research librarian
- Polly Palfrey Woodrow, 1929, tennis player
- Shirley Zussman, 1934, sex therapist

=== Fictional alumnae ===
- Becca Berlin, from Jane Yolen’s novel Briar Rose
- Piper Chapman, from Netflix Original series Orange Is the New Black
- Emily Gilmore, from the television series Gilmore Girls and Gilmore Girls: A Year in the Life
- Ainsley Hayes, from the television series The West Wing
- Mary Minor Harristeen, from the Mrs Murphy Mystery series
- Joanna Kramer, from the 1979 film Kramer vs. Kramer
- Serena MacGregor, from Nora Roberts’ novel Playing the Odds
- Selina Meyer, from the HBO television series Veep
- Cristina Yang, from the television series Grey's Anatomy
- Charlotte York, from the television series Sex and the City and And Just Like That...
- Robin Buckley, from the television series Stranger Things
- Gertrude Yorkes, from the television series Runaways

== Presidents of the college ==
See Smith College#Presidents.

== Notable administrators, faculty and staff (past and present) ==
- Senda Berenson Abbott, pioneer of women's basketball
- Alice Ambrose, professor of philosophy
- Newton Arvin, literary critic
- Leonard Baskin, taught 1953-74, artist
- Ben Baumer, statistician and sabermetrician
- Mary Lathrop Benton, professor or Latin and French
- Amy Bernardy, journalist, taught Italian at Smith 1903–1910
- Nina Browne, librarian, archivist, and inventor of Browne Issue System
- Mary Ellen Chase, professor of English
- Henri Cole, poet
- Adelaide Crapsey, poet
- Anita Desai, author
- Kim Yi Dionne, political scientist
- Donna Robinson Divine
- Alfred Einstein, musicologist
- Stanley Elkins, professor of history
- Hallie Flanagan, director and playwright
- William Francis Ganong, botanist
- Jean Garrigue, poet
- Judith Gordon, pianist
- Domenico Grasso, founding director, Picker Engineering Program
- Heloise Hersey, professor of English
- Helen Lefkowitz Horowitz, historian
- Denis Johnston, professor of philosophy
- Klemens von Klemperer, professor of history
- Karen Klinger, rower and Smith crew head coach
- Kurt Koffka, psychologist
- William Lee Miller, journalist and historian
- G. E. Moore, professor of philosophy (1940–1941)
- Barry Moser, artist and illustrator
- Sylvia Plath, poet
- Elizabeth Stordeur Pryor, professor of history
- Eric Reeves, professor of English
- Loretta Ross, academic, feminist, and advocate for reproductive justice
- Massimo (Max) Salvadori, British-Italian anti-fascist, professor of History (1945–73)
- Laura Woolsey Lord Scales, dean of students (1923–1944)
- Roger Sessions, composer
- Kate Soper, composer
- David Staines, literary critic
- David Peck Todd, astronomer
- Thomas Tymoczko, philosopher
- Kurt Vonnegut, author
- Julia Warner Snow (1863–1927), biologist
- Allen Weinstein, archivist of the United States
- Eleanor Wilner, poet and editor
- Dorothy Maud Wrinch, mathematician
- Chien-Shiung Wu, physicist
- Andrew Zimbalist, economist
