= Par =

Par may refer to:

== Finance ==
- Par value, stated value or face value in finance and accounting
- Par yield or par rate, in finance

== Games ==
- Par (score), the number of strokes a proficient golfer should require to complete a hole, round or tournament.
- Par (golf scoring format), an alternative to Stableford and normal stroke play
- Par contract, in contract bridge

== Organizations ==
=== Businesses ===
- Pan Am Railways, an American holding company
- Par Pharmaceutical, now part of Endo International
- PaR Systems, an American automation company

=== Political parties ===
- Aragonese Party (Partido Aragonés, PAR), Spain
- Movement For! (Kustība Par!), Latvia
- Party for the Restructured Antilles (Partido Antiá Restrukturá, PAR), Curaçao
- Revolutionary Action Party ('Partido Acción Revolucionaria', PAR), Guatemala
- People's Alliance for Reform, Singapore

=== Other organizations ===
- Parkinson Association of the Rockies, a not-for-profit organization
- Pretoria Armoured Regiment, an armour regiment of the South African Army

== Places ==
- Par, Cornwall, England
  - Par railway station
- Par, Iran
- Par, Vologda Oblast, Russia
- Par, Tibet
- Philippine Area of Responsibility, a weather monitoring area in the northwest Pacific
- Paraguay, IOC country code
- Parkesburg station, Pennsylvania, U.S., station code PAR
- Parliament railway station, Melbourne
- PAR, IATA airport code for the metropolitan area of Paris, France
- Par River (disambiguation), the name of several rivers

== Science and technology ==
=== Biology and medicine ===
- Par (fly), a signal fly in the family Platystomatidae
- Photosynthetically active radiation, a range of solar radiation
- Post-anesthesia recovery, part of a hospital
- Predictive adaptive response in biology
- Protease-activated receptors PAR1, PAR2, PAR3, PAR4
- Pseudoautosomal regions on sex chromosomes

=== Computing ===
- par (command), a text formatting utility for Unix
- Page address register, containing physical addresses
- Perl Archive Toolkit, a deployment tool
- Personal Animation Recorder, video capture for Amiga computers
- Pixel aspect ratio, in digital imaging
- .par, .par2, .par3, filename extensions of Parchive

=== Other uses in science and technology ===
- PAR Special, a 1950s American experimental aircraft
- Parabolic aluminized reflector, PAR lamp or PAR, a type of electric lamp
- Participatory action research, a social sciences research approach
- Passive autocatalytic recombiner, device that removes hydrogen from a nuclear power plant during an accident
- Par meter, to measure peak-to-average ratio in an electrical circuit
- Precision approach radar, a radar aircraft guidance system

== See also ==
- Parsec (disambiguation)
- Paragraph
- Pull to par, in finance
