= Bohanon =

Bohanon is a surname. Notable people with the surname include:

- Brian Bohanon (born 1968), American baseball player
- Eunice Blake Bohanon (1904–1997), American children's book editor, philanthropist
- George Bohanon (1937–2024), American jazz trombonist and session musician
- Gerry Bohanon (born 1999), American football player
- Luther L. Bohanon (1902–2003), American judge
- Tommy Bohanon (born 1990), American football player
