= Columbia University Press =

University press based in New York City, affiliated with Columbia University

- Parent company: Columbia University
- Founded: 1893
- Country of origin: United States
- Headquarters location: New York City
- Distribution: Perseus Distribution (US); John Wiley & Sons (Europe, Africa, Asia)
- Publication types: Books
- Imprints: Wallflower Press
- Official website: cup.columbia.edu

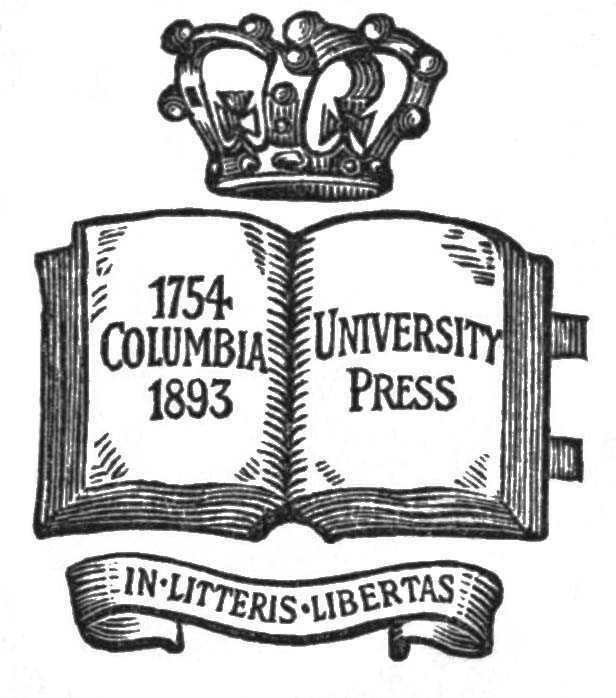
One of the earliest emblems of Columbia University Press

Columbia University Press is a university press based in New York City, and affiliated with Columbia University. Founded in 1893, it publishes titles in the humanities and sciences, including the fields of literary and cultural studies, history, social work, sociology, religion, film, and international studies.

== History ==
Columbia University Press was founded in May 1893. In 1933, the first four volumes of the History of the State of New York were published. In the early 1940s, the Press' revenues rose, partially thanks to the Encyclopedia and the government's purchase of 12,500 copies for use by the military.

Columbia University Press is notable for publishing reference works, such as The Columbia Encyclopedia (1935–present), The Columbia Granger's Index to Poetry (online as The Columbia World of Poetry Online) and The Columbia Gazetteer of the World (also online) and for publishing music.

The press is the first of all American university presses to publish music. In 1998, the Press founded an online-only site, Columbia International Affairs Online (CIAO), and Columbia Earthscape (in 2009). Their books have been positively reviewed by several notable outlets, including Cleveland Review of Books.

From 2014 to 2026, the press was led by Jennifer Crewe, who was the first female director of an Ivy League university press.

== Imprints ==
In 2011, Columbia University Press bought UK publisher Wallflower Press.

== See also ==
- List of English-language book publishing companies
- List of university presses
