= Diane G. Cook =

Diane G. Cook (born 1943) is a Parkinson's disease patient advocate, especially well known for the use of the science of self-efficacy to help newly diagnosed patients with Parkinson's. She accomplishes this through her roles as a senior patient advocate for the ProjectSpark Foundation (an advocacy organization for Parkinson's disease education, research and patient support). Cook also is a present and past clinical investigator on a number of clinical trials, and a speaker, writer and presenter at numerous local, state, national, and international forums focused on Parkinson's. She was diagnosed with Parkinson's disease in 2008.

== Education ==
Cook graduated from Smith College in Northampton, Massachusetts, in 1965 with a BA in art history. She has completed numerous post-graduate management courses, graduated from the Parkinson's Disease Foundation Clinical Research Learning Institute, and completed the National Institutes of Health Human Subjects Course.

== Professional activities ==
Cook is best known for developing a patient-centered approach known as the Parkinson's Disease Self-Efficacy Learning Forum (PD SELF), which enables patients to improve their quality of life and possibly affect the trajectory of their disease through the application to Parkinson's of the principles of self-efficacy, as identified by Dr. Albert Bandura of Stanford University. She has led four support groups focused on the development of this concept, one of which was a small clinical trial whose conclusions support the hypothesis of the SELF approach. She is leading a training program funded by the Parkinson's Disease Foundation to provide leader/facilitators to seed the SELF program in up to eight metropolitan areas across the United States. Cook has served as senior patient advocate since 2009 for the ProjectSpark Foundation, headquartered in Arlington, Virginia. She also served on the board of directors for the Colorado Neurological Institute, was state director for the Parkinson's Action Network in Colorado, and has served on the Strategic Planning Committee and the People with Parkinson's Advisory Council of the Parkinson's Disease Foundation. Cook is a member of the advisory committee for the University of Colorado Movement Disorders Center and a patient representative to the U.S. Food and Drug Administration. She served on the steering committee for the Clinical Trials Transformation Initiative, is a member of the New York Academy of Sciences and was on the faculty of the Clinical Research Learning Institute. Cook served on the faculty of the 3rd World Parkinson Congress(WPC 2013) in Montreal in September 2013 and was on the faculty of the Parkinson's Disease Foundation's Women and Parkinson's Disease Conference in 2015.

== Work experience ==
Cook was a management consultant, focusing on leadership development, team-building, assessment and training for Cook & Company of Denver, Colorado from 2006 to 2014. She previously managed international seminars for Deepak Chopra at the Chopra Center for Well-Being in La Jolla, California, and developed corporate training programs for ARC International. She was a consultant for John Wiley & Sons, and facilitated corporate leadership programs for Wilson Learning. Cook developed courses for International Learning Systems, did organization development consulting for the U.S. Information Agency and the U.S. Agency for International Development, and was president of the National Council for International Visitors from 1981 to 1984. She was executive director of the International Visitors Information Service in Washington, D.C., from 1972 to 1975, and she was program director for the New York City Commission to the United Nations and the Consular Corps from 1978 to 1981.

== Personal life ==
Cook is married to Gary M. Cook and has two children, Christian and Lauren, and three grandchildren. She lives in Denver, Colorado.

== Research ==
Cook has been a co-investigator on a study on the value of teaching self-efficacy to recently diagnosed Parkinson's patients and their care partners. She also has been a co-principal investigator with scientists at the University of Colorado Movement Disorders Center on opportunities and obstacles to patient engagement in the research process. Cook is a patient consultant on a Parkinson's and exercise study with the departments of physical therapy at the University of Colorado and the University of Pittsburgh. She has participated in 14 clinical trials since 2009.

== Awards ==
Cook received the HOPE Award from the Colorado Neurological Institute in 2011 for her educational activities on behalf of Parkinson's patients and for serving as an inspiration to others. She received the 9News 9Who Care Award in 2015 and a leadership grant from the Parkinson's Disease Foundation in 2014.

== Articles ==
Cook is author of: "Second World Parkinson's Congress: Final Thoughts," Parkinson's Disease Foundation Blog and Website, 2011; "The Gift of Participation," Parkinson Voice, Parkinson Association of the Rockies, 2011; "The Gift of Participation: A Patient's Perspective," NeuroMatters, Colorado Neurological Institute, 2012; "Biomedical Research a Good Investment," Letter to the Editor, Denver Post, March 6, 2012; "What's Happening in Parkinson's Legislation," Parkinson Voice, Parkinson Association of the Rockies, 2013; "Third World Parkinson's Congress: Final Thoughts," Parkinson's Disease Foundation Blog and Website, 2013; and "Setting the Record Straight on Parkinson's in Light of Robin Williams' Media Storm," Letter to the Editor, Denver Post, August 22, 2014.

== Presentations ==
Cook has presented: "Addressing the Needs of Newly Diagnose Parkinson's Disease Patients: Development of a Model Curriculum" at the Second World Parkinson's Congress in Glasgow, Scotland in 2010; "Effectiveness of a Self-Efficacy Learning Program for Newly Diagnosed Parkinson's Disease Patients and Their Care Partners: 3-Month Interim Report" at the International Movement Disorders Congress in Sydney, Australia in 2013; "6-Month Interim Report on the Effectiveness of a Self-Efficacy Learning Program for Newly Diagnosed Parkinson's Disease Patients and Their Care Partners" at the Third World Parkinson's Congress in Montreal, Canada in 2013; "Engaging People with Parkinson's in Determining and Defining Research Priorities" at the International Parkinson and Movement Disorders Congress in Portland, Oregon in 2015; "Adjustment to Life with Parkinson's Disease" at the Colorado Neurological Institute Parkinson's Education Forum in 2012; "The Importance of Participation in Clinical Research" at the Clinical Research Forum in 2012; "Meeting Parkinson's Quality of Life Challenges Through Self-Efficacy" at the Third World Parkinson's Congress in 2013; "Patient Engagement in Research" at the Third World Parkinson's Congress in 2013; "The Role of People with Parkinson's in the Research Process" at the Third World Parkinson's Congress in 2013; "The Power of Self-Efficacy" at the Parkinson's Association of the Rockies E-3 Conference in 2013; "The Many Faces of Parkinson's Disease" and "What's Next?" at the Partners in Parkinson's Conference sponsored by the Michael J. Fox Foundation in 2014; "Patient Perspective: Patient Engagement in the Clinical Research Process" at the Medical Leaders' Meeting of Pfizer in 2014; "Living with the Hidden Parkinson's" at the International Conference on Non-Motor Symptoms: Unraveling the "Invisible" Face of Parkinson's Disease of the New York Academy of Sciences in 2015; and "Self-Efficacy: May the Force Be With You" at the 32nd Annual Parkinson's Symposium of the Oregon Health & Science University in 2015.
