= Children's Book Council (United States) =

US nonprofit trade association

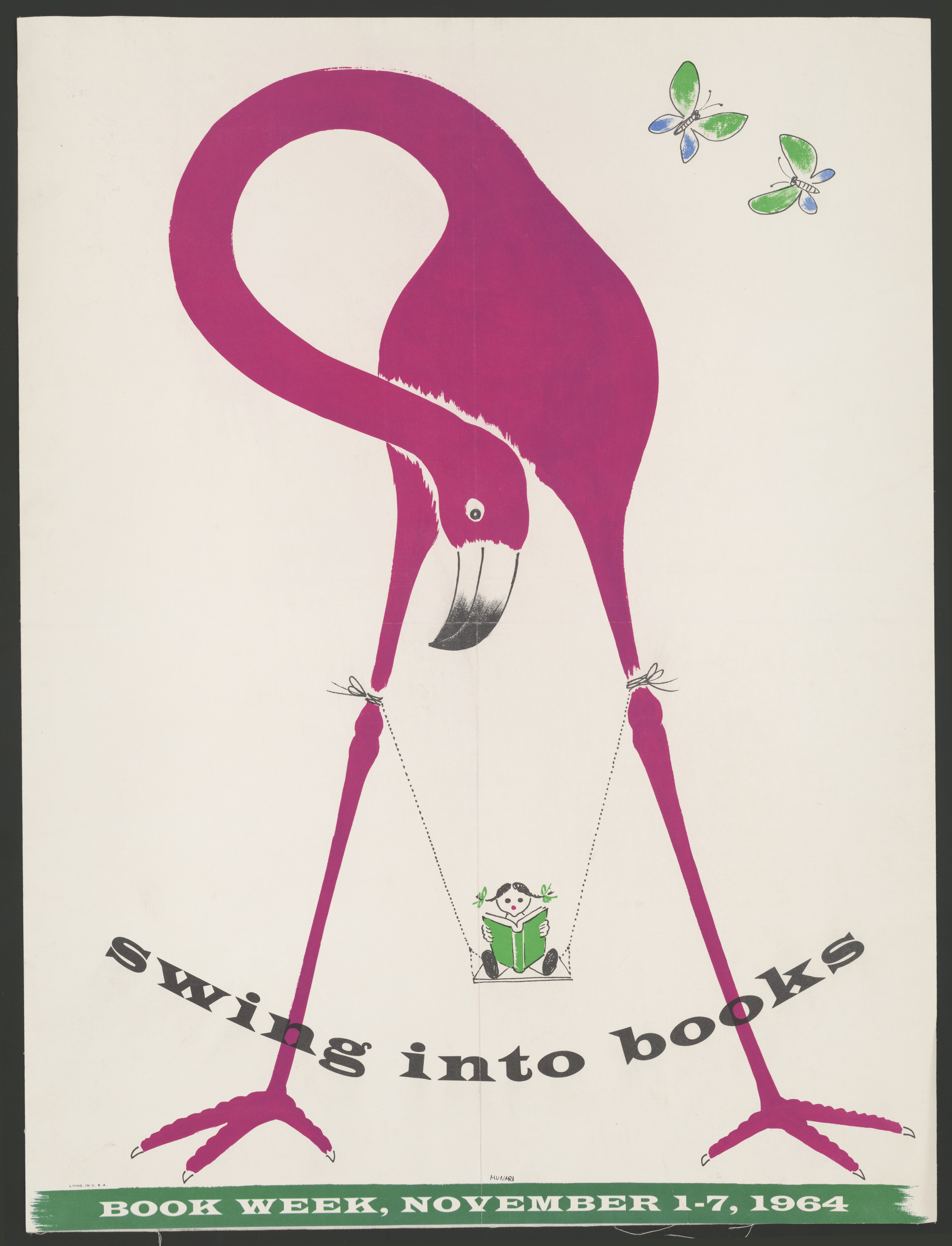
Poster for Children's Book Week, 1964

The Children's Book Council (CBC) is a United States "nonprofit trade association of publishers and packagers of trade books and related materials for children and young adults", according to its website, dedicated to promoting children’s books and reading.

The Children's Book Council was originally formed as the Association of Children's Book Editors in 1944. In 1945, the organization was given the responsibility of running Children's Book Week by the event's co-founder, Frederic G. Melcher. CBC organized the annual book week through 2007 after which it was succeeded by Every Child a Reader, the industry's "philanthropic arm", and it became a sponsor.

Past CBC leaders include John Donovan, Sybil V. Jacobsen, Laura Harris, Joanna Foster Dougherty, Eunice Blake Bohanon, Sophie Silberberg, and Paula Quint. As of January 2022, the current chair of the CBC's board of directors is Yolanda Scott.
