= Mary Otis Stevens =

American architect (1928–2026)

- Born: March 28, 1928; New York City, U.S.
- Died: July 12, 2026 (aged 98)
- Education: Smith College; Massachusetts Institute of Technology
- Occupation: Architect

Mary Otis Stevens (March 28, 1928 – July 12, 2026) was an American architect in Cambridge, Massachusetts. The MIT Museum describes her as "one of the most important female architects in the Northeast during the 1960s and 1970s."

== Early life and education ==
Born in New York City to an affluent family descended from leading figures in the American Revolution, Stevens attended Smith College, where she received a degree in philosophy in 1949. She was active in the civil rights movement during her undergraduate years, presaging a lifelong commitment to social and civic activism. In 1950, she married William Vaughn Moody Fawcett. Stevens entered the architecture program at MIT in 1953, graduating with an SBArch in 1956. Influences at MIT included Alvar Aalto, Eero Saarinen, Kevin Lynch, and Buckminster Fuller, who was also a family friend. Other influences included the historian Samuel Eliot Morison, a relative and father figure.

== Work ==
Stevens worked for The Architects' Collaborative (TAC) before launching a practice with MIT faculty member Thomas McNulty in 1956, whom she married after her 1958 divorce. Stevens and McNulty practiced together until 1969, when they founded i Press Inc., a publisher of books on architecture and urban theory, which Stevens directed until its dissolution in 1978. Stevens also founded Design Guild in 1975, a collaborative architecture practice focusing on adaptive reuse and sustainability.

== Later life and death ==
After the death of Jesse Fillman in 1991, a lawyer whom she married in 1978, Stevens disbanded Design Guild to pursue studies in music composition at Longy School of Music. In 2007, she donated her archives to MIT.

Stevens died on July 12, 2026, at the age of 98.

== Significant projects ==
Stevens is best known for the Lincoln House (1965), which she designed with Tom McNulty for their own family on a rural site in Lincoln, Massachusetts, a suburb of Boston. The curvilinear concrete structure, which is often called the first exposed-concrete and glass house in the United States, won international attention. Stevens lived in the house until 1978, when she and McNulty sold it to Sarah Caldwell, the renowned opera director. Stevens and McNulty divorced soon after. The house was widely published, but was demolished in 2001 after Caldwell sold the property.

== Other significant work ==
- Milan Triennial XIV, 1968 (with McNulty and Gyorgy Kepes)
- Torf House, Weston, Massachusetts
- The Barns at Wolf Trap, Vienna, Virginia, 1981.
- World of Variation, Mary Otis Stevens and Thomas F. McNulty, G. Braziler, 1970.

Stevens was also featured in Season 9 (1987) of the television series This Old House for her work on the Benjamin Weatherbee House built in 1785 (Westwood, Massachusetts).
