= Valerie Worth =

American poet

- Born: Valerie Worth; October 29, 1933; Philadelphia, Pennsylvania, United States
- Died: July 31, 1994 (aged 60); Clinton, New York, United States
- Occupations: Writer and poet
- Spouse: George Bahlke
- Writing career
- Language: English
- Genre: Children's literature

Valerie Worth Bahlke (October 29, 1933 – July 31, 1994) was an American poet and writer of children's books under her maiden name, Valerie Worth.

== Awards ==
In 1991, Worth was awarded the NCTE Award for Excellence in Poetry for Children by the National Council of Teachers of English.

== Works ==
- The Crone's Book of Words (1971)
- Small Poems (1972)
- More Small Poems. (1976)
- Still More Small Poems (1978)
- Curlicues: The Fortunes of Two Pug Dogs (1980)
- Gypsy Gold (1983)
- Fox Hill (1986)
- Small Poems Again (1986)
- All the Small Poems (1987)
- The Crone's Book of Wisdom (1988)
- At Christmastime (1992)
- All the Small Poems and Fourteen More (1994)
