= Amy Bess Miller =

American historian (1912–2003)

- Born: May 4, 1912; El Paso, Texas, United States
- Died: February 23, 2003 (aged 90); Pittsfield, Massachusetts
- Education: Bancroft School; Miss Hall's School; Sorbonne
- Occupations: Historian; historic preservationist; curator; civic leader; antiquarian; trustee; Founder of Hancock Shaker Village
- Organization: American Antiquarian Society
- Known for: Hancock Shaker Village
- Title: President of the Berkshire Athenaeum (1944-1979); President of Hancock Shaker Village (1959-1990); Commissioner for Massachusetts Board of Library Commissioners (1964-1970)
- Spouse: Lawrence K. "Pete" Miller (m. 1933-1991)

Amy Bess Williams Miller (May 4, 1912 – February 23, 2003) was an American historian, preservationist, trustee, and civic leader from the cities of Worcester and Pittsfield, Massachusetts. Best known for leading the effort to preserve Hancock Shaker Village on the border of Pittsfield and Hancock, Massachusetts and establish a museum there, she was a major scholar of Shaker history, society, and artifacts. In addition to serving as the Hancock museum's first president, she was president of the Berkshire Athenaeum, member of the Massachusetts Board of Library Commissioners and American Antiquarian Society, and trustee of Berkshire Medical Center, the Berkshire Museum, Miss Hall's School, the Massachusetts Audubon Society, and the Shaker Museum and Library. Miller's published works all deal with Shaker history and society. She wrote four books and co-edited a fifth, contributed an article to The Herbarist, and contributed to numerous exhibits.

== Biography ==
Amy Bess Williams was born on May 4, 1912, in El Paso, Texas to Dr. Frederick R. Williams and Elizabeth Avery Taft Williams. At the age of five, her family relocated to Worcester, Massachusetts. During the 1920s, Williams gained a reputation as a socialite, and often visited events held by the American Antiquarian Society. She studied at the preparatory schools Bancroft School in Worcester and Miss Hall's School in Pittsfield, and then attended the Sorbonne, where she specialized in art history and architecture. On October 14, 1933, Williams married Lawrence K. "Pete" Miller, who was then editor and publisher of his family's newspaper The Berkshire Eagle. Among the wedding presents the couple received was a table made by the Shakers, an American Christian sect. This gift is credited with sparking Miller's lifelong interest in the Shakers.

In 1944, Miller became president of the Berkshire Athenaeum, a public library in Pittsfield, holding that position until 1979. In the late 1950s she led a project to preserve what remained of the Hancock Village, as the few remaining Shakers there planned to leave. The project resulted in the transformation of the Village into a museum, which opened in 1960. Miller served as president of this museum until 1990. From 1964 to 1970, Miller served on the Massachusetts Board of Library Commissioners, and, in 1972, Miller successfully advocated for the construction of a new library building to house the Berkshire Athenaeum collection. In 1976, she was inducted into the American Antiquarian Society, to which she contributed regularly. She additionally served as a long-term trustee of Berkshire Medical Center, the Berkshire Museum, Miss Hall's School, the Massachusetts Audubon Society, and the Shaker Museum and Library. She was also the first woman president of the Pittsfield Community Chest.

Miller's husband Lawrence died in 1991. The couple had four children: a daughter Margo and sons Kelton II, Michael, and Mark. Michael and Mark published and edited, respectively, the Eagle until it was sold to MediaNews Group in 1995. Miller died on February 23, 2003, and a memorial service was held at Hancock Shaker Village. Her collection of Shaker furniture was donated to the museum.

== Awards ==
Miller was awarded honorary degrees from Williams College, North Adams State College, Rhode Island School of Design, and Muhlenberg College. She also received a national preservation award from the Garden Club of America.

== Bibliography ==
- Miller, Amy Bess Williams (June 1, 1972). Darragh, William C. (ed.). "A Shaker heritage". The Herbarist (38). Boston: Herb Society of America: 13–19. ISSN 0740-5979. OCLC 399892733.
- Miller, Amy Bess Williams (1976). Shaker Herbs : a History and a Compendium. New York: Clarkson N. Potter Publishers. ISBN 9780517524947. OCLC 476947309.
- Miller, Amy Bess; Ott, John H. (1974). "Captions". The Shaker Image. By Pearson, Julia Neal; Shaker Community, Inc. Pearson, Elmer R. (ed.). Boston: New York Graphic Society. ISBN 9780821205396. OCLC 1272452.
- Miller, Amy Bess Williams (1976) [First-pub. 1843]. "Introduction". In Crossman, Charles F.; New Lebanon Shakers (eds.). The gardener's manual: containing plain instructions for the selection, preparation, and management of a kitchen garden; with practical directions for the cultivation and management of some of the most useful culinary vegetables (2nd ed.). Hancock, Massachusetts; original location New Lebanon, New York: Hancock Shaker Village; originally published by the United Society at New Lebanon. OCLC 78471903. Facsimile reprint with introduction by Miller.
- Miller, Amy Bess Williams (1983). Hancock Shaker Village: A Consuming Interest. Pittsfield, Massachusetts: Eagle Print Shop. OCLC 785831580.
- Miller, Amy Bess Williams; Fuller, Persis Wellington, eds. (1983). The Best of Shaker Cooking. Magnolia, Massachusetts: Peter Smith Publishing. ISBN 9780844660318. OCLC 89096.
- Miller, Amy Bess Williams (1984). Hancock Shaker Village: The City of Peace; An Effort to Restore a Vision 1960—1985. Hancock: Hancock Shaker Village. ISBN 9780961355500. OCLC 247618813.
- Miller, Amy Bess (1998). Shaker Medicinal Herbs: A Compendium of History, Lore, and Uses. Pownal, Vermont: Storey Books. ISBN 1-58017-040-4. OCLC 40610021.
