= Milan Triennial XIV =

Overview
- BIE-class: Triennial exposition
- Name: Milan Triennial XIV
- Motto: The Large Number
- Building(s): Palazzo del Arte

Participant(s)
- Countries: 14

Location
- Country: Italy
- City: Milan
- Coordinates: 45°28′19.92″N 9°10′24.78″E

Timeline
- Awarded: 11 May 1966
- Opening: 23 June 1968
- Closure: 28 July 1968

Triennial expositions
- Previous: Milan Triennial XIII in Milan
- Next: Milan Triennial XV in Milan

The Milan Triennial XIV was the Triennial in Milan sanctioned by the Bureau of International Expositions (BIE) on the 11 May 1966. Its theme was The Large Number. It was held at the Palazzo dell'Arte and ran from 23 June 1968 to 28 July 1968.

After the opening ceremony several exhibits were destroyed by students invading the triennial, leading to opening being delayed for a month.

Mary Otis Stevens participated, and Helmiriitta Honkanen and Armas Nyberg won Grand Prix.
