= Jack Plank Tells Tales =

2007 novel by Natalie Babbitt

- Author: Natalie Babbitt
- Cover artist: N. Babbitt
- Subject: Pirates
- Genre: Children's books
- Publisher: Scholastic, Inc.
- Publication date: 2007
- Publication place: United States

Jack Plank Tells Tales is a children's novel written by Newbery Honor recipient Natalie Babbitt. Her first novel in 25 years, it was released by Scholastic, Inc. in 2007.

== Plot ==
The book contains connected stories dealing with an inept and humane pirate, Jack Plank, who has trouble finding work that suits him and his inhibitions.

== Reception ==
The book received a starred review from Booklist in April 2007, and the School Library Journal gave it a most favorable review.
