= Charlotte Samuels =

American swimmer (born 1998)

Personal information
- Born: November 28, 1998 (age 27) Ridgewood, New Jersey

Sport
- Sport: Swimming
- Strokes: Long-distance swimming

Charlotte Samuels (born November 28, 1998) is an American swimmer. She is believed to be the youngest person to complete the 17.5-mile Ederle Swim from New York City's Battery Park to Sandy Hook, New Jersey, which she did at age 15 in 2013. She finished the swim in 5:38:41. She was featured in Sports Illustrated for this accomplishment.

Samuels began competitive swimming with the Ridgewood Breakers when she was six. In 2013, she switched to the Bergen Barracudas. In 2010, she competed in an open-water championship in the National Harbor on the Potomac River, and in 2011 she competed in the Liberty Island Swim, a 1.2 kilometer counterclockwise swim around the Statue of Liberty. Also in 2011, Samuels won first place in the Brooklyn Bridge swim, which was across the East River starting from a pebble beach at Brooklyn Bridge Park and continuing to the Manhattan side. In 2013, she competed in the Manhattan Island Marathon Swim (though it was cut short when the swimmers missed hitting the forward currents ahead of them in the Hudson River, and could not swim any further) and also competed in the inaugural 15.1-mile (24.3 km) Cape Circumnavigation Challenge around Cape May, New Jersey.
