= Frank G. Carpenter =

American photographer

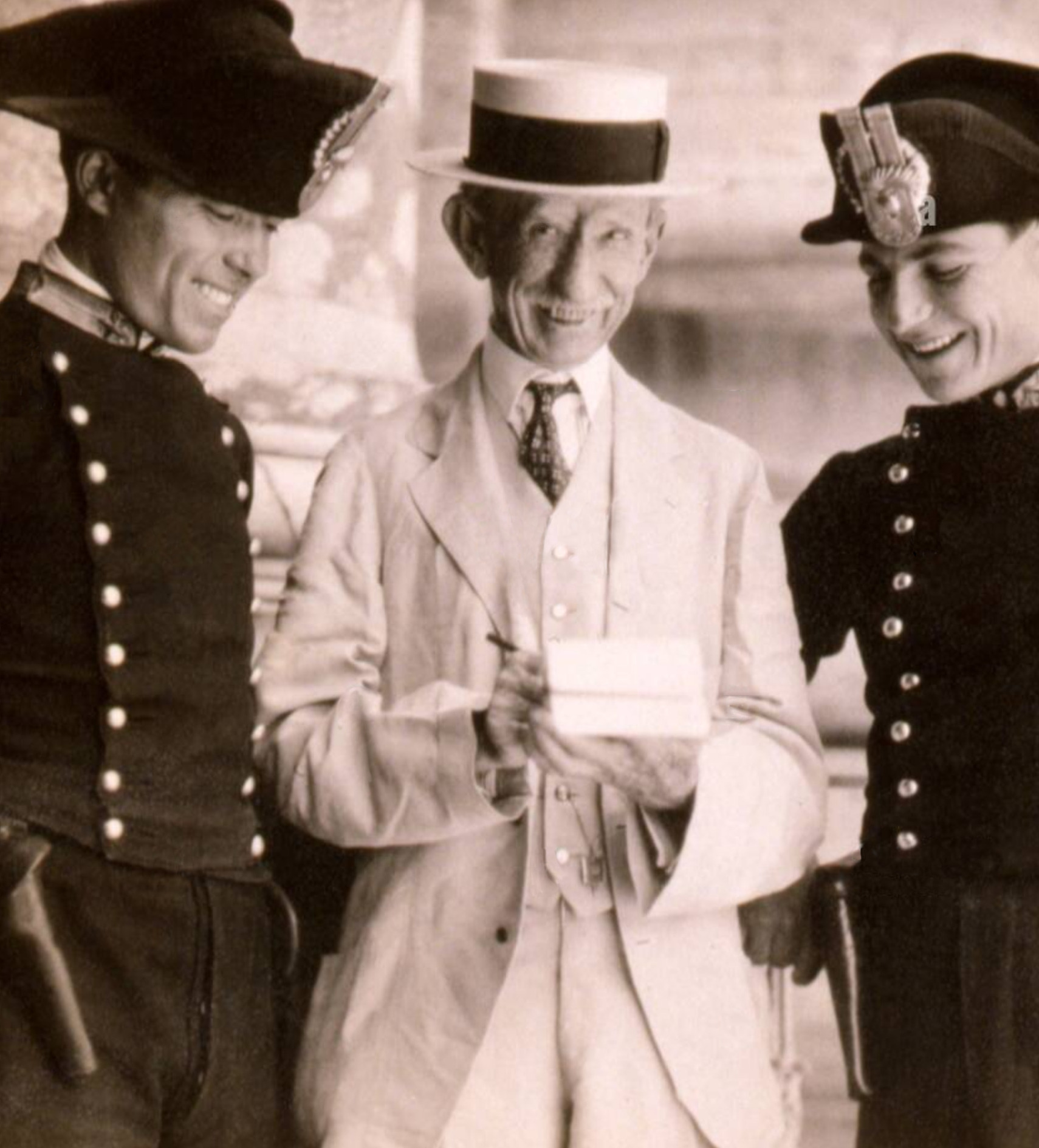
- Frank G. Carpenter in Rome (1923), age 68
- Born: May 8, 1855; Mansfield, Ohio
- Died: June 18, 1924 (aged 69); Nanking
- Occupations: Author, geographer, photographer, lecturer, collector of photographs
- Spouse: Joanna Condict
- Children: Frances Carpenter, John Carpenter (athlete)

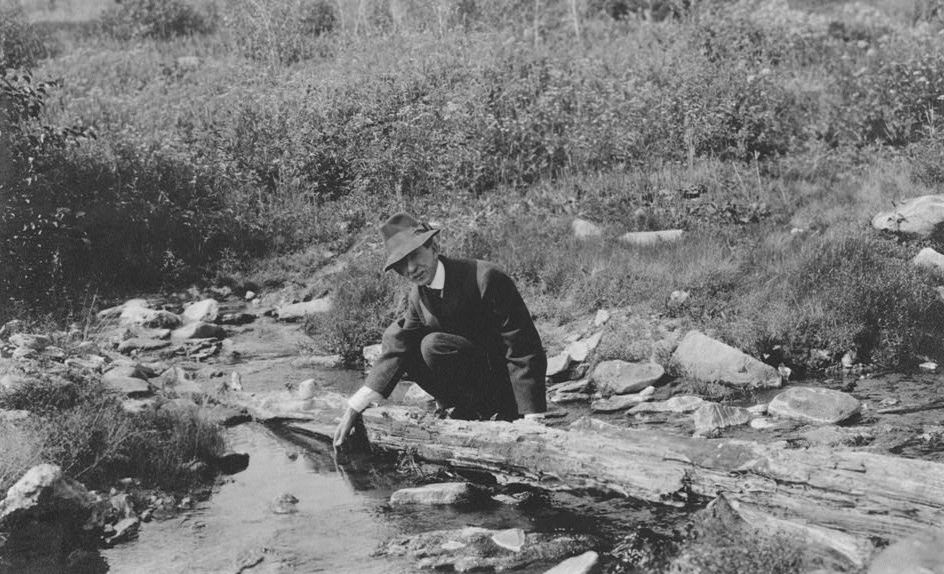
Frank Carpenter near Hot Springs, Alaska.

Frank George Carpenter (May 8, 1855 in Mansfield, Ohio – June 18, 1924 in Nanking) was a journalist, traveler, travel writer, photographer, and lecturer. Carpenter was a writer of geography textbooks and lecturer on geography, and wrote a series of books called Carpenter's World Travels. His writings helped popularize cultural anthropology and geography.

== Biography ==
=== Early life ===
Carpenter was born in Mansfield, Ohio, son of George F. and Jennette L. Carpenter. He graduated with a bachelor's degree from University of Wooster in 1877. He began working as a journalist for the Cleveland Leader in 1879, and in 1882 he moved to Washington DC as the correspondent there. He married Joanna D. Condict of Mansfield in 1883. In 1884 he became a correspondent for the American Press Association. In 1887 he worked for the New York World. By this point his writings were being widely syndicated to other newspapers and magazines around the USA.

=== World Traveler ===
Carpenter collected enough assignments with newspaper syndicates and Cosmopolitan Magazine to pay for a trip around the world in 1888–1889. He was charged with sending a "letter" each week to twelve periodicals, describing life in the countries to which he traveled.

Following this trip's completion, he continued to travel extensively, logging 25,000 miles in South America in 1898, and later doing letter-writing tours of Central America, South America, and Europe. From the mid-1890s until he died, Carpenter traveled almost continuously around the world, authoring nearly 40 books and many magazine articles about his travels. His travels and writings were so extensive historians have trouble placing his exact whereabouts at any given time, though his books speak to where he went.

His writings include personal memoirs and what he called 'geographical readers' for use in geography classes. These would remain standard texts used in American schools for forty years. His writings helped popularize cultural anthropology and geography. He has been noted for his 1922 study of the regeneration of Europe after WWI, and the first granted interview with Chinese statesman Li Hung Chang.

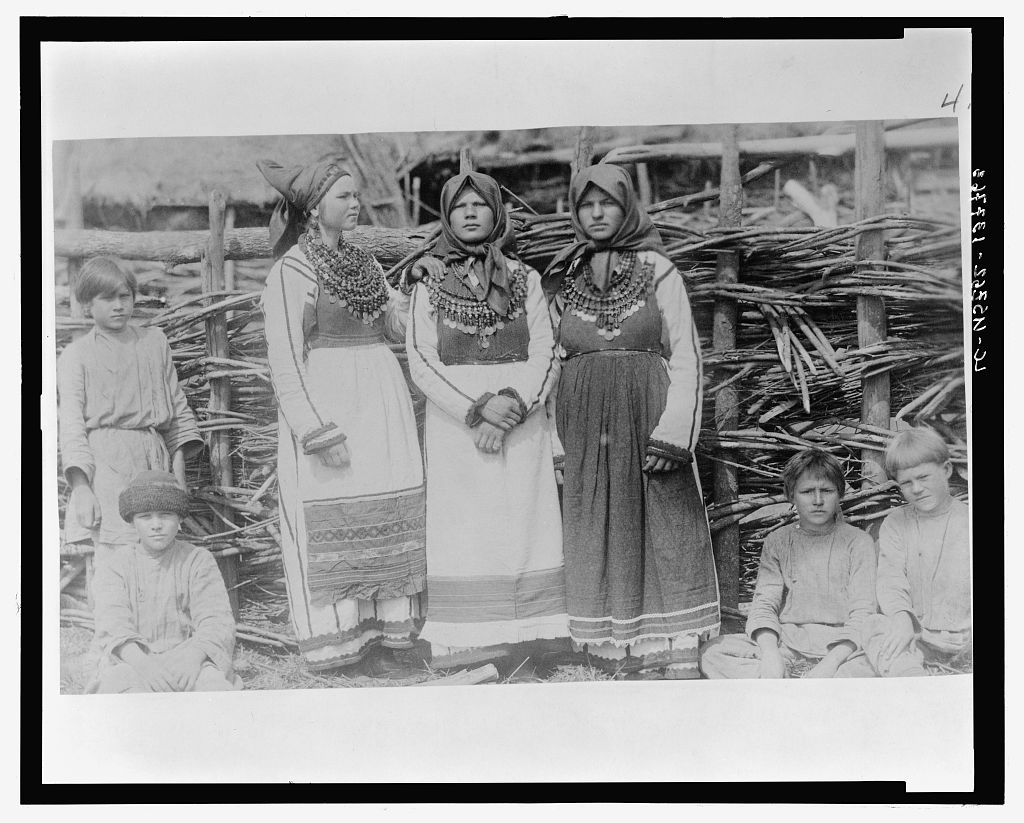
photograph by Carpenter of three young women wearing ceremonial dress.

He traveled with his wife, and while not traveling they stayed in Washington, D.C., or at their home near the Shenandoah Valley in the summers. He had two children. His real estate holdings in Washington made him a millionaire. He was a Fellow of the Royal Geographical Society, the National Press Club, and numerous scientific societies.

With his daughter Frances Carpenter, Carpenter photographed Alaska between 1910 and 1924. A collection of over 5,000 images were donated to the Library of Congress by Frances at her death in 1972. The collection at the Library of Congress totals approximately 16,800 photographs and about 7,000 negatives.

Carpenter died of sickness in 1924 while in Nanking, China, on his third round the world trip. The Boston Globe obituary observed he "always wrote fascinatingly, always in a language the common man and woman could understand, always of subjects even children are interested in. [He] had a genius for finding out things, and the things that interest everyone, and then for writing them interestingly."

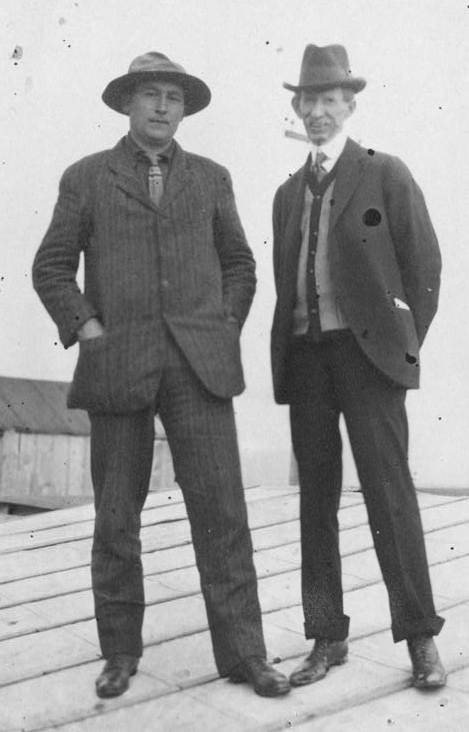
Carpenter with Jafet Lindeberg

== Works ==
Books by Frank G. Carpenter.

- Carpenter's Geographical Readers series (pub by the American Book Company)

- Asia (1897)
- North America (1898)
- Through Asia with the children (1898)
- Through America with the children (1898)
- South America (1899)
- Europe (1902)
- Australia, our colonies and other islands of the sea (1904)
- Africa (1905)

- Carpenter's World Travels series (pub by Doubleday):

- Holy Land and Syria (1922)
- From Tangier to Tripoli (1923)
- Alaska: our Northern Wonderland (1923)
- The Tail of the Hemisphere: Chile and Argentina (1923)
- Cairo to Kisumu (1923)
- Java and East Indies (1923)
- France to Scandinavia (1923)
- New Zealand and some islands of the South Pacific (1923)
- The Alps, The Danube, and the Near East (1924)
- Canada and Newfoundland (1924)
- Mexico (1924)
- Uganda to the Cape (1924)
- Along the Parana and The Amazon (1925)
- China (1925)
- Japan and Korea (1925)
- Land of the Caribbean (1925)
- Through the Philippines and Hawaii (1925)
- Lands of the Andes and the Desert (1926)
- The British Isles and the Baltic States (1926)
- Carp's Washington (1960, ed. by Frances Carpenter)

- Carpenter's Readers of Commerce and Industry series (pub by American Book Company)

- South America: Social, Industrial and Political (1900)
- How the World is Fed (1907)
- How the World is Clothed (1909)
- How the World is Housed (1911)
- Around the World with the Children (1917)

- Carpenter's New Geographical Readers series (pub by American Book Company)

- South America (1923)
- Europe (1922)
- North America (1922)
- Asia (1923)
- Africa (1923)

- Carpenters' Journey Club Travels series (pub by American Book Company). Co-author Frances Carpenter.

- The Houses We Live In (1926)
- The Clothes We Wear (1926)

== Additional Information ==
- Frank and Frances Carpenter Collection at the Library of Congress
- Frank G. Carpenter Papers, 1855-1924, Sophia Smith Collection, Smith College.
