= Nina Browne =

American librarian and archivist

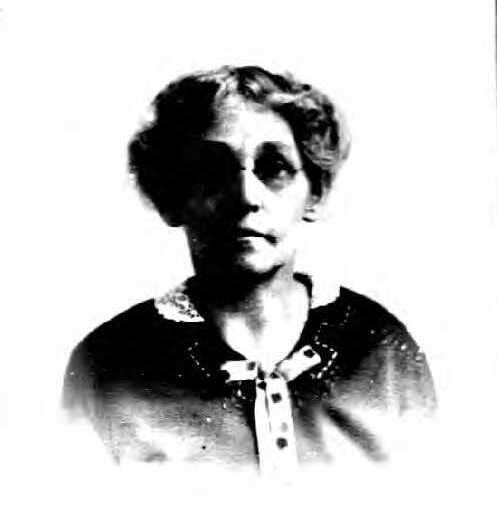
- Born: October 6, 1860; Erving, Massachusetts
- Died: October 6, 1954 (aged 94); Jamaica Plain, Massachusetts
- Education: Smith College (AB 1882, MA 1885), University of the State of New York (BLS 1891)
- Occupations: Librarian, Archivist

Nina Eliza Browne (October 6, 1860 – October 6, 1954) was an American librarian and archivist. She was employed as a librarian at Harvard University and Boston Athenæum, a registrar at American Library Association, and an archivist at Smith College. She invented a charging system, known as the Browne Issue System, for libraries by 1895. She was a member, secretary, and publishing board member of the American Library Association, and was a member of the Massachusetts Library Association.

== Early life ==
Nina Eliza (or Elizabeth) Browne was born in Erving, Massachusetts on October 6, 1860. Her parents were Charles Theodore Browne and Nancy S. Chapman Browne. She lived in Boston and remained unmarried.

== Education ==
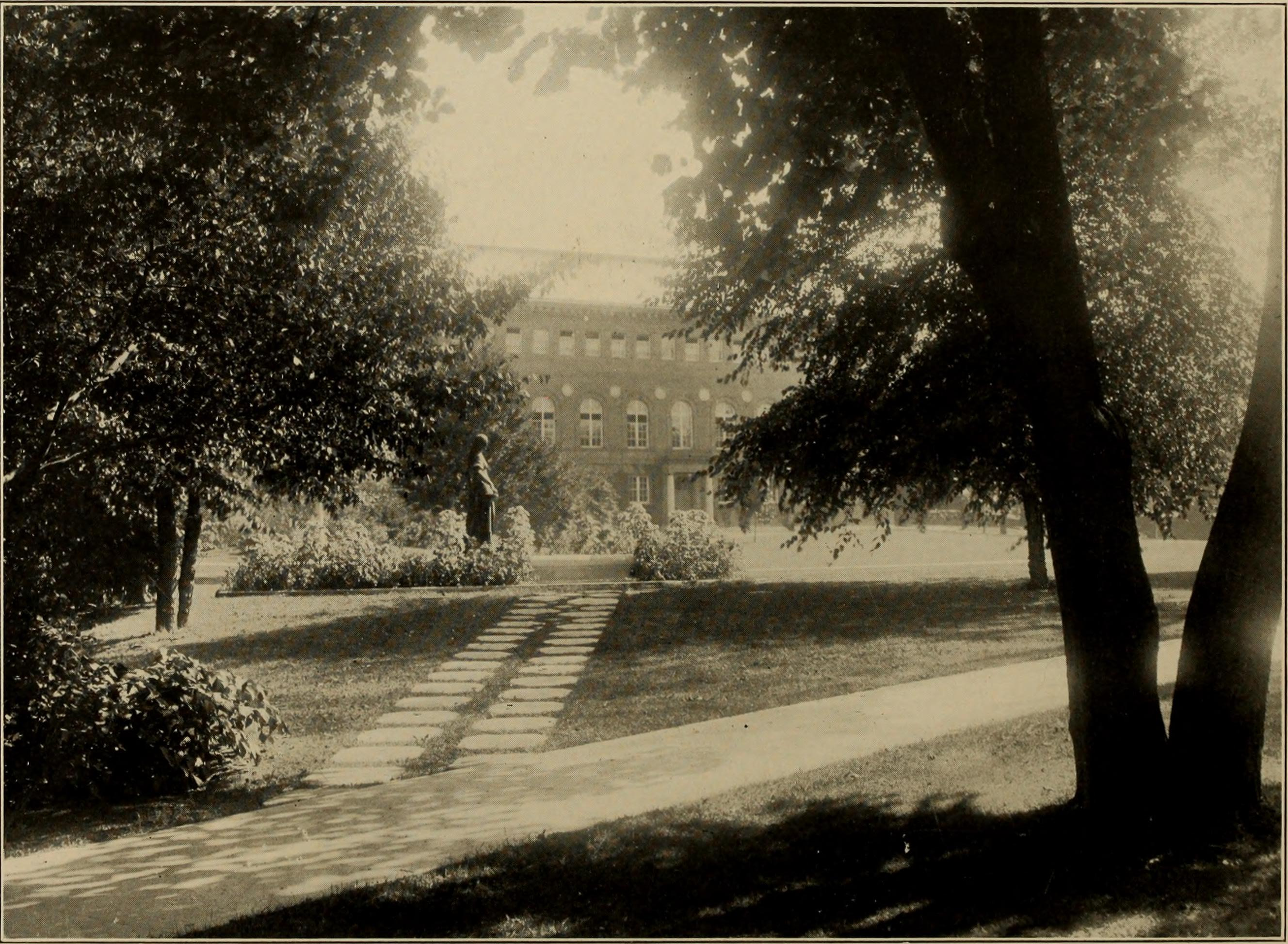
Smith College, Northampton, Massachusetts, about 1921, where she received her bachelor's (1882) and master's degrees (1885) and worked as an archivist, beginning in 1921.

Browne earned a bachelor's in 1882 and master's degree in 1885 from Smith College and, at the recommendation of a classmate, attended Columbia College's fledgling School of Library Economy. Browne and forty-three classmates studied under Melvil Dewey during the two years he taught at Columbia. The class was taught in an erstwhile storeroom, because women were not permitted to enter classrooms.

Though Columbia's program did not grant degrees in its early years, in 1889 Dewey (then State Librarian of New York) successfully petitioned on behalf of his students. After completion of sixteen proficiency examinations, a subject bibliography, and a thesis, Browne and one other student were awarded Bachelor of Library Science degrees from the University of the State of New York in 1891.

== Career ==
=== Early career ===
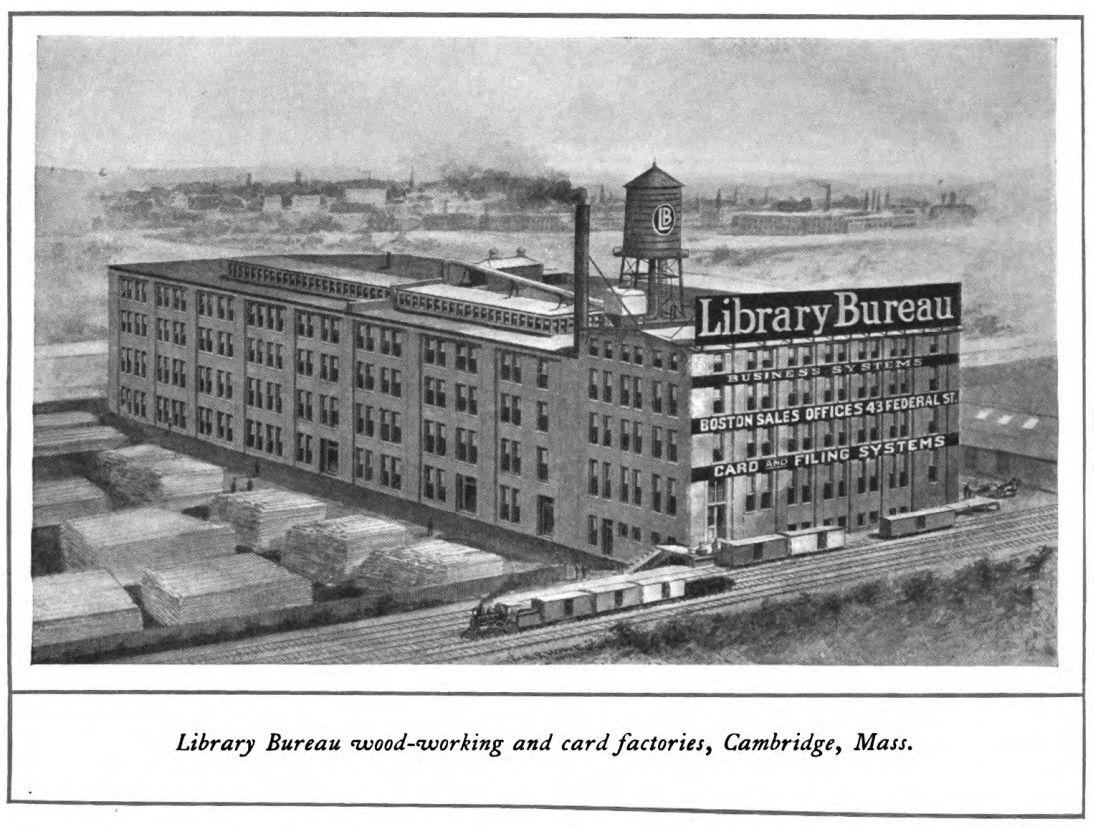
Boston's Library Bureau, Cambridge, Massachusetts

Browne had a brief career as a teacher, between her graduation from Smith and her studies at Columbia. She was an assistant librarian at Columbia University's Library in 1888 to 1889. For the next three years she worked at the New York State Library. She worked at the Library Bureau in Boston until 1896. Her work there was described as follows, "The cataloging being done at the Library Bureau, where there is not adequate collection of reference-books, has been hampered by this lack, but for the general accuracy and promptness of the work all praise is due to the energy and enthusiasm of Miss Nina E. Browne, of the Library Bureau."

=== Browne Issue System ===
By 1895, she had invented a library book charging system, called the Browne card lending system, or Browne Issue System. In 1897, she gave a speech to the American Library Association entitled, Classification, catalogs, and modern library appliances. She was a speaker in late March 1901 at the Bi-State Meeting of the Pennsylvania Library Club and the New Jersey Library Association. The topic was the practicality of use of cooperative printed cards for libraries. It was decided that this would be most useful and cost-effective for large libraries. At that point, the use of library cards was experimental.

=== Continued career ===
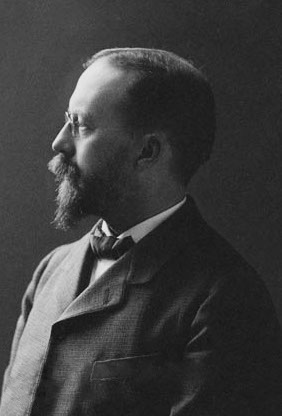
William Coolidge Lane, her co-editor on the A.L.A. portrait index, and fellow member of the American Library Association

She was co-editor with William Coolidge Lane of the A.L.A Portrait Index, published in 1906. It was an index of portraits that were published in books and periodicals. The prior year, she published A Bibliography of Nathaniel Hawthorne. Browne also created a Catalog of Officers, Graduates, and Nongraduates of Smith College.

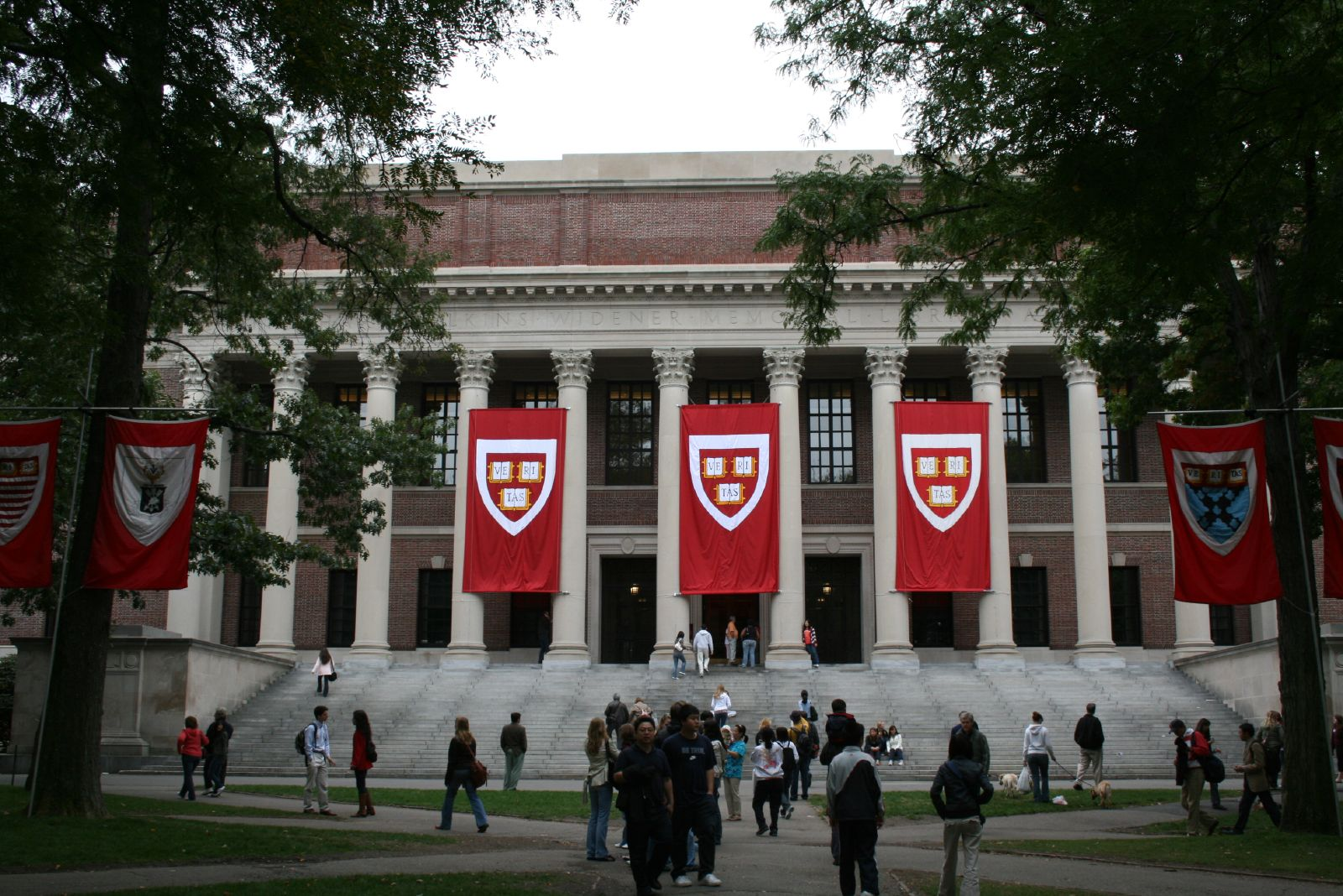
Widener Library, Harvard University

She was an assistant librarian at Harvard University, beginning in 1911, and at the Boston Athenaeum.

Browne's career as an archivist began in 1921, when she was hired by Smith College as its first archivist of the Smith College Archives. Browne had been active in the Alumna Association, and material from her time as a student (saved by her mother) formed the basis of the early collection. Though she was initially hired with an eye to the college's 50th anniversary in 1925, she remained in her position long after the event. She became partially blind, which set her retirement in motion in 1937. Browne remained a strong advocate for the archive, asserting its importance and the need for a physical space for the collection. Margaret Storrs Grierson stepped into the role of college archivist in 1940.

== Death ==
Browne had been living in Jamaica Plain, Massachusetts at the Trinity Church Home, when she died on October 6, 1954, at the age of 94.

== Library associations ==
Browne was a member of the Massachusetts Library Club, now the Massachusetts Library Association, and encouraged other librarians to perform outreach to the communities to determine their interests. For instance, by 1896, she recommended contacting the heads of labor unions to determine what books their members and other people within the community might enjoy reading. It was said of this effort, "Nothing is more needed than to make artisans and the leaders of trade unions believe that the library exists for their benefit, and induce them to use it for informing themselves on economic matters and all questions of the day."

She was assistant secretary and then secretary of the American Library Association for many years, beginning in 1889, and was on its publishing board, for a term that was to expire in 1914. Browne was the ALA's registrar from 1889 or 1909. By 1909, she had attended 20 of the ALA's conventions, which were held in cities throughout the United States and two international conventions in London.

== Honors ==
In 1930, Smith College awarded Browne an honorary Doctorate of Letters.
