= Par (command) =

Unix text formatting program

par
- Original author(s): Adam M. Costello
- Repository: bitbucket.org/amc-nicemice/par/
- Operating system: Unix and Unix-like
- Type: Command
- Website: www.nicemice.net/par/

The computer program par is a text formatting utility for Unix and Unix-like operating systems, written by Adam M. Costello as a replacement for the fmt command.

Par reformats paragraphs of text to fit into a given line length optimally, keeping prefixes and suffixes intact, which is useful for formatting source code comments. It also understands the conventions commonly used for quoting in email replies, and is capable of intelligently reformatting these several levels deep while rewrapping the text they quote.

Par can be invoked from text editors such as Vim or Emacs. To support Unicode par needs to be compiled with a patch that adds multi-byte character support, typically, UTF-8 encoding. Unlike fmt, par also supports text justification.
