= Stoner Winslett =

American ballet director

- Born: Linda Stoner Winslett; 1958 (age 67–68); Columbia, South Carolina
- Education: Smith College
- Occupation: Founding artistic director of the Richmond Ballet
- Years active: 1980–2024

Linda Stoner Winslett (born 1958) is an American former ballet dancer and the founding artistic director of the Richmond Ballet. In 2014, she was honored by the Virginia Women in History project of the University of Virginia for her contributions to the community.

== Early life and education ==
Winslett was born in 1958 in Jacksonville, Florida. She began dancing at the age of four, and operated her own ballet studio out of her parents' basement as a teenager. Following her instruction by several ballet dancers in Columbia, South Carolina, Winslett attended the American Ballet Theatre School and the University of North Carolina School of the Arts on scholarship. In her adolescence, however, her height of 5 feet 8.5 inches (1.740 m) was too tall for traditional ballet. By the time she was 22, a series of joint injuries suffered as she tried to accommodate ballet dancing to her height had effectively ended Winslett's onstage career.

Following the end of her dancing career, Winslett attended Smith College, where she graduated summa cum laude as a member of Phi Beta Kappa in 1980. While attending Smith, Winslett made the acquaintance of dancer Gemze de Lappe, who had been working as a guest artist in residence.

== Professional career ==
Shortly after her college graduation, Winslett was hired as the assistant artistic director for the Richmond Ballet, a modest student company. She had been recommended the position by the mother of a classmate at Smith. The artistic director resigned three months later, and Winslett took over her position at the age of 22. In 1984, Winslett helped to found the Richmond Ballet's professional troupe, the first professional ballet company in the state of Virginia, consisting at the time of 12 dancers and a budget of $164,000. In 1988, the Richmond chapter of the YWCA recognized Winslett as their Woman of the Year. In 1990, Douglas Wilder named Richmond the official ballet company of Virginia. In 2008, Winslett and the troupe received the Governor's Award for the Arts for the state of Virginia.

In 1995, Winslett and recently-retired dancer Brett Bonda created Minds In Motion, a program meant to give K-12 students in Virginia the opportunity to develop their ballet dancing. In 2000, Richmond Ballet renovated and occupied a building in downtown Richmond. That same year, Style Weekly recognized Winslett as one of the 100 most influential Richmond citizens of the 20th century. The expansion into a secondary building required an increased budget. Winslett thus created the Studio Series, a series of black box theater repertory performances to supplement the revenue of the main ballet. In 2005, Winslett and the Richmond Ballet did a series of performances at the Joyce Theater in New York. They were invited to return in 2007, 2008, and 2010.

Winslett debuted her signature ballet production Windows in 1999. She began working on the piece, a four-movement work that attempts to trace over 200 years of ballet in the French, Russian, modern, and postmodern era, as part of an independent study project at Smith. She is also known for her arrangement of The Nutcracker. Winslett received a grant in 1999 to finish the piece and commemorate her 20th season with the Richmond Ballet. She used the grant to commission composer Jonathan Romeo to update Paganini's The Four Temperaments score for a contemporary audience.

In 2014, the Virginia Women in History project honored Winslett as one of eight annual Virginia women recognized for their contributions to the community. In 2016, the Greater Richmond Transit Company honored Winslett as part of Women's History Month, highlighting her name on the headers of Richmond-area buses. That same year, Winslett was added to the Richmond Times-Dispatch Person of the Year Hall of Fame.

On July 1, 2024, Winslett stepped down as artistic director of the Richmond Ballet. Ma Cong took over the position, with Winslett serving in an advisory role as founding artistic director.

== Personal life ==
Winslett is married to Donald Irwin. She has four children, Alex, Caroline, Louise and Elizabeth, as well as four grandchildren.
