= Edith Granger =

American poet, writer and indexer (1869–1957)

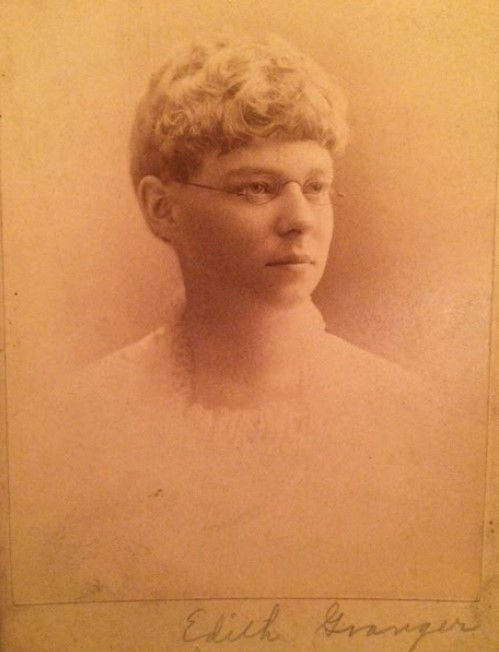
Edith Granger class photo 1891

Edith Lucy Granger (8 October 1869 - 17 September 1957), later Edith Granger Hawkes, was an American poet, writer and indexer. She was editor of 1904's The Granger's Index to Poetry and Recitations (now known as The Columbia Granger's Index to Poetry), a standard library reference of the twentieth and twenty-first century.

== See also ==
- Granger's Index to Poetry and Recitations (1904)
