= Par River =

Par River may refer to several rivers:

- Par River, Cornwall, England
- Par River (Gujarat), India
- Par River (Arunachal Pradesh), India
