= Aubrey Menard =

American author and activist

Aubrey Menard (formerly Menarndt) is a US-based author and activist, known for her book Young Mongols: Forging Democracy In The Wild, Wild East.

== Education ==
Aubrey Menard graduated from Smith College in 2008 with a bachelor's degree. She later earned an MPhil in Politics from the University of Oxford. She was a 2013 U.S. State Department Critical Language Scholar in Bashkortostan, Russia and was associate director of Development at the Truman National Security Project. She was a 2015–2016 Luce Scholar in Mongolia, where she worked as a Policy Advisor to the Mongolian National Chamber of Commerce and Industry.

== Activism ==
Menard worked to rehabilitate survivors of landmine accidents in Central America. After volunteering at the Walking Unidos Clinic in Nicaragua in January 2008, Menard organized an exhibition of photographs by Stephen Petegorsky at Smith College, from February 5, 2008 – March 23, 2008. The exhibition raised money for landmine victims in coffee-growing communities. In 2017, Menard joined the Board of Directors of the LGBT Centre Mongolia. In 2018, Menard collected LGBT books donated by people in the Pioneer Valley, MA, to donate to the LGBT Center in Ulaanbaatar, Mongolia. Menard has also worked in Ukraine as an international election observer.

== Publications ==
Menard has written for The Washington Post, South China Morning Post, Politico, Al Jazeera, New America, Ms Magazine, Menard's 2019 op-ed in The New York Times, "Let Prisoners Vote" led to an interview on The Brian Lehrer Show.

In July 2020, Menard released her first book, Young Mongols: Forging Democracy In The Wild, Wild East, published by Penguin Random House. The book grew from a video series of the same name that was released in 2016. For the book Menard interviewed young Mongolian activists in different spheres. The Asian Review of Books called the book "profoundly hopeful" and The Straits Times found it "compelling".
