= Miss Hall's School =

Girls school in Pittsfield, Massachusetts, US

Coordinates: 42°25′21.82″N 73°14′41.63″W

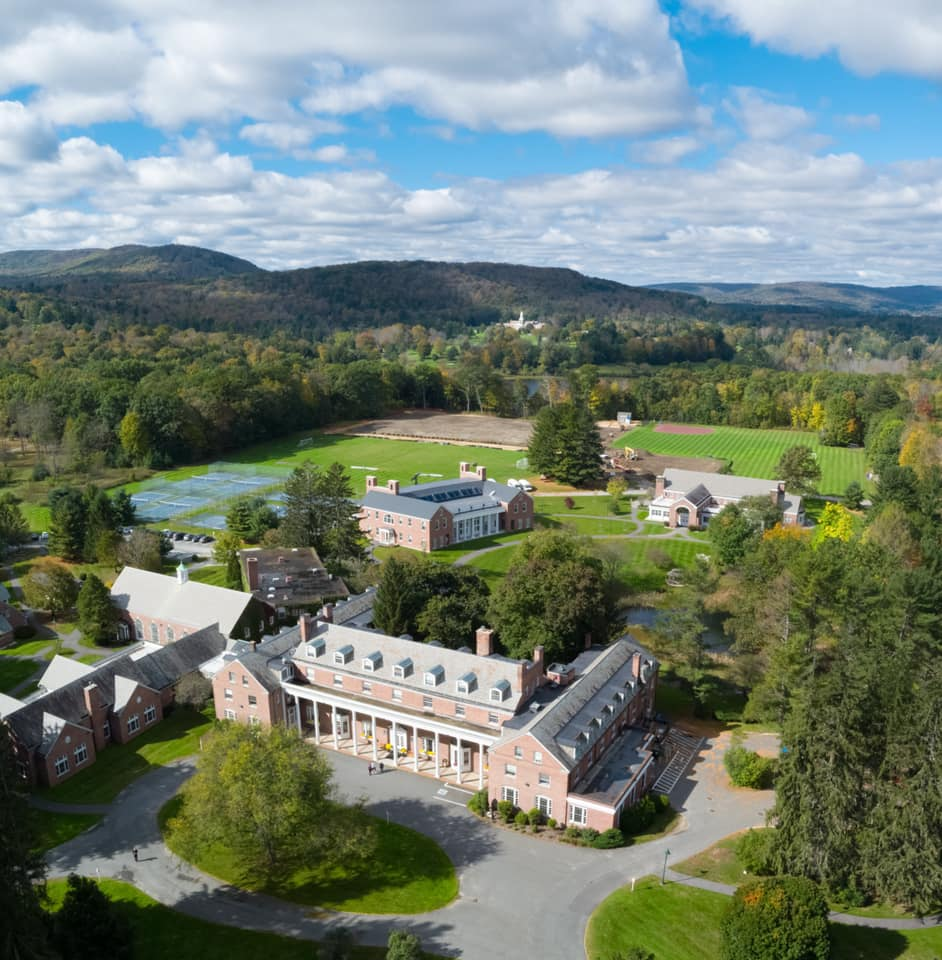
- Campus
- Pittsfield, Massachusetts; United States

Information
- Type: All girls, independent
- Motto: Meus Honor Stat (My Honor Stands)
- Established: 1898 by Mira Hinsdale Hall
- Head of School: Julia Nakano Heaton
- Faculty: 30
- Grades: 9-12
- Enrollment: 189 (2023–2024)
- Average class size: 11
- Colors: Blue and gold
- Mascot: Hurricanes
- Tuition: $60,600 Boarding / $36,750 Day
- Website: misshalls.org

Miss Hall's School is an independent boarding and day school for grades 9-12 located in Pittsfield, Massachusetts. Founded in 1898 by Mira Hinsdale Hall, a graduate of Smith College, it was one of the first girls' boarding schools established in New England.

== History ==
Miss Hall's School dates its founding to 1898, when Mira Hinsdale Hall began her forty-year leadership of the School, an era that brought the School to the forefront of women's independent secondary education. The School moved in 1909 to its present location at 492 Holmes Road in Pittsfield. While still offering two courses of study, "general academic" and "college preparatory", Miss Hall's School grew in reputation, and Mira Hall was well established nationally as a progressive educator of young women.

In February 1923, a fire broke out in the ceiling of the gymnasium. All of the students and faculty escaped safely, but the fire took the life of one employee and destroyed the estate. Mira Hall was then sixty years old, and chose to rebuild her school. In October 1924, she took occupancy of the Georgian building. It was at that time that the School incorporated as a nonprofit educational institution and established a self-perpetuating board of trustees. Winthrop M. Crane Jr., became the first board president.

On August 25, 1937, Mira Hall died suddenly while on vacation in Maine. She was succeeded in 1937 by her niece, Margaret Hinsdale Hall. Elizabeth M. Fitch became Headmistress in 1948, and, during her nineteen years, the School grew to 180 students. Richard E. McLain was appointed the first Headmaster in July 1967 and resigned in 1969 after alleged misconduct with a student. Donald T. Oakes became Headmaster in 1969 and was responsible for the School's programs in the arts and community service. In 1975, the Board of Trustees approved the enrollment of male day students and the change of the School's name to The Hall School.

Robert B. Bussey was appointed Headmaster in the 1976–77 academic year. Under his leadership, and with the guidance of the Long Range Planning Committee, the School restored its historic name of Miss Hall's School and once again became an all-girls’ school. Enrollment increased to 200, a new dormitory was built, and the Alumnae Association grew and became an active arm of the School. Daniel G. Lee Jr. was appointed Headmaster beginning with the 1984–85 academic year. During his tenure, the library facilities were renovated; and construction included a chemistry lab, Groves Hall, four tennis courts, and a new playing field. Trudy E. Hall (no relation to Mira Hall) was appointed Head of School beginning with the 1992–93 academic year and served in that capacity for four years. The Horizons program, an experiential service-learning program, was also introduced during her tenure.

In July 1996, Jeannie Norris became the ninth Head of Miss Hall's School. Under her leadership and that of a highly skilled and experienced senior staff, the School was aggressively marketed; selectivity in admission was restored; enrollment grew; the curriculum, daily schedule, and yearly calendar were overhauled; Horizons was expanded and established as one of the leading off-campus, service-learning programs in the independent school world; the innovative Girls’ Leadership Project was launched; and annual giving, alumnae participation, and overall fundraising grew dramatically. The School also extended its outreach with signature events such as the Woman of Distinction Award and the Philanthropic Round Table, held annually in New York, and the Board of Visitors gathering, held annually at the School. Following Jeannie Norris's retirement, Dr. Margaret A. Jablonski became the tenth Head of School in July 2012, succeeded in July 2014 by eleventh Head of School Julia Heaton.

Since Julia Heaton's arrival, Miss Hall's School has developed its new Strategic Design, undertaken a campus expansion, and continued the evolution of its academic and student life programs. The Strategic Design, adopted in the summer of 2016, established a new vision, priorities, and goals for the School, while also reaffirming a mission and core values that continue to resonate with alumnae and students. In the fall of 2016, Miss Hall's School opened a new residence hall and an interdisciplinary academic building, Linn Hall, which is home to the School's Math and Science Departments, its STEAM initiative, the Horizons program, and a Department of Engineering and Technology Innovation.

In April 2024, a longtime teacher at the school, Matthew Rutledge, resigned after multiple allegations of sexual abuse of students. Multiple students have stated that after reporting their own experiences of sexual abuse, exploitation and grooming to the administration nothing was done. After one such incident, the administration held an assembly and reprimanded students for spreading rumors, and were threatened with punishment for spreading rumors. The school hired a law firm to conduct an investigation of "a decades-old campus culture of open student-faculty relationships, fear, and repression."

== Notable alumnae ==
- Ubah Ali – anti-FGM activist from Somaliland
- Countess Xenia Czernichev-Besobrasov (1929–1968) – Russian aristocrat
- Jean Erdman – modern dancer, Martha Graham Dance Company
- Elisabeth Gilman – socialist, civil libertarian
- Elizabeth Blodgett Hall – educator, founder Simon's Rock
- Jane Lowry – actress
- Jacqueline Mars – heiress, investor, philanthropist
- Amy Bess Miller – historian, preservationist
- Zelia Peet Ruebhausen – policy advisor, United Nations observer
- Edith Tennent – nursing leader
- Eliza Orne White – prolific writer and novelist, largely while blind and deaf

== See also ==
- List of boarding schools in the United States
- List of high schools in Massachusetts
- Berkshire School
