= Granger's Index to Poetry =

Reference work

Granger's Index to Poetry is a reference work to poetry by Edith Granger.

In a 1964 study of basic reference sources in American public, school, and university libraries, Granger's was rated the second most important index volume, after Readers' Guide to Periodical Literature and before Book Review Digest.

== Bibliography ==
- Wall, C. Edward; Gercken, Richard (December 15, 1970). "Book Reviewing Indexes". RQ. 10 (2): 140–142. ISSN 0033-7072. JSTOR 25824085.
