= Natalie Babbitt =

American children's writer and illustrator (1932–2016)

- Born: Natalie Zane Moore; July 28, 1932; Dayton, Ohio, U.S.
- Died: October 31, 2016 (aged 84); Hamden, Connecticut, U.S.
- Resting place: Grove Street Cemetery; New Haven, Connecticut
- Education: Smith College (BA)
- Occupations: Writer, illustrator
- Years active: 1966–2012
- Spouse: Samuel Fisher Babbitt
- Children: 3
- Awards: Newbery Honor (1971); Christopher Award (1975)

Natalie Zane Babbitt (née Moore; July 28, 1932 – October 31, 2016) was an American writer and illustrator of children's books. Her 1975 novel, Tuck Everlasting, was adapted into two feature films and a Broadway musical. She received the Newbery Honor and Christopher Award, and was the U.S. nominee for the biennial international Hans Christian Andersen Award in 1982.

== Early life and education ==
Natalie Moore was born in Dayton, Ohio, on July 28, 1932. She studied at Laurel School in Cleveland, and Smith College in Northampton, Massachusetts.

== Career ==
The Babbitts collaborated to create The Forty-ninth Magician, a picture book, that Samuel wrote and Natalie illustrated, published by Pantheon Books in 1966. Samuel became too busy to participate, but editor Michael di Capua, at Farrar, Straus, and Giroux, encouraged Natalie to continue producing children's books. After writing and illustrating two short books in verse, she turned to children's novels, and her fourth effort in that vein, Knee-Knock Rise, was awarded a Newbery Honor in 1971.

Tuck Everlasting, published in 1975, was named an ALA Notable book and continues to be popular with teachers. It was ranked 16th among the "Top 100 Chapter Books" of all time in a 2012 survey published by School Library Journal. Two of her books have been adapted as movies: Tuck Everlasting (twice, in 1981 and in 2002) and The Eyes of the Amaryllis in 1982. The former was also adapted as a Broadway musical, which premiered in Atlanta on February 4, 2015, and played on Broadway from April 26 to May 29, 2016.

In addition to her own writing, Babbitt also illustrated a number of books by Valerie Worth. Babbitt died on October 31, 2016, at her home in Hamden, Connecticut. She had recently been diagnosed with lung cancer.

== Critical appraisal ==
With her novel Goody Hall (1971), Babbitt was a finalist in the Edgar Allan Poe Award.

In 1977, The New York Times called Babbitt "indisputably one of our most gifted and ambitious writers for children".

In 1982, another Times reviewer, George Woods, enjoyed Babbitt's Herbert Rowbarge. "Mrs. Babbitt creates a plausible world and peoples it with believable humans, but the most satisfaction comes from the pleasure of her company as she effortlessly takes the reader in velvet-gloved hand to point out life's coincidences and near misses."

In 2002, Melanie Rehak, also writing in the Times, described Babbitt's Tuck Everlasting as a "slim, ruminative" novel, and stated that "From the moment it appeared, it has been fiercely loved by children and their parents for its honest, intelligent grappling with aging and death."

In 2012, Babbitt was awarded the inaugural E. B. White Award for achievement in children's literature by the American Academy of Arts and Letters.

== Personal life ==
Babbitt was married to Samuel Fisher Babbitt, and the couple had three children, born between 1956 and 1960.

== Bibliography ==
Picture books (‡) were written and illustrated by Babbitt unless noted up

=== As writer ===
- 1967 Dick Foote and the Shark ‡
- 1968 Phoebe's Revolt, self-illus. ‡
- 1969 The Search for Delicious, self-illus.
- 1970 Knee-Knock Rise, self-illus.
- 1970 The Something, self-illus. ‡
- 1971 Goody Hall, self-illus.
- 1974 The Devil's Storybook, self-illus.
- 1975 Tuck Everlasting
- 1977 The Eyes of the Amaryllis
- 1982 Herbert Rowbarge
- 1987 The Devil's Other Storybook, self-illus.
- 1989 Nellie: A Cat on Her Own, self-illus. ‡
- 1990 "Bus for Deadhorse", illus. Jon Agee, in Ann Durrell and Marilyn Sachs, eds., The Big Book for Peace (E. P. Dutton)
- 1994 Bub: Or the Very Best Thing ‡
- 1998 Ouch!: A Tale from Grimm, illus. Fred Marcellino ‡
- 2001 Elsie Times Eight ‡
- 2007 Jack Plank Tells Tales, self-illus.
- 2011 The Moon Over High Street
- 2012 The Devil's Storybooks – omnibus edition of The Devil's Storybook and The Devil's Other Storybook
- 2018 Barking with the Big Dogs: On Writing and Reading Books for Children

=== As illustrator ===
- 1966 Samuel Babbitt, The Forty-ninth Magician ‡
- 1972 Valerie Worth, Small Poems
- 1976 Valerie Worth, More Small Poems
- 1978 Valerie Worth, Still More Small Poems
- 1980 Valerie Worth, Curlicues: The Fortunes of Two Pug Dogs
- 1981 Valerie Worth, Imp and Biscuit: The Fortunes of Two Pugs
- 1986 Valerie Worth, Small Poems Again
- 1987 Valerie Worth, All the Small Poems
- 1994 Valerie Worth, All the Small Poems and Fourteen More
- 2002 Valerie Worth, Peacock and Other Poems
