= Browne Issue System =

The Browne Issue System is an old system for loaning library books, developed by Nina Browne in 1895.

== Overview ==
When a book was borrowed the librarian took one of the reader's "borrowing cards" and removed the book's own card. These two cards were filed together with the date stamped in the book. These cards are "tickets" that are arranged in trays by date of issue and within date by the key on the card.

When the book was returned, the user's card was removed from the file of the day indicated by the stamp and given back, and the book card was replaced in the book. Whilst the filed cards revealed which user had a particular book, or which books a particular reader had borrowed, this was only true whilst the loan continued. Afterwards no record of the transaction remained.

== Advantages ==
A reader can quickly see how many more books they can borrow (before handing any in) by the number of cards they have remaining. The librarian can look at the tray and instantly visualise the number of transactions that day.

The system is based upon cards and cardboard/paper slips: it is a low-technology approach yet proven over 100 years to be robust and scalable to work even in large libraries. Training can be completed in a small number of hours, and the cost of implementation is mostly centred on labour. Therefore, it is still a suitable solution for small loan libraries where financial resources are limited, or in locations where a computer based solution is not suitable (e.g. lack of equipment, guaranteed electrical supplies).

== Deficiencies ==
There is a lot of manual processing of the cards in the trays. Each day, the issues have to be ordered and added to the trays. When a book is returned, the identification 'key' and date of return guide the user to the card location in the trays.

When a book is reserved, somebody needs to check the catalog, and, if the book is not on the shelf, look for the relevant card in the trays. This involves manually looking for the card with the matching 'key' in the trays, sequentially looking in each date until found. A reserved item is flagged with a piece of colored card, so that when it is returned it can be set aside and checked against the file of reservations.

Renewals involve finding the ticket and moving it to its new location in the trays. Typically, a small number of 'queries' will mount up, cases where something goes awry because a card or ticket is misdirected in some way. These may consume quite a bit of time to sort out.

A tray of cards dropped on the floor could prove catastrophic and require a substantial amount of time to re-sort.

== Decline ==
The simple, reliable and speedy method was replaced in America by the Newark and Detroit methods and others based on them. The advent of technology within libraries, such as barcode scanners, eliminated card-based systems.

== Sources ==
- Prytherch, Ray J., Harrod's Librarians' Glossary: 9,000 terms used in information management, library science, publishing, the book trades, and archive management, 8th Edition, 1995. ISBN 978-0-566-07533-9
