= Mira Hinsdale Hall =

American school founder

Mira Hall (21 April 1863 – 25 August 1937) was the founder of the Miss Hall's School in Pittsfield, Massachusetts.

== Biography ==
=== Early life ===
Mira Hinsdale Hall was born to Charles and Elizabeth Wing Hinsdale Hall in Le Roy, New York, on the twenty-first of April 1863. Her father died when she was very young. She grew up in Le Roy and was educated at Le Roy Academy and Smith College, from which she graduated in 1883, the youngest member of her class. The family had by that time moved to Ware, Massachusetts, where Miss Hall taught Latin in the high school.

=== Miss Hall's School ===
In 1898 Miss Hall bought her school, one that had existed in the Pittsfield area since 1800. According to J. E. A. Smith's History of Pittsfield, “The first public institution for the higher education of young women was suggested by the successful efforts of Miss Nancy Hinsdale, in instituting a select female school about the year 1800.” Miss Hall's School is a direct descendant of that first school. At least twice during the early decades of the School's existence, it was known as the Pittsfield Young Ladies Seminary.

When Mira Hall purchased her school at the close of the 19th century, it was from Mary Salisbury, who had owned and led the school since 1871. Miss Hall's niece, Margaret Hall, would say years later that her aunt “was greatly interested in and desirous of having a school” and that she “began her venture with little capital beyond her youth, her determination to have the best school she could build, and the strong idealism which directed her.”

In February 1923, Miss Hall's determination was put to the test when a fire broke out in the gymnasium of the school and the building burned to the ground. Undaunted, the founder set about to rebuild. Her own resolve through that difficult period was greatly enhanced by the encouragement of many, most particularly Winthrop M. Crane, Jr., who would become the first board president of the newly incorporated school.

Miss Hall's talent, vision, and hard work served her well, and Miss Hall's School became a nationally recognized college-preparatory school for girls. In 1931 Fortune Magazine, reporting on the modern trend in feminine education in private schools, listed Miss Hall's among the nation's top ten schools. Miss Hall herself was recognized for her contributions to all-girl education when, in June 1933, upon the occasion of the fiftieth anniversary of her college graduation, Miss Hall was given the Honorary Degree of L.H.D. from Smith College. President William Allen Neilson conferred this degree with the following citation:

‘Mira Hinsdale Hall, B.A., of Smith College of the class of 1883, founder and principal of a great school, in which she has maintained the highest level of scholarly achievement, a notable builder of character, who has set before many generations of her students and ours an austere and lofty ideal, intolerant of softness and self-indulgence, demanding from all the best they have to give.’

=== Death ===
‘For nearly forty years her fine character and unique personality strongly influenced the lives and ideals of hundreds of girls who passed through her school (Miss Hall's School). Her humor and charm were the delight of all who knew her.’

Mira Hall led her school with distinction for forty years. Her vision that “a secondary school should seek to develop in every student the power to think independently and clearly, to discriminate between the gaudy and the real, and to be tolerant of others, while holding oneself to a high standard” (The Women’s Chronology) continues to underpin the mission. Mira Hinsdale Hall died on August 25, 1937, in York Harbor, Maine, while on a motor trip.
