= Annie Russell Marble =

American essayist (1864–1936)

- Born: August 10, 1864; Worcester, Massachusetts, U.S.
- Died: November 23, 1936 (aged 72); Worcester, Massachusetts, U.S.
- Occupations: Lecturer, essayist
- Writing career
- Movement: Transcendentalism

Annie Russell Marble (August 10, 1864 – November 23, 1936) was an American essayist, whose work dealt with early American historical figures, authors of the Transcendental movement, some of whom she knew personally, and commentary on literature in general.

== Biography ==
=== Early life, education, and family ===
Born Annie Maria Russell, she was the daughter of Isaiah Dunster Russell and Nancy Wentworth Russell. She graduated from Worcester High School in 1882. In 1886 she received her A.B. from Smith College and in 1895 her M.A. from the same institution.

In 1895 she married Charles Francis Marble of Worcester. Charles Marble was in a business named Curtis & Marble Machine Company, which produced machinery used in the textile industry. They had two children.

=== Early working life ===
In 1895 Marble became a trustee for the Home for Aged Women in Worcester, and also began an association with the Trade School for Girls in Worcester.

== Literary career ==
Marble's career in literature, history, and essays began in 1897 with publication of an edition of Thomas Carlyle’s On Heroes, Hero-Worship and the Heroic in History, which she edited, with notes and introduction.

This had been preceded by a couple of magazine articles, and in addition to the books noted below, she was also a prolific author of essays on early American History and Literature and published a number of calendars and almanacs with a literary theme. She was also literary editor and book reviewer for the Worcester Sunday Telegram (1920–29).

== Bibliography ==
- Books that Nourish Us (1900)
- Thoreau: His Home, Friends and Books (1902)
- Books in Their Seasons (1905)
- In Heralds of American Literature (1907) she wrote about early patriots and literary figures as, for example "Francis Hopkinson Jurist, Wit, and Dilettante", and Joseph Dennie.
- Pageant: Heroines of Literature (1915)
- The Women Who Came in the Mayflower (1920). Curiously, Marble was an opponent of women's suffrage.
- Women of the Bible, Their Services in Home and State (1923)
- The Nobel Prize Winners in History (1925)
- Study of the modern novel (1928)
- Pen Names and Personalities (1930)
- From Boston to Boston (1930)
- Builders and Books (1931)
- The Nobel Prize in Literature 1901–1931 (1932)
- From 'Prentice to Patron: The Life Story of Isaiah Thomas (1935)

== Legacy ==
Mrs. Marble has been quoted for her personal knowledge of some members of the Transcendentalist movement. Philip F. Gura at UNC noted that she had lived at the Ripley's Brook Farm community, and quoted her as saying that "Transcendentalists were 'a race who dove into the infinite, soared into the illimitable, and never paid cash." Gura, however, is mistaken; the Brook Farm community disbanded in 1847, nearly twenty years before Mrs. Marble was born.

Mrs. Marble has also been cited as an early critic of comic strips.

== Other ==
Mrs. Marble was in the American Association of University Women (AAUW) in Worcester, Massachusetts.

Mrs. Marble left a collection of 54 letters from noteworthy literary figures such as Willa Cather, Julia Ward Howe, and Jane Goodwin Austin.

== See also ==
- Transcendentalism
