= Kneeknock Rise =

First edition (publ. Farrar, Straus & Giroux)

Kneeknock Rise is a children's book written and illustrated by Natalie Babbitt and published in 1970. It was awarded the Newbery Honor in 1971. Egan, a young boy, travels to a mountain village to visit family and uncovers the truth about the supposed monster that lives atop Kneeknock Rise, a nearby mountain. Although the story is intended for children, some of the underlying themes deal with subjects such as the need for invented religion.

== Plot synopsis ==
The story is set in the small village of Instep. Egan, a young boy, has come to visit relatives and attend a fair. The village's people are terrified by the noises that come from the top of a small nearby mountain. No one has ever investigated the source of the sound, but the general rumor is that a thing called the "Megrimum" lives up there, kept at bay only through the use of various charms and offerings.

Teased by his cousin, Egan decides to make a trek up the mountain to investigate the source of the noises. When he discovers what's really up there, he has a hard decision to make about whether or not to inform the village.

At the top of the rise, Egan discovers that there is no Megrimum; the source of the sound is the steam from a boiling spring inside a cave that whistles, moans, and echoes through the rocky cavern when it rains. Egan tries to tell others that the mystery of the Megrimum can be explained, but they prefer to continue believing in a Megrimum.
