= Martha Smith Kimball =

American activist (1870–1967)

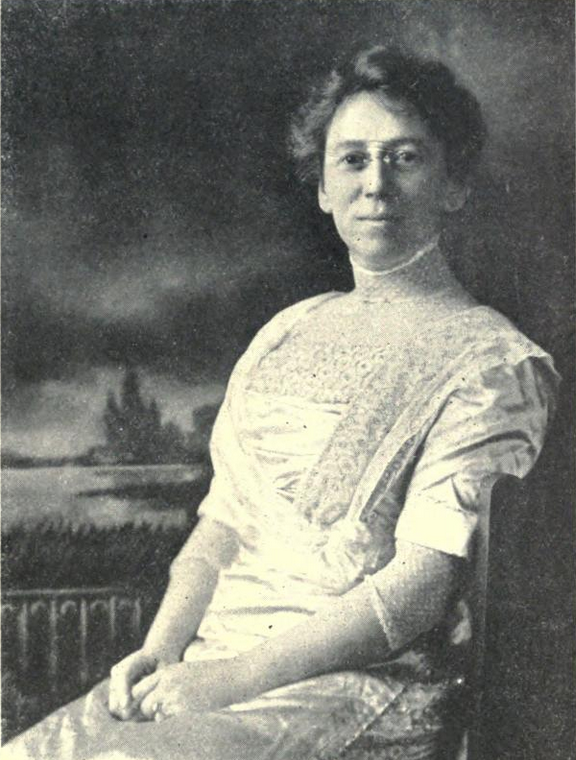
- Born: February 28, 1870; Portsmouth, New Hampshire, US
- Died: January 30, 1967 (aged 96); Fort Lauderdale, Florida, US
- Education: Smith College
- Occupation: Activist
- Known for: Contributions to the women's rights movement

Martha Smith Kimball (February 28, 1870 – January 30, 1967) was an American women's rights advocate during the 20th century.

== Biography ==
Martha Smith Kimball was born in Portsmouth, New Hampshire, on February 28, 1870, to a wealthy family. Her father, Edward Payson Kimball, was a banker. Her mother, Martha J. Thompson was descended from at least six significant leaders of the American Revolution.

Kimball grew up in Portsmouth and, after graduating from Smith College in 1892, returned to New Hampshire and promoted women's suffrage in the Portsmouth area for over three decades and held various positions in clubs and other organizations. She was elected president of the N.H. Equal Suffrage Association in 1913. She subsequently toured the United States as a speaker for suffrage, visiting New Jersey among other states. In July 1919, she was an organizer for the first women's School for Citizenship, held at New Hampshire College (now the University of New Hampshire), a week-long event designed to educate women from New Hampshire on basic aspects of government, voting, important political issues, and the platforms of the two political parties.

Kimball, among 29 other women, represented the United States at the International Woman Suffrage Alliance in Paris from May 30 to June 6, 1926. In 1944, she was the president of the League of Women Voters in Fort Lauderdale, Florida, although she returned to New Hampshire in 1945 following a farewell party given by the World Affairs Study group, as referenced in the Miami Herald that year.

She died in Fort Lauderdale on January 30, 1967, aged 96, and was buried in her family's plot in Harmony Grove Cemetery in Portsmouth.

== See also ==
- List of suffragists and suffragettes
