= Pearl London =

American poet

- Born: Pearl Levison; April 23, 1916; Dakar, Senegal
- Died: April 24, 2003 (aged 87); New York City, United States
- Education: Smith College (BA), New York University (MA)
- Occupations: Poetry teacher, literary arts advocate
- Known for: “Works in Progress” seminar, Poetry in Person
- Spouse: Ephraim London (m. 1939; d. 1991)
- Children: Peter London

Pearl London (1916–2003) was an American supporter of literary arts and teacher of poetry in New York City.

== Early life ==
Born Pearl Levison on April 23, 1916, London was the daughter of Joshua Jacob Levison and Ray Levison. Her father was a renowned landscape architect on Long Island and her mother was an emigrant from Latvia. London had two sisters, Sylvia and Beatrice.

London studied at the Dalton School in New York City. She then attended Bennington College in Vermont, the Art Students League of New York and finally Smith College in Northampton, Massachusetts, where she completed her undergraduate degree in 1937. For two years after college, she worked for George Gallup at the Gallup Poll, and began to write poetry.

In 1939, competing with a field of 6,175 entrants, Pearl London won the 1939 World’s Fair prize for poetry. The winning poem, titled “The World of Tomorrow,” was read on the radio by Orson Welles, with whom she was photographed. During this period, London posed for portrait photographer Arnold Genthe.

On June 8, 1939, London married Ephraim London. He would become a celebrated civil liberties lawyer, winning nine cases before the US Supreme Court, among them landmark censorship decisions. They were married for fifty-one years until his death in 1991. They had a son, Peter London, who was born in 1955.

The couple lived in Washington Mews, a Greenwich Village neighborhood just north of the Washington Square Arch. The London home became a literary salon, hosting artists such as the author Lillian Hellman, the author Shirley Hazzard, the writer Maureen Howard, the novelist Penelope Gilliatt, the poetry editor Alice Quinn, the journalist Nora Sayre, the literary critic Francis Steegmuller, and the film critic Vincent Canby.

In 1942, London’s modern verse translation of the Middle English poem “The Eaten Heart” appeared in Louis Untermeyer’s anthology A Treasury of Great Poems.

== Teaching career ==
In 1965, at age 49, London enrolled in a graduate program in comparative literature at New York University. She studied with preeminent Henry James scholar Leon Edel and with medievalist Robert Raymo and completed her degree in 1967. For the next three years, London taught English literature and writing courses at the Brooklyn campus of Long Island University. In 1970, she moved to the New School for Social Research in Manhattan, teaching poetry and her famous “Works in Progress” seminar. She would also serve on the board of The Poetry Society of America for most of the next decade.

Between 1970 and 1998, for “Works in Progress,” London asked poets to bring in drafts of poems and to discuss them in depth with the students, from vision to revision.

More than 100 poets accepted London's invitation. The attendees (many relatively unknown at the time) included several future Pulitzer Prize and Poet Laureate honorees: Stanley Kunitz, Maxine Kumin, Mark Strand, W.S. Merwin, Robert Hass, Robert Pinsky, Louise Glück, Charles Simic), James Merrill, Derek Walcott, Marilyn Hacker, Philip Levine, Frank Bidart, John Ashbery, Jorie Graham, Galway Kinnell, Stanley Plumly, Amy Clampitt, and C.K. Williams.

A book was published highlighting the “Works in Progress” course (Poetry in Person, edited by Alexander Neubauer. Alfred A. Knopf, March, 2010).

== Death ==
Pearl London died on April 24, 2003, the day after her eighty-seventh birthday.

== Sources ==
- Interview with Pearl London’s son, Peter London, on 11/29/2009
- Interview with poet Philip Levine, 3/25/2008
- Introduction by Alexander Neubauer, in Poetry in Person: 25 Years of Conversation with America’s Poets, Knopf, 2010
- Postscript by Robert Polito, in Poetry in Person, 2010
