= Caroline Thomas Rumbold =

American botanist (1877–1949)

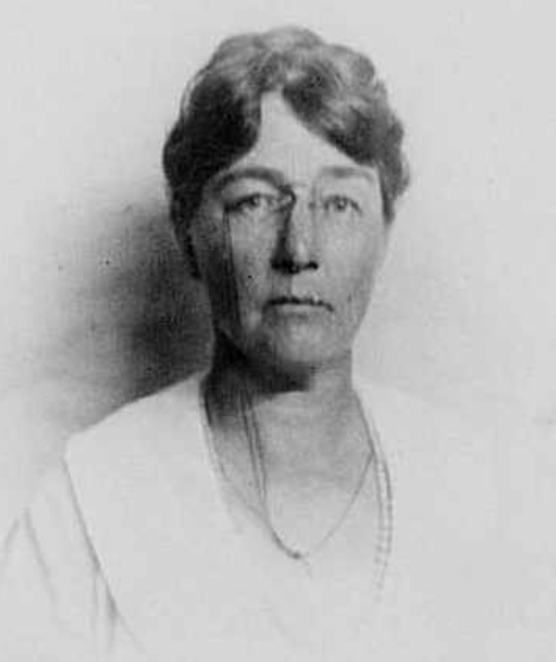
Caroline Thomas Rumbold

Caroline Thomas Rumbold (July 22, 1877 – November 7, 1949) was an American botanist. She specialized in forest pathology. Her researches focused on “fungus diseases of trees and blue stain fungi of wood.”

== Biography ==
Born on July 22, 1877, in St. Louis, Missouri, United States, Caroline Thomas Rumbold was the daughter of Thomas Frasier Rumbold and Charlotte E. Ledengerber. In 1901 she graduated from Smith College in Massachusetts. During her time there, she published a short story in volume 8 of the Smith College Monthly, titled In the Time of Otto the Second. She got both the master's degree and the doctorate from the Washington University in St. Louis.

She started her career as an assistant at the Bureau of Plant Industry, United States Department of Agriculture in 1903. She later moved to University of Missouri to become an assistant in botany. From 1929 to 1942 she had a long career as an associate pathologist at the Department of Plant Pathology in the University of Wisconsin–Madison. She briefly worked as a fellow at the Missouri Botanical Garden.

She was associated with a number of professional institutions including Phytopathological Society, the American Society of Plant Physiologists and the Botanical Society of Washington.

She died on November 7, 1949, in Cleveland, Ohio, United States.
