= Frances Carpenter =

American folklorist, author, and photographer

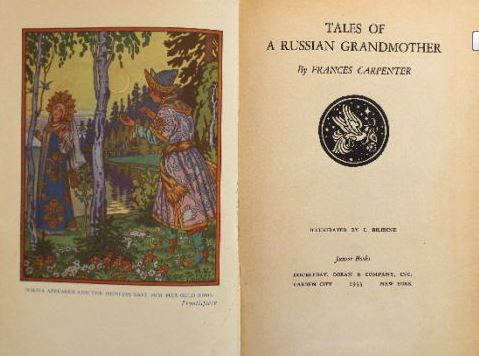
- frontispiece, Tales of a Russian Grandmother.
- Born: Frances Aretta Carpenter; April 30, 1890; Washington, D.C., U.S.
- Died: November 2, 1972 (aged 82)
- Resting place: Oak Hill Cemetery, Washington, D.C., U.S.
- Other names: Frances Carpenter Huntington
- Occupations: Folklorist, Author, Photographer
- Known for: Extensive collection of folklore material; Ethnographic Photography; Children's books; illustrating her father's works on travel and world geography
- Board member of: Board of Trustees, Smith College; Vice President, International Society of Woman Geographers; member of the Sulgrave Club, the Cosmos Club, the Chevy Chase Club and the Cosmopolitan Club
- Spouse: William Chapin Huntington
- Children: Joanna Huntington Noel and Edith Chapin Huntington Williams
- Parent(s): Frank G. Carpenter, Joanna Condict.

Frances Aretta Carpenter (April 30, 1890 – November 2, 1972) was an American folklorist, author, and photographer. She traveled to, and published collections of folk stories from, nations on five continents.

== Early life and education ==
Frances Aretta Carpenter was born in Washington, D.C., in 1890. Her mother was Joanna Condict. Her father was noted traveller and travel-writer Frank G. Carpenter, and her brother John Carpenter. Unusually for the times, her father took her traveling with him internationally as his secretary and photographic assistant from her early teenage years, with a break to complete her college education starting in 1908.

In 1912 she graduated from Smith College, and returned to work as her father's assistant.

== Photography, writing, and a life of world travel ==
From an early age, she photographed ethnographically diverse subjects for her father's books. The pair traveled extensively on four continents, with Frances remaining in active partnership with Frank Carpenter until his death in 1924.

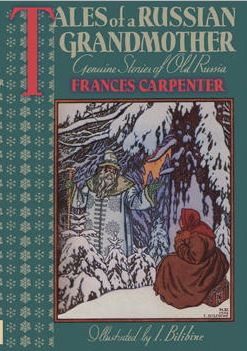

In 1930, Carpenter published Tales of a Basque Grandmother, her first collection of folktales. This would also be the first of her popular Grandmother series, where she used the device of a central organizing narrator to convey details of national culture as well as its folk legends. Her breakthrough as a popular writer would come three years later with the publication of Tales of a Russian Grandmother, (1933) "genuine" stories, translated from original Russian sources, and printed with the now classic illustrations by Ivan Bilibin.

In the early 1960s, Carpenter traveled to Canada and the Mediterranean. In 1964 she visited Africa and traveled throughout the continent by car. In 1966 she was in Japan and Korea. Her last major folklore collection, People from the Sky; Ainu Tales from Northern Japan, which detailed the vanishing culture of the repressed Ainu people of North Japan, was published in 1972.

In addition to her own work, her projects included the ongoing work of organizing her father's corpus, arranging for a mass donation of the family papers and photographs to the Library of Congress and publishing excerpts from her father's written work. Carp's Washington, a selection of her father's "early" Washington columns (written in the 1880s) was published in 1960, and became a best seller.

Carpenter was a fellow for the Royal Geographical Society. She also served as vice president of the International Society of Woman Geographers from 1939 until 1942. A member of the Sulgrave Club, the Cosmos Club, the Chevy Chase Club and the Cosmopolitan Club, Carpenter was president of the Smith College Alumnae Association, sat on their Board of Trustees from 1936 until 1944, and from 1960 until 1930 served on the college's Board of Counselors. S

== Personal life ==
On April 6, 1920, Carpenter married William Chapin Huntington, a career diplomat with whom she continued to travel all over the world. He worked at the Embassy of the United States, Paris and the United States Foreign Service from 1920 until 1961. The couple had two children: Joanna Huntington Noel and Edith Chapin Huntington Williams. Although, as was traditional at the time of her marriage, Ms. Carpenter took her husband's surname, she continued to publish under her birthname.

== Death and legacy ==
Frances Carpenter died on November 2, 1972.

Carpenter is interred at Oak Hill Cemetery, Washington, D.C. The Frances Carpenter Papers are held in the collection of the Sophia Smith Collection at Smith College. The Library of Congress has a collection of approximately 7,000 negatives and 16,800 photographs taken by the Carpenters which document the ethnographic work begun by her father and continued through Carpenter's own career.

== Works ==
=== With Frank G. Carpenter ===
- Carpenter, Frank, & Carpenter, Frances. The Food We Eat: Journey Club Travels. New York: American Book Co., 1925.
- Carpenter, Frank, & Carpenter, Frances. The Clothes We Wear: Journey Club Travels. New York: American Book Co., 1926.
- Carpenter, Frank, & Carpenter, Frances. The Houses We Live In: Journey Club Travels. New York: American Book Co., 1928.

=== As Frances Carpenter ===
- The Ways We Travel (1929)

==== Grandmother Tales collections ====
- Tales of a Basque Grandmother, ill. Pedro Garmendia. New York: Junior Literary guild/Lippincott, 1930.
- Tales of a Russian Grandmother. NY: Doubleday, Doran & Co. Inc, 1933.
- Tales of a Chinese Grandmother, ill. Malthe Hasselriis. NY: Doubleday, Doran & Co. Inc, 1937.
- Tales of a Swiss Grandmother, ill. E. Bieler. Doubleday, Doran & Co. Inc, New York, 1940.
- Tales of a Korean Grandmother: 32 Traditional Tales from Korea. New York: Doubleday, Doran & Co. Inc, 1947.

==== International folklore anthologies ====
- Wonder Tales of Horses & Heroes, ill. William D. Hayes. Garden City: New York: Doubleday & Co., Inc., 1952.
- Wonder Tales of Dogs and Cats, ill. Ezra Jack Keats. Garden City: New York: Doubleday & Co., Inc., 1955.
- Wonder Tales of Seas & Ships, ill. Peter Spier. Garden City, NY: Doubleday, 1959.
- The Elephant’s Bathtub: Wonder Tales From The Far East. ill. Hans Guggenheim. Garden City: New York: Doubleday & Co. Inc., 1962.
- African Wonder Tales. ill. Joseph Escourido. Garden City, NY: Doubleday, 1963.
- The Mouse Palace. ill. Adrienne Adams. McGraw-Hill Book Co. 1964.
- South American Wonder Tales. ill. Ralph Creasman. Chicago: Follett Publishing (1969). ISBN 0695482149
- People from the Sky; Ainu Tales from Northern Japan. ill. Betty Fraser. Garden City, NY: Doubleday, 1972.

==== Additional ethnographic works ====
- Ourselves & Our City: Journey Club Travels. New York: American Book Co., 1928.
- The Ways We Travel: Journey Club Travels. New York: American Book Co., 1929.
- Children of Our World (1929)
- Our Little Friends of Eskimo Land: Papik & Natsek, ill. Curtiss Sprague. New York: American Book Co., 1931.
- Our Neighbors Near and Far (1933)
- Our Little Friends of the Arabian Desert: Adi & Hamda, ill. Curtiss Sprague. New York: American Book Co., 1934.
- Our Little Friends of the Netherlands: Dirk & Dientje. New York: American Book Co., 1935.
- Our Little Friends of Norway: Ola & Marit. New York: American Book Co., 1936.
- Our Little Friends of China: Ah Hu and Ying Hwa, ill. Curtiss Sprague. New York: American Book Co., 1937.
- Our Little Neighbors at Work & Play: Here, There, Then & Now. New York: American Book Co., 1939.
- Our Little Friends of Switzerland: Hansli & Heidi, ill. Curtiss Sprague. New York: American Book Co., 1941.
- Our South American Neighbors. New York: American Book Co., 1942.
- The Pacific: Its Lands & Peoples. New York: American Book Co., 1944.
- Our Neighbors Near & Far. New York: American Book Co., 1946.
- Canada & Her Northern Neighbors, New York: American Book Co., 1946.
- Children of Our World. New York: American Book Co., 1949.
- Caribbean Lands: Mexico, Central America, & the West Indies. New York: American Book Co., 1950.
- Children of Our World. New York: American Book Co., 1956.
- Our Homes & Our Neighbors. New York: American Book Co., 1956.
- Pocahontas & Her World, ill. Langdon Hihn. New York: Alfred A. Knopf. 1957.
- Carpenter, Frances, in Best in Children's Books, Volume 24. Nelson Doubleday, 1959.
- The Story of East Africa. Wichita, Kan.: McCormick-Mathers Pub. Co., 1967.
- The Story of Korea. Cincinnati: McCormick-Mathers Pub. Co., 1969.
- Spooks and Scoundrels. SRA Pilot Library IIb Book 14. 1976.

==== Memoir ====
- ed. Frances Carpenter. Carp's Washington. New York: McGraw-Hill Book Company, 1960.
- Carpenter, Frances. Holiday in Washington. ill. George Fulton. New York: Alfred A. Knopf. 1966.

==== Reprints ====
- Carpenter, Frances. Tales of a Korean Grandmother: 32 Traditional Tales from Korea. Clarendon: Tuttle Publishing (1989). ISBN 0804810435
- Carpenter, Frances. Tales of a Chinese Grandmother: 30 Traditional Tales from China. Clarendon: Tuttle Publishing (2001). ISBN 0804834091
