= Eunice Blake Bohanon =

American editor (1904–1997)

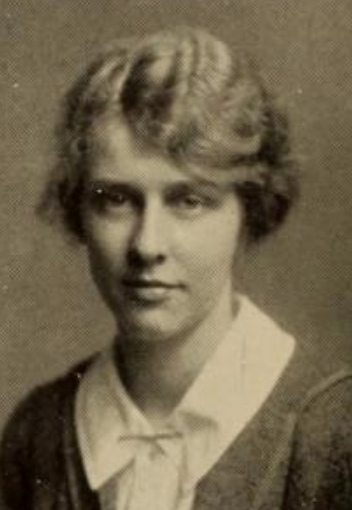
- Eunice Blake Bohanon, from the 1925 yearbook of Smith College
- Born: Eunice Putnam Blake; April 19, 1904; New Haven, Connecticut
- Died: February 16, 1997 (aged 92)
- Occupations: Children's book editor, consultant
- Relatives: James Luce Kingsley (great-grandfather)

Eunice Putnam Blake Bohanon (April 19, 1904 – February 16, 1997) was an American children's book editor and vice-president of J. B. Lippincott & Co. and president of the Children's Book Council.

== Early life and education ==
Eunice Putnam Blake was born in New Haven, Connecticut, the daughter of James Kingsley Blake and Helen Langley Putnam Blake. Her father, a lawyer, died in 1911, when she and her sister were young. She was descended from prominent old New England families; two of her great-grandfathers were inventor Eli Whitney Blake and classical scholar James Luce Kingsley. She graduated from Smith College in 1925.

== Career ==
Bohanon was an editor and vice-president at J. B. Lippincott & Co. and president of the Children's Book Council. She held a Fulbright Scholarship in 1964 for study in India. In the 1960s, she was a representative of the Franklin Book Programs, a project of the USAID; with the Franklin program, she promoted children's literature and literacy in travels through India, Pakistan, the Philippines, Italy, Israel, and through several African countries in the 1960s. She was a member of the Weekly Reader Children's Book Club selection board in 1969 and 1971, and a judge for the Sarah Josepha Hale Awards in the 1970s.

Bohanon co-wrote Portrait of Jesus: Paintings and Engravings from the National Gallery of Art (1956) with Marian King; the book was published in separate Catholic and Protestant editions. She also wrote an introduction to a 1980 edition of Azor and the Blue-Eyed Cow by Maude Crowley.

Bohanon donated an easement on her land in New Hampshire to the Ausbon Sargent Land Preservation Trust, to protect the public view of Lake Sunapee. She also collected Indian art, and donated art to the Currier Museum of Art. She gave an oral history interview to New London History & Archives.

== Personal life ==
Eunice Blake married architect and children's book author Paul I. Bohanon in 1939. He died in 1954. She died in 1997, aged 92 years. The University of Oregon Libraries hold a collection of her papers.
