= Parkinson Association of the Rockies =

US not-for-profit organization

- Founded: 1981
- Type: NPO
- Location: Colorado
- Services: Education, research, awareness, support
- Staff: Jodi Brown, Cari Friedman, Seth Dean, Elena Cussler, Eli Edwards, Michael Barber, Joanna Aguirre
- Website: www.parkinsonrockies.org

The Parkinson Association of the Rockies (PAR) is a Colorado care and research not-for-profit organization whose aim is to enhance the quality of life for individuals with Parkinson's disease through education, research, awareness and support for those with Parkinson's disease, their families and the community.

== History ==
The organization was formed in 1981 as a support group for People with Parkinson's in the local Colorado Community, and has since grown in numbers and scope to include a staff of 7 people and vast community of People with Parkinson's and Care Partners around Colorado. The current board president is Dan Starishevsky, the Senior VP of Marketing at Jackson National Life. In recent years, PAR has partnered with a number of associated businesses and organizations to build a realistic and progressive future for the group, such organizations include Supernus, Kyowa Hakko Kirin, Teva Pharmaceutical Industries, Brownstein Hyatt Farber Schreck, Medtronic and Touching Hearts at Home among others.

== Mission ==
The Parkinson Association of the Rockies connects and empowers People with Parkinson’s to thrive through educating, creating awareness, promoting research and supporting those with the disease, their families and the Colorado community.

== Vision ==
To provide the care that counts on the way to a cure for the Colorado Parkinson’s community.

== Support groups ==
PAR's support group network aims to lift the burden of coping with Parkinson's disease by teaching patients and caregivers how to help themselves while helping each other. As of January 2021, PAR promote 52 groups throughout Colorado, Wyoming and western Nebraska.

- See also the promoted by PAR

== Exercise Classes ==
As of January 2021, PAR hosts 63 Weekly Exercise Classes. For a full list of offered classes visit: Classes include Power Punch Parkinson's, Yoga, Step and Connect, Dance, Circuit Training and more.

== Signature Events ==
The Parkinson Association of the Rockies hosts 4 Annual Signature Events and a variety of third party fundraisers. PAR's signature events include:

Vitality Walk - a 5k Run & Walk

Play Fore PAR - a golf tournament

e3 - an educational conference focusing to Educate, Empower and Energize the Parkinson's Community

Empowerment Ball - a formal gala with live auction

== See also ==
- Parkinson's disease
- Unified Parkinson's Disease Rating Scale
