= Catriona Chandler =

British actress (born 2002)

- Chandler in 2026
- Born: Catriona Mary Chandler; 10 January 2002 (age 24)
- Education: Tring Park School for the Performing Arts
- Years active: 2020–present

Catriona Mary Chandler (born 10 January 2002) is a British actress. On television, she is best known for her role in the Disney+ series Rivals (2024-present). She also appeared in the BBC series Wild Cherry (2025).

== Early life ==
Chandler grew up in Hertfordshire and Liverpool. Chandler attended Tring Park School for the Performing Arts.

== Career ==
In 2022, Chandler made her television debut in the Danny Boyle directed Disney+ musical biographical series Pistol and her feature film debut in the Netflix sequel Enola Holmes 2.

Chandler had her first major television role in the Disney+ adaptation of Rivals Caitlin O'Hara, daughter of Declan (Aidan Turner) and sister of Taggie (Bella Maclean). That year, she also played Sky Morgan in Malta-set British mystery drama series The Wives for Channel 5. The following year, she had a supporting role as Iris Milanovic in BBC mother-daughter drama series Wild Cherry.

In 2026, Chandler was cast in the title role of Louise Woodward in The Trial of Louise Woodward for HBO.

== Filmography ==
Key
| † | Denotes works that have not yet been released |

| Year | Title | Role | Notes |
|---|---|---|---|
| 2022 | Pistol | Jeannie | 2 episodes |
| 2022 | Enola Holmes 2 | Agatha Gowerdale | |
| 2024 | The Wives | Sky Morgan | 6 episodes |
| 2024–present | Rivals | Caitlin O'Hara | 11 episodes |
| 2025 | Wild Cherry | Iris Milanovic | 6 episodes |
| 2027 | The Trial of Louise Woodward † | Louise Woodward | 5 episodes |
