= Wild Cattle =

Wild Cattle may refer to:

- Feral populations of cattle (Bos taurus); see Cattle#Feral cattle
- Certain species of the tribe Bovini
  - Aurochs, the extinct wild ancestors of domesticated cattle
- Wild Cattle (film), 1934 film

== See also ==
- Cattle (disambiguation)
