= Rivals (TV series) =

British television series

- Genre: Black comedy; Period drama
- Based on: Rutshire Chronicles by Jilly Cooper
- Starring: Alex Hassell; Nafessa Williams; Emily Atack; Catriona Chandler; Oliver Chris; Danny Dyer; Rufus Jones; Bella Maclean; Lisa McGrillis; Katherine Parkinson; Luke Pasqualino; Claire Rushbrook; Annabel Scholey; Victoria Smurfit; Aidan Turner; David Tennant; Gary Lamont; Hubert Burton; Gabriel Tierney; Hayley Atwell; Rupert Everett; Jonny Weldon; Bryony Hannah; Louis Landau; Dan Tetsell; Selina Griffiths; Rachael Stirling; Eliot Salt; Maxim Ays; Holly Cattle; Amanda Lawrence; Bobby Lockwood
- Composers: Jack Halama; Natalie Holt
- Country of origin: United Kingdom
- Original language: English
- No. of series: 2
- No. of episodes: 17

Production
- Executive producers: Jilly Cooper; Dominic Treadwell-Collins; Felicity Blunt; Alexander Lamb; Lee Mason; Elliot Hegarty; Laura Wade
- Producer: Eliza Mellor
- Cinematography: John Lynch; Carlos Catalán; Mark Nutkins
- Editors: Oliver Parker; Matthew Gray; Adam Moss; Vicky Tooms
- Running time: 48–62 minutes
- Production company: Happy Prince

Original release
- Network: Disney+
- Release: 18 October 2024 – present

Rivals is a British period comedy-drama television series based on the Rutshire Chronicles novel series by Jilly Cooper. It stars an ensemble cast including David Tennant, Aidan Turner, Katherine Parkinson, Victoria Smurfit, Alex Hassell, Nafessa Williams, Bella Maclean, Emily Atack, Lisa McGrillis and Danny Dyer. The first series was released on 18 October 2024 on Disney+. The first six episodes of the second series were released in May and June 2026. The last six episodes of the second series are set to release in November and December 2026. In June 2026, it was renewed for a third series.

== Synopsis ==
In the first series, set in 1986, the rivalry between British aristocrat and Member of Parliament Rupert Campbell-Black and nouveau riche Tony, Lord Baddingham, seeps into the (fictional) county of Rutshire, in the Cotswolds region of south-west England. Tony brings American producer Cameron Cook to help strengthen Corinium's programming, and hires dynamic Irish newsman Declan O'Hara, husband of actress Maud, away from the BBC. After falling out with Tony, Declan begins his own company, Venturer, with Rupert and tech tycoon Freddie Jones.

The second series is set in 1987, at the time of the general election and the Great Storm, and follows Cameron joining Venturer with Declan and Rupert, with Tony seeking revenge on all three.

== Cast and characters ==
=== Main ===
- Alex Hassell as Rupert Campbell-Black, a retired Olympian show jumper, notorious womaniser, and a Tory MP and sports minister. Despite his outward charm and facility with people, he lives a lonely life with his many dogs. Rupert joins Venturer with Declan and Freddie and develops feelings for Agatha (Taggie). In series 2, he retires as an MP and minister, and is in a relationship with Cameron, further complicating his feelings for Taggie.
- Nafessa Williams as Cameron Cook, an American TV producer from New York who works for Corinium and has an affair with Tony during series 1. In series 2, she is in a relationship with Rupert.
- Emily Atack as Sarah Stratton, the second wife and former mistress of Conservative MP Paul Stratton, with aspirations of being a television presenter.
- Catriona Chandler as Caitlin O'Hara, Declan and Maud's youngest child who is attending boarding school.
- Oliver Chris as James Vereker, a TV host and actor at Corinium and Lizzie's self-absorbed husband.
- Danny Dyer as Freddie Jones, a self-made successful electronics businessman and resident in Rutshire in a loveless marriage. He is attracted to Lizzie.
- Rufus Jones as Paul Stratton, a Conservative MP going through a mid-life crisis who is embroiled in an adultery scandal at the beginning of the series.
- Bella Maclean as Agatha "Taggie" O'Hara, Declan and Maud's overlooked middle child with aspirations of opening her own catering company. She has several poor first impressions of Rupert, but gradually develops a crush on him as they spend more time together.
- Lisa McGrillis as Valerie Jones, Freddie's wife, a notorious social climber who runs a clothing boutique in town. She is often mocked for her bourgeois lack of taste.
- Katherine Parkinson as Lizzie Vereker, a romance author and resident of Rutshire who is good friends with Rupert. She is neglected by her narcissistic husband and is used to his affairs and lack of attention. She gradually develops a romantic connection with Freddie.
- Luke Pasqualino as Basil "Bas" Baddingham, Tony's younger and promiscuous half-brother who owns the local pub.
- Claire Rushbrook as Monica, Lady Baddingham, Tony's wife, an introvert generally uninvested in her husband's business.
- Annabel Scholey as Beattie Johnson, a journalist who is in a relationship with Rupert at the beginning of the series.
- Victoria Smurfit as Maud O'Hara, Declan's wife, an actress whose marriage is recovering from an affair she had prior to the series, and is known to be flirtatious with other men. She is neglected by her workaholic husband. Tony hires her in series 2.
- Aidan Turner as Declan O'Hara, a temperamental Irish former BBC journalist who is recruited by Corinium to host his own show at the beginning of the series. After seeing Tony's true colours, he leaves Corinium to start his own company, Venturer. He initially has a hostile relationship with Rupert, but the two gradually become friends and trusted colleagues.
- David Tennant as Tony, Lord Baddingham, the ruthless managing director of Corinium Television. He has an affair with Cameron during series 1. He attempts to instrumentalize Declan in his war against Rupert.
- Gary Lamont as Charles Fairburn (series 2, supporting series 1), the controller of programmes at Corinium who has a secret romance with Gerald.
- Hubert Burton as Gerald Middleton (series 2, supporting series 1), (Note: First credited in the main cast in series 2, episode 2) Rupert's personal aide. In series 2, he takes Rupert's former seat as a Conservative MP.
- Gabriel Tierney as Patrick O'Hara (series 2, supporting series 1), Declan and Maud's eldest child who harbours feelings for Cameron. He is a young idealist.
- Anastasia Griffith (series 1, supporting) and Hayley Atwell (series 2) as Helen Gordon, Rupert's ex-wife and mother of his two children.
- Rupert Everett as Malise Gordon (series 2), Helen's husband and Rupert's former showjumping coach.
- Jonny Weldon as Mike Maples (series 2) (Note: Credited as supporting cast in episodes 1–4 of series 2)
- Bryony Hannah as Deirdre Kilpatrick (series 2, supporting series 1), (Note: First credited in the main cast in series 2, episode 6) an assistant to James Vereker at Corinium.
- Louis Landau as Archie Baddingham (series 2, supporting series 1), Tony and Monica's teenage son.
- Dan Tetsell as Steve Meadows (series 2, supporting series 1)
- Selina Griffiths as Dame Enid Spink (series 2, supporting series 1), (Note: First credited in the main cast in series 2, episode 7) a classical musician.
- Rachael Stirling as Araminta Pemberton (series 2)
- Eliot Salt as Caroline "Muffy" Hampshire (series 2), (Note: Credited as supporting cast in episodes 1–7 of series 2) Henry and Hermione's daughter.
- Maxim Ays as Sebbie Carlisle (series 2), (Note: Credited as supporting cast in episodes 1–8 of series 2) the polo-playing twin brother of Dommie.
- Holly Cattle as Perdita Macleod (series 2), (Note: Credited as supporting cast in episodes 1–5 of series 2) Rupert's illegitimate daughter.
- Amanda Lawrence as Sally Menzies-Scott (series 2) (Note: Credited as supporting cast in episodes 3–8 of series 2)
- Bobby Lockwood as Dommie Carlisle (series 2), the polo-playing twin brother of Sebbie.

=== Supporting ===
- Rich Keeble as Brian Hetherington, a director at Corinium.
- Milo Callaghan as Seb Burrows (series 1), a journalist at Corinium. He offers to be a spy for Venturer and is fired by Tony as a result. In series 1 he dates Taggie.
- Lara Peake as Daysee Butler, a production assistant at Corinium.
- Denise Black as Joyce Madden, Tony's assistant.
- Antony Byrne as Ginger Baines, Tony's unscrupulous enforcer.
- David Calder as Reverend Fergus Penney, Lady Gosling's right-hand man.
- Brendan Patricks as Henry Hampshire, a member of the local Rutshire aristocracy.
- Olivia Poulet as Hermione Hampshire, wife of Henry.
- Guy Siner as Bishop Hubert Brenton, a clergyman.
- Gilbert Kyem Jnr as Wesley Emerson, a cricketer and minor sports celebrity.
- Wendy Albiston as Mrs Makepiece, a housekeeper and help hired by multiple residents of Rutshire.
- Emma Shipp and Jamie Bisping as Shelley and Kevin Makepiece, Mrs Makepiece's children
- Georgia Mack and Ryan Baker as Sharon and Wayne Jones, Freddie and Valerie's children
- Maggie Steed as Lady Gosling, the steely no-nonsense chair of the Independent Broadcasting Authority (IBA).
- Nino Furuhata as Toshi Yamazaki, a "millionaire whiz kid"
- Oliver Dench as Hugo K Bruce (series 2)
- Nimmi Harasgama as Chandra Roy (series 2)
- Amelie Child Villiers and Olive Tennant as Beatrice and Camilla Baddingham (series 2), Tony's daughters
- Charlotte Rice-Foley and Leo Weston as Tabitha and Marcus Campbell-Black (series 2), Rupert's children

== Series overview ==
| Series | Episodes | | Originally released | |
| Series | Episodes | | First released | Last released |
|---|---|---|---|---|
| 1 | 8 | | 18 October 2024 | |
| 2 | 12 | 6 | 15 May 2026 | 5 June 2026 |
| 2 | 12 | 6 | 11 November 2026 | 2 December 2026 |

== Episodes ==
=== Series 1 (2024) ===
The first series is based on Rivals (1988).

| No. overall | No. in series | Title | Directed by | Written by | Original release date |
|---|---|---|---|---|---|
| 1 | 1 | "Episode 1" | Elliot Hegarty | Dominic Treadwell-Collins | 18 October 2024 |
To bolster his television company, Corinium, Tony, Lord Baddingham recruits renowned journalist Declan O'Hara and ambitious American producer Cameron Cook. As Declan and his family relocate to the countryside, he faces unexpected challenges on his inaugural day at Corinium.
| 2 | 2 | "Episode 2" | Elliot Hegarty | Laura Wade | 18 October 2024 |
Under pressure to deliver a successful new show, Declan collaborates with Cameron, despite their differing approaches. Tony, aiming to secure businessman Freddie Jones for Corinium's board, attends a dinner party where unexpected guests lead to unforeseen complications.
| 3 | 3 | "Episode 3" | Elliot Hegarty | Sophie Goodhart | 18 October 2024 |
During the festive season, Declan is concerned about his wife Maud's extravagant plans for their son's upcoming 21st birthday celebration. Meanwhile, Taggie O'Hara seeks to reconnect with a past love, orchestrating what she hopes will be a memorable evening.
| 4 | 4 | "Episode 4" | Elliot Hegarty | Marek Horn | 18 October 2024 |
Preparing for a live television interview, Declan aims to challenge Rupert Campbell-Black. Tony invites Freddie to an exclusive pheasant shoot, hoping to persuade him to join Corinium's board. Encouraged by Rupert, Taggie begins to assert her independence.
| 5 | 5 | "Episode 5" | Dee Koppang O'Leary | Clare Naylor & Mimi Hare | 18 October 2024 |
Corinium Studios is abuzz as preparations are underway for its inaugural beauty pageant and an exclusive interview with Prime Minister Margaret Thatcher. Declan's confidence grows with each successful broadcast, yet he remains driven by a desire for journalistic excellence. Daysee, a studio worker, is raped by an important investor, Reverend Penney. Tony tells her to forget the incident to protect the studio.
| 6 | 6 | "Episode 6" | Alexandra Brodski | Dare Aiyegbayo | 18 October 2024 |
Attending an awards ceremony in Spain solo, Cameron unexpectedly encounters Rupert at the same venue. Rupert takes a strategic risk to support Venturer, a new company poised to challenge Tony's Corinium.
| 7 | 7 | "Episode 7" | Dee Koppang O'Leary | Kefi Chadwick | 18 October 2024 |
Upon discovering that Rupert, Declan, and Freddie have established Venturer to compete against his bid for the television franchise, Tony is incensed. However, morale at Corinium lifts when the company receives a prestigious award nomination. Taggie offers her assistance in campaigning for Venturer.
| 8 | 8 | "Episode 8" | Alexandra Brodski | Laura Wade | 18 October 2024 |
A paranoid Tony demands unwavering loyalty from his team. As Corinium and Venturer gear up for a pivotal public meeting to determine the franchise's future, both sides employ every tactic to win over the local community.

=== Series 2 (2026) ===
| No. overall | No. in series | Title | Directed by | Written by | Original release date |
|---|---|---|---|---|---|
Part 1
| 9 | 1 | "Episode 1" | Elliot Hegarty | Dominic Treadwell-Collins | 15 May 2026 |
Following the events of the previous season, Rupert shelters Cameron whilst Tony, having survived his injury, seeks justice. A polo match takes place with both Corinium and Venturer filming for broadcast. Despite pressure from Tony, Cameron sides with Rupert. Tony promises revenge.
| 10 | 2 | "Episode 2" | Elliot Hegarty | Laura Wade | 15 May 2026 |
The General Election of 1987 looms. Taggie grows closer to Rupert’s children. Sarah debates what to do next, torn between Paul and Tony. On election evening, Corinium go live with a surprise exposé on one person: Rupert Campbell-Black.
| 11 | 3 | "Episode 3" | Elliot Hegarty | Dominic Treadwell-Collins & Laura Wade | 15 May 2026 |
The Venturer board, including Declan, Freddie, and Cameron, reel from the shocking revelations of Corinium’s exposé about Rupert. Maud is approached by Tony with a proposal to star in one of his plays. Freddie and Lizzie wrestle with their feelings. Rupert wins his seat comfortably, but is summoned to 10 Downing Street.
| 12 | 4 | "Episode 4" | Jamie Jay Johnson | Sophie Goodhart | 22 May 2026 |
Corinium stage their latest production with Maud in a lead role. Declan is moved by her performance, but knows Tony has ulterior motives, which causes fractures. Freddie and Lizzie are almost caught. The fallout from the election continues.
| 13 | 5 | "Episode 5" | Jamie Jay Johnson | Sam Hoare | 29 May 2026 |
Declan and Cameron film their latest production for Venturer. Maud and Tony continue an affair, while Declan and Cameron appear to be getting especially close with each other. Rupert attempts to gain favour by staging a one off entertainment special for Venturer. The recording is a triumph, but Tony has the tapes of the show stolen.
| 14 | 6 | "Episode 6" | Jamie Jay Johnson | Laura Wade | 5 June 2026 |
Archie and Caitlin leave school early, and have sex at Archie's home. Monica returns home early, and Archie hides Caitlin in his darkroom, where he has been developing film. Caitlin discovers that included in the pictures are ones that Tony took with Maud in extremely compromising positions. An upset Archie and Caitlin are found by Monica, who sees the pictures, and throws them in the fireplace. Later that evening, an especially blustery storm takes place. During dinner, Archie confronts Tony about his affair with Maud. Monica leaves their home and wanders to Lizzie's home, where the two discuss whether or not to stay with cheating husbands. Monica returns home and tells Tony she will be divorcing him. Meanwhile, Taggie returns Rupert's horse to his home. Rupert drives her back to her house. Monica tells Caitlin to get in the car and she will drive her back home. After she leaves, Tony calls Maud and tells her that Caitlin and Monica know about their affair. Monica doesn't return Caitlin after quite some time, so Declan and Rupert go out to find her. As they are looking for them, a bloody Caitlin is found walking down the road, and Declan returns her home. In the morning, Rupert visits Tony, and tells him that Monica died last night when a tree fell on her car. Tony is stricken.
Part 2
| 15 | 7 | "Episode 7" | Dee Koppang O'Leary | Dominic Treadwell-Collins & Laura Wade | 11 November 2026 |
| 16 | 8 | "Episode 8" | Dee Koppang O'Leary | Claire Naylor & Mimi Hare | 11 November 2026 |
| 17 | 9 | "Episode 9" | Dee Koppang O'Leary | Sorcha Kurien-Walsh | 11 November 2026 |
| 18 | 10 | "Episode 10" | Elliot Hegarty | Sorcha Kurien-Walsh | 18 November 2026 |
| 19 | 11 | "Episode 11" | TBA | TBA | 25 November 2026 |
| 20 | 12 | "Episode 12" | TBA | TBA | 2 December 2026 |

== Production ==
In August 2022, it was reported that Disney+ were planning an eight-part adaptation of the Jilly Cooper novel Rivals. Dominic Treadwell-Collins was on the writing and production team, whilst Cooper and Felicity Blunt, Cooper's literary agent, would serve as executive producers on the show. It was reported that the 1980s novel would be given a "contemporary skew".

The lead director is Elliot Hegarty, who is also credited as an executive producer for episodes 1 through 3. Eliza Mellor is a series producer. The project is produced by Happy Prince with Alexander Lamb, Laura Wade, and Lee Mason also as executive producers. Wade is also co-writer with Treadwell-Collins; the writers' room includes Sophie Goodhart, Marek Horn, Mimi Hare, Clare Naylor, Dare Aiyegbayo, Kefi Chadwick, Tray Agyeman, and Sorcha Kurien Walsh.

In December 2024, it was renewed for a second series. In June 2026, it was renewed for a third series.

=== Casting ===
Casting in lead roles was announced in March 2023, with David Tennant, Danny Dyer, Katherine Parkinson, and Alex Hassell amongst those cast. That same month, Victoria Smurfit and Aidan Turner were added to the cast. In May 2023, the cast was rounded out with Lara Peake and David Calder revealed to be joining the series.

In August 2025, Rupert Everett and Hayley Atwell joined the cast for series 2 alongside Maxim Ays, Holly Cattle, Oliver Dench, Amanda Lawrence, Bobby Lockwood, Eliot Salt and Jonny Weldon. Other new cast members included Olive Tennant and Amelie Child Villiers.

=== Filming ===
The series, which started filming in March 2023, was one of the initial productions to use TBY2, a newly completed facility at The Bottle Yard Studios in Hengrove, Bristol. Filming also took place in Tetbury in Gloucestershire in March 2023. Filming for the second series began on 21 May 2025. Filming locations included Clevedon, Somerset and Corsham, Wiltshire.

== Release ==
The first series was released in the UK and internationally, including Australia, on Disney+ and in the United States on Hulu on 18 October 2024. In October 2025, Hulu was integrated into the Disney+ platform and Star original programming such as Rivals had become Hulu programming worldwide. The second series is set to be released in two parts, with the first part released from 15 May to 5 June 2026 and the second part premiering on 11 November with three episodes, and the remaining three episodes landing weekly afterwards.

== Reception ==
=== Viewership ===
The streaming aggregator Reelgood, which tracks 20 million monthly viewing decisions across all streaming platforms in the U.S., reported that Rivals was the tenth most-streamed series in the U.S. during the week of 10 October 2024. It remained in tenth place for the weeks ending 6 and 13 November.

=== Critical response ===
For the first series, the review aggregator website Rotten Tomatoes reported a 95% approval rating, based on 40 critic reviews. The website's critics consensus reads, "A caustic comedy with swagger, Rivals makes class warfare and catty behavior addictive viewing." Metacritic, which uses a weighted average, assigned a score of 84 out of 100 based on 14 critics, indicating "universal acclaim".

Sophie Gilbert of The Atlantic asserted Rivals captures Jilly Cooper's indulgent world of romantic intrigue and class satire. She praised the adaptation's blend of absurdity and serious pleasure, calling Alex Hassell's portrayal of Rupert both excessive and sympathetic. She found the clash between the '80s TV industry and the pastoral Cotswolds setting unified by rampant sexuality, adding a campy charm. Gilbert stated that the show balances humor with affection for Cooper's era and that its joy and lightheartedness offer a welcome contrast to recent, darker TV series. Rachel Cooke of the New Statesman said that Rivals exudes "sheer, unadulterated perkiness," celebrating Jilly Cooper's Rutshire Chronicles as an unapologetic romp through 1980s British life. She praised the adaptation's treatment as a period piece, reminiscent of Vanity Fair and The Forsyte Saga, praising its humor and satirical edge while avoiding self-consciousness. She found the ensemble cast, particularly Hassell as Rupert Campbell-Black and Tennant as Lord Baddingham, delivered standout performances. Cooke described the show as deeply satisfying and entertaining, full of double entendres and cliffhangers, inviting viewers to enjoy humor in the absurdities of social pretensions.

Lucy Mangan of The Guardian gave Rivals five out of five stars. She said the series launches with bold energy and adherence to Jilly Cooper's original, unapologetically scandalous style. Mangan appreciated that Disney+ preserved the novel's essential elements—sex, excess, and Cooper's sharp social observations—without toning them down. She found the adaptation adept at balancing the over-the-top 1980s attitudes with modern sensibilities, noting its "light touch" and genuine commitment to bringing Rutshire to life. Mangan stated that the adaptation keeps the "rambunctious joy" of Cooper's original, treating escapism as a necessary pleasure rather than a sin. David Opie of Empire rated Rivals four out of five stars. He praised the adaptation for preserving the scandalous and addictive appeal of Jilly Cooper's novels, attributing this to Dominic Treadwell-Collins's expertise in soapy melodrama. He found that the show captures the indulgent spirit of 1980s primetime soaps like Dallas and Dynasty, complimenting the lavish budget and the cast's self-aware performances, especially David Tennant, Aidan Turner, and Katherine Parkinson. Opie stated that the series delivers a "hedonistic riot" and is a confident, nostalgic escape that's both explosive and endlessly enjoyable.

Nick Curtis of The London Standard similarly found the series brash and cartoonish (a description he contrasts with what he considers "good TV") but highly entertaining, calling it "the epitome of guilty-pleasure TV". Rating the series 4 out of 5 stars, he credited Treadwell-Collins and director Elliott Hegarty with understanding the inherent absurdity of Cooper's novel, noting the adaptation is "suffused with affection for Cooper and for the decade that was once a byword for gaudy excess but now looks rather quaint". Curtis praised the star power of the cast, singling out Katherine Parkinson as the show's "human heart", and acknowledged that the show's confident tone compensated for occasional pacing issues and a lack of subtlety.

Ed Power of The Irish Times describes the series as having "too many pants around the ankles, not enough plot". While acknowledging the show was "razor sharp about anti-Irish prejudice in Britain in the 1980s" and successfully captured "the go-go naffness of Margaret Thatcher's Britain", Power found the abundance of sex scenes "silly, prurient and juvenile and waggled in our faces to the point where it becomes a tiresome non-gag". He also wrote that the central rivalry's motivation is unclear, and pointed to a potential cultural difference in taste: "discerning viewers on this side of the Irish Sea might wish for less bonking [...] and more plot".

== Accolades ==
The series was nominated at the 2025 Broadcast Awards with "Agatha is shocked to discover Rupert and Sarah playing tennis in the nude" nominated for TV Moment of the Year. That scene was also nominated for Most Memorable moment at the 2025 British Academy Television Awards. Aidan Turner was nominated for Best Actor and Victoria Smurfit for Best Supporting Actress at the Irish Film and Television Awards in January 2025. The series was nominated for New Drama at the National Television Awards.

| Year | Award | Category | Recipient | Result | Ref. |
|---|---|---|---|---|---|
| 2024 | I Talk Telly Awards | Best New Drama | Rivals | Nominated | |
| 2024 | I Talk Telly Awards | Best Breakthrough | Bella Maclean | Nominated | |
| 2025 | Broadcast Awards | TV Moment of the Year | Rivals | Nominated | |
| 2025 | Irish Film and Television Awards | Best Supporting Actress | Victoria Smurfit | Nominated | |
| 2025 | Irish Film and Television Awards | Best Supporting Actor | Aidan Turner | Nominated | |
| 2025 | Broadcasting Press Guild Awards | Best Drama series | Rivals | Nominated | |
| 2025 | Broadcasting Press Guild Awards | Best Actor | Danny Dyer | Won | |
| 2025 | Broadcasting Press Guild Awards | Best Actress | Katherine Parkinson | Nominated | |
| 2025 | Broadcasting Press Guild Awards | BPG Breakthrough | Bella Maclean | Won | |
| 2025 | Casting Director’s Guild Awards | Best Casting in a TV Drama Series | Kelly Valentine Hendry, Lilly Hanbury and Jessica Mescall (Associates) | Won | |
| 2025 | Royal Television Society Programme Awards | Writer - Drama | Dominic Treadwell-Collins and Laura Wade | Won | |
| 2025 | Royal Television Society Programme Awards | Supporting Actor - Male | Danny Dyer | Won | |
| 2025 | Royal Television Society Programme Awards | Supporting Actor - Female | Katherine Parkinson | Nominated | |
| 2025 | British Academy Television Awards | P&O Cruises Memorable Moment | The Naked Tennis Scene | Nominated | |
| 2025 | British Academy Television Awards | Leading Actor | David Tennant | Nominated | |
| 2025 | British Academy Television Awards | Supporting Actress | Katherine Parkinson | Nominated | |
| 2025 | BAFTA TV Craft Awards | Make up & Hair Design | Jill Sweeney, Abi Brotherton, Natalie Allen, Tiffany Pierre, Franziska Roesslhuber, Martine Watkins | Won | |
| 2025 | BAFTA TV Craft Awards | Original Music: Fiction | Natalie Holt, Jack Halama | Nominated | |
| 2025 | BAFTA TV Craft Awards | Production Design | Dominic Hyman | Won | |
| 2025 | BAFTA TV Craft Awards | Scripted Casting | Kelly Valentine Hendry | Nominated | |
| 2025 | Ivor Novello Awards | Best Television Soundtrack | Jack Halama, Natalie Holt | Nominated | |
| 2025 | National Film Awards | Best Actor | David Tennant | Nominated | |
| 2025 | Broadcast Digital Awards | Best Drama Programme | Rivals | Won | |
| 2025 | Broadcast Digital Awards | Programme of the Year | Rivals | Won | |
| 2025 | National Television Awards | New Drama | Rivals | Nominated | |
| 2025 | International Emmy Awards | Drama Series | Rivals | Won | |
| 2025 | British Academy Scotland Awards | Audience Award | Gary Lamont | Pending | |
| 2025 | British Academy Scotland Awards | Actor Film / Television | David Tennant | Pending | |
