= Romy and Michele 2 =

- Official logo
- Directed by: Tim Federle
- Written by: Robin Schiff
- Produced by: Laurence Mark; Tim Federle
- Starring: Mira Sorvino; Lisa Kudrow; Janeane Garofalo; Alan Cumming; Camryn Manheim; Julia Campbell; Keegan-Michael Key; Rob Huebel; Breckin Meyer; Patrick Warburton; Sofia Wylie; Wendi McLendon-Covey
- Cinematography: Marco Fargnoli
- Edited by: Brian Olds
- Production companies: 20th Century Studios; Laurence Mark Productions; Chorus Boy Productions
- Distributed by: Hulu
- Release date: 2027
- Country: United States
- Language: English

Romy and Michele 2 is an upcoming American comedy film directed by Tim Federle and written by Robin Schiff. It is a direct sequel to Romy and Michele's High School Reunion (1997), and the third installment in the Romy and Michele film series (following Romy and Michele: In the Beginning (2005)). Many cast members from the 1997 movie return, including Mira Sorvino, Lisa Kudrow, Janeane Garofalo, Alan Cumming, Camryn Manheim, and Julia Campbell.

== Cast ==
- Mira Sorvino as Romy White
- Lisa Kudrow as Michele Weinberger
- Janeane Garofalo as Heather Mooney
- Alan Cumming as Sandy Frink
- Camryn Manheim as Toby Walters
- Julia Campbell as Christie Masters
- Keegan-Michael Key
- Rob Huebel
- Breckin Meyer
- Patrick Warburton
- Nathan Lee Graham
- Anna Baryshnikov
- Sofia Wylie
- Wendi McLendon-Covey

== Production ==
=== Development ===
In February 2024, Mira Sorvino revealed that she and Lisa Kudrow were finalizing deals for a sequel to Romy and Michele's High School Reunion, with writer Robin Schiff returning. In January 2025, The Hollywood Reporter said Sorvino and Kudrow were in final talks to return, with filming expected to begin in mid-2025 with Tim Federle directing. In May 2025, Alan Cumming said he would be reprising his role as Sandy Frink in the sequel, which is aiming to release in 2027.

=== Filming ===
Principal photography began in Los Angeles on June 5, 2026, with Janeane Garofalo, Camryn Manheim, and Julia Campbell returning from the first film, alongside Keegan-Michael Key, Rob Huebel, Breckin Meyer, Patrick Warburton, and Nathan Lee Graham joining the cast. In August 2026, Anna Baryshnikov, Sofia Wylie, and Wendi McLendon-Covey were also cast.
