= COBRA (British TV series) =

British TV series

- Also known as: COBRA: Cyberwar (series 2); COBRA: Rebellion (series 3)
- Genre: Political drama; Thriller
- Created by: Ben Richards
- Written by: Ben Richards
- Starring: Robert Carlyle; Victoria Hamilton; Richard Dormer; David Haig; Marsha Thomason; Lucy Cohu; Lisa Palfrey
- Country of origin: United Kingdom
- Original language: English
- No. of series: 3
- No. of episodes: 18

Production
- Executive producers: Charlie Pattinson; Willow Grylls; Elaine Pyke; Ben Richards
- Producer: Joe Donaldson
- Editor: Matt Sandford
- Running time: 41–44 minutes
- Production companies: New Pictures; Sky Studios

Original release
- Network: Sky One (series 1); Sky Max (series 2–3)
- Release: 17 January 2020 – 16 November 2023

Cobra is a British political thriller television series created and written by Ben Richards that stars Robert Carlyle and Victoria Hamilton in lead roles. The first series premiered on 17 January 2020 on Sky One. In February 2020, it was renewed for a second series, subtitled Cyberwar, which premiered on 15 October 2021 on Sky Max, following the shutdown of Sky One. In May 2022, it was renewed for a third series, subtitled Rebellion, which premiered on 12 October 2023.

The title of the series refers to the Cabinet Office Briefing Rooms (COBR), which is often misspelt with a superfluous 'a' in the media, and is a location in Whitehall where British Prime Ministers often hold important emergency meetings.

== Synopsis ==
=== Series 1 ===
A massive solar flare strikes Europe, blowing the electric grid and navigational systems, leaving much of Britain without power and creating social and political chaos. As a result, Prime Minister Robert Sutherland must decide how and where to distribute a limited number of relief generators to provide power. Meanwhile, his daughter Ellie's best friend dies after consuming cocaine and fentanyl Ellie provided. In order to avoid scandal and potentially prison, Ellie is encouraged to lie by press secretary Peter Mott and her mother, Rachel Sutherland, to say the dead friend brought the drugs.

The outage continues in Northumberland, leading to a vigilante force blockading access to the region, hijacking trucks of fuel and water, and calling for an overthrow of the government. Anna Marshall, Sutherland's chief of staff, is unexpectedly visited by an old flame from her days as a war correspondent and finds the passion still exists. Upon finding that he could be associated with a Bosnian mobster, Marshall confides her liaison to Eleanor James, Head of the Joint Intelligence Committee, whose loyalties lie more with the Home Secretary than with the Prime Minister. Meanwhile, Home Secretary Archie Glover-Morgan works to unseat Sutherland by exploiting every possible angle, including the death of Ellie's friend and Marshall's indiscretion, to embarrass and discredit him.

Sutherland uses the British Army to break the Northumberland blockade by any means necessary, including the controversial decision to authorise deadly force, and a young photojournalist is killed. Condemning the handling of the crisis, Glover-Morgan orchestrates a vote of no confidence, then tries to bribe Sutherland into manoeuvring staff into his favour in return for his support during the vote. But after delivering on a promise and successfully restoring power to a beleaguered hospital, Sutherland calls for a general election, confident he will win.

=== Series 2: Cyberwar ===
An explosion on a sunken World War II ammunition ship (the real SS Richard Montgomery, although not named as such) devastates the north Kent coastline, causing hundreds of deaths including that of the area's local MP. Rescue attempts are blocked by a cyber attack that brings mobile communications down, which the government believes may have been orchestrated by Russia in retaliation for Britain's arrest of two people believed to be responsible for the killing of a Ukrainian oligarch who also killed a local rugby coach. As more cyber attacks continue, targeting border security at Dover and the Kent water supply, Sutherland and his government (with a narrow majority of nine MPs) must find out who is responsible while dealing with chaos and panic in the streets. Sutherland must also deal with political threats from both a reinvigorated Labour Party and Glover-Morgan, to whom he reluctantly returns the whip in order to bolster the Tory majority.

=== Series 3: Rebellion ===
The Prime Minister, Robert Sutherland, discovers his daughter is involved with the environmental protest group Planet Resistance, which is disrupting the construction of the Metro Ultraline fast-speed railway network by occupying a tunnel under the small village of Godley Common. Meanwhile, with an upcoming visit from Shirasia royals, a (fictional) Gulf State, several cabinet ministers are trying to control dissent regarding this energy and military ally's arrival.

== Cast and characters ==
=== Main ===
- Robert Carlyle as Robert Sutherland, the Prime Minister and Leader of the Conservative Party
- Victoria Hamilton as Anna Marshall, the Downing Street Chief of Staff and a former war correspondent
- David Haig as Archie Glover-Morgan, a Conservative politician and the Home Secretary. He is reluctantly appointed Foreign Secretary by Sutherland in series 2 and also made Deputy Prime Minister by series 3.
- Lucy Cohu as Rachel Sutherland, a lawyer and wife of Robert Sutherland
- Edward Bennett as Peter Mott, an adviser who served as the Downing Street Press Secretary
- Marsha Thomason as Francine Bridge, a Labour Party MP and later Shadow Environment Secretary who briefly worked for Sutherland
- Lisa Palfrey as Eleanor James, Head of the Joint Intelligence Committee

=== Supporting ===
- Marisa Abela (series 1) and Holly Cattle (series 3) as Ellie Sutherland, the daughter of Robert and Rachel
- Steven Cree as Stuart Collier (series 1), the Chief Constable of Tyneside Police
- Angus Wright as General Rodney Pickering (series 1), Chief of Defence Staff
- Ellie Kendrick as Stephanie Lodge (series 1), a Civil Contingencies Secretariat officer
- Emmanuel Imani as James Odubajo (series 1), a Civil Contingencies Secretariat officer
- Charlie Carrick as Scott Minett (series 1), a former soldier and leader of the People's Justice Movement
- Con O'Neill as Harry Rowntree (series 1), the communist leader of the Lorry Drivers Union
- Alexandre Willaume as Edin Tosumbegovic (series 1), a Bosnian War survivor, hitman for a Serbian mobster and Marshall's lover
- Richard Dormer as Fraser Walker (series 1–2), Director of the Civil Contingencies Secretariat
- Joshua Hogan as Barney Marshall (series 1–2), Anna's son
- Grace Hogg-Robinson as Tess Marshall (series 1–2), Anna's daughter
- Mark Bazeley as Sam Marshall (series 1), Anna's husband
- Richard Pepple as Joseph Obasi (series 2–3), the new Home Secretary and Glover-Morgan's successor
- Alexa Davies as Audrey Hemmings (series 2–3), a senior Civil Contingencies Secretariat officer
- Karan Gill as Hari Misra (series 2), an investigative journalist and podcaster for the website Morbid Symptoms
- Andrew Buchan as Chris Edwards (series 2–3), the Leader of the Labour Party and Leader of the Opposition
- Gregg Chilingirian as Nate Stevens (series 3), a senior member of Planet Resistance and Pollys' partner
- Jane Horrocks as Victoria Dalton (series 3), the Defence Secretary
- Ben Crompton as Henry Wicks (series 3), leader of the radical environmentalist group Planet Resistance
- Anthony Flanagan as Dan Goddard (series 3), a former special forces soldier and Polly Wright's estranged father
- Emily Fairn as Polly Wright (series 3), a member of Planet Resistance and Nate's partner
- Cavan Clerkin as Neil Millar (series 3), Commissioner of the Metropolitan Police
- Geoffrey McGivern as Gerald Kendrick (series 3), CEO of government military contractor Condor Aerotech
- Rina Mahoney as Zelda Gere (series 3), CEO of private security company Rhombus Strategic Services
- Yasmin Al-Khudhairi as Yadira Al-Bilal (series 3), the progressive Princess of the Kingdom of Shirasia
- Khalid Laith as Samir Al-Bilal (series 3), the Crown Prince of the Kingdom of Shirasia

== Episodes ==
Series	Episodes	Originally released		
Series	Episodes	First released	Last released	Network
1	6	17 January 2020	14 February 2020	Sky One
2	6	15 October 2021	19 November 2021	Sky Max
3	6	12 October 2023	16 November 2023	Sky Max

=== Series 1 (2020) ===
No. overall	No. in series	Title	Directed by	Written by	Original release date	UK viewers (millions)
1	1	"Episode 1"	Hans Herbots	Ben Richards	17 January 2020	1.79
2	2	"Episode 2"	Hans Herbots	Ben Richards	24 January 2020	2.21
3	3	"Episode 3"	Hans Herbots	Ben Richards	31 January 2020	1.90
4	4	"Episode 4"	Al Mackay	Ben Richards	7 February 2020	1.85
5	5	"Episode 5"	Al Mackay	Ben Richards	14 February 2020	1.69
6	6	"Episode 6"	Al Mackay	Ben Richards	14 February 2020	1.65

=== Series 2: Cyberwar (2021) ===
No. overall	No. in series	Title	Directed by	Written by	Original release date
7	1	"Episode 1"	Al Mackay	Ben Richards	15 October 2021
Following the election, Sutherland appoints Joseph Obasi as new Home Secretary, while Glover-Morgan has had his whip removed and calls in a now cleared Peter Mott to assist him in getting it back and into government. A Ukrainian oligarch, Michailo Kostenko, is assassinated while leaving a football pitch in a helicopter, crashing into a building in the process, notably killing a rugby coach. The assailants are revealed to be linked to Russia, and Eleanor James warns Sutherland of the diplomatic fallout should they be detained, which Sutherland decided to do anyway given that their attack killed a British citizen on British soil. Podcaster Hari Misra, seen interviewing Francine Bridge at the beginning of the episode, is tipped off via private message as to who the detainees are just before they are arrested on shoplifting charges at Heathrow Airport. In Kent, the police and army are ordered to evacuate people after a World War II vessel with explosives inside is damaged during underwater earthquakes. The wreck eventually folds, causing an explosion and a tsunami that hits land. COBRA loses all contact with Kent, as they discover that hackers have taken down communications.
8	2	"Episode 2"	Al Mackay	Ben Richards	22 October 2021
At sea, Hemmings and Everly climb aboard the life raft and heads for a nearby turbine, where they encounter another boat. Before long the boat sinks after having leaked. Together with its commander, Stewart, they make it onto the turbine platform. Everly decides to swim back to shore to get help, while Hemmings and Stewart wait. All three are rescued. Sutherland calls in the Russian ambassador to answer for the cyberattack and arrests. The ambassador denies knowledge of the arrestees, but points out that the woman is a petty criminal rather than the well-connected intelligence operative the British believe her to be, which is later proven correct. New Labour leader Chris Andrews tempts Francine with the possibility of being made shadow Home Secretary should she return to the party and win the Kent constituency in the by-election likely to be held there due to the death of the local MP in the disaster. Sutherland is relieved to hear that the Singer Report, an inquiry into the shooting deaths along a jammed motorway during Series 1, will largely exonerate the government and orders Anna to leak advance copies. Intelligence operatives inform James that while they are not entirely certain Russia was behind the attack, they believe another one is in the offing; the possibility is also put forward that the earthquakes that triggered the Kent explosion resulted from fracking and that the hackers are trying to stop a controversial proposal by a Chinese company to drill in the North Sea, so the government puts that contract on hold. Communications in Kent are temporarily done through mods to deliver messages and the hospitals are put back in operation. Glover-Morgan proposes to be appointed foreign secretary to Sutherland, along with eight other MPs who lost the whip, in order to shore up the party's majority, and suggests sacking James. Unbeknownst to Francine Bridge, James surveilled another conversation with Hari Misra, who has also received another anonymous tip as to who was responsible for the Kent explosion.
9	3	"Episode 3"	Al Mackay	Ben Richards	29 October 2021
The security scanners at the Port of Dover malfunction and let hundreds of unscanned vehicles past. The port temporarily closes until the situation is handled. Sutherland appoints Glover-Morgan as foreign secretary, with harsh resistance from Marshall, which only worsens when he fields right to extreme right wing candidates for the Kent by-election; meanwhile, Bridge rejoins the Labour Party, and widespread positive reaction to her criticism of the Singer Report leads Andrews to invite her to come along to the memorial for the Kent victims as a way of announcing she will contest the open seat. Radioactive berries are uncovered in one lorry that was unscanned at Dover, and despite the government's attempt to keep both that and the reason for the ports' closure a secret, leaked photos and videos of the berries cause panic buying and protests at other ports. Propaganda videos from right-wing websites use this incident in calling for the violent overthrow of the government and execution of senior officials such as Sutherland, his wife, Glover-Morgan and Obasi. Revelations that Sutherland's wife, Rachel, once worked for a law firm that represented Kostenko in a kickbacks scheme come to light; she denies any knowledge of the illegality to both Robert and the media. A hunt for one remaining lorry ends with its discovery under Waterloo Station. Inside the truck’s container, the police discover a man hanging from the ceiling, his body highly radioactive. Sutherland demands to know who the man is and if Britain might be at war.
10	4	"Episode 4"	Mo Ali	Ben Richards	5 November 2021
The body in the truck is identified as Edward Price, an American secret agent; he is also the man implicated as being behind the Kent explosion in the video sent to Misra. Glover-Morgan asks James to inform the Americans about the matter. After a conversation with Bridge where she accuses him of being too much of a mouthpiece, Misra is sent another leak of documents suggesting the CIA had something to do with the Kent explosion; when he questions its origins the leakers briefly take control of his computer and the cameras in his studio to make their point that they want him to run it. Edwards encourages Bridge to stand in the Kent by-election. Firestorm targets Sutherland, his wife, Lord Singer and other politicians of the Sutherland cabinet; James and Sutherland propose added security for Singer but he refuses it. Soon after, he is killed by a young man with extreme right views. Sutherland and Edwards attend the memorial for the Kent victims, while Bridge remains in London. Marshall expresses her misgivings about Rodger Hawkins, the far-right candidate who Sutherland has chosen for the Kent by-election as the most likely to hold the seat, but he accepts the political necessity of the situation; and she is later criticized by Sutherland for going behind his back. An operation against another member of Firestorm occurs simultaneously as Misra is kidnapped in front of James's arresting team. Misra's kidnappers torture him for information about his "masters", citing a trip he took to Moscow several years earlier; after they are satisfied that he knows nothing he is let go only to be killed. As Bridge arrives at the Morbid Symptoms building, emergency services are putting out a fire that started on the top floor.
11	5	"Episode 5"	Sallie Aprahamian	Ben Richards	12 November 2021
Firestorm spreads rumours of the water supply being contaminated in Kent, pinning it on Sutherland's cabinet; especially after a boy contracts a form of amoebic meningitis that is usually contracted through water. At the same time, both the Labour and Conservative parties begin their campaigns in the area, with a skeptical atmosphere as Firestorm urges people to boycott the elections. Tensions over the water crisis divide Hemmings and her sister-in-law, who is refusing to drink the local tap water. After a boy dies, riots ensue, with fire being set to local government buildings, campaign offices, and police stations. Further racially tinged rhetoric from Hawkins against Bridge, has Marshall asking Sutherland to suspend Hawkins as the Conservative candidate, which in turn leads him to accuse her of secretly favoring Bridge (which Marshall has admitted to Rachel that she does). Glover-Morgan takes matters into his own hands to get Hawkins to back down, but Mott advises him that he has no intention to delete a racist Firestorm meme he shared on Twitter, and Hawkins openly mocks him in person when he asks. James receives further information from the Americans, who also advise her that Sutherland should not resort to a nuclear option. Among themselves, Glover-Morgan, James, Marshall and Obasi express concern about Sutherland's increasingly paranoid and bellicose mental state. Rachel decides to visit Ellie in Chile, a decision condemned by her husband, who fires Marshall over it, deeming her a traitor. Glover-Morgan and Obasi see a power grab opportunity, but the former decides to hold back. James learns of a serious threat from the virus code and tries to get Sutherland to stop a news conference in which he plans to openly name the attacking countries; it is postponed when Sutherland cannot bring himself to speak.
12	6	"Episode 6"	Sallie Aprahamian	Ben Richards	19 November 2021
The cyberattacks pick up momentum when all GPS and navigations systems in vehicles are hacked and put people in misleading directions, causing accidents and traffic jams. Obasi goes to Kent and confronts Hawkins over race-baiting campaign literature, and is unconvinced by Hawkins' disavowal of responsibility or even awareness. Fraser briefs the COBRA group about how further developments could lead to economic collapse, which James explains is due to malware that has already been implanted in the system. She meets with her American counterpart, who remains firm on the British keeping their ground so the US can pressure the Chinese and the Russians to stop. James in return threatens that Britain will implement a nuclear option, its own cyberwar programme targeting worldwide missile defence systems, which could make war very likely, if the attacks are not stopped in time. Sutherland snaps at his cabinet over their perceived disloyalty, leading Walker and Glover-Morgan to defend Marshall's loyalty to him; in a later private meeting with the Prime Minister, James both refuses his offer to replace Marshall and talks him out of firing Walker. Glover-Morgan visits Marshall and asks her to talk to Sutherland, which she eventually does after he meets with Glover-Morgan and Obasi. The economic collapse reaches rock bottom, with the Bank of England unable to process currency transactions and Sutherland is about to order the nuclear option when the virus is finally removed from the system. During this time, Marshall and Bridge are evacuated from their car under Westminster after a motorcyclist drags them out just before a bomb goes off. Sutherland informs Edwards and Bridge about the situation, also receiving their support. At a press conference, Sutherland informs the public about the recent situation, suspends Hawkins as the party's candidate in Kent and expresses condolences for Bridge, who survives with injuries, and Marshall, who is in critical condition.

=== Series 3: Rebellion (2023) ===
No. overall	No. in series	Title	Directed by	Written by	Original release date
13	1	"Episode 1"	Charles Sturridge	Toby Finlay	12 October 2023
14	2	"Episode 2"	Charles Sturridge	Toby Finlay	19 October 2023
15	3	"Episode 3"	Sasha Ransome	James Woods	26 October 2023
16	4	"Episode 4"	Sasha Ransome	Rachel Anthony	2 November 2023
17	5	"Episode 5"	Mo Ali	Toby Finlay	9 November 2023
18	6	"Episode 6"	Mo Ali	Toby Finlay	16 November 2023

== Production ==
The first series has been filmed in Merseyside, Yorkshire and London. Interior scenes set within 10 Downing Street were shot in Capesthorne Hall, Cheshire.

In February 2020, it was renewed for a second series. Filming took place in New Brighton, Wirral and Fleetwood, Lancashire.

In May 2022, it was renewed for a third series titled COBRA: Rebellion. Toby Finlay would be lead writer, joined by James Wood and Rachel Anthony in the writers' room. Principal photography for the third series was underway by October 2022 in the Cheshire village of Lower Peover. In November, it was announced Jane Horrocks had joined the cast of COBRA for its third series as Defence Secretary Victoria Dalton. In January 2023, production crew were reported in Halewood. London's Cenotaph was recreated in Liverpool City Centre later that month.

== Release ==
The first series premiered on 17 January 2020 on Sky One in the United Kingdom. The second series premiered on 15 October 2021 on Sky Max, following the shutdown of Sky One. The third series premiered on 12 October 2023.

The series premiered on 4 October 2020 on PBS in the United States.

== Reception ==
The Telegraph gave the first episode 3/5 stars and called it a gripping thriller, yet "implausible and clichéd". The Independent gave the series 2/5 stars, calling it a "(C)heap-looking series (which) creaks and clunks along", and the best parts are the breaks for commercials. Australia's TV Tonight said it "can’t quite settle on whether it's a political thriller or a disaster mini-series. I’m reminded of Irwin Allen films, or even National Geographic’s American Blackout, with more satisfying results."

== See also ==
- Cabinet Office Briefing Rooms, abbr. COBR, nicknamed Cobra
- List of fictional prime ministers of the United Kingdom
