= Prey for the Devil =

2022 film by Daniel Stamm

- Theatrical release poster
- Directed by: Daniel Stamm
- Screenplay by: Robert Zappia
- Story by: Robert Zappia; Earl Richey Jones; Todd R. Jones
- Produced by: Paul Brooks; Earl Richey Jones; Todd R. Jones; Jessica Malanaphy
- Starring: Jacqueline Byers; Colin Salmon; Christian Navarro; Lisa Palfrey; Nicholas Ralph; Ben Cross; Virginia Madsen
- Cinematography: Denis Crossan
- Edited by: Tom Elkins
- Music by: Nathan Barr
- Production company: Gold Circle Films
- Distributed by: Lionsgate
- Release date: October 28, 2022
- Running time: 93 minutes
- Country: United States
- Language: English
- Box office: $44.7 million

Prey for the Devil is a 2022 American supernatural horror film about a nun who trains as an exorcist under the Roman Catholic Church and confronts demonic possession. The film is produced under the studio Lionsgate and is directed by Daniel Stamm. It stars Jacqueline Byers, Colin Salmon, Christian Navarro, Lisa Palfrey, Nicholas Ralph, Virginia Madsen, and Ben Cross. Lionsgate distributed Prey for the Devil in theaters in the United States and Canada on October 28, 2022. The film received negative reviews from critics and grossed $44.7 million worldwide.

== Plot ==
In response to a global rise in demonic possessions, the Catholic Church reopens exorcism schools to train priests in the Rite of Exorcism.

Although nuns are forbidden to perform exorcisms, Father Quinn recognizes Sister Ann's gifts, including empathy with possessed victims of demons, and agrees to train her. Thrust onto the spiritual frontline with fellow student Father Dante, Ann finds herself in a battle for the soul of a young girl, Natalie, who she believes is possessed by a demon who tormented Ann's mentally unstable mother years ago.

Ann attends classes, against some resistance from staff members and amusement by some priests. Frightening events begin to happen to her, such as disturbing visions and memories, and an elderly, possessed male patient harassing her and dancing with her against her will when she is trapped in his room. However, Ann persists in her quest, delving into secret archives with the help of Dante, and looking into the histories of "terminal cases" likely to die, and of one woman who was released from the institute.

Ann helps exorcise Dante's troubled sister, apparently successfully. However, the school's leadership and the Cardinal tell her next morning that the woman killed herself. Ann unhappily concludes that she will go back to her old convent in response to the tragedy. However, Dante drops by and says that Natalie, who had recovered and left the school, has had a relapse and is likely to be sent to the Vatican as a "terminal case". He convinces her to sneak into the school with him and exorcise Natalie.

Ann is shocked to find that Natalie is her own daughter, whom Ann gave up for adoption years ago, when she was pregnant as a teenager. The anguish of abandonment has made Natalie subject to demonic possession. Eventually, the demon leaves Natalie, but possesses Ann, who falls into a large pool of holy water and, fighting through the anguish of her troubled history, eventually frees herself from the demon.

The school's leadership reward her with an academic fellowship to the Vatican; however, while in a cab, Ann finds that the driver is the old man who had harassed her under demonic influence. The cab stops in the street, and a sinister-looking woman, who was the one released from the institute, stares at her from the street. Ann arms herself with a crucifix as the driver snarls and lunges at her.

== Cast ==
- Jacqueline Byers as Ann
- Colin Salmon as Father Quinn
- Christian Navarro as Father Dante
- Lisa Palfrey as Sister Euphemia
- Nicholas Ralph as Father Raymond
- Posy Taylor as Natalie
- Ben Cross as Cardinal Matthews
- Virginia Madsen as Dr. Peters
- Cora Kirk as Emilia

== Production ==
In October 2019, the film was first announced as The Devil's Light. The screenplay was written by Robert Zappia, and James Hawes was initially set to direct. Lionsgate and Gold Circle Films co-produced the film, with shooting planned to take place in the spring of 2020. Paul Brooks, Jessica Malanaphy, Todd R. Jones, and Earl Richey Jones produced the film while Scott Niemeyer, David Brooks and Brad Kessell were executive producers. Zappia's screenplay, originally titled The Devil's Light, had made the 2018 BloodList. In February 2020, Daniel Stamm was set to direct instead, marking his return to the exorcism sub-genre after the 2010 film The Last Exorcism. In June 2020, Jacqueline Byers was announced as the lead actress, starring alongside Virginia Madsen, Ben Cross, Colin Salmon, Christian Navarro, and Nicholas Ralph.

Filming took place during the summer of 2020 in Sofia, Bulgaria. Actor Ben Cross died on August 18, 2020, and had wrapped filming for his part ten days beforehand.

== Release ==
Prey for the Devil was released in theatres on October 28, 2022, by Lionsgate. It was previously scheduled to be theatrically released in the United States on January 8, 2021, then moved to February 11, 2022.

The film was released for VOD platforms on December 13, 2022, followed by a Blu-ray, DVD and 4K UHD release on January 3, 2023.

== Reception ==
=== Box office ===
Prey for the Devil grossed $19.8 million in the United States and Canada, and $24.9 million in other territories, for a worldwide total of $44.7 million.

In the United States and Canada, Prey for the Devil was released alongside the wide expansions of Tár and Till, and was projected to gross $7–8 million from 2,980 theaters in its opening weekend. The film made $2.8 million on its first day, including $660,000 from Thursday night previews. It went on to debut to $7.2 million, finishing third at the box office. In its second weekend the film dropped 46% to $3.9 million, finishing in fifth.

=== Critical response ===
On the review aggregator website Rotten Tomatoes, 15% of 34 critics' reviews are positive, with an average rating of 4.2/10. The website's consensus reads: "There's no dearth of possession stories within the genre, and potboiler Prey for the Devil may leave completists needing a truly horrific — or at least fun — exorcist palate cleanser." Metacritic, which uses a weighted average, assigned the film a score of 38 out of 100, based on 5 critics, indicating "generally unfavorable" reviews. Audiences polled by CinemaScore gave the film an average grade of "C+" on an A+ to F scale.

Leigh Monson of The A.V. Club gave the film a D grade, writing, "Its dominant thematic threads are at war with one another, shambling around as one story wears the flesh and appearance of another, leaving neither premise wholly intact in a film with the meat stripped from its bones." The South China Morning Post's James Marsh gave it 1/5 stars, saying it "seems content to congregate crowds of stern-faced priests around a shrieking bedridden child and have them spout erroneous incantations for 90 minutes. Even with the most forgiving of horror fans, it doesn't have a hope in hell." A.A. Dowd of the Houston Chronicle called the film "a piously dull and scare-free addition to the ever-growing canon of Exorcist wannabes" and "just another regurgitation of yesterday's devout scare tactics, spewing diet 'Exorcism' clichés as freely as Linda Blair once painted the walls in pea soup."

Dennis Harvey of Variety was more positive, writing, "even if it falls short of being particularly memorable or scary, this is a decently entertaining possession potboiler."
