= Max McLean =

American actor

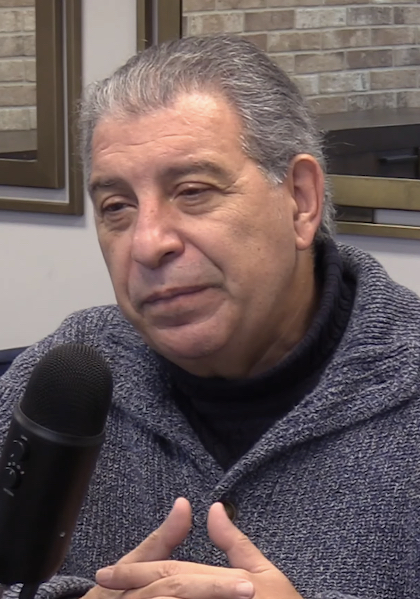
- McLean in 2019
- Born: April 14, 1953 (age 73); Panama City, Panama
- Education: University of Texas
- Occupations: Stage actor, writer, and producer
- Years active: 1992-present
- Spouse: Sharon McLean
- Children: 2

Max McLean (born April 14, 1953) is a Panamanian-born American stage actor, writer, and producer. He is the founder and artistic director of the Fellowship for Performing Arts, a New York City-based company that produces live theater and film from a Christian worldview.

McLean is known for his stage adaptations of books by author and theologian C. S. Lewis. Some of McLean's adaptations include The Screwtape Letters (written with Jeffrey Fiske), The Great Divorce (written with Brian Watkins), and C.S. Lewis Onstage: The Most Reluctant Convert (based on Surprised by Joy). C.S. Lewis Onstage was adapted into a film, The Most Reluctant Convert: The Untold Story of C.S. Lewis, which starred McLean as an older Lewis and was released in 2021.

Outside of his work regarding Lewis, McLean wrote the play Martin Luther on Trial with Chris Cragin-Day, and narrated KJV, NIV, and ESV versions of "The Listener's Bible", an audio Bible.

== Early life and education ==
McLean was born in Panama City, Panama, on April 14, 1953. McLean immigrated to the United States through New York City at age four.

McLean graduated from the University of Texas in 1975, where participation in theater helped him overcome a fear of public speaking. After graduating, he pursued theatrical studies in London.

== Career ==
In 1992, McLean founded the non-profit theatre company, the Fellowship for Performing Arts (abbreviated as FPA).

Early on, McLean and the FPA toured and performed at colleges and universities. These included one-man shows with dramatic presentations of books of the Bible. He has adapted Genesis, the Acts and the Gospel of Mark (called Mark's Gospel).

=== C. S. Lewis stage adaptations ===
After seeing McLean perform Genesis, playwright Jeff Fiske emailed McLean, telling him that he would portray Screwtape well. With Fiske, McLean adapted the 1942 novel The Screwtape Letters by C. S. Lewis as a stageplay, which stars McLean as Screwtape. It has been performed since 2006, and has received positive responses from critics.

McLean and co-writer Brian Watkins developed a stageplay for the 1945 Lewis novel, The Great Divorce, and in September 2013, McLean brought it to the Cape Playhouse in New York City for the development production. On December 13, 2013, it premiered at the Herberger Theater Center in Phoenix, Arizona, and toured nationally in 2014. In December 2019, a revised revival of The Great Divorce opened at Theatre Three on Theatre Row in New York City. After this, it began a national tour.

McLean adapted the 1955 Lewis book Surprised by Joy into the one-man play, C.S. Lewis on Stage: The Most Reluctant Convert. McLean also stars as Lewis. The play was adapted into the film, The Most Reluctant Convert: The Untold Story of C.S. Lewis, which McLean reprises his role in as an older Lewis. It was released in 2021.

=== Other projects ===
McLean co-wrote the play, Martin Luther on Trial, with playwright and drama professor Chris Cragin-Day, which premiered at the Lansburgh Theatre in Washington, D.C., on May 12, 2016.

=== Awards ===
In 2009, McLean received the Jeff Award for Best Solo Performance for his one-man show Mark's Gospel.

McLean's narrations for The Listener's Bible have received several Audie Award nominations in total. One in 1999 for the "Inspirational" category, one in 2000 for "Package Design", and one in 2002 for "Inspirational/Spiritual".

== Personal life ==
In 1976, McLean became a Protestant Christian, after having grown up a nominal Catholic.

He is married to Sharon McLean, and they have two grown daughters. They live in New York City, and are members of the Redeemer Presbyterian Church.
