= Hello & Paris =

- Directed by: Elizabeth Chomko
- Written by: Elizabeth Chomko
- Based on: That Part Was True by Deborah McKinlay
- Produced by: Finola Dwyer
- Starring: Javier Bardem; Kate Hudson; Steve Zahn; Phil Dunster; Gemma Chan; Aisling Bea; Marianne Jean-Baptiste; Amber Valletta
- Cinematography: John Mathieson
- Production company: Fifth Season
- Distributed by: Amazon MGM Studios
- Country: United States
- Language: English

Hello & Paris is an upcoming American romantic comedy film written and directed by Elizabeth Chomko. It is inspired by the 2014 novel That Part Was True by Deborah McKinlay. It stars Javier Bardem, Kate Hudson, Steve Zahn, Phil Dunster, Gemma Chan, Aisling Bea, Marianne Jean-Baptiste, and Amber Valletta.

== Premise ==
A landscape architect and a novelist have a prickly first meeting in Paris before gradually getting to know each other and fall in love as they exchange books and recipes while residing on opposite sides of the Atlantic Ocean.

== Cast ==
- Javier Bardem
- Kate Hudson
- Steve Zahn
- Phil Dunster
- Gemma Chan
- Aisling Bea
- Marianne Jean-Baptiste
- Rupert Penry-Jones
- Trudie Styler
- Amber Valletta
- Bella Maclean
- Eliot Sumner
- Thaddea Graham

== Production ==
In February 2026, it was reported that Elizabeth Chomko had written and would direct Hello & Paris, a romantic comedy film loosely inspired by the 2014 novel That Part Was True by Deborah McKinlay, with Javier Bardem and Kate Hudson set to star. In April, it was reported that Amazon MGM Studios had acquired distribution rights to the film for over $30 million, with filming set to begin at the end of the month. In May 2026, Steve Zahn joined the cast with filming underway. In June, Phil Dunster, Gemma Chan, Aisling Bea, Marianne Jean-Baptiste, Rupert Penry-Jones, Trudie Styler, Amber Valletta, Bella Maclean, Eliot Sumner, and Thaddea Graham were added to the cast.
