= Cattle (disambiguation) =

Cattle (Bos taurus) are the most common type of large domesticated ungulates.

Cattle may also refer to:

- Bos, the genus of wild and domestic cattle including:
  - Beef cattle
  - Dairy cattle
  - Wild cattle, including aurochs
- Cattle, any kind of livestock
- "Cattle", a song by The Verve Pipe from Villains
- Al-An'am, the sixth sura of the Qur'an, usually translated as “Cattle” or “The Cattle”.

Notable people with the surname, Cattle, include:

- Christopher Cattle, British furniture designer
- Gavin Cattle (born 1980), Welsh former rugby union player
- Holly Cattle (born 1997), English actress
- Emma Cattle (born 1988), British swimmer

== See also ==
- Chattel, any kind of personal property
