= Laurence Mark =

American film producer

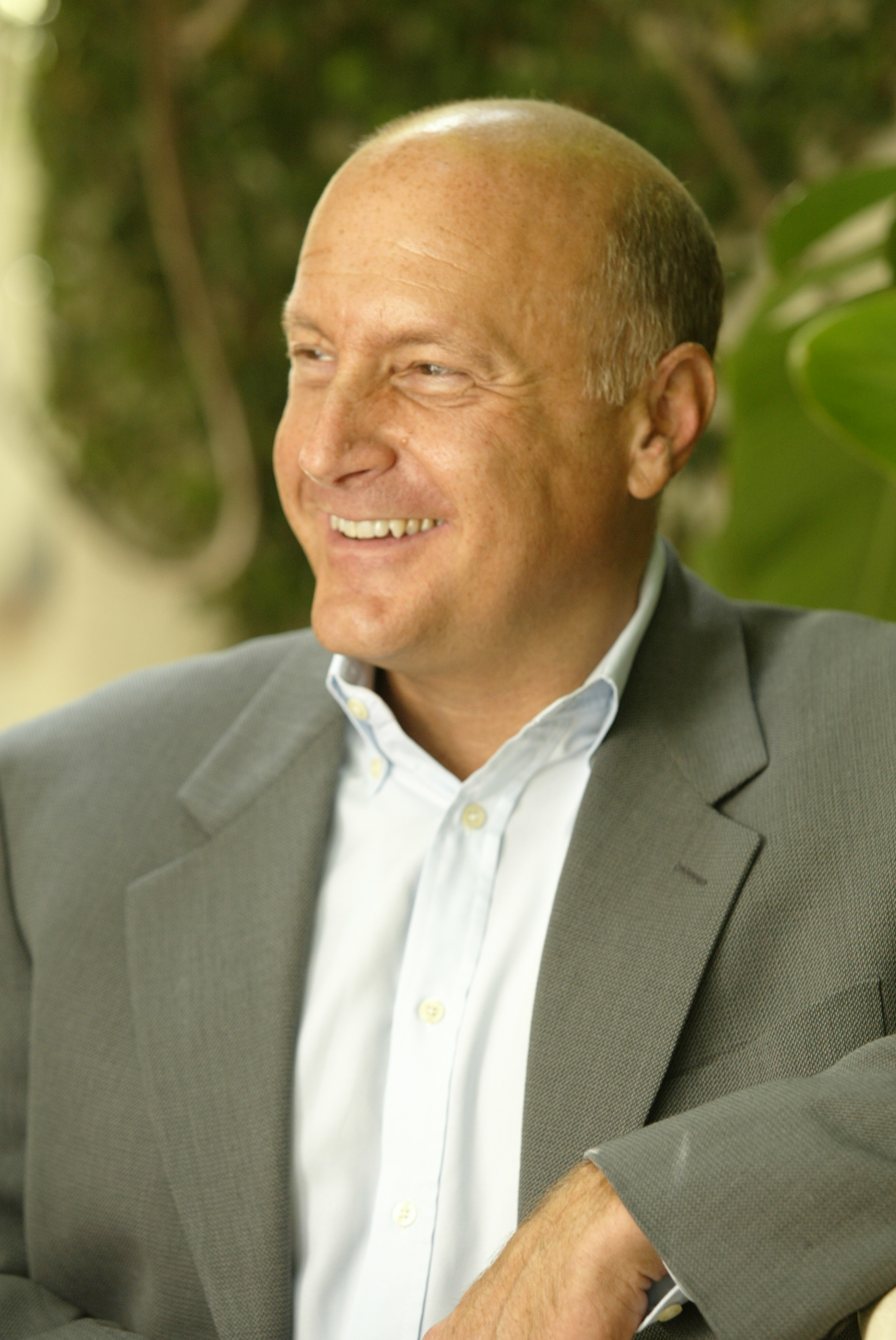
- Mark in 2004
- Born: c. 1949 (age 76–77); New York City, New York, U.S.
- Education: Wesleyan University; New York University
- Occupations: Film producer; Television producer

Laurence Mark is an American film and television producer. His works include The Greatest Showman (2017), Julie & Julia (2009), Dreamgirls (2006), I, Robot (2004), As Good as It Gets (1997), and Jerry Maguire (1996).

== Life and career ==
Mark's production of The Greatest Showman, the movie musical starring Hugh Jackman, Zac Efron, Michelle Williams and Zendaya and directed by Michael Gracey, grossed over $425 million worldwide. It has achieved the highest domestic gross ($174 million) of any live-action original movie musical of all time.

Mr. Mark has just finished production on Romy and Michele 2, starring Lisa Kudrow, Mira Sorvino, Alan Cumming and Janeane Garofalo and directed by Tim Federle for Hulu, as well as A Matter of Time starring Ben Stiller and Nicholas Galitzine and directed by Harry Bradbeer for Netflix Both films are scheduled to be released in the spring of 2027.

Mark most recently produced the film Lady Chatterley's Lover (2022), based on the novel by D. H. Lawrence. This Netflix/Sony adaptation stars Emma Corrin and Jack O’Connell and is directed by Laure de Clermont-Tonnerre with a script written by David Magee.

He also served as one of the executive producers of Vivo, an animated movie musical with original songs and the voice of another executive producer Lin-Manuel Miranda in the title role. Directed by Kirk DeMicco, the movie was released by Netflix in conjunction with Sony Pictures Animation, and it was one of Netflix’s strongest performers, the fifth longest running movie in 2021 on the streamer’s Top Ten List.

Mark previously produced Last Vegas (2013), starring Michael Douglas, Robert De Niro, Morgan Freeman and Kevin Kline, and directed by Jon Turteltaub; Flatliners (2017), starring Elliot Page, Diego Luna, Nina Dobrev and directed by Niels Arden Oplev; and Julie & Julia (2009), starring Meryl Streep and Amy Adams and written and directed by Nora Ephron.

For television, Mark was an executive producer of When We Rise, the limited series created and written by Dustin Lance Black and starring Guy Pearce, Mary-Louise Parker and Rachel Griffiths which aired early in 2021 on ABC.

With Bill Condon, Mark served as producer of the Hugh Jackman-hosted 81st Academy Awards , which earned him an Emmy nomination. The show itself received ten Emmy nominations and won four.

Before that, Mark produced Dreamgirls (2006), starring Jamie Foxx, Beyoncé Knowles and Eddie Murphy and directed by Bill Condon. The film won three Golden Globe Awards, including one for Best Picture. It also received eight Academy Award nominations, the most of any movie in its year, and won two of them, including one for Jennifer Hudson as Best Supporting Actress.

Mark received an Academy Award nomination for producing Best Picture nominee Jerry Maguire, and he executive-produced two other Academy Award nominees for Best Picture, As Good as It Gets and Working Girl.

Mark garnered an Emmy nomination and a Golden Globe nomination as executive producer of Political Animals, a limited series created by Greg Berlanti and starring Sigourney Weaver which aired in 2012 on the USA Network.

He was also an executive producer of The Art of More starring Dennis Quaid, Kate Bosworth, Cary Elwes and Christian Cooke which streamed for two seasons on Sony's Crackle.

Mark also produced Romy and Michele's High School Reunion, Last Holiday, and The Lookout, which won the Independent Spirit Award for Best First Feature. In addition to these films, Mark produced Finding Forrester, The Object of My Affection, Anywhere but Here, The Adventures of Huck Finn, Black Widow and Center Stage (plus its two sequels).

Laurence Mark Productions is headquartered at Sony Pictures Entertainment where the company has a long-term production arrangement with Columbia Pictures. Mark's other producing credits include Sister Act 2, True Colors, Bicentennial Man, Simon Birch, Riding in Cars with Boys, Glitter, and How Do You Know.

Prior to producing, Mark held several publicity and marketing posts at Paramount Pictures, before being appointed Vice President of West Coast Marketing. He then moved into production, and as Vice President of Production at Paramount and Executive Vice President of Production at Twentieth Century Fox, he was closely involved with the development and production of such films as Terms of Endearment, Trading Places, Falling in Love, The Fly and Broadcast News. By 1986, he left Fox in order to start off Laurence Mark Productions, with a three-year, non-exclusive, first-look agreement at the Fox studio.

Mark was born in New York City and educated at Eaglebrook School, The Hotchkiss School, and Wesleyan University, from which he graduated in 1971. He holds a Masters of Arts degree in Film from New York University.

He currently resides in Los Angeles and New York.

== Films ==
He was a producer in all films unless otherwise noted.

=== Film ===
Year	Film	Credit
1987	Black Widow	Executive producer
1988	My Stepmother Is an Alien	Executive producer
1988	Working Girl	Executive producer
1989	Cookie	
1990	Mr. Destiny	Executive producer
1991	True Colors	
1991	One Good Cop	
1993	The Adventures of Huck Finn	
1993	Gunmen	
1993	Sister Act 2: Back in the Habit	Executive producer
1995	Tom and Huck	
1995	Cutthroat Island	
1996	Jerry Maguire	
1997	Romy and Michele's High School Reunion	
1997	As Good as It Gets	Executive producer
1998	Deep Rising	
1998	The Object of My Affection	
1998	Simon Birch	
1999	Anywhere but Here	
1999	Bicentennial Man	
2000	Hanging Up	
2000	Center Stage	
2000	Finding Forrester	
2001	Glitter	
2001	Riding in Cars with Boys	
2004	I, Robot	
2006	Last Holiday	
2006	Dreamgirls	
2007	The Lookout	
2008	Center Stage: Turn It Up	
2009	Julie & Julia	
2010	How Do You Know	
2013	Last Vegas	
2014	Date and Switch	
2017	Flatliners	
2017	The Greatest Showman	
2021	Vivo	Executive producer
2022	Lady Chatterley's Lover	
2023	Spinning Gold	
2025	Juliet & Romeo	Executive producer
2027	Romy and Michele 2	
2027	A Matter of Time	

Miscellaneous crew

Year	Film	Role
1976	Won Ton Ton, the Dog Who Saved Hollywood	Assistant: David V. Picker

Thanks

Year	Film	Role
2004	Spanglish	Special thanks

=== Television ===
Year	Title	Credit	Notes
1989	Sweet Bird of Youth	Executive producer	Television film
1997	Oliver Twist	Executive producer	Television film
2001	These Old Broads	Executive producer	Television film
2001	Kiss My Act	Executive producer	Television film
2005	Romy and Michele: In the Beginning	Consulting producer	Television film
2009	81st Academy Awards		Television special
2012	Political Animals	Executive producer	
2015−16	The Art of More	Executive producer	
2016	Center Stage: On Pointe	Executive producer	Television film
2017	When We Rise	Executive producer	

== Awards and nominations ==
Year	Award	Category	Film	Result
1997	Academy Awards	Best Picture	Jerry Maguire	Nominated
2005	Black Reel Awards	Best Film	I, Robot	Nominated
2006	Producers Guild of America Awards	Best Theatrical Motion Picture	Dreamgirls	Nominated
2007	Black Reel Awards	Best Film	Dreamgirls	Won
2008	Independent Spirit Awards	Best First Feature	The Lookout	Won
2012	Emmy Awards	Outstanding Miniseries or Movie	Political Animals	Nominated
