= Gary Lamont =

Scottish actor

- Born: Glasgow, Scotland
- Education: Royal Scottish Academy of Music and Drama
- Occupation: Actor

Gary Lamont is a Scottish actor, best known for his role as hairdresser Robbie Fraser in the soap opera River City, a role which he played from 2009 to 2017, and as Charles Fairburn in Rivals (2024–present).

== Career ==
Lamont grew up in the Castlemilk area of Glasgow. He attended the RSAMD in Glasgow. As well as his popular role on River City, he appeared in the French war drama Joyeux Noël, Edinburgh crime drama Rebus and comedy Still Game as a barrister.

After leaving River City, he trained to be a funeral celebrant as a sideline and made it the subject of his 2019 Edinburgh Fringe show. Lamont appeared in the 2022 Netflix film Boiling Point alongside Stephen Graham, as well as its 2023 television continuation.

== Filmography ==
Key
†	Denotes films that have not yet been released

=== Film ===
Year	Title	Role	Notes
2005	Joyeux Noël	Scottish soldier	
2017	Kimye Body Guard	Kanye West	Video
2018	Ghosted	Mark	Short
2021	Boiling Point	Dean	
2023	Silent Roar	Mr. Brian	
2023	My Mother's Wedding	Nurse	

=== Television ===
Year	Title	Role	Notes
2006	Rebus	Vincent Hawkes	Episode: "Strip Jack"
2007	Still Game	Lawyer	Episode: "Recipe"
2009–2017	River City	Robbie Fraser	214 episodes
2020–2023	Outlander	Evan Lindsay	9 episodes
2021	The North Water	Webster	4 episodes
2022	Karen Pirie	Paul	3 episodes
2022	I Hate Suzie	Matt	3 episodes
2023	Boiling Point	Dean	Main role
2024	Rivals	Charles Fairburn	
2026	Number 10 †		Upcoming series
