= Hubert Burton =

English actor

- Born: London, England
- Occupation: Actor
- Years active: 2014–present

Hubert Burton is an English actor best known for his roles as Rusbridger in Living (2022), Gerald Middleton in Rivals (2024), Wyndham Best in Their Finest (2016) and his role in the premiere production of the acclaimed play The Inheritance (2018–2019).

== Early life and education ==
Burton was born in London and raised near Basingstoke before attending Sherborne School. Burton discovered an affinity for acting at school under director Alastair Whatley, and was accepted to The Royal Academy of Dramatic Art in 2011. During his training, he performed in productions of Betrayal, Twelfth Night and The Sea, among others. He graduated from RADA with a Bachelor of Fine Arts degree in 2014.

== Career ==
After graduating from RADA, Burton made his television acting debut as Cyril in the 2014 BBC drama The Passing Bells, after which he was cast in The Outcast (2014) and Channel 4's UKIP: The First 100 Days (2015). He also featured in the 2015 ITV series Jekyll and Hyde and The Last Post (2017). In 2016, he played the character of Wyndham Best in the Lone Scherfig film Their Finest and in 2022 he was cast in the role of Mr Rusbridger in Living, a British adaptation of the Japanese film Ikiru, starring Bill Nighy. In 2023, it was announced that Burton had joined the cast of a television adaptation of Jilly Cooper's 1988 novel Rivals on Disney+, playing the recurring role of Gerald Middleton.

In theatre, Burton was cast in 2015 in a new production of Harley Granville Barker's Waste at The National Theatre in London, followed by an acclaimed 2016 production of The Deep Blue Sea starring Helen McCrory, again at The National Theatre. In 2018, Burton was cast in the original Young Vic production of The Inheritance by Matthew Lopez, which debuted to critical acclaim. The play then transferred to the Noël Coward Theatre in the West End, with Burton reprising his role. The Inheritance went on to win numerous accolades, including Best Play at the Evening Standard Theatre Awards and Best New Play at the Laurence Olivier Awards. In 2019, Burton starred as Greg in a production of Relatively Speaking at Salisbury Playhouse, followed by a starring role in a new play by Pamela Carter, The Misfortune of the English at Orange Tree Theatre in London. From 2022 to 2023 he played the role of Tim Allgood in a revival of Noises Off, which toured the UK before transferring to London's West End. In 2024 Burton played the role of Delio in a modern retelling of The Duchess of Malfi by Zinnie Harris in London's West End.

== Filmography ==
=== Film ===
Year	Title	Role	Notes
2014	Testament of Youth	Wounded Tommy	
2016	Their Finest	Wyndham Best	
2021	The Most Reluctant Convert	Owen Barfield	
2022	Living	Rusbridger	
2025	Mr Burton	Robert "Tim" Hardy	

=== Television ===
Year	Title	Role	Notes
2014	Holby City	Tom Reck	Episode: "Severed"
2014	The Passing Bells	Cyril	5 episodes
2015	The Outcast	Ed Rawlins	2 episodes
2015	UKIP: The First 100 Days	Harry Long-Innes	Television film
2015	Jekyll and Hyde	Tom Bateman	3 episodes
2017	The Last Post	Hugo Rankin	Episode: "Starfish"
2024–present	Rivals	Gerald Middleton	Recurring, 13 episodes
2024	Wolf Hall: The Mirror and the Light	Thomas Howard the Lesser	2 episodes
2024	Miss Austen	Edward Austen Knight	2 episodes

=== Theatre ===
Year	Title	Role	Location
2010	Journey's End	German Soldier	Original Theatre Company
2015	She Stoops to Conquer	Charles Marlow	Bath Theatre Royal
2015	Waste	Walter Kent	The National Theatre
2016	The Deep Blue Sea	Philip Welsh	The National Theatre
2018–2019	The Inheritance	Young Henry/Young Man 3	Young Vic/Noël Coward Theatre
2019	Relatively Speaking	Greg	Salisbury Playhouse
2019	Breaking the Code	Christopher Morcom	Salisbury Playhouse
2021	Into the Night	Narrator	Original Theatre Company
2022	The Misfortune of the English	Harrison	Orange Tree Theatre
2022–2023	Noises Off	Tim Allgood	Phoenix Theatre, London
2024	The Duchess	Delio	Trafalgar Theatre
