= Young Sherlock (British TV series) =

2026 British television series

- Genre: Mystery
- Created by: Matthew Parkhill
- Inspired by: Young Sherlock Holmes by Andrew Lane Sherlock Holmes canon by Arthur Conan Doyle
- Developed by: Peter Harness; Guy Ritchie
- Starring: Hero Fiennes Tiffin; Dónal Finn; Zine Tseng; Joseph Fiennes; Natascha McElhone; Max Irons; Colin Firth; Numan Acar; Holly Cattle
- Opening theme: "Days Are Forgotten" by Kasabian
- Country of origin: United Kingdom
- Original language: English
- No. of series: 1
- No. of episodes: 8

Production
- Executive producers: Guy Ritchie; Ivan Atkinson; Simon Kelton; Dhana Rivera Gilbert; Marc Resteghini; Simon Maxwell; Harriet Creelman; Colin Wilson; Matthew Parkhill
- Producer: Max Keene
- Running time: 43–55 minutes
- Production companies: Inspirational Entertainment; Motive Pictures; Toff Guy Films; Amazon MGM Studios

Original release
- Network: Amazon Prime Video
- Release: 4 March 2026 – present

Young Sherlock is a British mystery television series that is created by Matthew Parkhill and developed by Peter Harness and Guy Ritchie who also directed two episodes. It is inspired by Andrew Lane's Young Sherlock Holmes book series, itself a pastiche of Arthur Conan Doyle's original Sherlock Holmes stories. Hero Fiennes Tiffin stars as Holmes. The series premiered on Amazon Prime Video on 4 March 2026. In April 2026, the show was renewed for a second series.

== Premise ==
As a 19-year-old at Oxford University, Sherlock Holmes is not yet the master detective he grows up to be. He is raw and unfiltered, and he lacks discipline. A murder at Oxford puts Holmes's freedom at risk, and he sets out to solve his first murder mystery that leads him to a global-level conspiracy.

== Cast and characters ==
=== Main ===
- Hero Fiennes Tiffin as Sherlock Holmes, an unruly 19-year-old amateur investigator
- Dónal Finn as James Moriarty, Sherlock's new friend
- Zine Tseng as Princess Gulun Shou'an / Xiao Wei (season 1), a scholar and martial artist posing as a princess of the Qing dynasty. She is Sherlock's rival turned ally and love interest.
- Joseph Fiennes as Silas Holmes (season 1), the father of Mycroft, Sherlock, and Beatrice
- Natascha McElhone as Cordelia Holmes, the mother of Mycroft, Sherlock, and Beatrice
- Max Irons as Mycroft Holmes, the older brother of Sherlock and Beatrice
- Colin Firth as Sir Bucephalus Hodge (season 1), a dean at Candlin College in Oxford
- Numan Acar as Esad Kasgarli (season 1), Silas' intermediary
- Holly Cattle as Edie / Beatrice Holmes, Hodge's helper who later turns out to be the younger sister of Sherlock and Mycroft, who had been falsely deemed dead.
- Olivia Williams (season 2)
- Sophie Skelton (season 2)
- Indira Varma (season 2)
- Aidan Gillen (season 2)

=== Supporting ===
- Ravi Aujla as Professor Kishore Malik
- Paul Antony-Barber as Professor Charles Thompson
- Ian Midlane as Professor Ambrose Roberts
- James Sobol Kelly as Professor Theodore Enright
- Stephen Agnew as Nathan Burford
- Nicholas Asbury as Ezra Hornsby
- Jeff Bennett as Smudger
- Scott Reid as Constable Lestrade
- Simon Delaney as Detective Fitget
- Iris Li as Mei Yi Liu
- Adam James as Dr. Charles Maltby
- Rachel Shelley as Anna Tilcott
- Jessica Zhou as Emine

== Episodes ==
No.	Title	Directed by	Written by	Original release date
1	"The Case of the Missing Scrolls"	Guy Ritchie	Matthew Parkhill and Peter Harness	4 March 2026
A childhood flashback shows young Sherlock Holmes failing to watch his sister Beatrice, who disappears. In the present, Sherlock is released from prison after he was sentenced for pickpocketing. His brother Mycroft secures him a position at Oxford's Candlin College as a scout (servant). Sherlock meets Princess Shou'an of China, who possessed priceless fifth-century BC scrolls of Sun Tzu's The Art of War, and befriends the student James Moriarty. When the scrolls are stolen, Sherlock becomes the prime suspect, but Shou'an allows him to investigate. He determines that the break-in was staged from the inside and that the scrolls never left the building. Sherlock then discovers a hidden passageway rigged with a bomb timed to explode during a gala. Sherlock and Moriarty evacuate the gala moments before the bomb detonates. The scrolls are recovered, but Professor Thompson is found murdered, and Sherlock is arrested on suspicion.
2	"The Case of the Burnt Photograph"	Guy Ritchie	Steve Thompson	4 March 2026
Sherlock is interrogated for Thompson's murder, but cannot remember the previous night. Shou'an denies spending time with him, and Mycroft's appeal to Sir Bucephalus Hodge is rebuffed. After Hodge revokes Moriarty's scholarship, he breaks Sherlock out of prison. In hiding, they deduce that Shou'an drugged Sherlock's drink and framed him for Thompson's murder. Sherlock recalls a burnt photograph that she tried to conceal. He traces it to a local photographer and discovers that it shows four professors – Thompson, Roberts, Enright, and Malik – who were all seated near the bomb at the gala. Sherlock and Mortiaty race to warn the surviving professors, but find that Roberts is already dead. Meanwhile, Shou'an meets with her co-conspirators and is ordered to eliminate the remaining professors within a week.
3	"The Case of the Unarmed Man"	Anders Engström	Melissa Bubnic	4 March 2026
Sherlock and Moriarty investigate Professor Enright's rooms while Shou'an stalks her next target. They uncover Enright's research into mineral extraction in the Gansu Corridor and connect it to Sir Bucephalus Hodge's fortune and a secret project involving the four doomed professors. After decoding clues from Enright's student, Sherlock and Moriarty trace the professor to a bell tower, but arrive too late: Shou'an murders him and escapes, revealing that Sherlock himself unwittingly helped her find him. A clue from one of Shou'an's gloves leads Sherlock to suspect that the woman at Oxford is not the real princess at all, and Ezra Hornsby's testimony confirms the real Shou'an was likely replaced during the earlier kidnapping. Flashbacks reveal Shou'an was manipulated into hunting the "four apostles" to avenge her slaughtered family, but she begins to realise that her co-conspirators have been using her. Sherlock, Moriarty, and Mycroft convince Hodge to help them set a trap using Professor Malik as bait. Shou'an infiltrates the house despite a police watch, but Sherlock confronts her before she can kill again. She is arrested after hinting at a threat closer to home.
4	"The Case of the Missing Button"	Anders Engström	Steve Thompson	4 March 2026
Sherlock visits his mother Cordelia in the asylum, where he discovers a hidden recording device in her room. He breaks her out and brings her to the Holmes family home with Moriarty. Cordelia's repeated warning about "the man with the bird's claw" leads Sherlock to deduce that she is describing Professor Malik's distinctive walking cane, suggesting Malik has been secretly recording her. Sherlock and Moriarty question the imposter in her cell; she reveals a safe house and confirms Malik is connected to whoever orchestrated the murders. The real Princess Shou'an tells Hodge that her captors spoke of meeting Malik at a ruined medieval abbey. Meanwhile, Moriarty and Sherlock find solicitor Lawson Jaggers apparently murdered and a recording cylinder sabotaged to conceal what passed between him and Cordelia. At the abbey, Hodge confronts Malik, who reveals he betrayed Hodge because he feared his discoveries would be stolen; Hodge then collapses and dies – apparently poisoned. The imposter escapes custody, and Silas Holmes unexpectedly arrives.
5	"The Case of Young Sherlock Holmes"	Anders Engström	Matthew Parkhill	4 March 2026
With Silas's return, the Holmes family reunites. Cordelia, now on adjusted medication, enjoys a rare family dinner. Silas reveals that Professor Malik had been recording multiple asylum patients as supposed scientific research, and that solicitor Jaggers took his own life when the scheme faced discovery. Sherlock and Moriarty investigate Silas's finances and uncover that four of his companies went bankrupt in 1858, only for his fortunes to reverse the following year – the year his daughter Beatrice died. They learn that Silas took power of attorney over Cordelia when she was committed, seizing control of the estate, and that he paid off the groundskeeper's debt shortly after Beatrice's death. The family doctor confirms he was never summoned to examine Beatrice's body, an outside doctor from Oxford having been called instead. Growing suspicious that his sister's death was staged, Sherlock exhumes her grave and discovers the skeleton lacks the broken arm Beatrice sustained in childhood – the body is not hers, raising the possibility that Beatrice is still alive.
6	"The Case of the Killing Jar"	Dennie Gordon	Matthew Parkhill	4 March 2026
Following the exhumation, Silas deflects Sherlock's accusations and dismisses his suspicions as inherited madness. Sherlock deduces from the estate game book that groundskeeper Nathan Burford smuggled Beatrice off the property in a delivery cart the day after her supposed death. The trail leads to a woman in Highgate, Mrs Tilcott, who raised Beatrice as "Hannah" until she left at fourteen, having received annual birthday gifts of pinned butterflies from an anonymous benefactor. Sherlock traces the specialist pins to a London shop, while Mycroft coerces information from Malik's associate, learning Malik has fled to Paris. The family converges there, navigating revolutionary barricades to reach Les Folies Bergère, where Silas is discovered attending a clandestine arms demonstration. Malik unveils an odourless, colourless nerve agent, known as the "creeping death", capable of killing entire neighbourhoods, and offers it for sale to foreign military buyers. Sherlock intervenes to disrupt the sale, confronting Silas directly, as it becomes clear that Silas and Malik are partners and that Beatrice is still alive somewhere.
7	"The Case of the Two Corners"	Tricia Brock	Melissa Bubnic	4 March 2026
Following a tunnel confrontation in Paris, Sherlock survives emergency surgery after being shot – a wound accidentally inflicted by Xiao Wei, who had been targeting Silas. At his bedside, Xiao Wei reveals that the creeping death was originally developed and funded by the British government under Hodge, tested on her Chinese village, and then stolen and sold by Malik to Silas as a private buyer. The group forms an uneasy alliance: Xiao Wei will help track Silas in exchange for the right to exact her own justice. Moriarty decodes the cryptic phrase "two corners" – a reference to Napoleon's bicorne hat and a Paris brasserie – with the help of the Folies girls and the family runs a confidence scheme there to reach Silas's intermediary, Kasgarli. Intercepting Kasgarli's telegram, they learn Silas is in Constantinople. There, Sherlock privately meets his father, who confirms Beatrice is alive and present in the city and agrees to exchange her for Xiao Wei, but the woman produced at the exchange is not Beatrice. Xiao Wei escapes after a failed attempt on Silas's life. Sherlock and Mycroft are held at gunpoint by the real Beatrice, revealed to have been masquerading as Edie, Hodge's assistant.
8	"The Case of Beatrice Holmes"	Tricia Brock	Matthew Parkhill	4 March 2026
The revelation that Beatrice Holmes is alive and has been raised as Silas's secret operative forms the centrepiece of the finale. Held captive in Constantinople, Sherlock and Mycroft learn that Silas fabricated a story about Cordelia's dangerous madness to justify committing her to an asylum and spiriting Beatrice away as a child. Mycroft secretly contacts the British government and brokers a deal to buy the nerve agent exclusively from Silas, securing the brothers' release. After escaping and reuniting with Xiao Wei, Sherlock deduces a hidden passage in Silas's study that exposes his smuggling network and the full scope of the weapons programme – rockets designed to disperse the creeping death en masse. The group tracks Silas to his secret factory in Afshin via mountain tunnels; Beatrice, having accepted the truth about her father, helps destroy the facility, while Xiao Wei kills Professor Malik in vengeance for her murdered village. Sherlock prevents Beatrice from executing Silas, who jumps to his death. Xiao Wei returns home. Moriarty is revealed to have secretly retained the missing portion of Malik's equation, positioning himself as a dangerous independent power.

== Production ==
Development of a television series adaptation of the Young Sherlock Holmes books written by Andy Lane was first reported in April 2024 with Hero Fiennes Tiffin starring as a young Sherlock Holmes and Guy Ritchie attached to the project as well. Amazon Prime Video ordered eight-episodes of the series in May 2024 to be executive produced by Inspirational Entertainment and Motive Pictures. The series was written by showrunner Matthew Parkhill, who also executive produces. Ritchie directs and executive produces alongside Lane, Simon Kelton, Ivan Atkinson, Simon Maxwell, Harriet Creelman, Dhana Gilbert, Colin Wilson and Marc Resteghini. Ritchie previously helmed two unrelated cinematic Holmes adaptations: Sherlock Holmes (2009) and Sherlock Holmes: A Game of Shadows (2011). The role of the nineteen-year-old Holmes is played by Hero Fiennes Tiffin, who had previously worked with Ritchie on The Ministry of Ungentlemanly Warfare.

In June, Fiennes Tiffin's uncle Joseph Fiennes was cast as Sherlock's father, alongside Natascha McElhone as his mother. In July, Zine Tseng, Colin Firth and Dónal Finn joined the cast. Max Irons was seen filming scenes in late August, and he was revealed to be playing Mycroft Holmes shortly afterwards.

Filming of the series began in the United Kingdom in July 2024. Scenes were filmed in Bristol. In 2024, filming took place in Spain (specifically Jerez, Cádiz and Seville), and Cardiff, Wales. Filming on the series wrapped in late February 2025.

In April 2026, Amazon Prime Video renewed the show for a second series, with Ritchie set to direct the first episode. The show's success led executive producer Marc Resteghini to extend their overall deal with Amazon MGM Studios. Filming of the second series is underway in Palermo and Caccamo, Sicily, Italy. In July, Olivia Williams, Sophie Skelton, Indira Varma, and Aidan Gillen were announced to have joined the main cast for the second season, while Tseng, Acar, Firth and Joseph Fiennes were confirmed not to return.

== Release ==
All eight episodes of Young Sherlock premiered on 4 March 2026 on Amazon Prime Video. The trailer for the series, which was released on 5 February 2026, set a new record for the most watched Amazon Prime Series trailer in its first seven days. On 9 February, a screening of the first episode was held in New York City. On 17 February, a screening of the first two episodes was held in Mexico City. On 24 February, a screening of the first episode was held in London.

== Reception ==
=== Critical response ===
On the review aggregator website Rotten Tomatoes, the series holds an approval rating of 84%, based on 50 reviews, with an average rating of 7.1/10. The website's critics consensus reads: "Young Sherlock doesn't aim to recreate Conan Doyle's work, rather, it takes pride in its liberal adaptation, delivering Guy Ritchie's signature blend of precise entertainment, sly style, and ingratiating characters". Metacritic, which uses a weighted average, gave a score of 65 out of 100, based on 20 critics, indicating "generally favorable" reviews. While Tiffin received praise for his performance as Sherlock Holmes, some critics felt that Finn's portrayal of James Moriarty stole the spotlight, with him considered the show's breakout character.

=== Accolades ===
Year	Award	Category	Nominee(s)	Result	Ref.
2026	Astra TV Awards	Best Book to Screen Series	Young Sherlock	Nominated	
2026	Golden Trailer Awards	Best Drama Trailer for a TV/Streaming Series	"Mystery" (Amazon MGM Studios / Tiny Hero)	Nominated	
2026	Golden Trailer Awards	Best Drama TV Spot – TV/Streaming Series	"Name of the Game" (Amazon MGM Studios / Tiny Hero)	Nominated	
2026	Location Managers Guild International Awards	Outstanding Locations in a Period TV Series	Young Sherlock	Nominated	
2026	Primetime Creative Arts Emmy Awards	Outstanding Title Design	Scott Bell, Henry Chang, Christoph Gabathuler, Lexi Gunvaldson, Ronnie Koff, Charlie Proctor, Min Shi, and Elizabeth Steinberg	Pending	
2026	Set Decorators Society of America TV Awards	Best Achievement in Décor/Design of a One Hour Period Series	Barbara Herman-Skelding and Tom Burton	Nominated	
