= A Matter of Time (upcoming film) =

- Directed by: Harry Bradbeer
- Written by: Peter Byrne; Simon Beaufoy; Stephen Chbosky; Justin Haythe
- Produced by: Laurence Mark; Debra Hayward
- Starring: Ben Stiller; Nicholas Galitzine; Bella Maclean; Amy Wren; Emma Sidi; Toby Jones
- Production companies: Sony Pictures; Laurence Mark Productions
- Distributed by: Netflix
- Country: United States
- Language: English

A Matter of Time is an upcoming American fantasy drama film directed by Harry Bradbeer and written by Peter Byrne, Simon Beaufoy, Stephen Chbosky, and Justin Haythe. It stars Ben Stiller, Nicholas Galitzine, Bella Maclean, Amy Wren, Emma Sidi and Cecily Cleeve.

== Premise ==
The film follows an unlikely angel who is sent from heaven to convince a reclusive man to give up his life for the greater good. The man agrees, only for his impending death to trigger a new lease on life, and a romance that threatens to change the course of history.

== Cast ==
- Ben Stiller
- Nicholas Galitzine as Gary
- Bella Maclean as Elizabeth
- Amy Wren
- Emma Sidi
- Cecily Cleeve
- Toby Jones
- Anne Reid

== Production ==
In May 2026, it was reported that Harry Bradbeer would be directing a fantasy drama film from a script by Justin Haythe, Madeleine George, Peter Byrne, and Simon Beaufoy, and starring Ben Stiller, Nicholas Galitzine, and Bella Maclean. Principal photography began in early July 2026, in London, with Amy Wren, Emma Sidi, and Cecily Cleeve joining the cast.
