= Nicholas Ralph =

Scottish actor

- Born: 13 April 1990 (age 36); Cape Town, South Africa
- Education: Nairn Academy
- Alma mater: Royal Conservatoire of Scotland
- Occupation: Actor
- Years active: 2020–present
- Television: All Creatures Great and Small

Nicholas Ralph (born 13 April 1990 in Cape Town) is a Scottish actor. He plays James Herriot in the Channel 5 and PBS Masterpiece television series All Creatures Great and Small, a remake of the long-running BBC series.

== Early life ==
Ralph was born in Cape Town, South Africa and grew up in Nairn, a town in the Scottish Highlands. He had family in the US states of Georgia and Texas, and travelled to the United States a couple of times in childhood. As a young man, Ralph played association football, for Ross County from primary school until age 17, then for Nairn County under-19s.

He studied drama at Inverness College and then, at the Royal Conservatoire of Scotland. The audition for All Creatures Great and Small came two years after graduation. He had previous roles on stage which included plays with the Royal Conservatoire, the Citizens Theatre and National Theatre of Scotland. He also appeared on the BBC Radio Scotland production Kidnapped.

After graduating in 2017, he initially worked in live theatre with the Citizens Theatre for just under a year. His first lead role was with National Theatre of Scotland in a play called Interference. Before starting to film All Creatures Great and Small, Ralph did a tour with a Citizens Theatre/Wonder Fools production: 549: Scots of the Spanish Civil War.

== All Creatures Great and Small ==
For his role as veterinary surgeon James Herriot in All Creatures Great and Small, the actor required training in vet procedures for accuracy in the show. "Straight off the bat with our on-set vet adviser Andy Barrett, we were up close and personal with horses, sheep, kind of going through the procedures and things that we would be doing. Learning how to approach the animal and everything like that. Using the stethoscope on the cow's heart, then lungs, then stomach..." he later recalled.

Previously, Ralph had limited exposure to livestock: "I grew up in a small town in the Highlands of Scotland, and where we lived, there was our back garden, a fence, and then a field that was always full of cows and sheep... "

Much of the programme was filmed on location in all kinds of weather. The actor recalled, that "we were in Yorkshire during winter and autumn, and it was freezing, with long, cold, dark days and rainy days, sometimes, so if you had people that were downers, it could really bring everyone down. But we were very fortunate—we had a great group that really pushed each other on and kept each other's spirits high."

Although the author of the Herriot books, Alf Wight, had a "soft, lilting Scottish accent," according to Christopher Timothy, who played Herriot in All Creatures Great and Small (1978), the actor was instructed to keep his speech "neutral" for universality when the BBC series was being filmed. That did not apply to Nicholas Ralph when filming the 2020 series for Channel 5; he used his genuine Scottish accent.

== Filmography ==
| Year | Title | Role | Notes |
|---|---|---|---|
| 2020–present | All Creatures Great and Small | James Herriot | TV series |
| 2021 | The Most Reluctant Convert | C. S. Lewis (young man) | Film |
| 2022 | Prey for the Devil | Father Raymond | Film |
| 2024 | Outlander | Jeremiah "Jerry" Walter MacKenzie | TV series |
| 2026 | Grantchester | Rev. John Planer | TV series |
