= Maxim Ays =

English actor

- Education: Guildford School of Acting (BA)
- Occupation: Actor
- Television: Sanditon

Maxim Ays is a British film and television actor.

== Career ==
Ays graduated from the Guildford School of Acting in 2020. In 2021, he appeared in CBBC comedy series Still So Awkward. In 2022, he could be seen in the second series of British period drama Sanditon as Captain William Carter. That year, he also appeared as Reverend Candy in the second series of comedy drama The Larkins alongside Joanna Scanlan and Bradley Walsh.

He portrayed Felix on Boarders reprising the role in the second and third series. His television appearances also include Doctor Who in 2024 as Lord Galpin in the episode Rogue. He could be seen in the tenth series of long-running detective series Grantchester in 2025.

In 2025, he joined the cast of the second series of Disney+ series Rivals.

== Filmography ==
Key
†	Denotes works that have not yet been released

Year	Title	Role	Notes
2021	Still So Awkward	Seb	12 episodes
2022	Sanditon	Captain William Carter	6 episodes
2022	The Larkins	Reverend Candy	6 episodes
2024-	Boarders	Felix	10 episodes
2024	Doctor Who	Lord Galpin	Episode: "Rogue"
2025	Grantchester	Eric	1 episode
2025	Truth & Treason†	Gerhard	Film
2026	Rivals	Sebbie Carlisle	Series 2

== Theatre ==
Year	Title	Role	Writer	Director	Venue
2026	Game of Thrones: The Mad King	Ser Jaime Lannister	Duncan Macmillian	Dominic Cooke	Royal Shakespeare Theatre, Stratford-Upon-Avon
