= Noises Off =

1982 play written by Michael Frayn

- Poster for the 2001 Broadway revival
- Original language: English
- Written by: Michael Frayn
- Characters: Garry Lejeune; Dotty Otley; Lloyd Dallas; Belinda Blair; Frederick Fellowes; Brooke Ashton; Tim Allgood; Selsdon Mowbray; Poppy Norton-Taylor
- Subject: Play within a play
- Genre: Comedy

Premiere
- Date: 1982
- Place: Lyric Theatre, London

Noises Off is a 1982 farce by the English playwright Michael Frayn.

Frayn conceived the idea in 1970 while watching from the wings a performance of The Two of Us, a farce that he had written for Lynn Redgrave. He said, "It was funnier from behind than in front, and I thought that one day I must write a farce from behind." The prototype, a short-lived one-act play called Exits, was written and performed in 1977. At the request of his associate, Michael Codron, Frayn expanded this into what would become Noises Off.

It takes its title from the theatrical stage direction indicating sounds coming from offstage.

== Characters of Noises Off ==
- Lloyd Dallas: The director of a play-within-the-play, Nothing On. Temperamental, exacting and sarcastic. Involved with both Brooke and Poppy.
- Dotty Otley: A middle-aged television star who is not only the top-billed star but also one of the play's principal investors. Dating the much younger Garry.
- Garry Lejeune: The play's leading man, a solid actor who is completely incapable of finishing a sentence unless it is dialogue. Constantly stutters and ends sentences with "you know..." Dating Dotty and prone to jealousy.
- Brooke Ashton: A young, inexperienced actress from London. She pays no attention to others, either in performance or backstage, and persists in her role as scripted regardless of any interruption or mayhem. She is always losing her contact lenses, without which she is blind. Part of the Lloyd–Poppy–Brooke love triangle.
- Frederick (Freddie) Fellowes: Has a serious fear of violence and blood, both of which give him nosebleeds. Well-meaning, but lacks confidence and is rather dim-witted.
- Belinda Blair: Cheerful and sensible, a reliable actress and the company's de facto peacemaker. Something of a gossip, and a bit two-faced. Has a rather protective attitude towards Freddie.
- Selsdon Mowbray: An elderly, half-deaf "pro" with a long, storied career and a drinking problem. If he is not in sight while rehearsing, the stage crew must find him before he finds anything alcoholic.
- Poppy Norton-Taylor: Assistant Stage Manager and understudy to the female roles. Emotional, skittish and over-sensitive. Part of the Lloyd-Poppy-Brooke love triangle and, by act two, pregnant with Lloyd's baby.
- Tim Allgood: The over-worked and easily flustered Stage Manager, who must understudy, fix the set and run Lloyd's errands on top of his usual duties.

== Characters of the play-within-the-play, Nothing On ==
- Mrs. Clackett (Dotty): The Cockney housekeeper for the Brents' home. A hospitable, though slow-witted and slow-moving, chatterbox.
- Roger Tramplemain (Garry): An estate agent looking to let Flavia's and Philip's house.
- Vicki (Brooke): A girl Roger is attempting to seduce (or perhaps a girl trying to seduce Roger). Works for the tax authorities.
- Philip Brent (Freddie): Lives out of the country with his wife Flavia to avoid paying taxes and is on a secret visit.
- Flavia Brent (Belinda): Philip Brent's wife. She is dependable, though not one for household duties.
- Burglar (Selsdon): An old man in his seventies, breaking into the Brents' house.
- Sheikh (Freddie): Interested in renting the house.

== Plot ==
Each of the three acts of Noises Off contains a performance of the first act of a play within a play, a sex farce called Nothing On. The three acts of Noises Off are each named "Act One" on the contents page of the script, though they are labelled normally in the body of the script, and the programme for Noises Off will include, provided by the author, a comprehensive programme for the Weston-super-Mare run of Nothing On, including spoof advertisements (for sardines) and acknowledgments to the providers of mysterious props that do not actually appear (e.g. stethoscope, hospital trolley, and straitjacket). Nothing is seen of the rest of Nothing On except for the ending of its Act 2.

Nothing On is the type of farce in which young women run about in their underwear, men drop their trousers, and many doors continually bang open and shut. It is set in "a delightful 16th-century posset mill", modernised by the current owners and available to let while they are abroad; the fictional playwright is appropriately named Robin Housemonger.

Act One is set at the dress rehearsal at the (fictional) Grand Theatre in Weston-super-Mare. It is midnight, the night before the first performance and the cast are hopelessly unready. Baffled by entrances and exits, missed cues, missed lines, and bothersome props, including several plates of sardines, they drive Lloyd, their director, into a seething rage and back several times during the run.

Act Two shows a Wednesday matinée performance one month later, at the Theatre Royal in Ashton-under-Lyne. (Designed by Frank Matcham in 1891, the Theatre Royal, Ashton-under-Lyne was demolished in 1963.) In this act, the play is seen from backstage, providing a view that emphasises the deteriorating relationships between the cast. Romantic rivalries, lovers' tiffs and personal quarrels lead to offstage shenanigans, onstage bedlam and the occasional attack with a fire axe.

Act Three depicts a performance near the end of the ten-week run, at the (fictional) Municipal Theatre in Stockton-on-Tees. Relationships between the cast have soured considerably, the set is breaking down and props are winding up in the wrong hands, on the floor, and in the way. The actors remain determined at all costs to cover up the mounting chaos, but it is not long before the plot has to be abandoned entirely and the more coherent characters are obliged to take a lead in ad-libbing towards some sort of end.

Much of the comedy emerges from the subtle variations in each version as character flaws play off each other off-stage to undermine on-stage performance, with a great deal of slapstick. The contrast between players' on-stage and off-stage personalities is also a source of comic dissonance.

== Production history ==
The play premièred at the Lyric Theatre, Hammersmith, London in 1982, directed by Michael Blakemore and starring Patricia Routledge, Paul Eddington, and Nicky Henson. It opened to excellent reviews and shortly after transferred to the Savoy Theatre in the West End, where it ran until 1987 with five successive casts. It won the Evening Standard Award for Best Comedy.

On 11 December 1983, a production directed again by Blakemore and starring Dorothy Loudon, Victor Garber, Brian Murray, Jim Piddock, Deborah Rush, Douglas Seale, and Amy Wright opened on Broadway at the Brooks Atkinson Theatre, where it ran for 553 performances. It earned Tony Award nominations for Best Play and for Blakemore, Rush, and Seale, and won a Drama Desk Award for Outstanding Ensemble.

Noises Off has become a staple of both professional theatre companies and community theatres on both sides of the Atlantic. On 5 October 2000, the National Theatre in London mounted a revival, directed by Jeremy Sams and starring Patricia Hodge, Peter Egan and Aden Gillett, that ran for two years, transferring to the Piccadilly Theatre in the West End on 14 May 2001 with Lynn Redgrave and Stephen Mangan replacing Hodge and Egan, respectively. Sams' production transferred to Broadway, again at the Brooks Atkinson Theatre, on 1 November 2001, with Patti LuPone, Peter Gallagher, Faith Prince, T. R. Knight, and Katie Finneran. The production was nominated for a Tony and Drama Desk Award as Best Revival of a Play, and Finneran was named Best Featured Actress by both groups.

Frayn has repeatedly rewritten the play over the years. The last revision was in 2000 at the request of Jeremy Sams. There are numerous differences between the 1982 and 2000 scripts. Some new sequences have been added (e.g., an introduction to Act Three, in which Tim, the Company Stage Manager, and Poppy, the Assistant Stage Manager, make simultaneous apologies – the former in front of the curtain, the latter over the PA – for the delay in the performance). Other sequences have been altered or cut entirely. References that tend to date the play (such as Mrs. Clackett's to the Brents having colour television) have been eliminated or rewritten.

A London production ran from 3 December 2011 to 10 March 2012 at The Old Vic, directed by Lindsay Posner and starring Jonathan Coy, Janie Dee, Robert Glenister, Jamie Glover, Celia Imrie, Karl Johnson, Aisling Loftus, Amy Nuttall and Paul Ready. This production transferred to the Novello Theatre in the West End from 24 March to 30 June 2012, and then toured Britain and Ireland with a different cast.

A Broadway revival, produced by Roundabout Theatre Company, started in previews at the American Airlines Theatre on 17 December 2015, and opened on 14 January 2016. The cast featured Andrea Martin (Dotty Otley), Megan Hilty (Brooke Ashton), Campbell Scott (Lloyd Dallas), Jeremy Shamos (Frederick Fellowes), David Furr (Garry Lejeune), Rob McClure (Tim Allgood), Daniel Davis (Selsdon Mowbray), Kate Jennings Grant (Belinda Blair), and Tracee Chimo (Poppy Norton-Taylor). The revival ran its limited run through 13 March 2016, extending by one week due to popular demand. The production was nominated for 2016 Tony Awards for Best Revival of Play, Best Featured Actress for Martin and Hilty, Best Featured Actor for Furr, and Best Costume Design.

An Australian production was mounted at the Queensland Performing Arts Centre, where it ran for three weeks as part of Queensland Theatre Company's 2017 season. After the season with QTC, the show then transferred to the Playhouse Theatre, where it ran from 8 July to 12 August with Melbourne Theatre Company. The cast featured Simon Burke as Lloyd Dallas, Emily Goddard as Poppy Norton-Taylor, Libby Munro as Brooke Ashton, Ray Chong Nee as Garry Lejeune, Hugh Parker as Frederick Fellowes, James Saunders as Timothy Allgood, Louise Siversen as Dotty Otley, Steven Tandy as Selsdon Mowbray and Nicki Wendt as Belinda Blair. In Australia it has been produced many times and in many places from 1982 to 2017.

The play returned to the Lyric Theatre, Hammersmith in a new production directed by Jeremy Herrin from 27 June to 3 August 2019, starring Lois Chimimba, Jonathan Cullen, Debra Gillett, Amy Morgan, Enyi Okoronkwo, Lloyd Owen, Daniel Rigby, Simon Rouse and Meera Syal. The production transferred to the Garrick Theatre in London's West End with Sarah Hadland, Richard Henders, Lisa McGrillis, Anjli Mohindra and Adrian Richards replacing Gillet, Cullen, Morgan, Chimimba and Okoronkwo from the Hammersmith run from 27 September 2019 until 4 January 2020.

A 40th anniversary production directed by Lindsay Posner ran at the Phoenix Theatre, London from January to March 2023 (following a short UK tour in autumn 2022) starring Felicity Kendal, Matthew Kelly, Tracy-Ann Oberman, Alexander Hanson, Sasha Frost, Joseph Millson, Jonathan Coy Pepter Lunkuse and Hubert Burton. The production also began a UK tour at the Birmingham Rep with Kelly, Liza Goddard, Simon Shepherd, Dan Fredenburgh, Lisa Ambalavanar, Nikhita Lesler, Simon Coates, Lucy Robinson and Daniel Rainford from September 2023. The production also returned to the West End at the Theatre Royal Haymarket with Kendal, Coy and Hanson returning, joined by Mathew Horne, Tamzin Outhwaite, Oscar Batterham and James Fleet from September to December 2023.

== Notable casts ==
Role	West End	Broadway	First West End Revival	First Broadway Revival	Second London Revival	Second Broadway Revival	Third West End Revival	Fourth West End Revival	Fifth West End Revival
Role	1982	1983	2001		2011	2016	2019	2023	2023
Lloyd Dallas	Paul Eddington	Brian Murray	Peter Egan	Peter Gallagher	Robert Glenister	Campbell Scott	Lloyd Owen	Alexander Hanson	Alexander Hanson
Dotty Otley	Patricia Routledge	Dorothy Loudon	Patricia Hodge	Patti LuPone	Celia Imrie	Andrea Martin	Meera Syal	Felicity Kendal	Felicity Kendal
Garry Lejeune	Nicky Henson	Victor Garber	Aden Gillett	Thomas McCarthy	Jamie Glover	David Furr	Daniel Rigby	Joseph Millson	Mathew Horne
Brooke Ashton	Rowena Roberts	Deborah Rush	Natalie Walter	Katie Finneran	Amy Nuttall	Megan Hilty	Lisa McGrillis	Sasha Frost	Sasha Frost
Freddie Fellowes	Tony Matthews	Paxton Whitehead	Jeff Rawle	Edward Hibbert	Jonathan Coy	Jeremy Shamos	Richard Henders	Jonathan Coy	Jonathan Coy
Belinda Blair	Jan Waters	Linda Thorson	Susie Blake	Faith Prince	Janie Dee	Kate Jennings Grant	Sarah Hadland	Tracy-Ann Oberman	Tamzin Outhwaite
Selsdon Mowbray	Michael Aldridge	Douglas Seale	Christopher Benjamin	Richard Easton	Karl Johnson	Daniel Davis	Simon Rouse	Matthew Kelly	Matthew Kelly
Poppy Norton-Taylor	Yvonne Antrobus	Amy Wright	Selina Griffiths	Robin Weigert	Aisling Loftus	Tracee Chimo	Anjli Mohindra	Pepter Lunkuse	Pepter Lunkuse
Tim Allgood	Roger Lloyd-Pack	Jim Piddock	Paul Thornley	T. R. Knight	Paul Ready	Rob McClure	Adrian Richards	Hubert Burton	Oscar Batterham

=== Notable replacements ===
==== West End 1982 ====
- Lloyd: Benjamin Whitrow.
- Dotty: Phyllida Law.
- Freddie: John Quayle.
- Belinda: Gabrielle Drake.
- Selsdon: Robert Flemyng.
- Tim: Robert Bathurst

==== Broadway 1983 ====
- Lloyd: Paul Hecht.
- Dotty: Carole Shelley.
- Freddie: Patrick Horgan.
- Belinda: Concetta Tomei.
- Selsdon: George Hall.
- Tim: Christian Clemenson.

==== First West End Revival 2001 ====
- Lloyd: Philip Franks, Nicholas Jones.
- Dotty: Selina Cadell, Cheryl Campbell, Lynn Redgrave.
- Brooke: Pandora Clifford.
- Freddie: Paul Bradley, Derek Griffiths.
- Belinda: Julia Deakin.
- Selsdon: Sylvester McCoy, Malcolm Tierney.

==== First Broadway Revival 2001 ====
- Lloyd: Leigh Lawson.
- Dotty: Jane Curtin.
- Garry: Paul Fitzgerald.
- Brooke: Kali Rocha.
- Belinda: Kaitlin Hopkins.

== Film adaptation ==
In 1992, the play was adapted for the screen by Marty Kaplan. The film, directed by Peter Bogdanovich and starring Carol Burnett, Michael Caine, Christopher Reeve, John Ritter, Nicollette Sheridan, Denholm Elliott, Julie Hagerty, Mark Linn-Baker and Marilu Henner, received mixed reviews, with many critics noting it was too much of a theatrical piece to translate well to the screen. Frank Rich, who had called it "the funniest play written in my lifetime", wrote that the film is "one of the worst ever made".

== Reception ==
Noises Off has been described as "the funniest farce ever written", and "the classic farce". It has been highly influential, possibly inspiring The Play That Goes Wrong series.

The Guardian and Chris Addison have praised its structure.

== Awards and honours ==
=== First Broadway production ===
Year	Award	Category	Nominee	Result
1984	Tony Award	Best Play		Nominated
1984	Tony Award	Best Featured Actor in a Play	Douglas Seale	Nominated
1984	Tony Award	Best Featured Actress in a Play	Deborah Rush	Nominated
1984	Tony Award	Best Direction of a Play	Michael Blakemore	Nominated
1984	Drama Desk Award	Outstanding New Play		Nominated
1984	Drama Desk Award	Outstanding Director of a Play	Michael Blakemore	Won
1984	Drama Desk Award	Outstanding Set Design	Michael Annals	Nominated
1984	Drama Desk Award	Outstanding Ensemble Performance		Won
1984	Outer Critics Circle Award	Outstanding Director	Michael Blakemore	Won

=== 2001 Broadway revival ===
Year	Award	Category	Nominee	Result
2002	Tony Award	Best Revival of a Play		Nominated
2002	Tony Award	Best Featured Actress in a Play	Katie Finneran	Won
2002	Drama Desk Award	Outstanding Revival of a Play		Nominated
2002	Drama Desk Award	Outstanding Featured Actress in a Play	Katie Finneran	Nominated
2002	Outer Critics Circle Award	Outstanding Revival of a Play		Nominated
2002	Outer Critics Circle Award	Outstanding Featured Actress in a Play	Katie Finneran	Won
2002	Outer Critics Circle Award	Outstanding Director of a Play	Jeremy Sams	Nominated
2002	Drama League Award	Distinguished Performance of a Revival		Nominated

=== 2016 Broadway revival ===
Year	Award	Category	Nominee	Result
2016	Tony Award	Best Revival of a Play		Nominated
2016	Tony Award	Best Featured Actor in a Play	David Furr	Nominated
2016	Tony Award	Best Featured Actress in a Play	Andrea Martin	Nominated
2016	Tony Award	Best Featured Actress in a Play	Megan Hilty	Nominated
2016	Tony Award	Best Costume Design of a Play	Michael Krass	Nominated
2016	Drama Desk Award	Outstanding Featured Actor in a Play	David Furr	Nominated
2016	Drama Desk Award	Outstanding Featured Actress in a Play	Megan Hilty	Nominated
2016	Drama League Award	Distinguished Revival of a Play		Nominated
