= The Most Reluctant Convert =

The Most Reluctant Convert: The Untold Story of C.S. Lewis
- Film poster
- Directed by: Norman Stone
- Written by: Norman Stone; Max McLean (original stage play)
- Produced by: Ken Denison; Matthew Jenkins
- Starring: Max McLean; Nicholas Ralph; Eddie Ray Martin; Richard Harrington; Amy Alexander; Tom Glenister; David Shields; Hubert Burton; David Gant
- Cinematography: Sam Heasman
- Edited by: Fergus MacKinnon
- Music by: Craig Armstrong
- Production companies: 1A Productions; Fellowship for Performing Arts
- Distributed by: Trafalgar Releasing
- Release date: November 3, 2021 (United States)
- Running time: 73 minutes
- Country: United Kingdom United States
- Language: English
- Box office: $1.205 million (Nov. 3, 2021 showing)

The Most Reluctant Convert: The Untold Story of C.S. Lewis is a 2021 British biographical drama film written and directed by Norman Stone, based on the 2016 stage play, C.S. Lewis on Stage: The Most Reluctant Convert, by Max McLean (which itself was based on Lewis' 1955 memoir Surprised by Joy). It is about the life and conversion of British writer, lay theologian, and Christian apologist C. S. Lewis, author of The Chronicles of Narnia series. The film stars McLean, Nicholas Ralph, Eddie Ray Martin, Richard Harrington, Amy Alexander, and Tom Glenister.

The film was released in the United States on November 3, 2021, and in the United Kingdom on November 7, 2021.

Director Norman Stone had previously directed 1985's Shadowlands, a film about the relationship between C. S. Lewis and American author Joy Davidman, for which he won a BAFTA for Best Single Drama (along with producer David M. Thompson).

== Cast ==
- Max McLean as older C. S. Lewis
  - Nicholas Ralph as mid Lewis
  - Eddie Ray Martin as young Lewis
- Richard Harrington as Albert Lewis
- Amy Alexander as Flora Lewis
- Tom Glenister as J. R. R. Tolkien
- David Shields as Hugo Dyson
- Hubert Burton as Owen Barfield
- David Gant as W. T. "The Great Knock" Kirkpatrick

== Production ==
=== Funding ===
The film was financed by Christian theater company, Fellowship for Performing Arts, and film producer Matthew Jenkins served as an executive producer.

=== Filming ===
Filming was originally planned to be done around 2023 to 2024, but when certain COVID-19 restrictions lifted in the United Kingdom, filming instead began earlier in September 2020. The film was shot in three weeks, from September 21 to October 9, 2020. Filming took place in Oxford, England, with some scenes being shot at Oxford University.

== Release ==
=== Theatrical ===
Trafalgar Releasing released the film initially as a one night only event on November 3, 2021 in over 400 cities in North America and grossed over US$1.205 million. It became the second per-screen average (behind 2021's Dune).

Due to positive reactions from audiences, it was given a theatrical run extending to November 18, 2021.

On November 7, 2021, the film released as a special event in the United Kingdom. According to Box Office Mojo, the film earned $47,944 in the United Kingdom.

=== Home media ===
The film was released digitally onto Apple TV and Google Play, and physically on Blu-ray and DVD.

=== Critical reception ===
The film has received positive reviews from critics, especially for McLean, who's been universally praised for his performance as older C. S. Lewis.

Film critic and commentator, Michael Medved gave the film a four out of four star rating. Alan Ng of Film Threat gave the film an eight out of ten stars, praising Stone's direction, and called the scenes covering Lewis' life, "remarkable." He concludes stating, "...it solidly presents the case Lewis made regarding the existence of God and why Jesus Christ is the right guy to follow. The film is perfect for fans of Lewis and the religiously curious." Doug Van Pelt of HM Magazine gave a positive review, calling it, "a delightful journey." He goes on to praise the cinematography, and the scenes between Lewis, Tolkien, and Dyson. Michael Foust of Crosswalk.com praised the performances of Ralph, Glenister, and Martin, and called it, "riveting and excellent", and "inspiring". Bob Hoose of Plugged In gave the film a positive review, calling it, "thoughtful, [and] inviting," "anything but dry," and "a nuanced experience worth having. And sharing."

Emma Fowle of Premier Christianity praised the film, calling it, "not your stereotypical Christian movie," and praised the philosophical discussions (calling them "beautifully portrayed"). However, while she said Ralph plays student Lewis "admirably," she called his Scottish accent "less convincing at times," and stated "asking a 31-year-old man to attempt to look 16 is a stretch..." She ended the review on a positive note, stating, "The events depicted might have happened over 80 years ago, but they remain... both pertinent and relatable. ... his is a testimony that will inspire both old and young. This is an intellectually robust conversion story, told with honesty, humour and warmth."

Mark Burger of Yes! Weekly praised the film overall, but criticized the subtitle, calling it a "misnomer," and its runtime, saying that it "limit[s] its overall scope." He concluded his review, stating, "[The film] is a worthy, if occasionally sketchy, tribute. [It's]… conveyed in modest, unforced terms, which is to its credit, and much of that credit is due to Max McLean."
