= Bella Maclean =

British actress (born 1997)

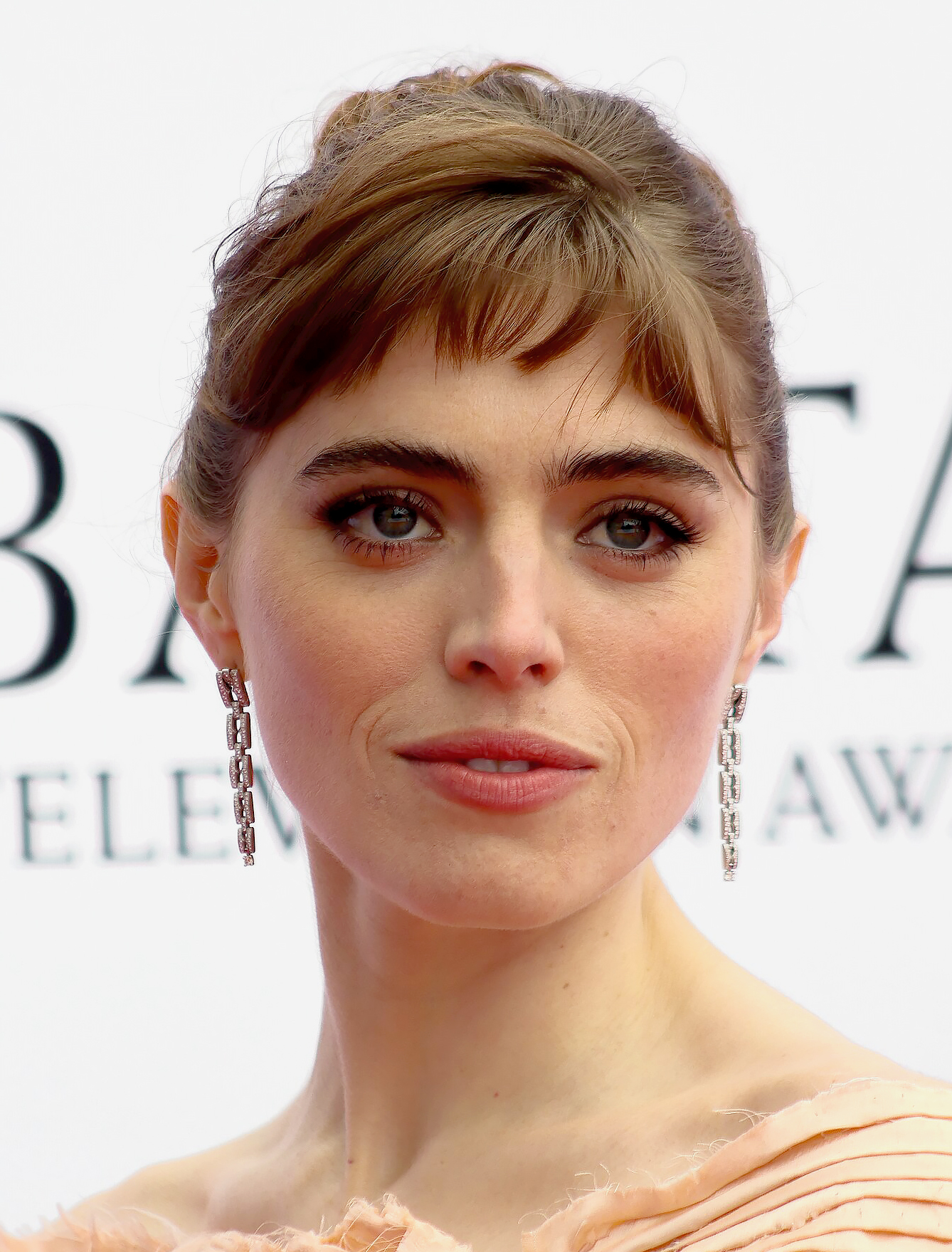
- Maclean at the 2026 British Academy Television Awards
- Born: Arabella Georgina Lucy Maclean; 14 November 1997 (age 29); New York City, U.S.
- Education: Guildhall School of Music and Drama
- Years active: 2018–present

Bella Maclean (born 14 November 1997) is an American / British actress. On television, she appeared in the fourth season of the Netflix series Sex Education (2023) and the Disney+ series Rivals (2024). She has also appeared on stage.

She was named a 2025 Screen International Star of Tomorrow.

== Early life and education ==
Bella Maclean was born on 14 November 1997 in New York City to British parents. She has two older sisters. She spent her early childhood in New York for her parents' work, before they returned to England and settled in East Sussex when she was 10.

In 2020, Maclean graduated from the Guildhall School of Music and Drama with a Bachelor of Arts in Acting.

== Career ==
=== Stage ===
Maclean made her professional stage debut as Martha in the 2021 London revival of Spring Awakening at the Almeida Theatre. Her performance was described as "an eye-catching turn as Martha" by theatre critic Fiona Mountford. The production was directed by Rupert Goold, with Laurie Kynaston and Amara Okereke leading. A filmed performance of the production was screened at cinemas in the United Kingdom in November 2023.

She returned to the stage in 2024 as Bella Wilfer in the National Theatre's London Tide, a musical adaptation of the Charles Dickens novel Our Mutual Friend. The production was directed by Ian Rickson, adapted by Ben Power, and music by Powers and PJ Harvey. While the play and score received mixed reviews, Maclean's performance was positively reviewed. The official cast recording was released in October.

=== Film and television ===
In 2023, Maclean made her television debut in two episodes of the BBC One police procedural Silent Witness. She joined the cast of the Netflix comedy-drama Sex Education for its fourth and final season as Jem. She has also appeared in the short films Dragged Up and La La Means I Love You.

In 2024, Maclean had her breakout role in the Disney+ adaptation of Jilly Cooper's Rivals. She portrayed Agatha 'Taggie' O'Hara, the overlooked daughter of Declan (Aidan Turner) and Maud (Victoria Smurfit) who struggles with dyslexia while trying to pursue culinary dreams. The show was met with widespread critical acclaim, while Maclean's scenes with love interest Rupert Campbell-Black (Alex Hassell) were described as "engagingly complex". She reprised the role in the programme's second series, which premiered in May 2026; in a review, Den of Geek's Lucy Baugher described Maclean's Taggie as 'the quiet heart' of Rivals.

Maclean was cast as a lead role in Ray Panthaki's directorial debut film In Starland. The film follows a middle-aged man struggling to break free from the confines of his small town until he meets a group of bold young artists that transform his perspective. She is starring alongside Clarence Maclin, Marcus Scribner, and Maxwell Cunningham.

== Filmography ==
=== Film ===
Year	Title	Role	Notes
2018	La La Means I Love You	Tallulah	Short film
2023	Dragged Up	Amy	Short film
2023	Almeida on Screen: Spring Awakening	Martha	Filmed live performance
TBA	Hello & Paris †	TBA	Filming
TBA	A Matter of Time †	TBA	Filming

=== Television ===
Year	Title	Role	Notes
2023	Silent Witness	Sara Mendes	2 episodes
2023	Sex Education	Jem	6 episodes (season 4)
2024–present	Rivals	Agatha "Taggie" O'Hara	Main role

== Stage ==
Year	Title	Role	Director	Venue	Ref.
2021	Spring Awakening	Martha	Rupert Goold	Almeida Theatre, London	
2024	London Tide	Bella Wilfer	Ian Rickson	National Theatre, London	

== Discography ==
=== Cast recording ===
- 2024: London Tide (World Premiere Recording)

== Awards and nominations ==
Maclean was a finalist in the Josephine Hart Poetry Prize in 2019, when a student at Guildhall. The prize is awarded for reading a poem.

Year	Award	Category	Nominated work	Result	Ref.
2024	iTalk Telly Awards	Best Breakthrough	Rivals	Nominated	
2025	Edinburgh International Television Festival	Breakthrough Performance	Rivals	Nominated	
2025	Broadcasting Press Guild Awards	BPG Breakthrough	Rivals	Won	
