= Holly Cattle =

English actress (born 1997)

- Born: 1997 (age 28–29)
- Education: University of Bristol; Royal Conservatoire of Scotland
- Years active: 2021–present

Holly Cattle (born 1997) is an English actress. On television, she is known for her roles in the Amazon Prime series Young Sherlock and the Disney+ series Rivals (both 2026). She also appeared in the Sky One series COBRA (2023).

== Early life ==
Cattle grew up in Wandsworth, South West London. Cattle attended Wellington College, a boarding school in Berkshire. She completed a year-long foundation course at the Drama Centre London and went on to graduate with a Bachelor of Arts (BA) from the University of Bristol in 2020 and a Master of Arts (MA) in Acting (Classical and Contemporary) from the Royal Conservatoire of Scotland in 2021.

== Career ==
After graduating from drama school, Cattle made her professional London stage debut in Force Majeure at the Donmar Warehouse in 2022.

Cattle made her television debut as Ellie Sutherland in the third series of the Sky political thriller COBRA with Robert Carlyle in 2023, taking over the role from Marisa Abela. The following year, she appeared in episodes of the BBC drama Mr Loverman as Kriss and the Channel 5 detective series Dalgleish as Sally Jupp.

In 2026, Cattle had a main role in the Amazon Prime series Young Sherlock. Announced in 2025, she joined the cast of the Disney+ adaptation of Rivals for its second series as Perdita Macleod, Rupert Campbell-Black's (Alex Hassell) illegitimate daughter.

== Filmography ==
Year	Title	Role	Notes
2023	COBRA	Ellie Sutherland	6 episodes
2024	Mr Loverman	Kriss	1 episode
2024	Dalgleish	Sally Jupp	Episode: "Cover Her Face – Part 1"
2026	Young Sherlock	Edie	Main role
2026	Rivals	Perdita Macleod	

== Stage ==
Year	Title	Role	Notes
2022	Force Majeure	Skier	Donmar Warehouse
