= Angels Rush In =

1990 non-fiction work by Jilly Cooper

- Title page for Angels Rush In (1990)
- Author: Jilly Cooper
- Illustrator: Timothy Jacques; Paul Cox
- Publication date: 1990
- Publication place: United Kingdom
- Pages: 434 (paperback)
- Website: https://www.jillycooper.co.uk/books/angels-rush-in/

Angels Rush In: The Best of Her Satire and Humour is a 1990 collection of satirical writing by English author Jilly Cooper. Selected by Cooper, the work re-published material from her non-fiction books How to Stay Married, How to Survive from Nine to Five, Class, Men and Supermen, Women and Superwomen, Intelligent and Loyal, How to Survive Christmas, Turn Right at the Spotted Dog and The Common Years. The Daily Telegraph reviewed the hardback edition as "amiable prose from a shrewd social observer" and compared Cooper to journalist Jean Rook. In a 1991 review of the paperback the same newspaper described how it highlighted "the idiosyncrasies of middle class behaviour [with] a literary flourish".

== Synopsis ==
The collection is excerpted from nine of her books. Each section is prefaced with a new introduction by Cooper. The selection from How to Stay Married treats weddings, honeymoons, arguments and menstruation. Excerpts from How to Survive from Nine to Five include discussion on what it is like to be new in a workplace, hierarchies to be found then, social life at work and Christmas parties. Sections from Men and Supermen are focussed on dating and sex, with sections on bachelors and orgies. Similarly, excerpts from Women and Superwomen also discuss sex, but also cover mothers-in-law, hobbies and adultery. The section from Intelligent and Loyal lists Cooper's mongrel classification with photographs. Excerpts from How to Survive Christmas cover family life during Christmas dinner, Boxing Day and New Year's Eve. The selection from The Common Years is based on Cooper's diaries from 1974 and 1982 when she lived in Putney and regularly walked her dogs on Putney Common. Excerpts from Turn Right at the Spotted Dog focus on life in Gloucestershire, as well as articles from Cooper's column in The Mail on Sunday on topics such as teenage life, or attending cricket matches as a WAG.

== Background ==
The collection comprises Cooper's selection of excerpts from her non-fiction publications from the preceding twenty years, reflecting a period where she moved from Putney in London to Stroud in Gloucestershire. In the introduction Cooper discussed the reception of some the works excerpts are taken from, describing how she did not think How to Survive Christmas was good enough for her publisher to accept, and that How to Stay Married has multiple shortcomings. Similar views on her own work were repeated elsewhere, with Cooper describing herself as "smug" in her early books. The collection included previously commissioned illustrations by Timothy Jacques and Paul Cox, and well as photography by Graham Wood.

== Reception ==
Upon publication of the 1990 hardback, The Daily Telegraph described how the quality of the writing in the works excerpted was reflected in the length they were used in the collection, with Class and The Common Years most used. It went on to describe the work as "amiable prose from a shrewd social observer", but that this skill becomes overwhelmed by writing more similar to that of Jean Rook. The Manchester Evening News agreed that her diaries from Putney, The Common Years, were the funniest parts of the collection. The Bristol Evening Post described it as a "super collection" and praised Cooper's writing more widely for her honesty and recognition of her own shortcomings. In a review in the Huddersfield Daily Examiner, Jane Yelland stated that the compilation was a good introduction to Cooper's non-fiction for new readers, but those know her work "will have seen it all before". Yelland also questioned the motivations for the publication of the book, wondering whether Cooper had a tax bill to pay.

In review of the 1991 paperback, The Daily Telegraph reflected that the collection was at its best when it was "skewering the idiosyncrasies of middle class behaviour [with] a literary flourish". The same review described Cooper as "a national institution" in the same way as many of the aspects of Englishness that she was inspired by. The Manchester Evening News described Cooper as "Britain's best humorous female writer", but stressed that there were too many anecdotes about dogs.

In 1993, the Sydney Morning Herald described the collection as one for "dipping into rather than reading through at a sitting". Similarly it was termed as a "bedside book" by the Manchester Evening News. The collection is quoted in The Oxford Dictionary of Humorous Quotations, edited by Gyles Brandreth, and in Wise Women, compiled by Carol Mackenzie.
