= Tongue-in-cheek =

Idiom indicating humor or sarcasm

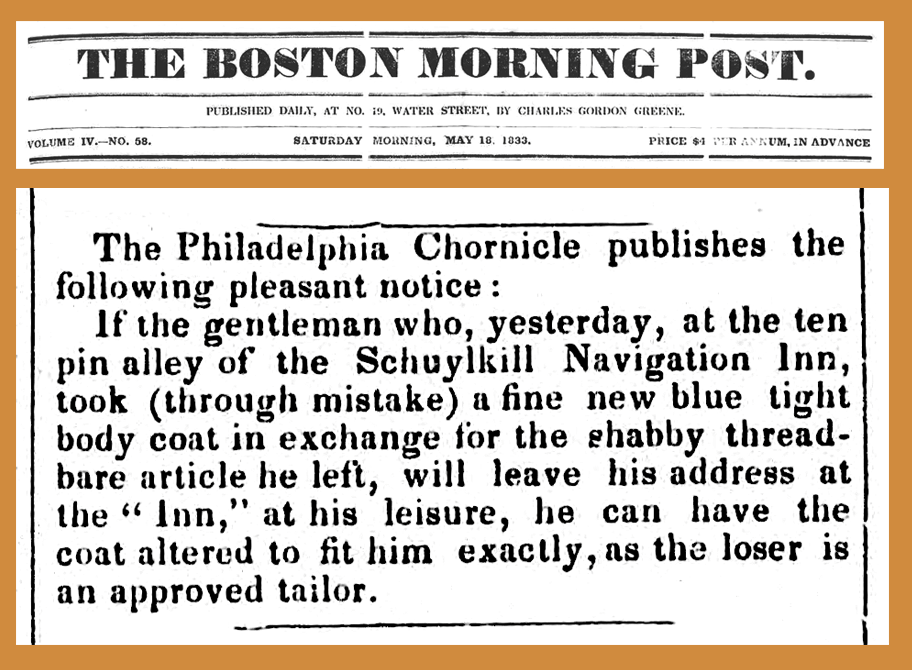
A newspaper clipping from 1833, in which a tailor whose coat was stolen from a bowling alley advertises an offer to alter the coat to fit the thief.

Tongue-in-cheek is an idiom that describes a humorous or sarcastic statement expressed in a serious manner.

== History ==
The phrase originally expressed contempt, but by 1842 had acquired its modern meaning. Early users of the phrase include Sir Walter Scott in his 1828 The Fair Maid of Perth.

The physical act of putting one's tongue into one's cheek once signified contempt. For example, in Tobias Smollett's The Adventures of Roderick Random, which was published in 1748, the eponymous hero takes a coach to Bath and on the way apprehends a highwayman. This provokes an altercation with a less brave passenger:

He looked back and pronounced with a faltering voice, 'O! 'tis very well—damn my blood! I shall find a time.' I signified my contempt of him by thrusting my tongue in my cheek, which humbled him so much, that he scarce swore another oath aloud during the whole journey.

The phrase appears in 1828 in The Fair Maid of Perth by Sir Walter Scott:

The fellow who gave this all-hail thrust his tongue in his cheek to some scapegraces like himself.

It is not clear how Scott intended readers to understand the phrase. The more modern ironic sense appeared in a poem in The Ingoldsby Legends (1842) by the English clergyman Richard Barham, in which a Frenchman inspects a watch and cries:

'Superbe! Magnifique!' / (with his tongue in his cheek)

The ironic usage originates with the idea of suppressed mirth—biting one's tongue to prevent an outburst of laughter.

Other literary works described using the term include Bella by Jilly Cooper.

== See also ==
- Slang dictionary
