= Memorandum =

Written message, typically in a professional setting

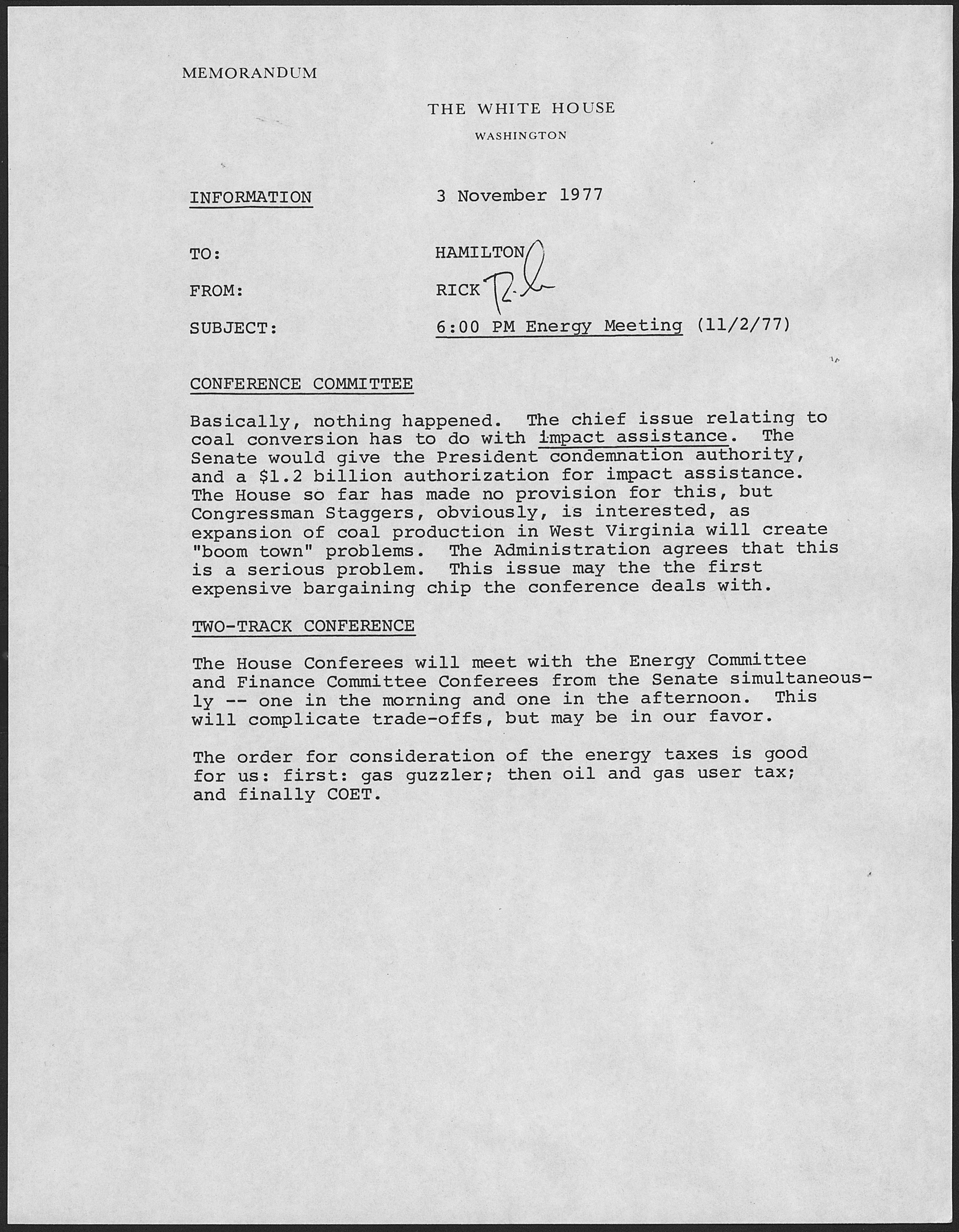
Memo written by a White House staff member during the tenure of Jimmy Carter as US president

A memorandum (pl.: memorandums or memoranda; from the Latin memorandum, "(that) which is to be remembered"), also known as a briefing note, is a written message that is typically used in a professional setting. Commonly abbreviated memo, these messages are usually brief and are designed to be easily and quickly understood. Memos can thus communicate important information efficiently in order to make dynamic and effective changes.

In law, a memorandum is a record of the terms of a transaction or contract, such as a policy memo, memorandum of understanding, memorandum of agreement, or memorandum of association. In business, a memo is typically used by firms for internal communication, while letters are typically for external communication.

Other memorandum formats include briefing notes, reports, letters, and binders. They may be considered grey literature. Memorandum formatting may vary by office or institution. For example, if the intended recipient is a cabinet minister or a senior executive, the format might be rigidly defined and limited to one or two pages. If the recipient is a colleague, the formatting requirements are usually more flexible.

== Policy briefing note ==
A specific type of memorandum is the policy briefing note (alternatively referred to in various jurisdictions and governing traditions as policy issues paper, policy memorandums, or cabinet submission amongst other terms), a document for transmitting policy analysis into the political decision making sphere. Typically, a briefing note may be denoted as either “for information” or “for decision”.

=== Origins of term ===
The origins of the term lie in legal “briefs” and the derivative “military briefings”. The plural form of the Latin noun memorandum so derived is properly memoranda, but if the word is deemed to have become a word of the English language, the plural memorandums, abbreviated to memos, may be used. (See also Agenda, Corrigenda, Addenda).

=== Purpose ===
There are many important purposes of a memorandum. Bringing notice to problems, and helping to solve a problem through clear and concise communication are two. Memos support decision making and to “help (or sometimes influence) a decision-maker to make a better decision in a particular problem situation than he might otherwise have made without the analysis”. Other purposes that the briefing note can serve include: conveying information; informing decisions, making a request, providing a response to a question, making a suggestion, presenting an informal report, proposing a solution to a problem, or documenting a reference for future use. Memorandums can be used to make brief appeals or give suggestions. These actions in a brief paper can help significantly expedite business actions to make a positive impact in an organization.

=== Structure ===
As the communication mechanism of the policy analysis process, the briefing note should provide a coherent synopsis of a policy problem, identify different policy options for addressing the problem, articulate opposing perspectives and advocate a recommended option. The typical structure for a briefing note includes a description of the proposed policy; relevant background information; a discussion of key considerations (including implementation concerns, financial considerations, stakeholder impacts, and possible unanticipated consequences), a summary of arguments for and against the policy and a recommended decision. Policy documents that start with a proposal and assemble an argument for that position are more accurately referred to as a government white paper. A government green paper which raises a policy option and is meant to open a dialogue on the proposal is more similar in tone to a briefing note than is a white paper.

A memorandum's concise format is relatively standardized in order to ensure accessibility for any reader. It opens with a heading including a "To," "From," "Date," and "Subject". A break in the text is then followed by an opening paragraph, which typically describes the purpose of the memorandum. Context is then added to the document, followed by a section outlining specific actions. Examples could include "You asked that I look at..." or "To determine the best method of promoting the new fall line, I will...". Actions are followed by discussion, which is typically the longest part of a memorandum, before concluding the message.

=== Quality criteria ===
There is no universal standard for a briefing note, but it is generally understood to be a concise, coherent summary of a public policy problem with a clearly articulated logic for following a recommended course of action. ”Next to a political nose, and a logical brain, the most important skill of the good treasury [person] resides in [their] fine drafting hand. The concise, coherent and penetrating note is the final expression of all other talents.” In many governance settings based on the Westminster system, policy analysts are expected to analyze the issue and write the briefing note from a neutral civil service perspective. However, the briefing note “for decision” must contain a recommendation, acknowledging that “to say anything of importance in public policy requires value judgments, which must be explained and justified”.

In addition to keeping a proper memo concise and easily comprehensible, there are a few other important features. The style and tone of a memo should always be kept professional, no matter who the audience may be. This etiquette ensures that no matter who reads the message, it is presented professionally and respectfully. It is common to also see briefing notes with numbered paragraphs, in order to create an efficient and well-organized paper. Since entering the digital age, signatures are not commonly seen at the end of a memo. However, when a briefing note was handwritten in earlier years, they typically included a signature. Today it is still acceptable to sign or initial a memo if the writer wishes to.

== In popular culture ==
The satirical book How to Survive from Nine to Five by English author Jilly Cooper has been cited in research into office culture, for example on how to write a memo.

== See also ==
- Bench memorandum
- Email
- Grey literature
- Memorandum of agreement
- Memorandum of association
- Memorandum of conversation
- Memorandum of understanding
- Mémoire
- Presidential memorandum
- Private Placement Memorandum
- Note taking
