= Harriet (novel) =

1976 novel by Jilly Cooper

- Author: Jilly Cooper
- Language: English
- Genre: Romance
- Set in: 20th-century England
- Publication date: 1976
- Publication place: United Kingdom
- Preceded by: Bella
- Followed by: Octavia
- Website: https://www.jillycooper.co.uk/books/harriet/

Harriet is a 1976 romance novel by English author Jilly Cooper. The eponymous lead, Harriet falls pregnant while at university and leaves to have the baby after the father breaks up with her. She moves to Yorkshire where she is employed by screenwriter Cory Erskine as a nanny to his two children; they ultimately realise they are in love, decide to become a couple and combine their families. Barbara Cartland reviewed the novel, describing it as "melodramatic" and denied that it belonged to the wider romance genre. In 2018 Red selected the work as one of their top ten Cooper novels. In 2013 The Telegraph reported that the novel was being adapted into a musical by Eva Rice, novelist and daughter of Tim Rice.

== Plot ==
A brief affair between Oxford University students Harriet Poole and Simon Villiers leads to Harriet becoming pregnant. Dumped by Simon and leaving university, she has the baby, who she calls William – despite Simon insisting she abort the embryo. Harriet moves to Yorkshire where she is employed by screenwriter Cory Erskine as a nanny to his two children, which means that she can work and look after her own child. Cory's ex-wife temporarily returns seeking a reconciliation, and his brother Kit also visits and shows sexual interest in Harriet. Simon also appears in Yorkshire, seeking Harriet and his son out. Ultimately Harriet and Cory realise they are in love, decide to become a couple and combine their families.

== Characters ==
- Harriet Poole
- Simon Villiers
- Cory Erskine
- Noel Erskine

== Reception ==
Published in 1976, the novel is 220 pages. Upon publication in 1976, writing in the Daily Express, romance novelist Barbara Cartland reviewed the novel, agreeing with its cover description that it was "melodramatic". Although she admitted the book was well-written, Cartland disliked the characterisation and took umbrage with a plot where the woman gets pregnant and has a baby while unmarried. Cartland also argued against Harriet being part of a wider tradition of romance genre: she describes it as both "physical and spiritual" and stresses its emphasis on beauty. This was in contrast to Harriet, where Cartland stated:

"Yet nothing is uglier and less romantic than the characters typified in this novel, with every woman in it lusting after sex, and the men understandably contemptuous of them."

— Barbara Cartland

Reviewing the novel in 1978, The Bracknell Times described the novel as "affable corn with some very amusing passages" and praised how its characters seemed more realistic than usual for Cooper's writing. An episode in the book where one of the characters suffers from meningitis was inspired by her own experience with the hospitalisation of her son Felix. Mary Kenny, writing in 1988 in The Sunday Telegraph, described how a reader wrote to her and described the novel "as the most anti-abortion tract she had ever read", since the protagonist does not have an abortion and by not doing so meets the love of her life.

Writing in 2018, Harriet's awkward character was praised by Sarra Manning writing in Red. The same year, Red selected the novel as one of their top ten Cooper novels. In 2023 Irish journalist Emily Hourican stated she'd choose Harriet and the other novels in Cooper's romance series as her specialist subject on Mastermind. In 2024, Tanya Gold described Simon Villiers as an "idiot" in her precis of Cooper's romance series.

== Adaptations ==
In 2007 a television adaptation of the novel was mooted. This was suggested as one of a four-part series focussing on one of Cooper's romance novels; the only episode to be filmed was the first, Octavia.

In 2013 The Telegraph reported that the novel was being adapted into a musical by Eva Rice, novelist and daughter of Tim Rice. This would be the first of Cooper's works to be performed as a musical. At the time Cooper hoped that Dominic West would play Cory Erskine. In 2021 music from the under-development adaptation was played by Elaine Paige on BBC Radio 2.
