= Teacher, Teacher =

Teacher, Teacher may refer to:

== Books ==
- Teacher, Teacher!, first book in the teacher novels series by Jack Sheffield#Books, 2007

== Music ==
- "Teacher, Teacher" (Johnny Mathis song), written by Al Stillman and Robert Allen, 1958
- "Teacher, Teacher", single by Gene Chandler, written by Keni Lewis and Eugene Dixon, 1968
- "Teacher, Teacher", single by The Maytals, written by Toots Hibbert, 1971
- "Teacher, Teacher" (Rockpile song), written by Eddie Phillips and Kenny Pickett, 1980
- "Teacher, Teacher" (38 Special song), 1984
- "Teacher Teacher" (AKB48 song), 2018
- "Teacher, Teacher", single by Jinjer from Micro EP, 2019

== Television ==
- "Teacher, Teacher", February 5, 1969 episode of Hallmark Hall of Fame, 21st Primetime Emmy Awards#Programs winner
- "Teacher, Teacher", December 2, 1990 episode on List of Parker Lewis Can't Lose episodes
- "Teacher, Teacher", November 16, 1996 episode of Bailey Kipper's P.O.V.#Transmission details
