= Between the Covers =

Between the Covers may refer to:

- Between the Covers (album), a cover album by Wet Wet Wet frontman Marti Pellow
- Between the Covers (book), an anthology of writing by Jilly Cooper
- Between the Covers (radio program), a program on the Radio One network of the Canadian Broadcasting Corporation
- Between the Covers (TV programme) a BBC talk show programme stylized as a book club with celebrities talking about their favourite book
