= How to Survive from Nine to Five =

1970 non-fiction book

- First edition cover
- Author: Jilly Cooper
- Language: English
- Genre: Non-fiction, satire
- Publisher: Eyre Methuen
- Publication date: 1970
- Publication place: UK
- Preceded by: How to Stay Married
- Website: https://www.jillycooper.co.uk/books/how-to-survive-from-nine-to-five/

How to Survive from Nine to Five is a 1970 book by English author Jilly Cooper. The humorous book draws on Cooper's experiences of working in offices, prior to her writing career. The book was described by journalist Veronica Groocock as "an amusing picture of traditional office hierarchy".

== Background ==
The books draws on Cooper's experiences in the 27 office jobs she had prior to working as a full-time journalist. It was serialised in the Liverpool Echo.

== Reception ==
Upon publication the Hull Daily Mail described it as a "breezy little book" full of useful advice, in Cooper's "imitable style - wit and wisdom tempered with just a little malice". The Vancouver Sun reviewed the book in 1971, highlighting the range of office-related topics it covered, such as interviews, memos, management consultants and the Office Christmas Party. The Sydney Morning Herald described how it "gave a very awful picture of the facts of office life", again drawing on multiple examples from the text.

The book was republished in 1988, along with its companion volume How To Stay Married. A Western Daily Press reviewer described how it had "dated less" than the latter and that it was still witty, but that it was written in an era "where women are subservient". A review in the Reading Evening Post described how the book would make a good stocking-filler, and that the stereotypes within it were still apt, although the 'office deb' described in 1970, would in 1988 be the 'office yuppie'. Excerpts from the book are included in her 1990 writing collection Angels Rush In.

== Analysis ==
The book was described by journalist Veronica Groocock as "an amusing picture of traditional office hierarchy". It has also been cited in research into office culture, for example on how to write a memo, and quoted in works on management.
