= Bella (novel) =

1976 novel by Jilly Cooper

- Author: Jilly Cooper
- Language: English
- Genre: Romance
- Set in: 20th-century England
- Publication date: 1976
- Publication place: United Kingdom
- Preceded by: Emily
- Followed by: Harriet
- Website: https://www.jillycooper.co.uk/books/bella/

Bella is a 1976 romance novel by English author Jilly Cooper. The work is based on a novella written by Cooper called Collision. Auberon Waugh recommended the novel highly for summer reading, describing how his emotions were "powerfully engaged on behalf of the heroine". In 2016 Penguin Books recommended the novel as a good introduction to Cooper's wider oeuvre. In 2007 a television adaptation of the novel was mooted.

Similarity between passages from Bella and some in The Dud Avocado have been pointed out. Cooper has described the plagiarism as accidental.

== Plot ==
Bella Parkinson is an actress, who is courted by the wealthy Rupert Henriques after he watches her perform on stage. Attracted by his money and the security it could potentially provide, Bella takes the relationship with him seriously, and is invited to meet Rupert's wider family. They include Rupert's cousins Laszlo and Chrissie. Whilst Laszlo warns Bella away from Rupert, it also becomes clear that Chrissie is in love with Rupert. To complicate matters, a former lover of Bella's, a man called Steve Benedict, arrives on the scene, threatening to reveal Bella's past to the Henriques family at the same time as charming them.

When a valuable family diamond goes missing, Bella is arrested. While she is in jail, Chrissie is abducted, and once Bella is bailed she too is kidnapped and joins Chrissie. The kidnappers treat both sisters cruelly, apart from one, who ultimately raises the alarm. After being seriously threatened at gunpoint, Chrissie and Bella are released. Rupert had meanwhile realised he loved Chrissie, and Laszlo, Bella. Steve turned out to be a conman in cahoots with the kidnappers.

== Characters ==
- Bella Parkinson
- Rupert Henriques
- Laszlo Henriques
- Steve Benedict
- Chrissie Henriques

== Background ==
The work is based on a novella written by Cooper called Collision, which was serialised in the magazine 19 in 1969. The publication date of the novel was delayed from May 1976 to the 28 June so that enough books could be printed to meet the advance demand of suppliers.

== Reception ==
On publication the Western Daily Press described the novel as a schoolgirl-ish, with the reviewer comparing it books his sister used to read. The Observer review expressed disappointment, describing how of the good quality jokes got lost in the prose. Auberon Waugh reviewed the novel upon publication and recommended it highly for summer reading, describing how his emotions were "powerfully engaged on behalf of the heroine". He went on to say:

One can scold Jilly Cooper for using quite so many cliches quite so shamelessly, but these devices - the undeclared love, the attractive rotter, the saturnine masterful figure who wins through in the end - are only used so frequently because they work so well.

— Auberon Waugh, Bella won't let you down, Evening Standard, 6 July 1976, p.18

With the paperback release in 1977, the Bracknell and Ascot Times described the novel as "affable corn, easy reading with the odd giggle". However the review went on to say that Cooper's journalism was much better than this work of fiction. Black Country Evening Mail described the novel as "featherweight froth" with a "tongue-in-cheek" style. In contrast the Liverpool Daily Post described it as a modern romance.

In 2016 Penguin Books recommended the novel as good introduction to Cooper's wider oeuvre. Writing in Red magazine in 2018 journalist Sarah Manning described how she read the novel when she was younger she wanted to emulate "Bella's badass bitchery".

== Adaptation ==
In 2007 a television adaptation of the novel was mooted. This was suggested as one of a four-part series focussing on one of Cooper's romance novels; the only episode to be filmed was the first, Octavia.

== Plagiarism ==
Similarity between passages from Bella and some in The Dud Avocado by Elaine Dundy were noted, with Cooper describing how she was "mortified" but the plagiarism was accidental. Cooper explained that she had made notes on Dundy's work, but these notes had become confused with her own original thoughts. Cooper's book Emily faced the same criticism.

== Popular culture ==
The novel features in Village Teacher by Jack Sheffield as part of a chapter that features Cooper at a book signing.
