= Turn Right at the Spotted Dog =

1987 writing collection

- Author: Jilly Cooper
- Cover artist: Susan Hellard
- Language: English
- Genre: Journalism
- Publisher: Mandarin
- Publication date: 1987
- Pages: 176 (paperback)
- Website: https://www.jillycooper.co.uk/books/turn-right-at-the-spotted-dog/

Turn Right at the Spotted Dog is a 1987 collection of articles and interviews by the English writer Jilly Cooper. It comprises 26 pieces that were first published by The Mail on Sunday. In the preface to the collection Cooper describes how she uses the collection to "repair the ravages of newspaper sub-editors". The Telegraph also listed it shortly after Cooper's 2025 death as one of five works by the author that are 'must-reads'.

== Synopsis ==
The collection comprises a selection of Cooper's journalism that were first published in The Mail on Sunday. It includes 26 articles, both interviews and features, on topics that include middle-age, life in the Cotswolds, jury service, adolescence and hunt balls, as well as interviews with Neil Kinnock, David Gower, Princess Michael of Kent, Lord Hailsham, Beverley Harrell and Margaret Thatcher.

== Background ==
First published in 1987, it was Cooper's first edited collection to be published for five years. In the preface to the collection Cooper describes how she uses the collection to "repair the ravages of newspaper sub-editors ... and sometimes ill-considered cuts" to pieces, including the profile on Princess Michael of Kent.

== Reception ==
Described by the Northern Echo as "embracing a diverse range of subjects", the Huddersfield Examiner drew attention to the range of material in the book, citing Cooper's piece on Brighton's nudist beach as featuring alongside a major interview with Neil Kinnock. The same review described the book as "amusing [with] an upper-class sort of humour" which included "funny but hurtful comments" on a range of celebrity figures, but concluded saying it was "a must for Cooper fans everywhere". The South Wales Argus agreed describing the articles as "sometimes whacky, sometimes funny, usually interesting". The Sydney Morning Herald described the collection as "a handbook for nouveau-rustics" citing differences in entertaining between London houses and in the countryside. Punch highlighted her interview with David Gower as a key piece in the collection. The book continued to feature in the top ten best-selling paperback charts in September 1988.

== Recognition ==
In an article in The Guardian after the author's death in 2025, one reader described this collection as "perceptive" with "clarity of expression". The Telegraph also listed it during the same period as one of five works by Cooper that are 'must-reads'. The book has been compared to Cooper's other collections Class and Angels Rush In. A quotation from the work also appeared in The Mammoth Book of Comic Quotes.
