= Jolly Super Too =

1973 writing collection

- 1982 edition cover
- Author: Jilly Cooper
- Language: English
- Genre: Non-fiction
- Publisher: Eyre & Methuen, Corgi Books
- Publication date: 1973
- Publication place: United Kingdom
- Preceded by: Jolly Super
- Followed by: Jolly Superlative
- Website: https://www.jillycooper.co.uk/books/jolly-super-too/

Jolly Super Too is a 1973 collection of humorous journalism by English author Jilly Cooper. A follow-on volume from Jolly Super, the volume received largely positive reviews, with Cooper's humour and sharp observations particularly praised. The volume covers a wide range of topics, from Eton to an Eisteddfod via bingo and rally driving.

== Background ==
Following from Jolly Super, the book is a second collection that comprises a selection of 33 examples of Cooper's fortnightly columns from The Sunday Times. The humorous collection includes journalistic articles on a range of topics, including shooting, rally driving, New York, Moscow, Christmas cards and bingo. First published in 1973, the volume was republished by Corgi Books in 1981.

== Reception ==
In its 1973 review of the collection The Guardian described how Cooper's writing is now well-known for its punning, but that can disguise her skill as a writer. It praised Cooper's hard work, journalism and her knowledge of literature, citing her visits to Moscow, Eton on the Fourth of June, Wimbledon, and Glyndebourne. The South Wales Argus reviewed the volume and described how Cooper had an "unerring eye for the spurious in society" and "a delightful spirit of enquiry". It notes the range of locations and topics covered, including bingo and shooting, and states that "whether you loathe her ... she is well-worth reading and always provocatively stimulating".

The Lancashire Telegraph described the books as "a happy blend of wit and common sense". The Huddersfield Daily Examiner noted in its review that Cooper regularly published books in time for Christmas trade, but also showed concern that her writing did not seem to develop despite "being sharply observant and hot about the sex thing". The Birmingham Evening Mail compared Cooper to Mick McManus as someone the public loved to hate, and stated that the book would deliver "a snigger a minute" to readers, including a excerpt about Cooper judging Miss United Kingdom.

The Evening Standard described how Cooper had an "appraising mind" and recommended excerpts in the volume on her visit to both a Soho strip club and an Eisteddfod. Reviewing the 1982 paperback publication The Gazette described how the volume contains some good phrasing, but that Cooper could improve her best work further.
