= Emily (novel) =

1975 novel by Jilly Cooper

- Author: Jilly Cooper
- Language: English
- Genre: Romance
- Publication date: 1975
- Publication place: United Kingdom
- Followed by: Bella
- Website: https://www.jillycooper.co.uk/books/emily/

Emily is a 1975 novel by English author Jilly Cooper. It is the first novel in her romance series. The central character is Emily who marries an artist called Rory after a one-night stand. The relationship sours when Rory appears to be having sex with his sister and Emily miscarries Rory's baby. Ultimately, they reunite. One review described the novel "as though a Nancy Mitford plot and cast of characters had been appropriated by Barbara Cartland". The novel was adapted for Thames Television in 1976, starring Gemma Craven.

Similarities between the novel and The Dud Avocado by Elaine Dundy were made public in 1993. Cooper has said the plagiarism was unintentional and that she felt "mortified" about it.

== Plot ==
Emily has a dull fiancée, who is a potential Conservative Party candidate, but she swept away by artist Rory Balniel after meeting him at a cocktail party. After what was meant to be a one-night-stand, Rory proposes to Emily, they swiftly marry and then travel to a remote Scottish island where he lives. His family also live there too, including his illegitimate sister Marina and her brother Finn. Finn and Emily dislike each other on first meeting, and Rory too detests Finn, who is a doctor on the island. Thrown together, Emily and Rory's relationship crumbles and he is violent towards her. It also becomes clear to Emily that Marina and Rory are more than siblings, and she catches them having sex together.

Later in the novel it becomes clear that Rory and Marina are not biologically related and they run away to Edinburgh together. At the same time Emily tries to leave the island, falls down the stairs and miscarries the baby she was pregnant with. Whilst in hospital Finn is her doctor, and they kiss several times. Ultimately Emily leaves Rory and flees to London. This coincides with his first major exhibition. Emily visits the gallery where the steward tells her how devastated Rory is that his wife has left him. Emily goes to his hotel where he proclaims his love for her and rejection of Marina.

== Characters ==
- Emily Balniel
- Rory Balniel
- Marina McLean
- Finn McLean

== Reception ==
The work was Cooper's first romance novel. Elizabeth Berridge in The Daily Telegraph reviewed the novel as a "light-hearted try to bring the romantic novel up to date" and she both praised and decried Cooper's use of humour. Francis King in the Sunday Telegraph described the novel positively "as though a Nancy Mitford plot and cast of characters had been appropriated by Barbara Cartland". Tony Butler, reviewing the novel in the Evening Herald, noted that the style was similar to that of Cooper's journalism and compared it to works by Denise Robins.

In 2009 Jane McLoughlin analysed Emily (and also Prudence, the titular heroine of another Cooper romance) as "unsophisticated ugly ducklings". Twenty years later, in 2023, the work was listed by the Sunday Independent as one of four "classic" Cooper novels. The same year Emily Hourican stated that she would choose Emily and the other novels in the romance series as her specialist subject on Mastermind.

== Adaptation ==
The novel was adapted by Eleanor Bron for Thames Television in 1976 as part of a six-part romance series. Directed by Alastair Reid, it was broadcast on 6 April 1977. The episode starred Gemma Craven as the eponymous Emily and Ronald Pickup as Rory. Filmed on the island of Barra, other actors included Una McLean, Brian Oulton and James Greene. It was the fifth episode in the series, bringing it into the 1970s from its previous period settings. Other works adapted in the series were Moths by Ouida, Three Weeks by Elinor Glyn, The Black Knight by Ethel M. Dell, High Noon by Ruby M. Ayres and House of Men by Catherine Marchant.

== Plagiarism ==
Similarities between Emily and other novels have been noted. In 1976, Auberon Waugh mentioned similarity between this novel and The Devil's Club by Georgette Heyer, during a review for Cooper's subsequent novel Bella. In 1993 further similarities between Emily and another novel became known: some passages appeared to have been lifted from The Dud Avocado by Elaine Dundy. Cooper described how this was unintentional, and felt "mortified" that her notes on the novel had somehow got confused with her original work.
