= The Common Years =

Diaries by Jilly Cooper published in 1984

- Author: Jilly Cooper
- Illustrator: Paul Cox
- Cover artist: Colin Thomas (paperback)
- Language: English
- Genre: Diaries
- Set in: 20th-century Britain
- Published: 1984
- Publisher: Methuen
- Publication place: United Kingdom
- Pages: 320
- Website: https://www.jillycooper.co.uk/books/the-common-years/

The Common Years is a 1984 anthology of diary entries by English author Jilly Cooper. The diary covers a period of Cooper's life from 1972 to 1982. During this decade, Cooper and her family lived in Putney, London, and she regularly walked her dogs on Putney Common and Barnes Common. The book became a bestseller and was praised for its observations of the natural world but criticised by some for its portrayals of some of Cooper's neighbours.

== Background ==
Between 1972 and 1982, Cooper and her family lived in Putney, and during this period Cooper kept a series of diaries recording life in the area. From these published diaries, it seems that central to Cooper's life there were her daily walks on Putney Common, accompanied by her dogs, Maidstone and Fortnum. The diaries were initially intended as preparatory work for her novel Riders. Cooper recorded her children growing older, the changing seasons and the untimely deaths of both dogs. She also stated that she was very sad to leave the area. There is some similarity between events in the diaries and some of her journalism, since she drew on the same incidents for her Mail on Sunday column. The book was illustrated by Paul Cox. A future volume about life in Gloucestershire was planned for publication in the early 1990s, with the working title The Gloucestershire Years.

== Reception ==
The book became a bestseller. Upon publication The Sunday Telegraph praised Cooper's botanical descriptions that have "minute and loving observation" and praises the illustrations of Putney Fair, Barnes graveyard and Beverley Brook. Bolton News produced a double review of this work and Riders, published in the same year, describing this work as a "mixture of Joyce Grenfell and August Strindberg". The Sydney Morning Herald reviewed the book and described it as too dog-focussed, with relief in the form of brief references to politics and nature.

The Observer's review pointed out how the diaries could be viewed negatively by Cooper's neighbours. Describing how Cooper drew critically on the neighbourhood for her journalism, reviewer Hilary Spurling stated that the people of Putney might not look forward to this book, since it variously described people as unprepossessing, vulgar, snobbish and stingy. Spurling described the antics of Cooper's dogs as a "vicious reign of terror", citing the fact they had killed another dog and three cats. This negative approach to her Putney neighbours was repeated in a 1999 review in The Sunday Telegraph, however it continued to praise her nature writing, including "flowers described as though they were catwalk models".

== Analysis ==
In a feature on Putney's popularity in 1988, The Observer stated that Cooper had "immortalised" the area through her diaries. By 1991 the book was described as having wildlife central to its themes. In 1996 Cooper's The Common Years was discussed as part of a publishing boom in diary-writing, typified by Alan Bennett, Alan Clark and Kenneth Williams.

In a 2010 interview Cooper reflected that many people viewed The Commons Years as her best book. Penguin Books recommended it as one of five works best placed to start reading Jilly Cooper with; the others are Bella, Riders, Rivals and Animals in War. In 2018 Red magazine listed it as one of Cooper's top ten books. In 2024 Cooper described the book as her favourite of her own publications.
