= Elaine Dundy =

American writer and actress (1921–2008)

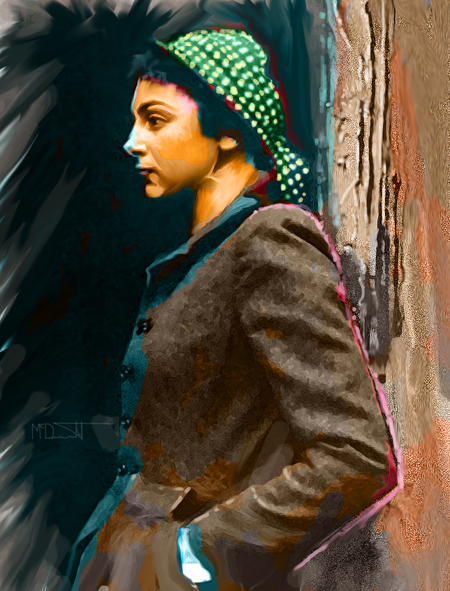
Jim McDermott's portrait of Dundy

Elaine Rita Dundy (née Brimberg; August 1, 1921 – May 1, 2008) was an American novelist, biographer, journalist, actress and playwright.

== Early life ==
She was born Elaine Rita Brimberg in New York City. Her Polish Jewish immigrant father, Samuel Brimberg, was an office furniture manufacturer and a violent bully. Her mother was of Latvian Jewish descent; she was the daughter of a multimillionaire manufacturer and inventor. Dundy was one of three sisters; a sibling was Shirley Clarke, the independent filmmaker. Dundy grew up in a Park Avenue home where she was educated by a governess, though she eventually attended high school, where her boyfriend Terry was the son of playwright Maxwell Anderson. Later, they met again and almost married.

A habituée of New York nightclubs from the age of 15, she met the exiled Dutch painter Piet Mondrian, who wished to be taught how to jitterbug. An honors graduate from Sweet Briar College in Sweet Briar, Virginia, she studied acting at the Jarvis Theatre School in Washington with future star actors Rod Steiger, Tony Curtis and others, and in the Dramatic Workshop was taught by Erwin Piscator.

Dundy's controlling father insisted she live at home while in New York, but she calculated that her monthly allowance would allow her to live in Paris, France, for a short time. At the end of World War II, she traveled to Europe, first to live in Paris, dubbing French films, then settled in London, where she performed in a BBC radio play. In 1950, she met the theater critic Kenneth Tynan, and two weeks later, they began living together. They married on January 25, 1951, had a daughter Tracy (born on May 12, 1952, London), and became part of the theatrical and film elite of London and Hollywood.

== Radio and television ==
Among her roles as an actress, she appeared in "The Scream," a 1953 episode of the TV series Douglas Fairbanks, Jr. Presents, and a BBC-TV production of Dinner at Eight as a maid: "One of those small parts an actress can do absolutely nothing with except look as pretty as possible, act as naive as possible and stay out of the way of the knives." Dundy was heard in different roles on Radio Luxembourg's Harry Lime dramas, directed by Orson Welles. In 1955, Dundy and Tynan appeared together on camera, hosting the "Madrid Bullfight" episode of Around the World With Orson Welles, the documentary series Welles made for Associated-Rediffusion, a contractor for Britain's ITV commercial network.

== Books ==
In 1958, Dundy published her first novel The Dud Avocado, loosely based on her experiences in Paris. It reached the top of the bestseller lists. Some content was plagiarised by British author Jilly Cooper in her novels Emily and Bella. She received a letter from an admirer:

Dear Mrs Tynan, I don't make the habit of writing to married women, especially if the husband is a dramatic critic, but I had to tell someone (and it might as well be you since you're the author) how much I enjoyed The Dud Avocado. It made me laugh, scream and guffaw (which incidentally is a great name for a law firm). If this was actually your life, I don't know how on earth you got through it. Sincerely, Groucho Marx.

Tynan disapproved of Dundy's writing vocation despite having forecast success, because it distracted attention from himself; Dundy, however, had seen it as a means to save their marriage. Around this time, Tynan started to insist on flagellating his wife, with the threat of his own suicide if she refused. Drugs, alcohol, and extramarital affairs by both parties resulted in the marriage becoming fraught, and it was dissolved in 1964. In 1962, she was a writer for the BBC's satirical That Was the Week That Was. Dundy attempted to cure herself of addictions from 1968 to 1976, though according to her daughter, she struggled with drugs and alcohol for half a century. Dundy lived mainly in New York after her divorce. In addition to novels and short stories, she wrote for The New York Times. She wrote books on the actor Peter Finch, the city of Ferriday, Louisiana, and Elvis Presley.

As part of her research for the Presley book, Dundy moved from her luxurious suites in London and New York to live for five months in Presley's birthplace of Tupelo, Mississippi. Elvis and Gladys was first published by Macmillan in 1985 (reissued in 2004 by the University Press of Mississippi). The Boston Globe hailed it as "nothing less than the best Elvis book yet". Kirkus Reviews described it as "the most fine-grained Elvis bio ever."

== Later life ==
Dundy maintained a home in London until 1986, and then moved to Los Angeles to be near her daughter. By then, Tracy was a costume designer; she is married to film director Jim McBride. Dundy's autobiography, Life Itself!, was published in 2001. In the same year, Kenneth Tynan's diaries, written in his last decade, were published. Their daughter had helped to have the book issued. It led to a two-year split between the two women, until Dundy re-entered rehabilitation once more. Her 1964 novel, The Old Man and Me, was reissued in 2005 by the feminist publishing company Virago Press, and that same year, she wrote the introduction for Virago's reprint of Daphne du Maurier's 1932 novel I'll Never Be Young Again.

Tracy Tynan's memoir Wear and Tear, published in the United States in 2016, deals with Tynan's trying experiences of her parents.

== Death ==
In Dundy's final years, she was losing her eyesight due to macular degeneration. She died of a heart attack in Los Angeles, California, on May 1, 2008, aged 86. She is buried at Westwood Village Memorial Park Cemetery.

== Bibliography ==
=== Novels ===
- The Dud Avocado (1958)
- The Old Man and Me (1964)
- The Injured Party (1974)

=== Biographies ===
- Finch, Bloody Finch: A Biography of Peter Finch (1980)
- Elvis and Gladys (1985)
- Ferriday, Louisiana (1991)
- Life Itself! (2001) (autobiography)

=== Plays ===
- My Place (1962)
- Death in the Country (1976) (in Vogue, 1974.)
- The Drowning (1976)

=== Articles ===
- "Hip, Beat & Square", The Observer, 4 December 1960
- "Memory in Spain", The Observer, 25 December 1960
- "Stanley Kubrick and Dr. Strangelove", Queen, 13 March 1963 (reprinted in Glamour, April 1964)
- "Reviewing Reviewing" (on the first issue of the New York Review of Books), The Spectator, 7 June 1963
- "Formentoracle", The Observer, 4 May 1964
- "Crane, Masters, Wolfe, etc. Slept Here" (on the Chelsea Hotel), Esquire, October 1964
- "What Means Tiny Alice?" (on Edward Albee), New York Herald Tribune, 31 January 1965
- "How to Succeed in the Theatre Without Really Being Successful", Esquire, May 1965
- "The Image in the Marketplace", Esquire, July 1965
- "Can a Simple Welsh Lass of Thirty-six Find Happiness with a Macedonian Rock-and-Roll Star of Twenty-four?", Esquire, December 1965
- [on Christopher Plummer], New York Herald Tribune, 26 December 1965
- Tom Wolfe Issue (letter), New York Review of Books 17 March 1966
- Tom Wolfe ... But Exactly, Yes! Vogue, April 1966
- [on Rosemary Harris], New York Herald Tribune, 10 April 1966
- "Vivien Leigh: On Interviewing a Star on a Wet Washington Day", Village Voice, 1966
- "Suddenly It's Fun", The Observer, 20 August 1967
- "Finding Out the Hard Way What It Means to Be Jewish", The (London) Times, 11 February 1976
- "Life Is All Ups and No Downs on This Carousel" (on Erik Erikson), The New York Times, 5 September 1976
- "Why Actors Do Better for Sidney Lumet", New York, 22 November 1976,
- Review of: Changing, by Liv Ullmann, The Saturday Review, 5 February 1977
- Review of: Haywire, by Brooke Hayward, The Saturday Review, 2 April 1977
- "Born to Please" (on Vivien Leigh), The New York Times, 22 May 1977
- Introduction to I'll Never Be Young Again, Daphne du Maurier, 2005

=== Short story ===
- "The Sound of a Marriage", Queen, 1960 or 1965? (reprinted, Cosmopolitan, February 1967)
