= Violets and Vinegar =

1980 dictionary of women's quotations

- Cover
- Editor: Jilly Cooper; Tom Hartman
- Language: English
- Subject: Women
- Genre: Dictionary of quotations
- Publisher: G. Allen & Unwin
- Publication date: 1980
- Publication place: United Kingdom
- Website: www.jillycooper.co.uk/books/violets-and-vinegar/

Violets and Vinegar: an Anthology of Women's Writings and Sayings is a 1980 dictionary of quotations by women edited by English author Jilly Cooper and editor Tom Hartman. The volume was conceived when Cooper and Hartman realised that most dictionaries of quotations were approximately 90% male in their content. The book was mostly reviewed positively, with critics praising the wide range of topics and authors included in it.

== Background ==
The volume was conceived when Cooper and Hartman realised that most dictionaries of quotations were approximately 90% male in their content. Hartman worked with Cooper's husband Leo, as an editor. The book is divided into 24 themes, including children, houses and friendship.

== Reception ==
Upon publication, the Evening Standard described the volume as a "perfect glossy bathside book: full of bubbles and old soap, yet worthy of many a dip". The reviewer, Bel Mooney, praised the book as a move towards gender equity, but also expresses some scepticism, since in her mind women are less represented because they have written less across time. The Eastern Daily Press also questioned who the audience for the book was and suggested that the quotations included were either too common or too obscure. The Arizona Republic reviewed the book as "delightful", comparing it to other dictionaries of quotations which are "usually 90 per cent male-inspired". It also referred to the wide range of women quoted, including both Queen Victoria and comedian Phyllis Diller. The Sydney Morning Herald described it as a "delicious collection" and recommended it as a Christmas present.

The Age described the book in 1982 as "an amusing anthology", selecting a quotation by Margaret Thatcher and one on artificial insemination as most memorable. In the same year the Houston Chronicle also reviewed the book, noting its focus on English writers was a weakness. The following year The Observer praised the range of voices in the book, citing quotations from Simone de Beauvoir, Enid Blyton, Germaine Greer and Gwen Raverat. A similar review by The Daily Times also noted the inclusion of sayings by Zsa Zsa Gabor and Willa Cather. Commenting on the volume in 1989, The Daily Gleaner also praised the anthology's wide-ranging content.
