= Elvis and Gladys =

1985 book by Elaine Dundy

- Author: Elaine Dundy
- Language: English
- Subject: Elvis Presley
- Genre: Biography
- Publication date: 1985
- ISBN: 1-57806-634-4

Elvis and Gladys (ISBN 1-57806-634-4) is a biography of rock and roll singer Elvis Presley by author and film industry insider Elaine Dundy. The book recounts Presley's early life, the role his mother Gladys played in his formative years, and his beginnings in recorded music and film.

The first hardcover edition was published in the United States in 1985 by MacMillan Publishing Company of New York. ISBN 0-02-553910-8. It was reissued in paperback in 2004 by the University Press of Mississippi. Widely acclaimed, the Boston Globe called it "Nothing less than the best Elvis book yet" and Kirkus Reviews described it as "The most fine-grained Elvis bio ever." The New York Daily News stated "This is the Elvis bio that gets behind the hype and the myth. Nobody ever wrote better about the making of Elvis than Elaine Dundy."

The biopic which depicted Elvis' relationship with Gladys is featured in the TV series Elvis (2005), which starred Jonathan Rhys Meyers as Elvis and Camryn Manheim as Gladys.

Dundy claimed that Elvis's great-great grandmother Nancy J. Burdine (married to Abner Tackett) was Jewish, citing Oscar Tackett, one of Elvis's third cousins. This claim has been repeated. Nate Bloom challenged the claim, stating that Dundy reported it without verifying the story as a "fact". He concluded that there is no mention of any Jewish ancestor in any of the available census records and the family never mentioned any Jewish ancestry to the orthodox Jewish Rabbi family they shared a house with in the 1950s. It has also been challenged by genealogical researcher Carrie Zeidman who didn't find any records connecting a Nancy J. Burdine to the Tackett family and concluded the claim "doesn’t stand up to the research".
