= Putney Lower Common =

Common land in Putney, London

Coordinates: 51.469°N 0.236°W

Putney Lower Common is an open parkland space in the London Borough of Wandsworth between the town centres of Putney and Barnes. It is part of Wimbledon and Putney Commons, lying 1.5 miles from the rest of the common area.

== Geography ==
The common has an area 13.22 ha, it borders with Barn Elms and Beverley Brook on the north, the residential Commondale and Horne Way areas on the west with Lower Common South road on the south, and with Barnes Common on the west side. The Lower Richmond road and Queen's ride run across the common.

== History ==
The land was enclosed from the 15th century, the Wimbledon and Putney Commons Act 1871 (34 & 35 Vict. c. cciv) entrusted the land from the Spencer family, to the Wimbledon and Putney Commons Conservators (WPCC), who have been responsible for managing the land ever since.

== Features ==
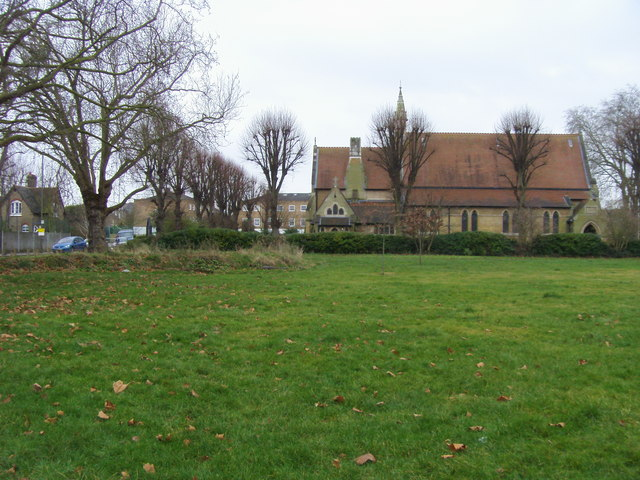
All Saints' Church

The Oasis Academy Putney primary school lies on the east side of the common, on the site of the former Putney Hospital, construction of the school involved the loss of commons land so that a new access road could be laid.

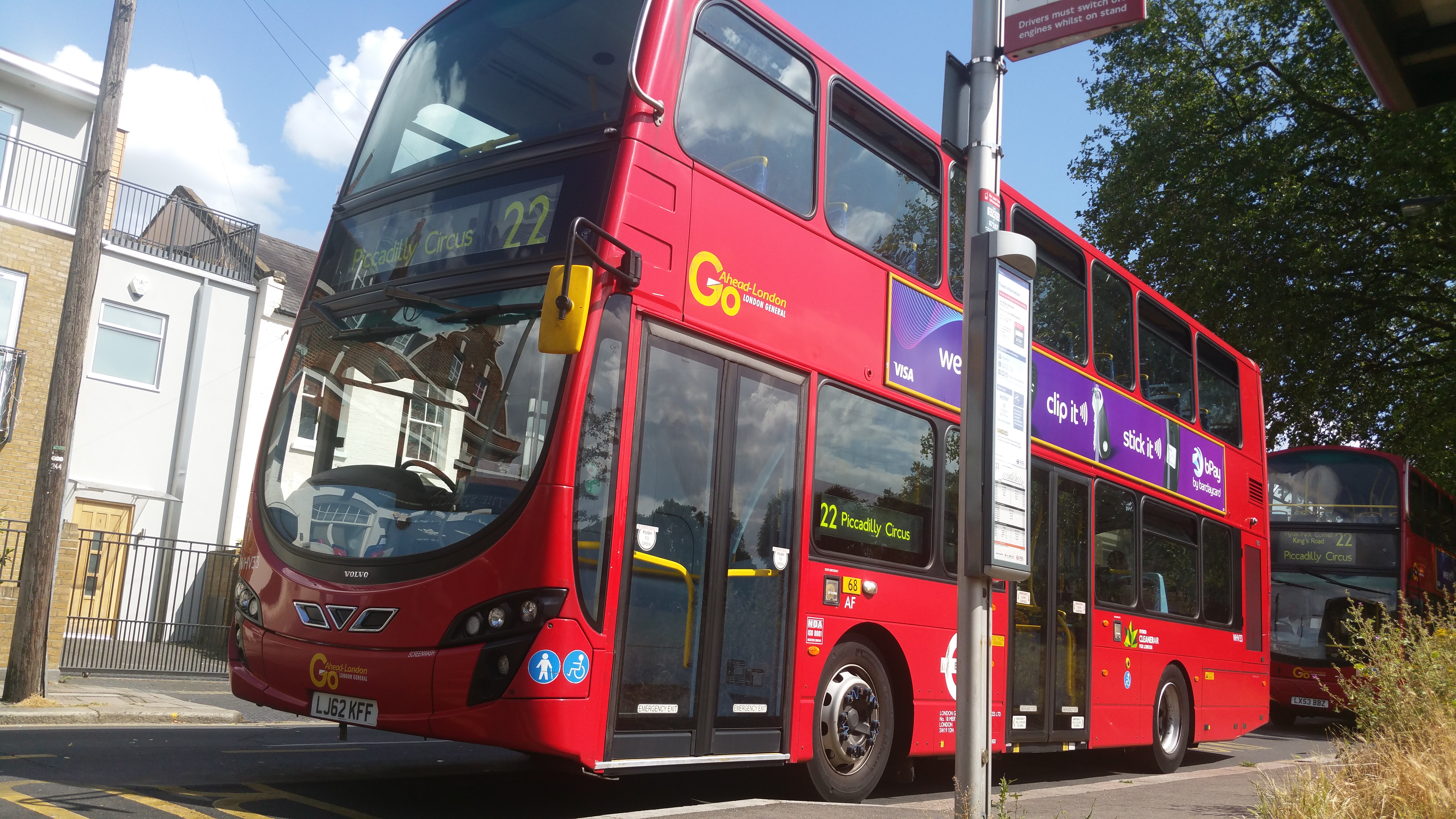
22 bus terminus

The Spencer pub is on the south side of the Lower Richmond road, and often expands its seating area onto the common in the summer, under licence with WPCC. All Saints is a Grade II* listed church on the south east corner of the common, it has a churchyard and features windows designed by William Morris. Transport for London's number 22 bus, run by London General for the Go-Ahead Group, terminates at Putney Common, with buses parking between the Spencer pub and All Saints church, before maintenance at the nearby Putney bus garage on Chelverton road.

Putney Lower Common Cemetery lies on the west side of the common on the Lower Richmond road, bordering with Barnes Common, it features several notable graves.

Funfairs visit the common on bank holidays, and the Santus circus have visited the common in late summer.

== Wildlife ==
The common is predominantly neutral grassland, it is a Site of Special Scientific Interest (SSSI), a Special Area of Conservation (SAC), and within the London Borough of Wandsworth is a designated site of borough importance.

The common is part of a wider habitat network that includes the WWT London Wetland Centre, Barnes Common, with the wildlife corridor of Putney Park Lane up to Putney Heath, Wimbledon Common and Richmond Park.

In 2019 the People's Trust for Endangered Species found that the site is a hotspot in London for hedgehogs, Greenspace Information for Greater London records show that stag beetles have been recorded on the common, as well as Hobbies, Kestrels and Kingfishers.

Several invasive species have been found on the common, Oak Processionary moth was first recorded in 2011 and the WPCC try to control its numbers with regular surveys, caterpillar removal, and application of the biocontrol agent Bacillus thuringiensis; Japanese knotweed and Himalayan balsam have also been recorded and removed.

The common has regularly won the London in Bloom gold award in the Common of the Year category, for management to improve the local environment.

== Sports grounds ==
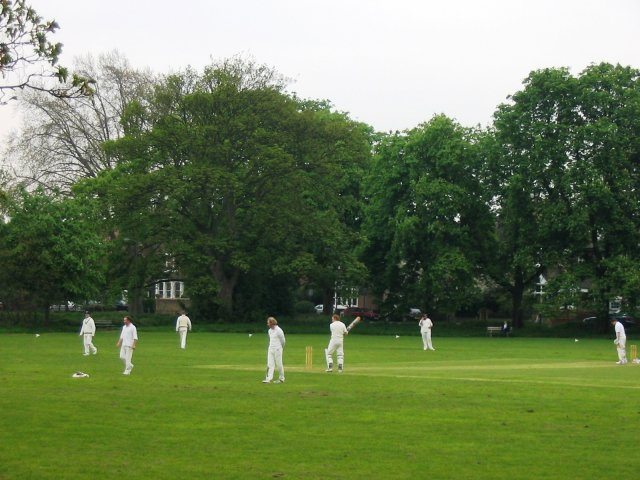
Putney Cricket club

Putney Cricket Club have a cricket pitch on the south side of the common, between Queens ride and Lower common South. There is an established walking trail that takes the common and Barnes common, with a distance of 3.4km. The Putney Town Bowling Club have a bowling green and clubhouse on the west side of the common, next to the Oasis Academy.

== In popular culture ==
Jilly Cooper's book, The Common Years (1984), is a diary about Cooper's life living near the Common.

== Transport ==
There are parking spaces on Mill Hill road by the cemetery, the Common is served by Transport for London buses 22, 265 and 284 which stop at Commondale on the Lower Richmond road, Barnes railway station (Southwestern Railway) is a 10 minute walk.
