= Little Mabel =

Series of children's books by Jilly Cooper

- Little Mabel (1980); Little Mabel's Great Escape (1981); Little Mabel Wins (1982); Little Mabel Saves the Day (1985)
- Author: Jilly Cooper
- Illustrator: Timothy Jaques
- Country: UK
- Language: English
- Genre: Children's fiction

Little Mabel is a series of children's picture books written by English author Jilly Cooper and illustrated by Timothy Jaques. There are four books in the series: Little Mabel, Little Mabel's Great Escape, Little Mabel Wins and Little Mabel Saves the Day. All books feature the misadventures of the mongrel Mabel and her street-dog father, who is obsessed with dustbins. Based on Cooper's love of mongrels, the books were all generally favourably reviewed with Cooper's humour praised by The Bookseller, the Vancouver Sun, and the Ottawa Citizen. Two of the books, Little Mabel Wins and Little Mabel Saves the Day, featured as stories in the British children's programme Jackanory.

== Little Mabel series ==
- Little Mabel - Little Mabel is a puppy, whose mother is a police dog and whose father is a street dog. Mabel goes to live with her father's family, but humans and dogs look down on her because she is a mongrel. Frightened by the milkman, Mabel runs away but is brought home by the local fire brigade - just in time for them to put out a real fire.
- Little Mabel's Great Escape - While Mabel's family goes on holiday she and her father are put into kennels. Determined to escape, Mabel digs a tunnel supervised by her father and they escape. However Mabel's police dog mother is meant to arrest the pair, nevertheless she hides the duo in her kennel. Lured by the smell of dustbins, both dogs escape again, and are accidentally transported home in a bin lorry.
- Little Mabel Wins - Little Mabel's father is dismayed that mongrels aren't allowed to enter Crufts, so he hatches a plan to cause chaos at the dog show. Accompanied by Mabel he sets off an explosive chocolate-based device which results in all the dogs going wild - all apart from Mabel who is so frightened she sits very still and therefore wins a prize for good behaviour.
- Little Mabel Saves the Day - Mabel and her family go on holiday to Somerset, but the farm animals frighten Mabel. Her father, who is obsessed with dustbins, befriends a local fox, but ends up threatened by the local hounds. Mabel ultimately frightens them away by wearing a wellington boot on her head, and the hounds disturb a family birthday.

== Background ==
Whilst Cooper is better known for her romances and bonkbuster novels, she has also written a series of four children's books centred on a mongrel puppy called Mabel. Known for her fondness for dogs, Cooper has often had mongrels as pets. When interviewed in 2013 to discuss the inclusion of a new class for mongrels at Crufts, Cooper described her book Little Mabel Wins as "prophetic" since it featured a protest by Mabel and Dad against the discrimination shown to mongrels there. The series was first published by Granada.

== Reception ==
First in the series, published in 1980, Little Mabel was described by The Evening Standard as "silly and joyful". The Vancouver Sun described the book as a "winsome tale of an unwanted mongrel", who ultimately triumphs and is praised. The review also praised Cooper's wryness in the humour of the book. The Bookseller described the book as "slightly old-fashioned". However, by April 1981 its first edition had sold out. Followed by Little Mabel's Great Escape, this second book was described as "good news for families". A review in The Bookseller noted the comparison between kennels and Colditz, and described how Cooper's writing had some "cutting edges" despite it being a book for children.

Third in the series Little Mabel Wins was reviewed by Richard Conduit in The Telegraph as a book "that reads aloud very well", however Conduit did not care for Jaques' "overbright" illustrations. The Ottawa Citizen described how the book "poked fun at the British class structure" and saw its core message was one where you should always be true to yourself. The fourth and final book in the series, Little Mabel Saves The Day, was reviewed by The Fiction Magazine who described it as "a lovely, messy, lively dog story". The Cambridge Evening News enjoyed the illustrations, and described the book as "another outlet for [Cooper's] love of mongrel dogs". It also described the eponymous puppy Mabel as a "pooch you either love or hate".

== Jackanory ==
In a debut for both the author and narrator, Little Mabel Wins featured on Jackanory in 1984, read by Victoria Wood, and was reprised in 1996 for Jackanory Gold. In 1987 Little Mabel Saves the Day featured in the television series, read by Liza Goddard.

== See also ==
- Intelligent and Loyal, non-fiction work on mongrels by Cooper
