= Octavia (novel) =

1977 novel by Jilly Cooper

- Second edition cover featuring Cooper
- Author: Jilly Cooper
- Language: English
- Genre: Romance
- Set in: 20th-century England
- Published: 1977 (Arlington Books)
- Publication place: United Kingdom
- Pages: 272
- Preceded by: Harriet
- Followed by: Prudence
- Website: https://www.jillycooper.co.uk/books/octavia/

Octavia – The Taming of the Shrew is a 1977 romance novel by English author Jilly Cooper. It is one of several works in her romance series. Octavia is an upper-class, spoilt woman, who meets Gareth on a narrowboat holiday. Initially they do not see eye-to-eye, but ultimately fall in love. Initial reviews were mixed, with Auberon Waugh describing it as "glib, facile, immature and superficial", but the 1993 edition sold 100,000 copies. In the 21st century, reviewers praised the character of Octavia for being "fabulously flawed" and the book has been referenced in works by other authors. A 2007 adaptation of the novel was filmed starring Tamsin Egerton, but as of 2009 had not been released by ITV.

== Plot ==
The novel follows the social life of the eponymous heroine Octavia, who is an upper-class, wealthy, beautiful and spoilt woman. She enjoys getting men to fall in love with her. She decides to seduce her friend Gussie's fiancé, Jeremy. Much of the novel takes place on a narrowboat holiday, where Octavia, Gussie and Jeremy are also joined by a fourth person, Welshman Gareth. He mercilessly teases Octavia all weekend, much to her infuriation. During the weekend, Octavia flirts with Jeremy a great deal and then kiss several times, finally caught by Gussie and Gareth. Jeremy promises Octavia that he will leave Gussie and they can start their life as a couple when they return to London. During the drive back, Jeremy realises that he does love Gussie, and for Octavia, now she has enraptured Jeremy and knows he is attracted to her, she is no longer interested in him, and despite his attitude to her, she is now attracted to Gareth.

Once back in London, the family company that provides Octavia with an extensive allowance is in financial trouble, and Gareth joins as a new director. One of his first tasks is to cut Octavia's allowance, so she if forced to move out of her luxurious flat into a bedsit and take up two jobs to pay back the company the thousands of pounds she owes. By day she works for a public relations company, by night as a waitress. This continues until one day when her brother, Xander, who has continued to work for the family comes to her with a problem. Xander is secretly gay and is being blackmailed by a former lover, Guido; Xander therefore needs to raise £2000 immediately, but he cannot borrow from the family business and has little money of his own. Xander asks Octavia if she can find the money. To do so Octavia approaches a pornographer, who had been chasing her to model for him for several years. She takes part in a photoshoot to raise the money for Xander. However, part-way through Gareth bursts in, beats up the pornographer and his retinue and takes Octavia away, angrily accusing her of modelling for her own greed. Gareth leaves Octavia close to her bedsit, and in despair she wanders in the rain through the park for hours. On her return, Gareth is waiting for her, having realised his anger was in fact love. They have sex, where Octavia experiences her first orgasm, and she moves in with him.

== Background ==
Octavia is part of a series of romance novels written by Cooper in the 1970s. The character of Gareth was supposedly modelled on singer George Humphreys, a Welshman with whom Cooper had an affair in the late 1950s. Published on 25 July 1977, the book's full title is Octavia – The Taming of the Shrew. The novel itself is set in the summer of 1976. Cooper posed for the cover photograph of an early edition of the novel.

== Reception ==
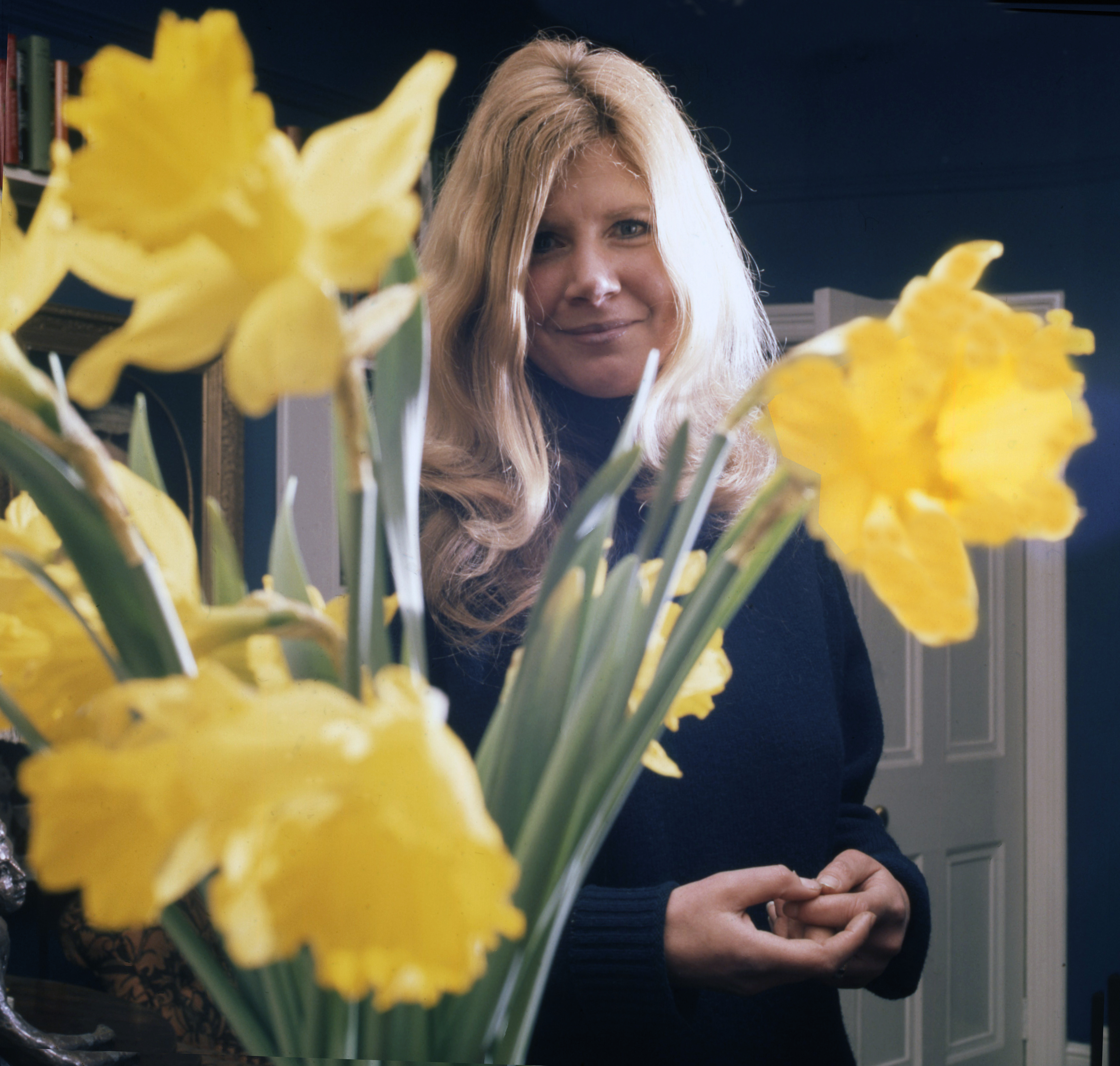
Cooper photographed by Allan Warren (1975)

Upon its release, Auberon Waugh reviewed the novel as "a glib, facile, immature and superficial romance" and expressed disappointment in the work since Waugh believed that Cooper could write a lot better. Elizabeth Grey from The Times noted that Cooper avoids the traditional romantic convention in which the heroine remains a virgin until the last page. Grey found the jokes annoying but still funny, and confessed to falling in love with the character of Octavia. Gareth, the romantic interest of Octavia, was described by the Manchester Evening News as "a gritty Welsh business tycoon" and the novel's predictable ending was remarked on, with the reviewer describing that anything other might have enraged Cooper's fandom. The Observer described the novel as "an incontinent little burble" but praised its word play. The brief review also mentioned the sub-plot where Octavia finds she can reach "a great whooshing" orgasm with Gareth. The Sun described the novel as "naughty and romantic" and that it made readers also think sexual and romantic thoughts.

On its paperback release in 1978, the Fife Free Press reviewed the book as an "easy-to-read romantic story" that would make a good holiday read. A 1993 edition of the novel sold over 100,000 copies. A 2006 edition, published (with the rest of the series) at the same time as Cooper's much longer novel Wicked!, sold 10,000 copies. In 2018 Red magazine listed Octavia' as one of their Top Ten books by Cooper. The eponymous Octavia in the novel is regarded as a complex character and 21st-century reviewers praised Cooper for writing a heroine who was "feisty" and "fabulously flawed". Anna Bonet, writing in The i Paper in 2025, described it as an escapist novel and a 1970s romcom.

== In popular culture ==
The purchase of this novel, and meeting its author at a book-signing, is the subject of a chapter in the 2010 novel Village Teacher by Jack Sheffield. An excerpt from the novel was included by India Knight in her anthology The Dirty Bits for Girls. Octavia is discussed in one of the teenage diary entries in Mud by Emily Thomas, published in 2018. In the book, the narrator, Lydia, is given her cousin's collection of Jilly Cooper novels, which she reads and the lives of heroines like Octavia help her see a possible future. A different cousin states that Cooper is "unrealistic" and Lydia should read Fay Weldon or Erica Jong instead. In 2023, Irish journalist Emily Hourican stated that she had choose Octavia and the other novels in Cooper's romance series as her specialist subject on Mastermind. In 2025's Read Yourself Happy, Daisy Buchanan described how she could empathise with Octavia's insecurities.

== Adaptations ==
An adaptation of the novel was commissioned and filmed for ITV1 in 2007. However, it was not aired at its due date in 2008 due to financial issues at ITV, and as of February 2009 had no set date for release. The concept was to televise hour-long episodes of Cooper's romance series. With Octavia as the pilot, three further episodes based on other works from the series were due to be made. It was produced by Touchpaper Television and adapted by Jonathan Harvey and would have starred Tamsin Egerton.
