= Jolly Marsupial =

1982 collected writings

- Author: Jilly Cooper
- Language: English
- Subject: Australia
- Genre: Non-fiction
- Publisher: Eyre Methuen
- Publication date: 1982
- Publication place: United Kingdom
- ISBN: 978-0-552-12359-4
- Website: https://www.jillycooper.co.uk/books/jolly-marsupial/

Jolly Marsupial: Down Under and Other Scenes is a 1982 collection of humorous journalism by English author Jilly Cooper. The collection is based on her 1980 tour of Australia to promote her book Class, but also includes other journalism.

== Background ==
Based on an account of Cooper's 17 day tour of Australia in 1980, which took place to promote her 1979 book Class. Her account of the tour was published in full in this book for the first time, having been significantly cute by her editors on its first publication. Parts of the tour account had also been previously serialised in the Australia publication The Age. The book also includes excerpts from her journalism for The Sunday Times and The Mail on Sunday.

== Reception ==
Upon publication the Manchester Evening News described the volume as Cooper "at her rib-tickling" best. The Toronto Star, in a 1983 review of the book described how Cooper had a "vast readership, not all admiring" and went on to describe her as the "hyena priestess of English journalism". It compared her to the American writers Jimmy Breslin and Dorothy Parker and the English diarist Samuel Pepys. It highlighted the critical nature of many of her observations, including those on Australia and the feminist magazine Spare Rib.
