= Jolly Superlative =

1975 writing collection

- Cover of first edition
- Author: Jilly Cooper
- Language: English
- Genre: Journalism
- Publisher: Eyre Methuen
- Publication date: 1975
- Publication place: United Kingdom
- Preceded by: Jolly Super Too
- Followed by: Super Jilly
- Website: https://www.jillycooper.co.uk/books/jolly-superlative/

Jolly Superlative is a 1975 anthology of journalism by English author Jilly Cooper. Comprising articles primarily first published in The Sunday Times, the collection was praised for its "lyrical spontaneity" and Cooper's "limitless comic invention".

== Background ==
Comprising a selection of Cooper's articles first published mostly in The Sunday Times, but also in Vogue, the book was her third published collection of journalism.

== Reception ==
Upon publication in 1975 the Birmingham Daily Post reviewed the collection positively, praising Cooper's "lyrical spontaneity" and "souffle touch, rare among British humourists, who tend to equate humour with mock-pedantry". Topics singled out in the review included suburban snobbery, middle-class sex and graves. The Daily Telegraph praised Cooper's "limitless comic invention". In contrast, Clive James, reviewing for The Observer stated that the book was "precisely what you might expect", yet compared it to The Goodies Book of Criminal Records. In 1976 the Sydney Morning Herald took a positive view of the work, describing the collection as a "cheering, sometimes moving, immensely witty little book". The reviewer, Joan Flanagan, praised Cooper's writing on measles, Princess Anne's wedding and the British royal family more generally.

Republished in 1981, the Manchester Evening News described the book as "highly entertaining". This was echoed by the Daily Post who described how Cooper's brand of humour could attack every subject, but rarely cause actual harm. The reviewer, Don Sutton, singled out her articles on the Trades Union Congress and Amsterdam's red-light district as highlights in the collection.
