= Between the Covers (book) =

2020 writing collection

- Author: Jilly Cooper
- Language: English
- Genre: Non-fiction
- Publisher: Transworld
- Publication date: 29 October 2020
- Publication place: United Kingdom
- Website: www.jillycooper.co.uk/books/between-the-covers

Between the Covers is a 2020 anthology of writing about sex, marriage and relationships by English author Jilly Cooper. Based on excerpts from Cooper's columns for The Sunday Times written between 1968 and 1971, the book was praised for its honesty about her own marriage during that time as well as the fact that its publication was a timely reminder for readers that Cooper had been a hugely successful journalist before her novels.

== Background ==
The book comprises excerpts from Cooper's columns for The Sunday Times, written between 1968 and 1971. The book was released on 29 October 2020 and published by Transworld.

== Reception ==
Reviewing the work for The Guardian, journalist Rachel Cooke described how although some of the pieces might feel dated many of them felt very truthful to the modern reader. Cooke particularly praised the segment entitled 'Being A Second Wife' for its honesty about Cooper's "pathological jealousy" of her husband's first wife. Further reviews were also positive, citing Cooper's range of anecdotes about marriage—from children to strip clubs. Tanya Gold, reviewing the collection for the Daily Telegraph, described it as "sadder and darker than her novels" and praised Cooper's "riveting and spare" journalistic writing style. Gold also reflected on how Cooper's reputation as a journalist had been subsumed by her later work as a novelist, and that it is easy to forget what a successful columnist she was to start with.

Hilary Rose, reviewing the collection for The Times described it as "the sort of jolly romp that a COVID-weary nation needs". Rose also discussed how the expectations of wives in the 1970s were different to the 2020s: Cooper was expected to leave her job and become a housewife, whether or not she wanted to or was any good at it. Rose also praised Cooper's honest reflections on her own marriage: hiding bills, jealousy and the boredom of childcare. This honesty was also praised by Mary Morris, writing for The Times Literary Supplement, as well as Cooper's appetite for reading and her ability to quote from a range of authors at will. The book was included in The Observer's 2025 list of the best of Cooper's works.
