= Jolly Super =

1971 writing collection

- First edition cover
- Author: Jilly Cooper
- Language: English
- Genre: Journalism; humour
- Publisher: Corgi
- Publication date: 1971
- Publication place: United Kingdom
- ISBN: 978-0-552-11751-7
- Followed by: Jolly Super Too
- Website: https://www.jillycooper.co.uk/books/jolly-super/

Jolly Super is a 1971 collection of humorous journalism by English author Jilly Cooper. Topics covered in the collection include 'Men's Lib', hunting, sex, cricket, and boarding schools. The title of the book is a nickname given to Cooper by the satirical magazine Private Eye. It was republished in 1981 with a revised introduction.

== Synopsis ==
The humorous collection includes journalistic articles on a range of topics including rugby, alcohol, 'Men's Lib', being a young wife, hunting, weekend guests, cricket, sex, boarding schools, the telephone, embarrassment, and heaven.

== Background ==
Based on columns that Cooper wrote for The Sunday Times, starting in 1969, there are forty articles in the collection. The title of the book is a nickname given to Cooper by the satirical magazine Private Eye. It was Cooper's second book, after How To Stay Married.

== Reception ==
Upon publication the Worcester News reviewed the book positively, describing how if a reader enjoyed Cooper's humour, then they would enjoy this book. It went on to say that the compilation was successful because the incidents that happen could happen to everyone, making them relatable. Clive James, reviewing the book for The Observer described how the re-published pieces "re-read better than [Cooper's] detractors would allow". The Huddersfield Daily Examiner described it as "a fun book", but the reviewer found that the stereotypes in it were repetitive and they wished Cooper would turn her "undoubted talents to something less trivial". The Northern Echo reviewed the book as a "lively anthology" of "prattling pieces".

The Toronto Star, reviewed the revised 1981 edition that celebrated the ten-year anniversary of the book and described it as a work that is "awfully, awfully English" and "reeks of class consciousness". However it went on to describe it as a "witty collection" with many amusing stories.
