= How to Survive Christmas =

1986 non-fiction work

- Author: Jilly Cooper
- Illustrator: Timothy Jaques
- Language: English
- Genre: Humour; non-fiction
- Publication date: 1986
- Pages: 142
- Website: jillycooper.co.uk/books/how-to-survive-christmas

How to Survive Christmas: An Xmasochist's Guide to the Darkest Days of the Year is a 1986 humorous book by English author Jilly Cooper. It is designed to be a handbook for the festive season. Written whilst the author was living in the Cotswolds, Cooper stated in later writings that she was surprised her publishers accepted the manuscript. The Northern Echo listed the volume as part of its 1986 critics' choice list for Christmas. The book was reissued in 1998 and 2007, with a further edition proposed for release in November 2025.

== Synopsis ==
Designed as a handbook to Christmas, this humorous and satirical account of the festive period is based on the experiences of the fictional O'Aga family: Scarlett, the mother; her husband Noel; their children, Holly, Robin, Carol and Nicholas; the husband's mistress, Ms Stress; the family dog, Difficult Patch. The book is divided into five sections which cover the period from October to January. The first section, entitled "Christmas Is Coming", includes writing on who to invite for Christmas, the workplace during the festive season and nativity plays. The second, entitled "Bearing Gifts We Traverse Too Far", includes content on lovesickness, adultery, step children and childlessness. The third, "The Dark Night Breaks, the Glory Wakes", covers Christmas Eve, present opening, Christmas dinner and festive television. The fourth, "But What Comes After ...", examines Boxing Day, thank you letters and pantomime. The final section "We Make the Golden Journey to Samarkand" discusses spending Christmas abroad.

== Background ==
Cooper was dismissive of the book in later writing about it, suggesting she was surprised her publishers accepted the manuscript. In a short interview with The Houston Chronicle in 1986, prior to publication, Cooper stated that she hated Christmas, describing it as "a rat race where everyone drinks themselves insensible from the first of December to the middle of January". Earlier in the year, speaking to the Irish Independent, Cooper stated she loved Christmas, but felt it could be a "time of major panic" for people. Written whilst Cooper was living in the Cotswolds, the book takes a satirical and humorous approach to Christmas in England.

== Reception ==
Upon publication in 1986, The Northern Echo listed the volume as part of its critics choice list for Christmas. In their review it was described as "a sceptical view" of the festive season. In contrast the Lincolnshire Echo described the book as "hilarious", as did the Daily Post. Advice from the book has been quoted in a range of other places including tips such as opening presents on Christmas afternoon, drunken pre-Christmas lunches, not inviting lonely guests, doing Christmas shopping solo, amongst others. In a 1990 review for Angels Rush In, which features excerpts from the book, How to Survive Christmas was described as Cooper's "most useful" work.

The book was revised and reissued in 1998. Whilst the Telegraph & Argus found its humour "appealing", but the Hull Daily Mail was less positive about it, describing the book as "pointless", while conceding that Cooper does "pointless and insubstantial better than many people". In 1999 The Guardian listed the book as a key work to read to help you prepare for Christmas.

The book was reissued in 2007, although it was not updated for the release. In an interview to discuss the new edition, Cooper stated that her Christmases used to be a sea of plastic, but were now a sea of computer games; she also stated that she was a "great believer in a traditional Christmas".

A new edition of the book was due to be published in November 2025.
