= Class (Cooper book) =

1979 non-fiction book by Jilly Cooper

- US 1st edition cover
- Author: Jilly Cooper
- Audio read by: Penelope Keith
- Language: English
- Subject: Social class in the United Kingdom
- Publication date: 1979
- Website: www.jillycooper.co.uk/books/class-a-view-from-middle-england/

Class: A View From Middle England is a 1979 book by English author Jilly Cooper that offers a humorous, satirical commentary on the English class system. While categorized as non-fiction, it presents its commentary through fictional characters presented as caricatures of different social classes, illustrating Cooper's views on class distinctions and social behaviours.

The book received positive reviews upon publication, although Mary Cadogan described how portrayals of working-class people were less successful than those of other classes. The work has led to Cooper being compared to Nancy Mitford and analysis over subsequent decades after publication has led it to be drawn on as a text, for example in Scoff: A History of Food and Class in Britain, and it has been analysed by historians and sociologists studying class in Britain, including David Cannadine and Laurie Taylor.

== Synopsis ==
The book is a humorous, satirical commentary based on the lives of fictional characters who are caricatures of Cooper's views of the English class system. Upper classes are represented by Harry Stow-Crat and family, with middle and working class characters given names such as Jen Teale, Mr and Mrs Nouveau-Richards and Mr and Mrs Definitely-Disgusting. (Note: Some of these names are puns or holorimes on class-related words: 'Harry Stow-Crat' on aristocrat; 'Jen Teale' on genteel; 'Nouveau-Richards' on nouveau riche) Their fictional lives are followed from birth to death throughout the book.

== Background ==
Cooper wrote in Angels Rush In that writing Class rescued her family from financial difficulties. Employed as writer for the Sunday Times, during its strike of 1978 Cooper and her husband ran out of money. However, in August 1979 the Daily Mail signed a contract to serialise the book, paying Cooper £37,000 at the time and reversing the family's financial misfortune.

== Reception ==
Mary Cadogan reviewing the book in the Birmingham Daily Post described it as a humorous work that treats the concept of class without snideness or superiority. She stated that depictions of the upper and middle classes had "deadly precision", but that the book was less successful in its coverage of working class lives. Cadogan does also recognise that Cooper understands that class distinctions "fray at the edges" which introduces complexity to the analysis. Diana Pulson writing in the Liverpool Daily Post criticised the characterisation as "pretentious". Upon its publication, Ralf Dahrendorf reviewed it for the London Review of Books, describing the work as one where "the characters are fun, the observations acute". Comparisons were immediately drawn to Nancy Mitford at publication by both Pulson and Dahrendorf, with the latter characterising her writing style as "somewhere between Nancy Mitford and a Daily Mail column".

Promotion of the publication included a book tour to Australia in May 1980. Cooper's account of the tour was serialised at the time, then subsequently published in the volume Jolly Marsupial, which was published in 1982.

== Audio ==
An audio cassette of the book was released in 1982 with Penelope Keith as the voice over; the Aberdeen Evening Express described her as the "logical choice" since she had acted in To the Manor Born in a role that reflected "the impoverished upper class".

== Analysis ==
Paul Fussell discusses Cooper's approach to social class in his 1992 book. The book was part of Laurie Taylor's sociology syllabus at the University of York. Published in 2000 David Cannadine's Class in Britain assessed Cooper's book, pointing out that Cooper herself had felt that it did not fully describe the intricacies of the British class system. Cannadine also used it as evidence for women's attitudes to class, describing how Jilly Cooper gives the impression that women's opinions mirror those of patriarchal figures in their lives, but that he is uncomfortable with that. David Rush continued to cite Nancy Mitford as a source for Cooper's views on the upper classes in 2018.

Cooper's book is also drawn on for Pen Vogler's 2020 work Scoff: A History of Food and Class in Britain. Vogler uses a range of examples from Cooper's book to indicate social class, including: marmalade brand; the nomenclature of lunch and dinner; coffee at breakfast; mashed potato; the 'chicness' of goose at Christmas; and fish knives. Tabitha Lasley, giving an overview of Cooper's works in Esquire in 2022, addresses the lack of marital social mobility in the books by describing how Cooper "sidesteps" class by having key characters marry foreigners. The same year German writer Detlev Piltz published a book on the British class system, which drew on Cooper's Class.
