= Intelligent and Loyal =

1981 book by Jilly Cooper

- Author: Jilly Cooper
- Illustrator: Graham Wood (photographer)
- Language: English
- Subject: Mongrels
- Genre: Animal writing
- Publisher: Corgi
- Publication date: 1981
- Publication place: United Kingdom
- Pages: 176
- Website: www.jillycooper.co.uk/books/intelligent-and-loyal/
- Published as Mongrel Magic in 1992

Intelligent and Loyal: A Celebration of the Mongrel is a 1981 humorous, non-fiction work by English author Jilly Cooper. A self-professed dog lover and "mongrel addict", Cooper gathered stories for the book by crowd-sourcing contributions from newspaper readers with an advert entitled "Mongrels Lib". The book was one of the earliest works entirely dedicated to mongrels. It was illustrated by photographs sent by readers, as well as newly-commissioned images by Graham Wood. Cooper created her own humorous typology for mongrels, with 24 varieties. On publication, the Southall Gazette described it as a book "no dog lover would want to miss". Its title was altered in 1992 to Mongrel Magic and the volume was republished.

== Synopsis ==
The book is based on a wide range of crowd-sourced anecdotes from the owners of mongrels. Cooper arranged these stories into thematic chapters based on characteristics or habits of the dogs. The first chapter discusses how a mongrel is defined and how to classify the many variations of mongrel that exist. Chapters that focus on characteristics include those on intelligence, loyalty, comfort, sexuality, sociability and clairvoyance. Chapters that focus on habits include those on fighting, defence, street mongrels, food and diet, associations with other animals, military dogs and old age.

== Background ==
Cooper is a self-professed dog lover and "mongrel addict". She grew up in a family that had mongrels, and as an adult owned several, including one called Fortnum and his daughters Mabel and Barbara, and later Gypsy and Hero. She reportedly wore a locket in which she kept a photograph of one of her mongrels after they died, and selected a mongrel as her choice of animal to be reincarnated as.

To gather stories about mongrels for the book, Cooper put an advert in newspapers asking people to share stories about their pets for the book. The advert was entitled Mongrels Lib. (Note: The title refers to Women's Lib, an informal term for the women's liberation movement.) She received thousands of responses as a result. The advert read:

Mongrels Lib - Jilly Cooper is writing the definitive book on mongrels, if you have or know of one, information and photographs will be welcome. It's time mongrels got a fair deal.

— Jilly Cooper

Respondents also sent photographs of their pets and many of these illustrated the book, alongside new images taken by Graham Wood, who was British Press Photographer of the Year in 1980. Wood was in fact scared of dogs, due to experiences in early childhood.

Intelligent and Loyal was the earliest book to be written exclusively about mongrels. In it Cooper created her own humorous typology for mongrels, with 24 varieties such as the Vertical Shagpile, the Spanish Policeman's Hat-Ear (based on her dog Mabel), the Pied Wagtail, the Family Circler, the Hover Cur (based on her dog Barbara), amongst others. (Note: Many of the mongrel names are puns, for example the Family Circler references McVitie's biscuit selection Family Circle.)

== Reception ==
Published by Corgi Books, at the time of its publication it was Cooper's twenty-second book to be published within twelve years. The Manchester Evening News review described it as filled "with anecdotes about mongrels' sense of humour, resourcefulness, intuition, deeds of derring do [and] heart-warming characteristics". The Black Country Evening Mail described the book as "lovely and touching" and highlighted some of the funny stories included in the work. The Southall Gazette described it as a book "no dog lover would want to miss". On publication the Liverpool Echo reviewed the book favourably since it was "moving, funny and highly indicative of the fact that for a great many people a dog is man's best friend". In a later 1983 review the newspaper described how Cooper turned her observational wit away from humans "to mongrels and is equally brilliant at that". This review also agreed with Cooper's argument that mongrels are more "clever, intelligent and ... classy" than a pedigree dog.

== Editions ==
The 1992 paperback publication altered the title of the book to Mongrel Magic. At the 1997 opening of the British Library's new premises in St Pancras, The Guardian remarked that the book under its revised title was one of the contemporary works donated to the institution to mark the occasion.

== In popular culture ==
As a result of the book's success Cooper and her dogs subsequently made public appearances, including on The Animals Roadshow in 1989, and at dog shows such Superdogs '83. Cooper's work on mongrels is cited in other books about dogs, including The Invention of the Modern Dog, Best Dog Stories and Your Obedient Servant.

== See also ==
- Little Mabel (children's book series by Cooper)
