= How to Stay Married (book) =

Non-fiction book by Jilly Cooper

- Author: Jilly Cooper
- Illustrator: Timothy Jacques
- Subject: Marriage
- Publisher: Methuen
- Publication date: 1969
- Website: https://www.jillycooper.co.uk/books/how-to-stay-married/

How to Stay Married is a 1969 non-fiction work by English author Jilly Cooper. This was Cooper's first book and it uses humour to share guidance on marriage, from a wife's perspective. At the time of first publication the book was a bestseller and was described in a review in the Coventry Evening Telegraph as "forthright, uninhibited and irreverant". The book was reissued in 2011, forty-two years after publication to celebrate fifty years of Cooper's marriage. Reflecting on its content, Cooper described it as "terribly politically incorrect". Author Jojo Moyes reviewed it in 2011 with some warmth, but described many of its ideas as "pretty dated".

== Synopsis ==
This non-fiction book uses irreverence and humour to share guidance on the institution of marriage, written from Cooper's perspective as a wife. It gives advice on many aspects, including sex, weddings, honeymoons, working, cleaning, and how to undertake difficult interactions with your husband's family.

== Background ==
How to Stay Married was Cooper's first book. At the time of its publication in 1969, Cooper had been married to her husband Leo for seven years. Whilst writing it she was also working as a journalist for The Sunday Times and had adopted a young baby. Her contract only allowed her three months to write the book.

== Reception ==
Published in 1969 to coincide with book sales for Christmas, How to Stay Married was a bestseller on publication. Terry Cross, writing in the Coventry Evening Telegraph in 1969, described Cooper's writing as "forthright, uninhibited and irreverant" and stated that those qualities were present in the book, but that the "more prudish may take a dim view of her opinions". Another 1969 review in the "Padre's Column" in the Wolverhampton Express & Star praised the book for focusing on qualities such as tenacity to ensure the success of a marriage. The Huddersfield Daily Examiner described it as having "an amusing writing style that zips through marital problems".

The book was reissued in 2011 to celebrate Cooper's Golden Wedding anniversary. It was also republished in 2019, fifty years after it was published with a new foreword from the author. Reflecting on its 2011 re-issue, Cooper described the book as "terribly politically incorrect". She also discussed how she was appalled by some of the views written in it, but suggested that she was "writing in a different age". Jojo Moyes described the book in 2011 as "humorous romp through married life, sex, rows, DIY and affaires" but also admitted that some of the ideas in it were "pretty dated" and it focused too much on wives putting husbands first. Katy Byrne, reviewing in the Irish Independent in 2018, described it as "old-fashioned, unapologetically sexist, and, at times, downright offensive. But it's also warm, witty and – whisper it – wise".

How to Stay Married's depiction of marriage has been compared to the Charlotte Bingham's memoir Coronet Among the Weeds, with both offering images of "Swinging London". Phrases from How to Stay Married also appear in the Oxford Dictionary of Quotations.
