= Leo Cooper (publisher) =

British publisher

Leonard Cooper (25 March 1934 – 29 November 2013) was a British publisher who worked for numerous publishing houses before setting up his own independent publishing house, Leo Cooper Ltd, in 1968.

== Early life and career ==
He was educated at Radley College where he took charge of the military band and distinguished himself in rugby and cricket. He was capped at cricket for the Yorkshire schoolboys; in later life he smashed Denis Compton for six with such vigour that he toppled a spectator sitting in a wheelchair into a nearby pond.

Cooper's publishing business was based upon monumental works such as Lord Anglesey's eight-volume History of the British Cavalry (1973-95) and the Famous Regiments series. He was always on the look out for what George Orwell called "unofficial history", such as Antonia Hunt's Little Resistance (1982), the extraordinary story of an English schoolgirl's experiences in German-occupied France.

In 1970, Leo Cooper Ltd merged with the long-established firm of Seeley, Service, which was in turn bought by Frederick Warne in 1979 after the company went into receivership and then in 1982 he moved under the umbrella of Secker & Warburg, then part of the Heinemann Group. In 1990 the firm was sold to the Barnsley Chronicle and renamed Pen & Sword Books.

Cooper died in 2013, aged 79.

== Personal life ==
Cooper married author Jilly Sallitt in 1961 following the break-up of his first marriage to Diana, his former housemaster's daughter. The couple had known each other since childhood, although they did not marry until she was 24 and he was 27. In the 1980s, the couple left Putney in London for The Chantry, an old manor house in Gloucestershire. The couple were unable to have children naturally so adopted two children. They also had five grandchildren. In 1990, publisher Sarah Johnson publicly revealed that she had been having an affair with Cooper for the previous six years. Cooper and his wife separated after this revelation, but they eventually reconciled.

He was diagnosed with Parkinson's disease in 2001.

His memoir, All My Friends Will Buy It (Spellmount Publishers), was published in 2005.
