= Tanya Gold =

English journalist

- Born: 31 December 1973 (age 52); Merton, London, England
- Education: Merton College, Oxford
- Occupation: Journalist
- Notable credit(s): Daily Mail columnist The Guardian columnist The Independent columnist The Spectator columnist

Tanya Gold (born 31 December 1973) is an English freelance journalist.

== Career ==
Gold has written for British newspapers, including The Guardian, the Daily Mail, The Independent, The Daily Telegraph, The Sunday Times, the Evening Standard, New Statesman, The Oldie, The Jewish Chronicle and for The Spectator magazine. She has also written for The New York Times.

In 2009, Gold was commended in the Feature Writer of the Year category at the British Press Awards. In 2010, she won Feature Writer of the Year at the British Press Awards and was also nominated for Columnist of the Year.

== Personal life ==
Gold is married and has a son, who she is bringing up in the Jewish faith. They live in Penzance, Cornwall. She is a republican and has described herself as an 'an irreligious minor-public-school bourgeois Jew'.
