= Jilly Cooper =

English author (1937–2025)

Dame Jilly Cooper DBE
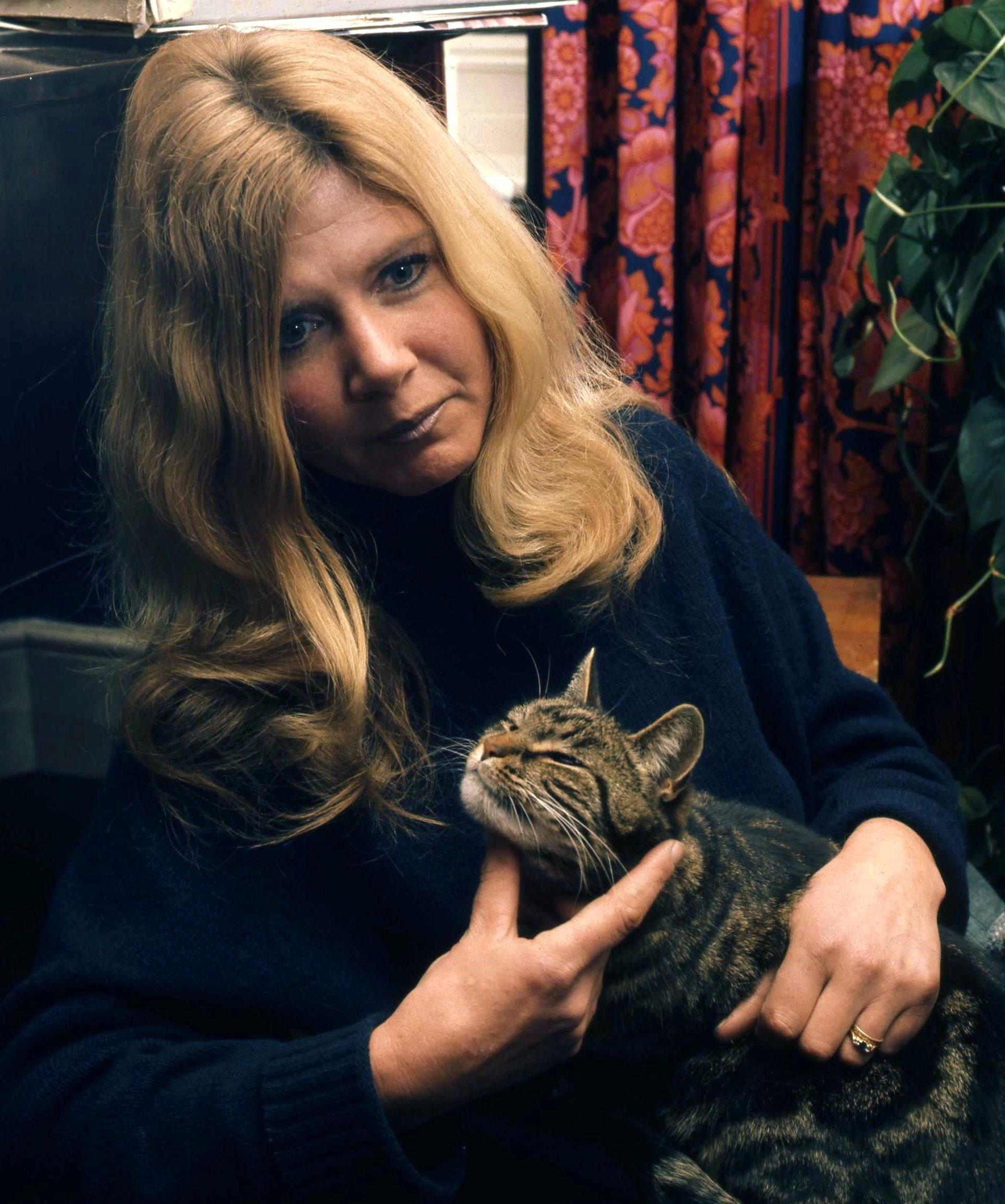
- Cooper in 1974
- Born: Jill Sallitt; 21 February 1937; Hornchurch, Essex, England
- Died: 5 October 2025 (aged 88); Gloucester, England
- Occupation: Author
- Spouse: Leo Cooper (m. 1961; died 2013)
- Children: 2
- Writing career
- Genres: Erotic, romance
- Notable work: Rutshire Chronicles
- Website: jillycooper.co.uk

Dame Jilly Cooper (née Sallitt; 21 February 1937 – 5 October 2025) was an English author and journalist, best known for her long-running Rutshire Chronicles series. She began her career in journalism and published several works of non-fiction, including books on class, animals and marriage, before turning to fiction. Her first book was How to Stay Married, which was published in 1969. She published several collections of journalism, alongside other non-fiction volumes throughout much of her career. Cooper's first novel to be published was the romance Emily, which appeared in 1975 and was followed by five more, as well as a volume of short stories. Cooper was also an anthologist and wrote the Little Mabel series of children's books.

Cooper went on to become a prominent figure in British popular literature, noted for her witty social commentary and depictions of upper-middle-class life. Her best-known works are the Rutshire Chronicles of which the 1985 novel Riders was the first; it was followed by ten more volumes with the last instalment, Tackle!, published in 2023. The series is known for its humour, sexuality and depictions of upper-class life; several of the volumes feature the character Rupert Campbell-Black as a key protagonist. Whilst Riders alone sold over one million copies, and her romance novels were compared to those of Nancy Mitford and Barbara Cartland, not all reviews were positive. Private Eye lampooned Cooper and gave her the nickname "Jolly Super", which she later used as a title for one of her own books. Nevertheless, Cooper is recognised as one of the key writers of the bonkbuster novel, along with Jackie Collins, Shirley Conran and Judith Krantz. Whilst few academics have analysed her work, those that have recognise her ability to portray a large cast of characters and her focus on pleasure as a literary theme. Academic Ian Patterson compared her to Anthony Trollope and Charles Dickens.

In 2025, the Jilly Cooper Prize was established as part of the Comedy Women in Print Awards to honour her contribution to comic fiction. After Cooper's death in the same year, Queen Camilla described her as a "wonderfully witty and compassionate friend". Cooper had received several honours during her lifetime, including that of Dame Commander of the Order of the British Empire (DBE) in the 2024 New Year Honours for services to literature and charity. Several of her works were adapted for television and radio, including the second Rutshire Chronicles volume, Rivals, which was adapted by Disney+ and released in 2024. It starred David Tennant and Aidan Turner.

== Early life ==
Jill Sallitt was born on 21 February 1937 in Hornchurch, Essex, to Mary Elaine (née Whincup) and Brigadier W. B. Sallitt. She grew up in Ilkley, Yorkshire, and in Surrey. Cooper was educated at Moorfield School in Ilkley and Godolphin School in Salisbury, Wiltshire. She subsequently learnt to type in Oxford.

== Journalism and non-fiction ==
Aged 20, Cooper became a junior reporter for The Middlesex Independent, based in Brentford. She worked for the paper from 1957 to 1959. Subsequently, she worked as an account executive, copywriter, publisher's reader and receptionist. Her break came with a chance meeting at a dinner party with Godfrey Smith, the editor of The Sunday Times Magazine, who asked her to write a feature about her experiences as a young married woman. This led to a column in which Cooper wrote about marriage, sex and housework. That column ran from 1969 to 1982, when she moved to The Mail on Sunday, where she worked as a columnist for a further five years.

In parallel to her journalism, Cooper wrote several humorous and satirical books: her earliest columns led to the publication of her first book, the satirical How to Stay Married, in 1969, which was quickly followed by another satirical guide to working life, How to Survive from Nine to Five, in 1970. Further satirical works were Men and Super Men, published in 1972, and Women and Super Women, published in 1974. The former has mixed reviews, with the Liverpool Daily Post describing the puns as bad, but that Cooper's writing had a "knowing adolescence". In contrast the Evening Despatch instructed all its readers to immediately buy it, as a guide to "men and sex". Women and Super Women was reviewed positively by Clive James in The Observer, whereas other reviews described the book as cruel (if funny) in its discussions of a wide range of women.

Cooper's journalism was first collected into a single volume, Jolly Super, in 1971. That collection took its title from the nickname given to Cooper by Private Eye. A further collection Jolly Super Too was published in 1973. The Birmingham Evening Mail compared Cooper to Mick McManus as someone the public loved to hate, and stated that the book would deliver "a snigger a minute" to readers. Jolly Superlative was published in 1975 and largely included pieces from The Sunday Times, but also Vogue, and was praised by The Daily Telegraph for its "limitless comic invention". In 1977 another collection of journalism, Super Jilly, was reviewed by Clive James in The Observer as "another breathless year-book by the Sunday Times' head-girl". The same year How to Stay Married and How to Survive from Nine to Five were republished together in a single volume in 1977 under the revised title How To Survive Work and Wedlock. The combined volume had mixed reviews from "saucy, but relevant" according to the Sydney Morning Herald, to the Evening Standard describing how "Women's Lib must hate her insouciant approach to the woman's world".

The theme of class dominated much of her writing and her non-fiction with her work written from an explicitly upper-middle-class British perspective, with emphasis on the relationships between men and women and matters of social class in contemporary Britain. Upon the publication of 1979's book Class, Ralf Dahrendorf reviewed it for the London Review of Books, describing the work as one where "the characters are fun, the observations acute". Published in 2000 David Cannadine's Class in Britain assessed Cooper's book, pointing out that Cooper herself had felt that it did not fully describe the intricacies of the British class system.

Another republication during this period was 1980's Super Cooper, which was a volume of excerpts from her earlier books Men and Super Men and Women and Super Women. This was described the Sydney Morning Herald as a "brilliant guide to the sexes" and by the Liverpool as a volume "that never disappoints the reader". Jolly Marsupial another volume of journalism, this time focussing on Cooper's 1980 tour of Australia to promote the book Class, was published in 1982.

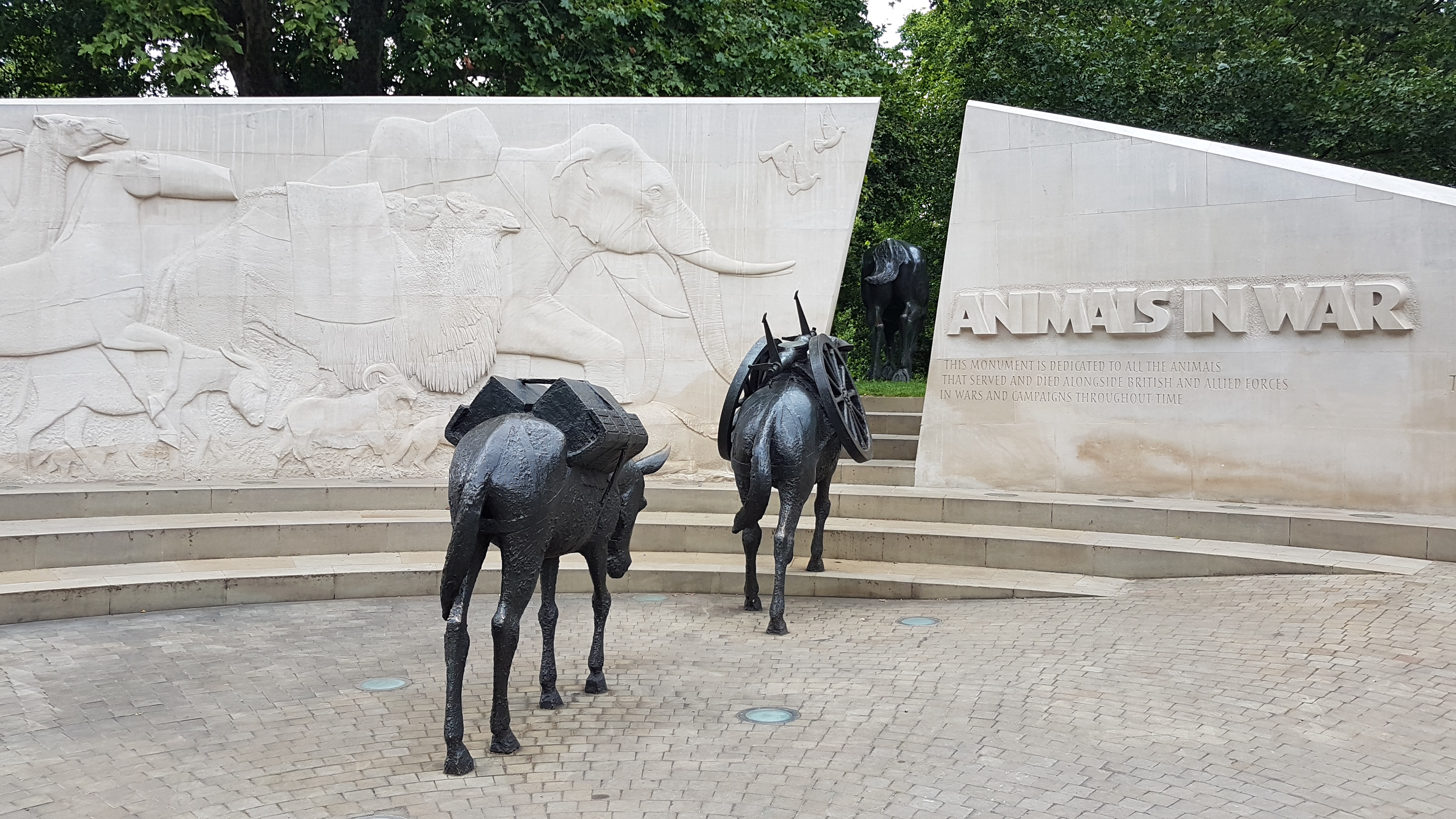
Animals in War memorial, London, 2007

In 1981, Cooper published Intelligent and Loyal, which is a book about mongrels. In it Cooper created her own humorous typology for mongrels. To gather stories about mongrels for the book, Cooper put an advert in newspapers asking people to share stories about their pets for the book. As a result of the book's success, Cooper and her dogs subsequently made public appearances, including on The Animals Roadshow in 1989. In 1983, she published Animals in War, a book that recorded the contributions a variety of species made to the military. Public response to the book led to a campaign, supported by Cooper, to establish the Animals in War Memorial.

Cooper edited an anthology of prose and poetry entitled The British in Love. With Tom Hartman she also co-edited a dictionary of quotations purely sourced from women entitled Violets and Vinegar. In 2020, some of her writings on sex and marriage from the 1970s were republished as Between the Covers and praised for their honesty.

== Fiction ==
Cooper has been described as "the queen of the bonkbuster"; however, her first novels were romances. These were followed by the Rutshire Chronicles series, where dogs and horses featured heavily. Cooper described the research she undertook for each novel as "like studying for an A-level". Quoted in the Evening Standard in 1994, Cooper stated that she thought that product placement in literary works was acceptable and discussed how she had received thank you gifts as a result of unsolicited mentions in her novels.

=== Romantic novels series ===
Cooper was encouraged to write romantic fiction by the editor Desmond Elliott, who had read the short stories she had written previously for teenage magazines. At the time she was working in publicity for HarperCollins; Elliott commissioned her with a six-book contract and the paperback rights were subsequently sold to Corgi Books. The series sold in the 100,000s. The contract was for Cooper to publish a novel every six months.

The first novel in the series was Emily, which was published in 1975. Set on a remote Scottish island, its storyline follows Emily who moves to the island after a short courtship and marriage to a volatile artist. Reviews were complimentary, although Auberon Waugh noted similarity between Emily and Devil's Cub by Georgette Heyer. The work was compared to that of Nancy Mitford and Barbara Cartland. Emily was followed by Harriet and then Bella, both published in 1976. In Harriet, the titular character becomes pregnant whilst at university and subsequently works as a nanny for an irascible screenwriter so she can take the baby with her. In review, Barbara Cartland disliked the novel. The novel Bella's storyline revolves around an actress whose fiancé is super-wealthy, but his family do not approve of Bella. The novel mixes romance and mystery, as Bella is kidnapped. Auberon Waugh praised the emotional engagement of the novel, but The Guardian described disappointment since good jokes were lost in the prose. In October 1993, seven years after Private Eye had pointed out the similarities, Cooper admitted that sections of Emily and Bella were plagiarised from The Dud Avocado (1958) by Elaine Dundy, but said that it was not deliberate.

The next novel in the series was Octavia, which was published in 1977, set in Britain during the 1970s. Reviews were less positive than the previous novels, but Cooper's word-play continued to be praised. In a review Auberon Waugh expressed frustration with the novel as he felt Cooper could write much better than the text. Octavia was followed by the novel Prudence, which was set in the Lake District in England during a house party. The novel had a mixed reception upon publication, including from one reviewer who hoped it was the last in the series. In response, Cooper's publisher, Desmond Elliott, wrote to the paper announcing that the next novel, Imogen, was due that same year and it too was likely to be enjoyed by hundreds of thousands of readers.

The final novel in the series is Imogen, which was published in 1978. At the time of publication, the preceding five novels had sold 340,000 copies. Set between Yorkshire and the south of France, it follows Imogen as she is seduced by a tennis player, who takes her on holiday, but ultimately falls in love with his best friend. The novel was mostly received favourably, although the character of Imogen was described in one review as "spineless". It is cited as an example in academic texts on a variety of themes, including the allure of the French Riviera for Anglo-American culture, and a cultural analysis of cohabitation in the 1970s. Also grouped in the romance series is the short story collection Lisa & Co; each story is based on some of Cooper's earliest writings for women's magazines in the 1960s.

=== The Rutshire Chronicles ===
The best-known of Cooper's works, each book of the Rutshire Chronicles is set in a glamorous and wealthy milieu, such as the worlds of show jumping or classical music. These books were noted for the luxurious lifestyles portrayed, the proliferation of animals and their wit. The first in the series was Riders (1985), an international bestseller, which sold over one million copies. The first version of Riders was written by 1970, but shortly after Cooper had finished it, she took it with her into the West End of London, but left the manuscript on a bus. The London Evening Standard put out an appeal, but it was never found. She was, she says, "devastated" and it took her more than a decade to start it again. Set in the world of show-jumping, the novel is the first appearance of Cooper's ongoing central character Rupert Campbell-Black. The novel centres on his rivalry with fellow show-jumper Jake Lovell and the novel's denouement is set in the Los Angeles Olympics.

The follow-up novel to Riders was Rivals, set in the world of commercial television. Still featuring Campbell-Black, he joins forces with television presenter Declan O'Hara and other characters to take over the local television station. Despite some initial scepticism from her publisher about the setting, the novel debuted at #2 on the Sunday Times bestseller list for hardback fiction on June 12, 1988. The next novel in the series was Polo, published in 1991, and was a return to the horse-focussed settings that Cooper became known for. Cooper researched the book by travelling to Palm Beach and to Argentina, meeting polo players there. The novel went to number 1 in the UK hardback bestseller list, on its first entry. Based on a rivalry between British polo player Ricky France-Lynch and an American millionaire Bart Alderton, the novel follows the teams associated with the two figures as they compete around the world. It also features Rupert Campbell-Black's illegitimate daughter Perdita as a key protagonist.

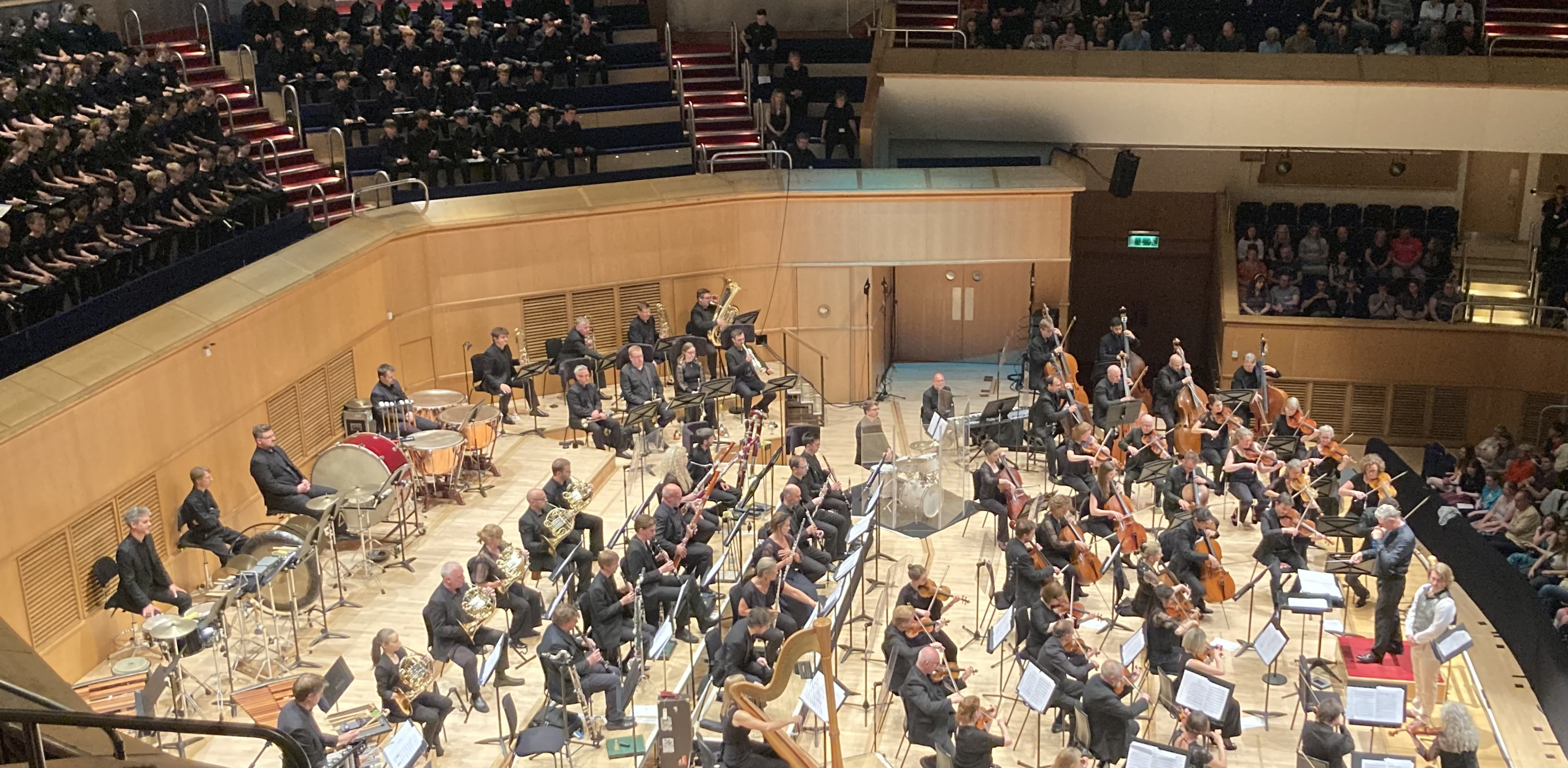
RSNO performing in 2023

Following Polo, the next novel in the series was The Man Who Made Husbands Jealous, which followed the life of Lysander Hawkley, a man who rich women employed to encourage their unfaithful husbands to return to their marriages. It was the first novel to feature Roberto Rannaldini, a conductor and sworn enemy of Rupert Campbell-Black. The novel received a range of reviews, but was praised for its "plain" heroine and a sub-plot relating to miscarriage. The next in the series was Appassionata, which was based in the world of classical music and followed the career of soloist, then conductor, Abigail Rosen. Cooper spent three years researching the novel and travelled on tour to Spain, twice, with the Royal Scottish National Orchestra (RSNO). The novel was a bestseller, and a soundtrack to the novel was released in parallel to the book. Reviews were mixed, with praise for Cooper's research balanced by suggestions that the cast of characters was too large and contrived plots.

Cooper remained largely in the world of classical music for her next novel, Score!, but this time focussing on a production of the opera Don Carlos. In it Rannaldini is directing a film of the production, but is murdered on set, leading to a police investigation. The novel was a Number 1 bestseller upon its release. The book received mixed reviews, as well as the accusation that at some moments the book seemed to suggest "that the death of a dog is rather more grief-worthy than the death of a human". Her following novel Pandora was set in the art world, and followed the Belvedon family of dealers and artists, based in the neighbouring county of Larkshire. Reviewing the novel in The Observer, Robert Macfarlane described how it depicted and lampooned Britart, conceptual art and the Turner Prize. This theme was continued by the New Statesman, where a reviewer described one scene where a woman who is raped is also menstruating as "very Jake and Dinos Chapman". The next volume in the series was Wicked! which was published in 2006 and was set in a boarding school, going to No. 1 in the fiction charts on its release. The novel had mixed reviews with some writers sharing unease at the depictions of teenage sex and romance. The Guardian stated that running at over 800 pages, the book needed a thorough edit since it was "as long as Anna Karenina and that, surely, is a mistake".

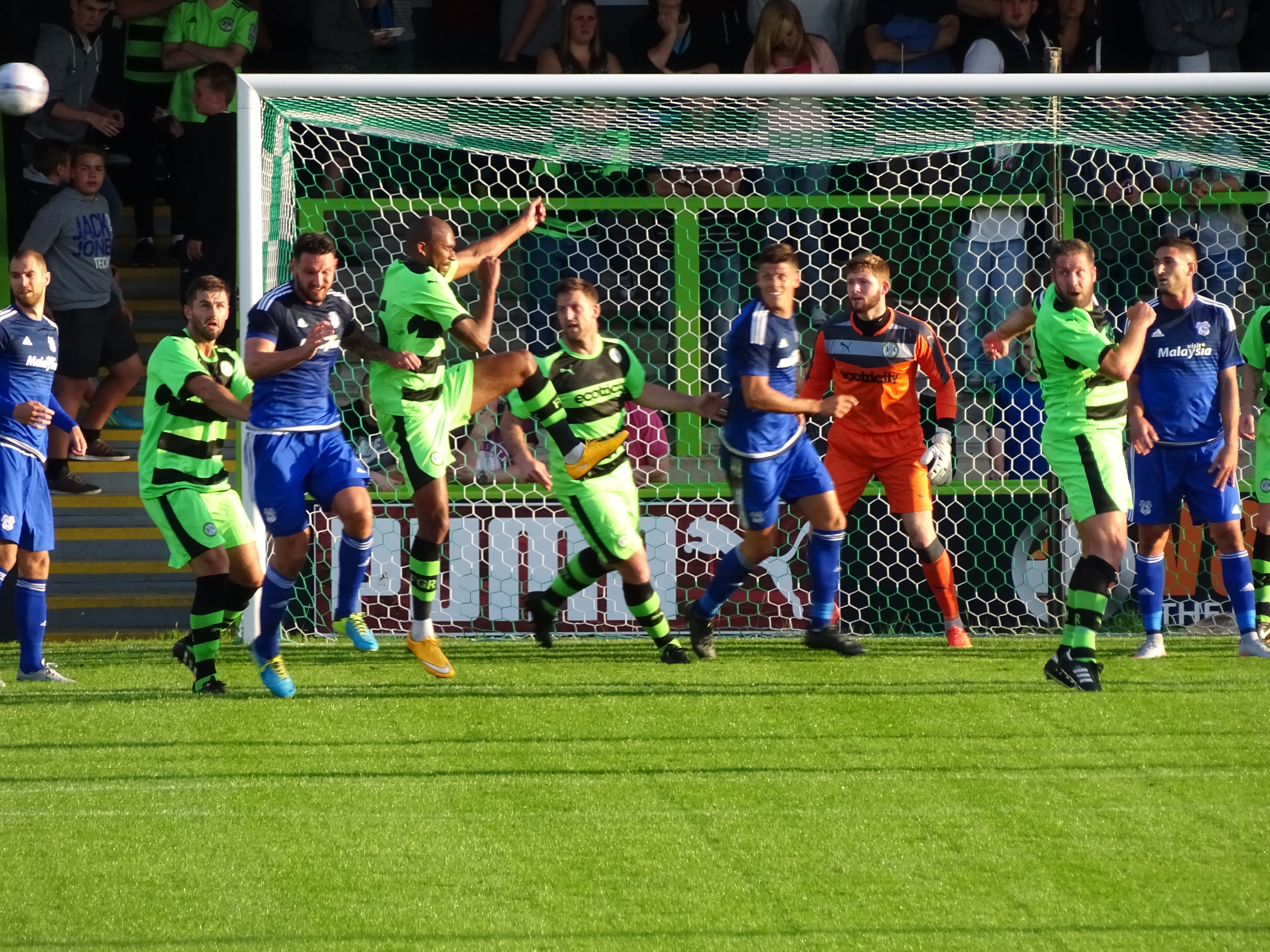
Forest Green Rovers players (in green), 2015

Returning to the world of horses, the ninth novel Jump! was released in 2010. It features characters from the Rutshire Chronicles in the world of National Hunt steeplechase racing and tells the transformation of a mutilated horse (Mrs Wilkinson) into a successful racehorse. After publication, it was revealed that Cooper had named a goat in the book (Chisolm) in order to hit back at the critic Anne Chisholm. The tenth novel in the series Jump! was set in the world of flat racing. Whilst Cooper's descriptions of the Cotswolds and her descriptions of racing were praised, some reviewers criticised the characterisation and "depraved and ridiculous" sex scenes; others instead praised them. The eleventh book in the series was Tackle!, published in 2023 it was set in the world of football. It was named by The Week as one of the best novels of 2023. The novel features Rupert Campbell-Black becoming the director of a local football club, based on Cooper's local side Forest Green Rovers. The sexual content of the novel received mixed reviews, with praise for the oral sex featured, but dismay that other scenes felt "lacklustre".

=== Little Mabel series ===
Cooper also wrote a series of four children's books based on the misadventures of a young mongrel puppy called Mabel. The Little Mabel series comprised Little Mabel, Little Mabel's Great Escape, Little Mabel Wins and Little Mabel Saves the Day. When interviewed in 2013 to discuss the inclusion of a new class for mongrels at Crufts, Cooper described her book Little Mabel Wins as "prophetic" since it featured a protest against mongrel discrimination at that dog show. Two of the books featured in the British children's television series Jackanory, read by Victoria Wood and Liza Goddard.

== Personal life ==
In 1961, she married Leo Cooper, a publisher of military history books. The couple had met when she was aged eight and Cooper aged 10, although they did not marry until she was 24 and he was 27. The couple adopted two children and had five grandchildren. In 1982, the couple left Putney, south-west London, for an old manor house near Stroud, Gloucestershire. As she told The Field in 2002, "I loved London, but I used to cry because I missed the countryside. We did the usual married run: Earl’s Court; Fulham; Putney; Move To The Country." The Coopers' marriage was greatly disrupted in 1990 when publisher Sarah Johnson revealed that she and Leo had had an affair for several years. Leo was diagnosed with Parkinson's disease in 2002. He died on 29 November 2013, at the age of 80.

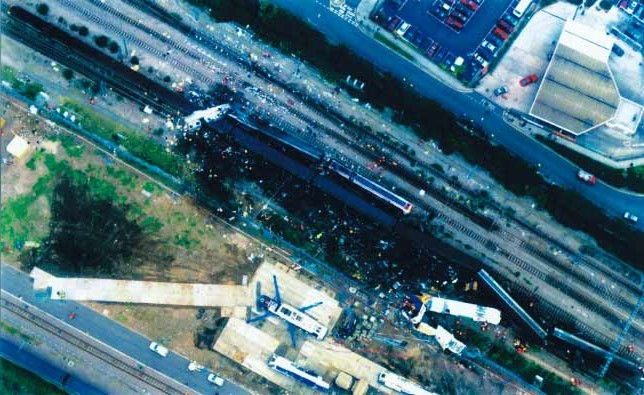
An image of the Ladbroke Grove rail crash as taken by the Metropolitan Police Service

In 2010, Cooper suffered a transient ischemic attack, a form of minor stroke. She received surgery on an artery in her neck and recovered shortly thereafter. Cooper was also a passenger in one of the derailed carriages in the Ladbroke Grove rail crash of 1999, in which 31 people died, and crawled through a window to escape. She later spoke of feeling that her "number was up".

Cooper was a supporter of the Conservative Party, and was also in favour of the Iraq War (2003 to 2011). In a 2007 interview with The Guardian she said, "I loved Mrs Thatcher, I adored her, she was very very nice to me." By 2012, she had grown disillusioned with the Conservatives, telling The Spectator that she was "disappointed with this government" and that the party was "full of terrible people now". In 2018 Cooper said that because of the #MeToo movement, young men and women no longer feel free to flirt with one another and that she enjoyed being the subject of wolf whistles. Cooper stated that she was a football fan and supported Leeds United when she lived in Yorkshire. She was also a Manchester City fan. Cooper campaigned for the preservation of limestone grasslands in Gloucestershire with the Trust for Nature Conservation.

== Death and tributes ==
On 4 October 2025, Cooper was attended to by paramedics after suffering a fall at her home in Bisley, Gloucestershire, which caused a fatal head injury. She was transported to Gloucestershire Royal Hospital, where her condition deteriorated. She died there the next day, aged 88, surrounded by family.

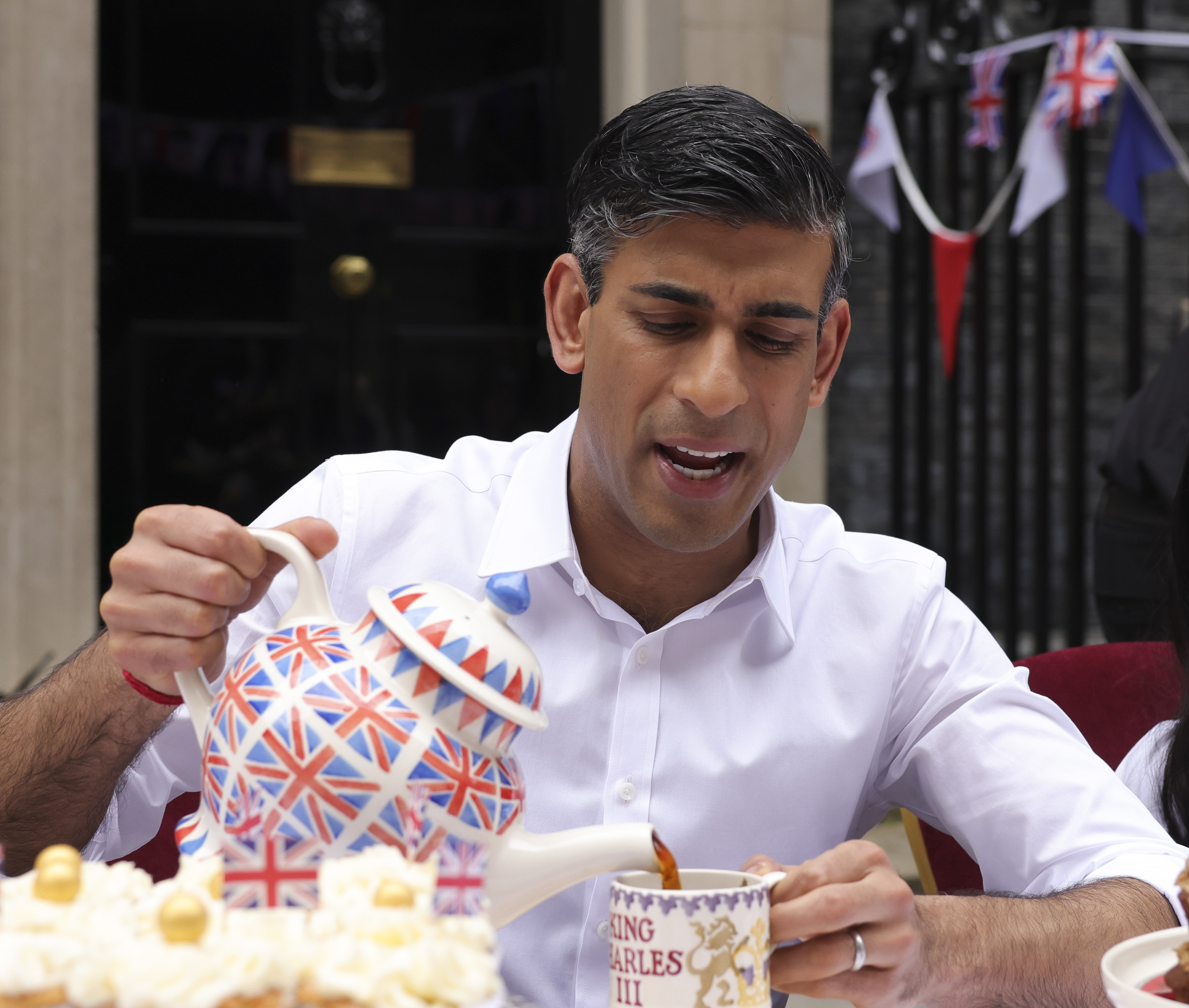
Former UK prime minister Rishi Sunak, one of Cooper's fans

Queen Camilla, a long-term friend, led the tributes to Cooper, describing her as a legend and a "wonderfully witty and compassionate friend to me and so many", adding: "May her hereafter be filled with impossibly handsome men and devoted dogs." The official spokesman of the prime minister, Keir Starmer, said: "Dame Jilly Cooper was a literary force whose wit, warmth and wisdom shaped British culture for over half a century and brought joy to millions." Famously a fan of Cooper's novels, former prime minister Rishi Sunak wrote on X: "Sad to hear of the passing of Dame Jilly Cooper, a storyteller whose wit and love of character brought joy to millions. My thoughts are with her family and fellow readers." Others paying tribute to Cooper included comedian Helen Lederer, who wrote on X: "Trail blazer, wit, optimist and the giver of the greatest summer parties – you made it look simple." Broadcaster Gyles Brandreth wrote that she was "simply adorable".

Television presenter Kirstie Allsopp said Cooper was "a British institution, funny, enthusiastic and self deprecating, we don't see enough of it these days". Piers Morgan posted: "Such a fabulously fun, mischievous, warm-hearted lady. If she was in a room, everyone would feel instantly cheerier." Fellow broadcaster Russell Grant wrote on X: "Jilly was one of the most kind, courteous, generous, warm-hearted and smiley people I ever met when I worked on breakfast and morning TV." Actress Dame Joanna Lumley, who starred in Cooper's early 1970s sitcom It's Awfully Bad for Your Eyes, Darling, told BBC News: "She was entirely generous, hugely talented, prolific, enthusiastic, meticulous and wholly loveable: a darling friend and a brilliant person."

A number of authors have recognised her and her legacy, including Jill Mansell who credited Cooper for inspiring her to be a writer. The Australian-British author Kathy Lette said: "A twinkle has gone out of the world." Author and former doctor Adam Kay recalled being Cooper's "perhaps unlikely penpal", adding: "We have lost one of the greats."

A memorial service was held for Cooper at Southwark Cathedral on 30 January 2026.

== Honours, awards and recognition ==
Cooper was appointed Officer of the Order of the British Empire (OBE) in the 2004 Birthday Honours for services to literature, Commander of the Order of the British Empire (CBE) in the 2018 New Year Honours for services to literature and charity and Dame Commander of the Order of the British Empire (DBE) in the 2024 New Year Honours for services to literature and charity. On 13 November 2009, Cooper was awarded an Honorary Doctorate of Letters by the University of Gloucestershire at a ceremony in Gloucester Cathedral. In 2011, She was also awarded an Honorary Doctor of Letters at Anglia Ruskin University. In 2024 she was named Harper's Bazaar's Author of the Year.

In 1997 local councillors in Ilkley, West Yorkshire, rejected a housing developers' proposal to name a street after Cooper. Located on the site of the tennis courts of Ilkley Hall, where Cooper spent some of her childhood, the street was ultimately named after Thomas Maufe, who was awarded a Victoria Cross. Cooper stated that "[Maufe] is much more deserving than me." A racehorse was named after Cooper, but it had to be euthanised in 2024 after a racing accident.

In 2025, the Jilly Cooper Prize was established as part of the Comedy Women in Print Awards to honour her contribution to comic fiction. The prize recognises works of fiction by women and non-binary authors that demonstrate a distinctive sense of humour, irreverence, and comic narrative voice. The award was introduced following Cooper’s death in 2024, with the intention of acknowledging her influence on contemporary comic fiction and her long-standing reputation for comedic prose, romantic satire, and portrayals of British high society. The inaugural winner of the prize was Sara Pascoe, who received the award in 2025 for her novel Weirdo.

== Film and television productions ==
=== Screenwriting and appearances ===
In 1971 Cooper wrote the comedy series It's Awfully Bad for Your Eyes, Darling with Christopher Bond, about four posh young women sharing a flat in London, featuring Joanna Lumley and airing on BBC1. In the 1980s she was a regular guest on the BBC television programme What's My Line? According to a 2016 interview with Cooper, she was also the subject of a Spitting Image puppet, whose only line was "Sex sex sex sex sex sex".

=== Adaptations ===
==== Romance series ====
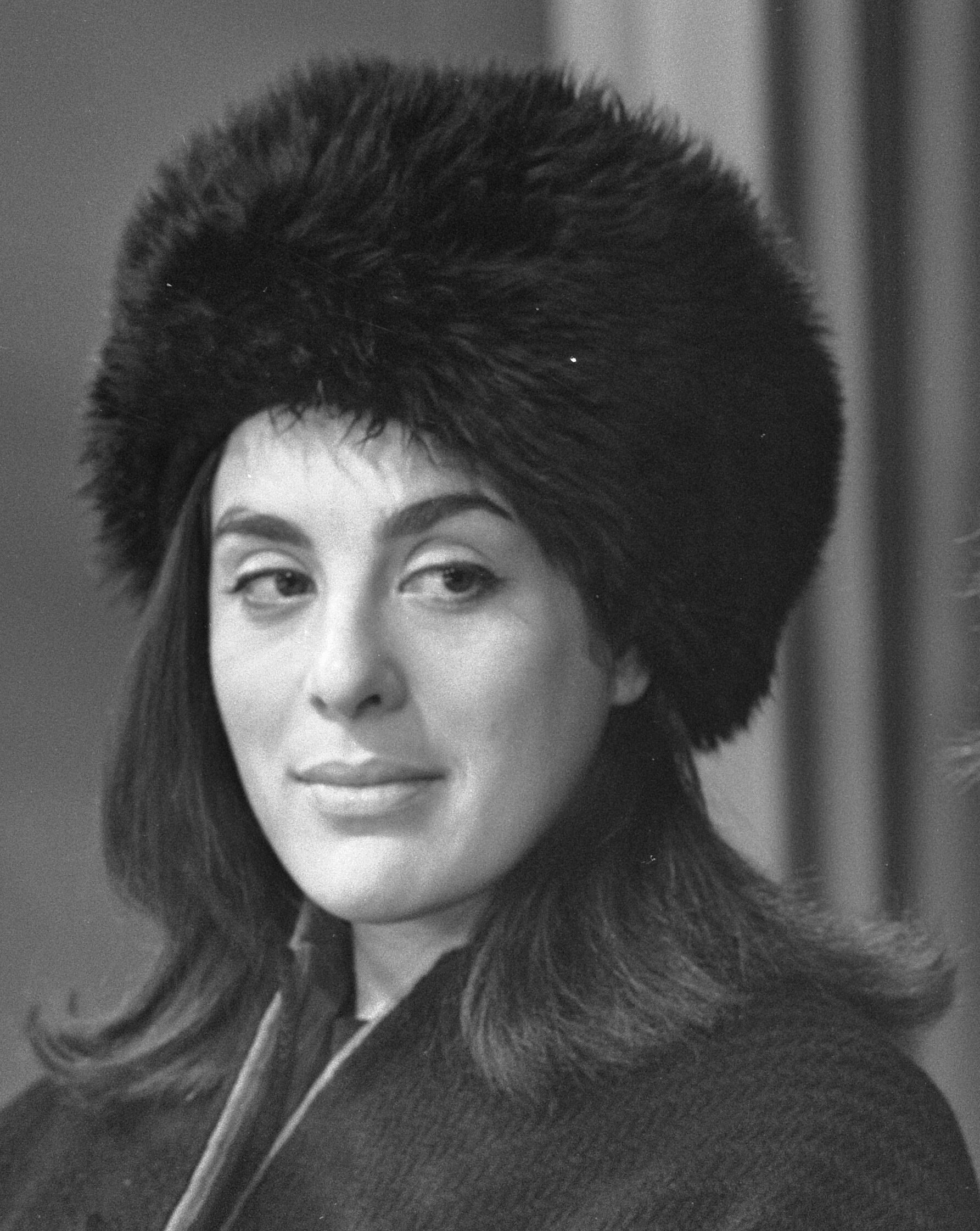
Eleanor Bron, 1968

Emily was adapted by Eleanor Bron for Thames Television in 1976 as part of a six-part romance series. Directed by Alastair Reid, it was broadcast on 6 April 1977. Prudence was adapted for radio in 1979 by Capital Radio, starring Felicity Kendal as Prudence, alongside Nigel Davenport and Gerald Harper.

In 2007 a television adaptation of four of the romance novels was proposed. This was suggested as one of a four-part series focusing on Harriet, Bella, Octavia and one unspecified; the only episode to be filmed was Octavia. The screenplay was written by Jonathan Harvey. As of 2009 there was no date for its screening. In 2013 The Telegraph reported that Harriet was being adapted into a musical by Eva Rice, novelist and daughter of Tim Rice.

==== Rutshire Chronicles ====
Television adaptations of Cooper's novels were produced for ITV and Disney+. Other productions include the television mini-series The Man Who Made Husbands Jealous, starring Hugh Bonneville, produced by Sarah Lawson; Riders; and, in 2024, Rivals, starring David Tennant, Aidan Turner and Alex Hassell, produced by Eliza Mellor. The latter was renewed for a second series, which was released in May 2026.

== Analysis ==
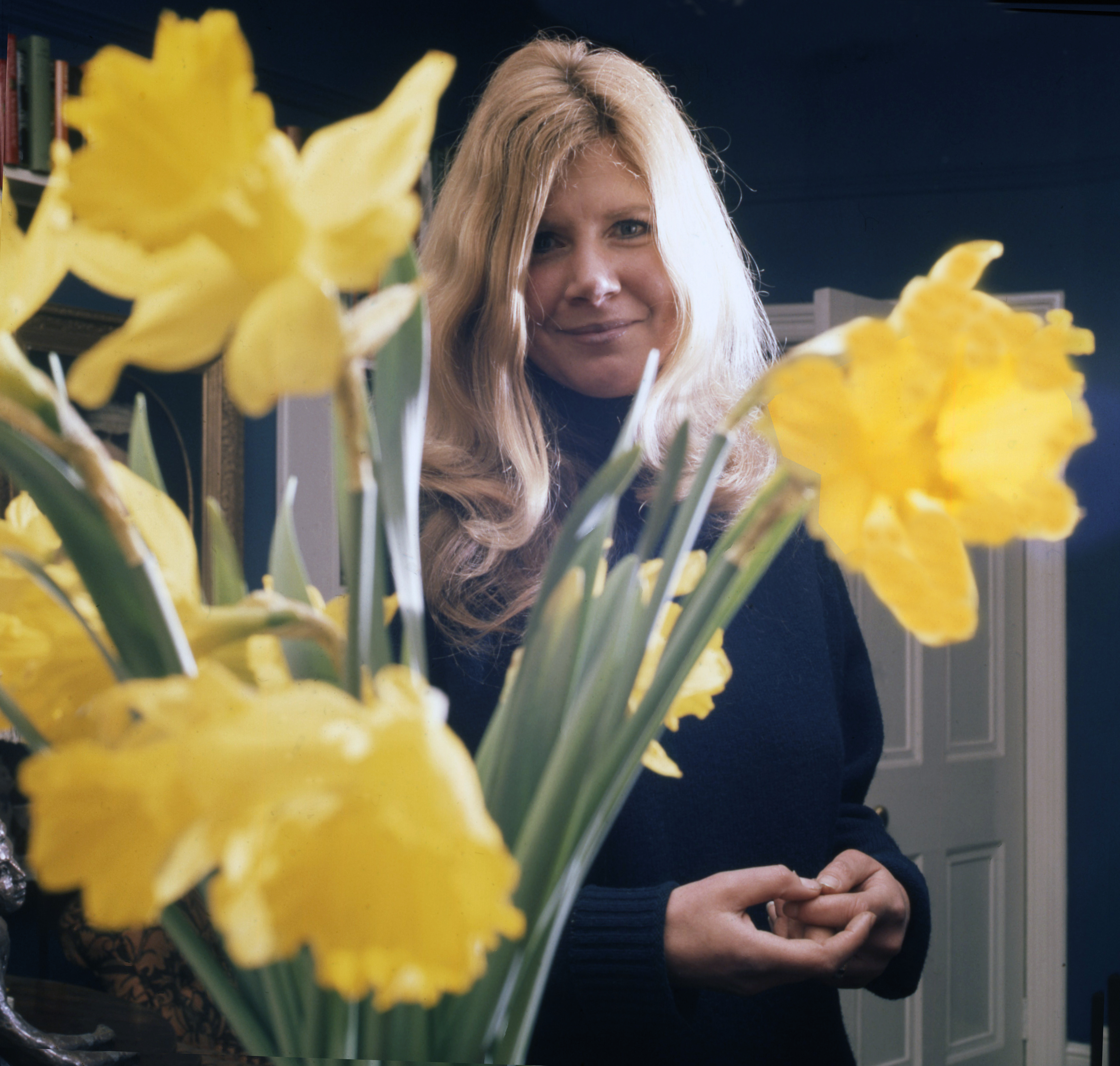
Jilly Cooper, 1975

Cooper has been identified as one of the key writers of the bonkbuster novel, along with Jackie Collins, Shirley Conran and Judith Krantz. Riders in particular is seen as a key text for the genre, embodying its themes of sex (sometimes coercive) and romance (sometimes unfulfilled). Indeed, academic Emma Parker has described how the novel "exemplified" the genre. Ian Patterson, writing for the London Review of Books is one of the few academics to seriously consider Cooper's literary oeuvre. In his critique of her work, Patterson described how Cooper had a "propensity for subplots worthy of Trollope or Dickens". Moreover, that her books are "worth thinking about" because they cover "pleasure, that most ticklish of subjects".

Patterson goes on to describe the themes of pleasure that Cooper deals with: "pleasure delayed and deferred, guilty pleasure, the pleasure of repetition and the problems of it", as well as "good pleasures, in various degrees, wrong but permissible pleasures, and unequivocally bad pleasures". He praised Cooper's use of language, in particular "puns and other forms of verbal humour", which give the reader the impression that Cooper, as writer, is never far away. On the Romance series, Patterson described the novels as "tightly structured, agreeably predictable wish-fulfilment narratives named for their heroines". Beyond Cooper's novels, Patterson praised her portrait of Margaret Thatcher, and her Sunday Times columns. Patterson compared Cooper to Ali Smith since in their writing they share a "fondness for both wordplay and wise children".

Cooper's use of humour as part of erotic writing has been discussed by Tim Miles, who described how there "is little or no separation" of the two, especially in Riders. In his analysis of the career of Mary Ward, academic Alan Deyermond describes how she was described as "the Jilly Cooper of her day", which became part of her professional denigration. Cooper's use of horses as a repeated trope across many of her novels has been considered by academic Gail Cunningham, who described how Riders and Polo provided "women readers with an adult version of the pony book".

== List of works ==
=== Fiction ===
==== The Rutshire Chronicles ====
1. Riders (1985)
2. Rivals (1988; also known as Players)
3. Polo (1991)
4. The Man Who Made Husbands Jealous (1993)
5. Appassionata (1996)
6. Score! (1999)
7. Pandora (2002)
8. Wicked! (2006)
9. Jump! (2010)
10. Mount! (2016)
11. Tackle! (2023)

==== Romances ====
1. Emily (1975)
2. Bella (1976)
3. Harriet (1976)
4. Octavia (1977)
5. Prudence (1978)
6. Imogen (1978)
7. Lisa & Co. (1981)

==== "Little Mabel" series ====
1. Little Mabel (1980)
2. Little Mabel's Great Escape (1981)
3. Little Mabel Wins (1982)
4. Little Mabel Saves the Day (1985)

==== Other ====
1. Araminta's Wedding (1993)

=== Non-fiction ===
- How to Stay Married (1969)
- How To Survive from Nine To Five (1970)
- Jolly Super (1971)
- Men and Super Men (1972)
- Jolly Super Too (1973)
- Women and Super Women (1974)
- Jolly Superlative (1975)
- Supermen and Superwomen (1976)
- How to Survive Work and Wedlock (1977); republication of earlier works
- Superjilly (1977)
- The British in Love (1979)
- Class: A View from Middle England (1979)
- Supercooper (1980)
- Violets and Vinegar: An Anthology of Women's Writings and Sayings (1980)
- Intelligent and Loyal (1981)
- Jolly Marsupial (1982)
- Animals in War (1983)
- The Common Years (1984)
- On Rugby (1984; with Leo Cooper)
- On Cricket (1985; with Leo Cooper)
- Hotfoot to Zabriskie Point (1985; with Patrick Lichfield)
- Horse Mania! (1986; with Leo Cooper)
- How To Survive Christmas (1986)
- Turn Right at the Spotted Dog (1987)
- Angels Rush In (1990)
- Between the Covers (2020)
