= Jack Sheffield =

British author (born 1945)

Jack Sheffield (born Jack Linley, 1945 in Leeds) is a British author who wrote a series of novels about the headmaster of a school in a fictional Yorkshire village. The stories are set from the late 1970s to the early 1980s and attempt to portray life in Yorkshire as it was at that time.

He grew up in Gipton in Leeds, trained as a teacher at St John's College, York and later became head teacher of two schools in North Yorkshire and then senior lecturer in primary education at Bretton Hall. He took up writing after retirement, and his first novel Teacher, Teacher! sold 100,000 copies. In 2016 he was awarded the honorary title of Cultural Fellow of York St John University.

== Books ==
- Teacher, Teacher! (2007)
- Mister Teacher (2008)
- Dear Teacher (2009)
- Village Teacher (2010)
- Please Sir! (2011)
- Educating Jack (2012)
- School's Out (2013)
- Silent Night (2013)
- Star Teacher (2015)
- Happiest Days (2017)
- Starting Over (2018)
- Changing Times (2019)
- Back To School (2020)
- School Days (2021)
- Last day of School (2022)
- University Tales (2023)
- University Challenges (2024)
- University Secrets (2025)
