= Mount! =

2016 novel by Jilly Cooper

- Author: Jilly Cooper
- Working title: Leading Sire; Flat Racing
- Language: English
- Series: Rutshire Chronicles
- Release number: 10
- Genre: Romance, crime, bonkbuster
- Set in: 21st-century
- Published: Transworld (2016)
- Publisher: Transworld
- Publication date: 8 September 2016
- Publication place: United Kingdom
- Preceded by: Jump!
- Followed by: Tackle!

Mount! is a 2016 novel by English author Jilly Cooper. It is the tenth book in the Rutshire Chronicles series. The plot centres on Rupert Campbell-Black's efforts to have his horse Love Rat named as leading sire, which forces him to travel the world, putting a strain on his marriage to Taggie. To research the novel, Cooper spoke to a range of people, including trainers Robert Cowell, Mark Prescott and Henry Cecil.

The cover of the novel was criticised pre-release, with suggestions that it looked "50-Shadesian". Whilst the novel received mixed reviews, with criticism focussed on its treatment of non-consensual sex and characterisation, Jenny Colgan, reviewing the novel stated that what readers really look to Cooper's books for is "joy ... daft, silly, boozy joy, and if you like joy, you’ll like this".

== Plot ==
Set in the world of horse racing, Rupert Campbell-Black is a trainer who wants his horse Love Rat to be awarded the title of leading sire. To achieve this, Campbell-Black must travel the world, racing Love Rat's progeny with the aim to win as many trophies as possible. Travel puts a strain on his marriage to Taggie Campbell-Black, who stays behind at their home, Penscombe, where Campbell-Black has his racing yard. Also at home is his elderly father Eddie, who requires full-time care; he is attended to first by Gala Milburn then by Jan van Deventer, both of whom tempt both Rupert and Taggie to be unfaithful.

== Background ==
Mount! was published in 2016 and is the tenth novel in the Rutshire Chronicles series by Jilly Cooper. The working title had been Flat Racing. It is 640 pages. The novel is set in the world of flat racing; another working title was initially Leading Sire - however this was changed to a title more recognisable to audiences. To research the background for the novel she met many racehorse trainers, including Robert Cowell, Mark Prescott and Henry Cecil. She consulted the former jockey Richard Hills, and visited studs, including Dalham Hall Stud. She also visited Tattersalls sales ring. She also read Wild Ride by Ann Hagedorn Auerbach, which is set in the racing world in Kentucky.

== Cover ==
Alison Flood, writing in The Guardian, described Mount's cover as "50-Shadesian" depicting as it does a man in tight jodhpurs, holding a whip with a bulging crotch. Other readers commented on how the boots used in the photoshoot looked "cheap"; although others suggested they were more like those traditionally worn by jockeys.

== Characters ==
- Rupert Campbell-Black
- Love Rat (a racehorse)
- Gavin Latton
- Gala Milburn
- Cosmo Rannaldini

== Reception ==
The novel was released on 8 September 2016. The launch was held at the Mandarin Oriental in Knightsbridge and was attended by Cooper's "real life Ruperts" (Rupert Campbell-Blacks); they were Andrew Parker Bowles, Rupert Lycett Green and Michael Howard, Earl of Suffolk. The party was also attended by a stallion, that guests were invited to feed polo mints to.

The Yorkshire Post viewed the novel as "an escapist romp". Jenny Colgan, reviewing the novel also in The Guardian described how it had "less sex than usual" and that whilst it was less compelling than Rivals that did not matter because what readers really look to Cooper's books for is "joy ... daft, silly, boozy joy, and if you like joy, you’ll like this". Ian Patterson, writing in the London Review of Books, described how in Mount! the exposition on "arcane rules of racing" is done "unobtrusively". He also praised the "verbal exuberance" of Cooper's writing in it.

Orlando Bird, writing in The Telegraph described the novel as "ramshackle in execution" and that it was missing much of the shrewdness that characterised Cooper's earlier novels such as Rivals. Bird does admit that Cooper does sometimes address this, with phone-hacking and plot points related to going viral; at other times Bird describes how Cooper is out of touch, for example using Babar the Elephant as a cultural touchstone for young people. Bird also criticised some of the sex scenes, with a sexual assault in a nursing home being neither sexy, nor funny. Bird suggests that perhaps, with this novel, Cooper was trying to address ageing and its related issues, but missed the mark somewhat. The Stuff also criticised the book's casual racism.

Lili Radloff of News 24 praised Cooper's descriptions of the Cotswolds and her descriptions of racing, Radloff found the returning characters one dimensional, too much anthropomorphism and "depraved and ridiculous" sex scenes. She reflected that if Rupert Campbell-Black were to be launched as a character today, he would not be tolerated, and that whilst the novel is "sometimes suspenseful and regularly quite funny", the lack of characterisation was its downfall. In 2017 Glamour magazine tested sex scenes from Mount! and three other bonkbusters, to test whether the scenes were enjoyable in real life. A scene with Rupert Campbell-Black which focuses on him giving oral sex was chosen to feature.
