= Rupert Campbell-Black =

- Rutshire Chronicles character
- Rupert Campbell-Black portrayed by Alex Hassell in Rivals
- First appearance: Riders
- Created by: Jilly Cooper
- Portrayed by: Marcus Gilbert; Alex Hassell

In-universe information
- Full name: Rupert Edward Algernon Campbell-Black
- Occupation: Variously: showjumper, politician, TV executive, horse trainer, football club owner
- Affiliation: Conservative Party
- Spouse: Helen Macauley; Taggie O'Hara
- Children: Perdita Macleod; Marcus, Tabitha, Xavier and Bianca Campbell-Black
- Home: England

Rupert Edward Algernon Campbell-Black is a fictional character in the Rutshire Chronicles, a series of romance novels written by Jilly Cooper. He also appears in the film and television adaptations of Riders and Rivals. The character is based on several real-life men, including Michael Howard, the Earl of Suffolk and Andrew Parker Bowles. The character is a central figure in four novels in the series: Riders, Rivals, Mount!, and Tackle!. Physically depicted as tall, handsome and blond, the character has a range of qualities, including cruelty to women and animals, but can also be tender. In 1986 the Irish Independent described Campbell-Black as "over-privileged, overbearing and too fond of chasing women". The character was portrayed by Marcus Gilbert in the 1993 film adaptation of Riders, and by Alex Hassell in the 2024 adaptation of Rivals.

== Background ==
First conceived as a character in 1970, Cooper has acknowledged that the character of Campbell-Black was inspired by several men: the 11th Duke of Beaufort; Andrew Parker Bowles, the former husband of Queen Camilla; Michael Howard, the 21st Earl of Suffolk, and Rupert Lycett Green. Cooper described Parker Bowles as "beautiful, blond and stunning". Howard reputedly enjoyed being known as inspiration for Campbell-Black, answering his telephone with "It's Rupert here" and claiming to be the "real" figure the character was based on.

== Character ==
Campbell-Black features to greater and lesser extents in all eleven books of the Rutshire Chronicles. In terms of appearance he is described as tall, blonde haired and blue-eyed with a Greek nose and high cheekbones. At school, reputedly reflecting the size of his penis, his nickname was "Campbell-Black-and-Decker". It was also described as similar to a baseball bat. Cooper describes him repeatedly as "the handsomest man in England", he has also been described as "criminally handsome", as well as the "byword for upper-class cad". His fictional country house, Penscombe, is located in the Cotswolds.

Educated at Harrow, Campbell-Black's brutality towards women is blamed on neglect from his aristocratic parents and being educated at boarding school. The character is also noted for his cruelty, beating up a hunt protestor and almost killing his horse in Riders. He is variously described as charming, yet narcissistic, competitive, but with some tenderness. However in the 1993 adaptation of Riders that sensitivity of character was removed. His first appearance is in the novel Riders, which follows the lives of show-jumpers in Britain and Europe. Much of the novel centres on a rivalry between Campbell-Black and another rider, Jake Lovell, whom he bullied at school. Campbell-Black also abuses some of his horses, including one called Macauley. That horse is named after Campbell-Black's first wife, Helen Macauley, who he marries in the novel. At the end of Riders he wins an Olympic gold medal as part of the team show jumping event.

After Riders he appears in all subsequent Rutshire Chronicles novels; in the later books, Campbell-Black is described as a "former playboy". In Rivals Campbell-Black has been elected a Conservative MP, and is Minister for Sport. In Appassionata, Campbell-Black and his wife Taggie adopt two children from South America. Whilst his character was central to both Riders and Rivals, and appeared in all others, a novel did not focus on him again until 2016's Mount! In it his travelling and eventual cheating puts his marriage to Taggie at risk. He is also the central character in Tackle! where he becomes the owner of a football team.

== Appearances ==
- Riders (1985 novel) and its 1993 film adaptation (played by Marcus Gilbert)
- Rivals (1988 novel) and its 2024 television adaptation (played by Alex Hassell)
- Polo (1991 novel)
- The Man Who Made Husbands Jealous (1993 novel)
- Appassionata (1996 novel)
- Score! (1999 novel)
- Pandora (2002 novel)
- Wicked! (2006 novel)
- Jump! (2010 novel)
- Mount! (2016 novel)
- Tackle! (2023 novel)

== Reception ==
As a trope of a romantic hero, Campbell-Black's behaviour in Riders has been criticised. Sex induces anxiety in his wife Helen, who he describes as a "frozen chicken" in bed. Later in the book, Helen is trapped in a foursome with Rupert, Billy and Billy's wife Janey, where Helen is terrified and struggles to escape. Rupert and Helen's marriage, like that in other bonkbusters, is "characterized by a lack of intimacy". Upon publication of the novel Riders in 1985, the Hartlepool Mail described the creation of the "ruthless ladykiller" Campbell-Black as some of Cooper's "best work". The Irish Independent described Campbell-Black as "over privileged, overbearing and too fond of chasing women".

With the 1988 publication of the novel Rivals, The Stage described the character as "awful". In 1993 Cooper confirmed that she regularly received fan mail addressed to Campbell-Black. Liz Ryan, on reviewing his appearance in the 1996 publication of Appassionata, described the character as a "ghastly lothario". Alison Flood, writing in The Guardian in 2012, cautioned for how the character might age in subsequent books, stating that she was not likely to want to read about a "skirt-chasing octogenarian".

Reflecting on Campbell-Black's character in 2016, The Irish Times described him "managing over 20 years' worth of fidelity to the saintly Taggie ... has resulted in him having to land the title as The World's Biggest Bastard in every other area of his life". The article defines "Being a Bastard" as "volcanic rage, mad jealousy, vicious, intergenerational rivalries, being staggeringly rude and having massive, childish strops over nothing". It goes on to say that despite this women of every age would sleep with him, as well as most gay men. Sarah Manning, writing in Red in 2016, described how Campbell-Black said "such offensive things that he makes Nigel Farage look like a member of the Socialist Workers' Party". Kelly Ana Morey of Stuff, when reviewing Mount!, was critical of the timelines of Campbell-Black's life, stating that according to their calculations if he turned 60 in that novel, he would have had to have impregnated the mother of his first child, Perdita, when he was fourteen; something that does not correlate with the chronology in other books. Nevertheless Tabitha Lasley, writing for Esquire in 2022, described Campbell-Black's presence across the series as: "In a rapidly changing world, full of upstarts and arrivistes, RC-B is the one constant." In a 2024 interview Cooper suggested that Tackle! might be the final book to feature him.

== Portrayals ==
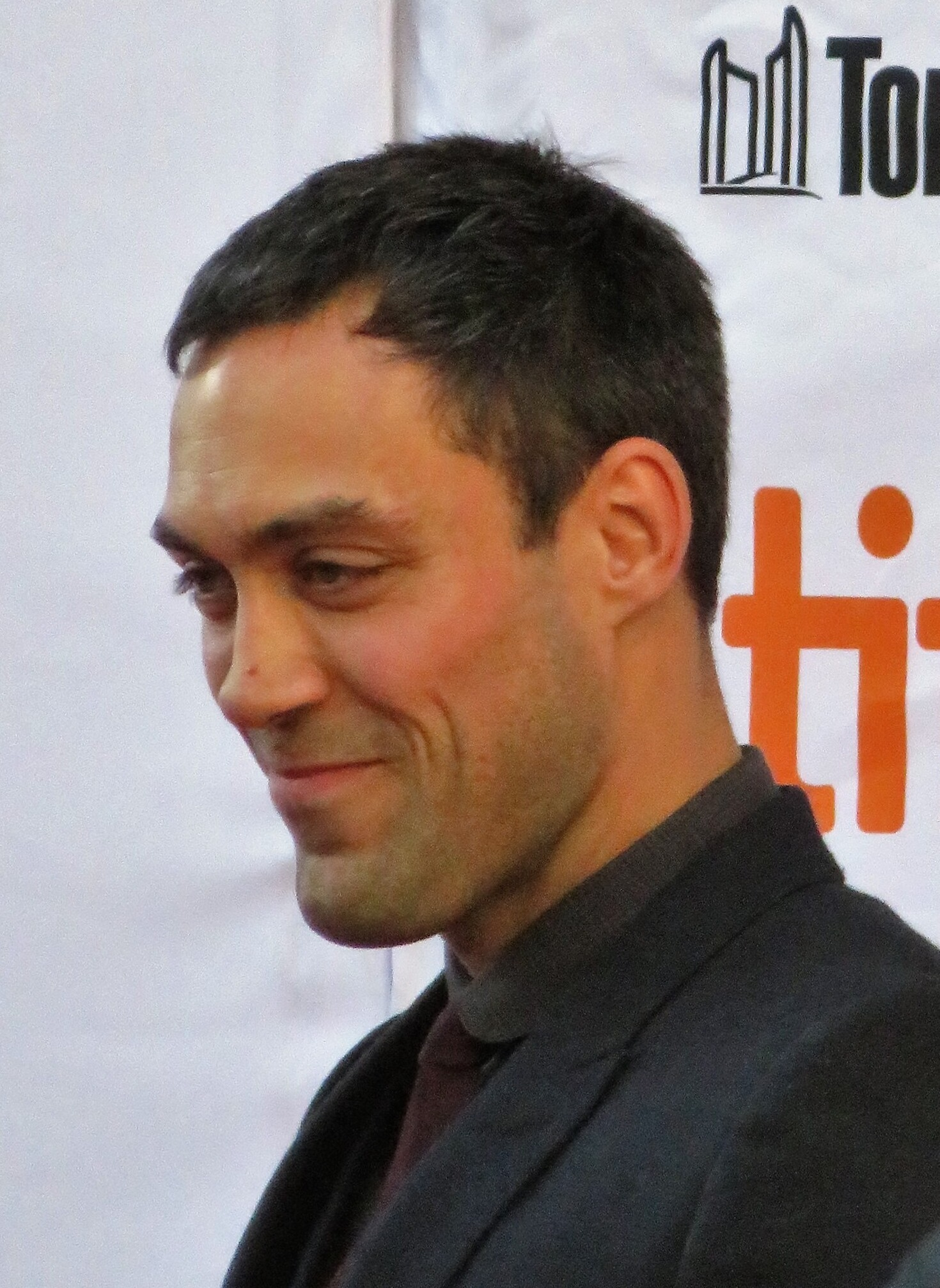
Alex Hassell plays Campbell-Black in Rivals

After the 1993 adaptation of Riders, where Campbell-Black was played by Marcus Gilbert, Cooper noted that she would find it hard to return to the originality of Campbell-Black's character, after watching the on-screen version. Described as an "out-and-out baddie" by the West Lancashire Evening Gazette, Gilbert expressed disappointment that the character he played had been over-simplified. However he also described the character as "the most evil" he'd ever played. In response to his portrayal in the 2024 series of Rivals, where he is played by Alex Hassell, Serena Smith, writing for Dazed, described him as a "reformed fuckboy". He also marries Taggie O'Hara in the novel, and writing in 2024, Cosmopolitan described how their relationship felt romantic until the reader remembered the age difference and power dynamic between them. In the 2024 adaptation, Alex Hassell was cast as Campbell-Black, with this casting garnering criticism that he was not blonde and blue-eyed, but dark haired and dark-eyed. In 2025 a BBC writer described the character as "having charisma that made Harry Styles look downright unpopular".

== Cultural influence ==
=== Literature ===
References to Rupert Campbell-Black are found in several other novels, including the book club based A Moment on the Lips at Christmas, where a character's husband role-plays as Rupert. There's a further reference in Veronica Henry's How To Find Love in a Bookshop, where Campbell-Black is described as "a beast". Others references are found in The Day We Disappeared by Lucy Robinson, Four Christmases and a Secret by Zara Stoneley, amongst others.

=== Internet ===
Several threads on Mumsnet fantasise not just about Campbell-Black but also about a life in the fictional Rutshire more generally. In the forum Campbell-Black is referred to as RCB. Journalist Caitlin Moran described this phenomenon as "vaginally totemic". After the release of the 2024 series, creators and audiences on TikTok responded warmly to the sexual tension between Campbell-Black and Taggie O'Hara; clips of their romance have been viewed millions of times.
