= Appassionata (novel) =

Bonkbuster based on orchestral life

- Author: Jilly Cooper
- Language: English
- Series: Rutshire Chronicles
- Subject: Classical music
- Genre: Romance, bonkbuster
- Set in: 20th-century England
- Published: 1996 (Bantam Press)
- Publisher: Bantam Press
- Publication date: 1996
- Publication place: United Kingdom
- Pages: 622
- ISBN: 978-0-552-14459-9
- Preceded by: The Man Who Made Husbands Jealous
- Followed by: Score!

Appassionata is a 1996 novel by British author Jilly Cooper. The Rutshire Chronicles bonkbuster follows the career of violinist Abigail Rosen, who survives a suicide attempt and goes on to reinvent herself as a conductor. Her first job is for the fictional Rutminster Symphony Orchestra. The novel then follows the lives of several other characters, including horn player and ultimate love interest Viking O'Neill, as the fortunes of the orchestra itself dip.

Despite being a bestseller, the novel was subject to mixed reviews. Whilst Cooper referred to it as her "sex and Chopin" novel, and reviewers praised her detailed research into orchestral life, others criticised the plot and characterisation. Its release was accompanied by a compilation of music from the novel. The film rights were acquired in 2016.

== Plot ==
The novel is centred around the career of violin soloist Abigail Rosen, nicknamed L'Appassionata ('the passionate one'). After she discovers her married manager, with whom she was having an affair, was also having an affair with another woman, Rosen attempts to take her own life. The novel follows her recovery and her steps to forge a new career in the world of conducting. Her first job as conductor is with Rutminster Symphony Orchestra, who are hostile to her at the beginning, but ultimately fight to protect her. As Rosen's career rises, she becomes engaged to pianist Marcus Campbell-Black, son of Rupert. However, Marcus is gay and has an affair with a Russian ballet dancer. In parallel, the fortunes of the orchestra are falling, and they face a challenging future, including a takeover and merger, initiated by Roberto Rannaldini. The finale is set at the fictional Appleton Piano Competition, which Marcus wins despite an almost fatal asthma attack, the orchestra uses to see off the merger. In the aftermath Rosen finds romantic happiness with the horn player Viking O'Neill.

== Background ==
Cooper spent three years researching the bonkbuster. As part of her research, she went on tour to Spain, twice, with the Royal Scottish National Orchestra, thanking their conductor, Walter Weller, in the acknowledgements. She also spent time with the City of Birmingham Symphony Orchestra, the London Symphony Orchestra, and at the Leeds Piano Competition. Speaking shortly after publication Cooper explained that she had wanted to write a novel about orchestral life since "musicians ... lead such romantic lives ... really know how to party ... but they recover from horrendous hangovers in time to play the most incredible music". Cooper brought back the characters of Rupert Campbell-Black and Roberto Rannaldini.

It is 622 pages long. It was published in 1996. It is the fifth book in Cooper's Rutshire Chronicles series.

== Characters ==
- Abigail Rosen
- Viking O'Neill
- Marcus Campbell-Black
- Flora Seymour
- Rupert Cambell-Black
- Roberto Rannaldini

== Reception ==
The novel was a bestseller. A CD and cassette tape of music referred to in the novel was also released at the same time as the book.

Cooper referred to the book as her "sex and Chopin" (Note: A pun on "sex and shopping".) novel. The Sunday Independent described the plot of the novel as "naughty romps and vicious rivalries going on in orchestra pits". Her research into orchestral life was praised by Christopher Morley writing in the Birmingham Evening Post, describing how the research "stiffens a novel as frothy as champagne", going on to say the novel is "sexy and tender" and educational about the experiences of musicians. BBC Music magazine described it as a "compelling novel". Malcolm Hayes, writing in The Independent, described how it was a return to the humorous form of Riders, with less sex than Polo.

The Oadby & Wigston Mail reviewed the novel as "containing less sex than her other novels, [it] lacks the over-characterisation which made her other novels such fun to read". Melanie Campbell-Alexander, writing in Country Life, described the novel as "an enjoyable read" but felt that the cast of characters was too large. Liz Ryan, writing in the Evening Herald, described the novel as "like the wet dreams of a cider-swigging schoolboy", adding that the plot was contrived and the dialogue clichéd. The Irish Times described the characters as being "without redemption" and the reviewer did not understand why anyone would purchase one of Cooper's novels.

Former British Prime Minister Rishi Sunak claimed in May 2023 that Appassionata, along with other Cooper novels, were his favourite books.

== Adaptation ==
In 2016 the film rights for Appassionata and eight other novels were acquired by the production company FilmWave.
