= Score! (novel) =

Novel by Jilly Cooper

- Author: Jilly Cooper
- Language: English
- Series: Rutshire Chronicles
- Release number: 6
- Genre: Crime fiction, bonkbuster
- Set in: 20th-century Rutshire (a fictional English county)
- Published: 1999 (Transworld)
- Publisher: Transworld
- Publication date: 1999
- Publication place: United Kingdom
- ISBN: 978-0-552-15636-3
- Preceded by: Appassionata
- Followed by: Pandora
- Website: https://www.jillycooper.co.uk/books/score/

Score! is a 1999 novel by British author Jilly Cooper, that is part of the Rutshire Chronicles series. It is both a bonkbuster and a murder mystery, set during the filming of the Verdi opera Don Carlos. It focuses on the murder of conductor Roberto Rannaldini during filming, and the subsequent spate of violence. The novel was Cooper's first attempt at crime fiction and as part of her research she visited film sets and spoke to police. It received mixed reviews, especially in terms of its expansive plot that mixed genres, as well as its attitudes to rape and sexual violence, with Tanya Gold describing how they are treated as footnotes to the plot.

== Plot ==
The plot revolves around the life and death of Roberto Rannaldini, a famous conductor with a reputation for being evil and manipulative. One of his ambitions is to conduct a film of the Verdi opera Don Carlos, which is filmed at his mansion, Valhalla. The director of the film is his godson, Tristan de Montigny, who (unlike everyone else) believes Rannaldini to be good. The film is financed by Venturer - the television production company established by Rupert Campbell-Black and Declan O'Hara in a preceding novel, Rivals. As filming becomes more acrimonious, Campbell-Black is forced to become more involved.

In parallel, Rannaldini intends to seduce Campbell-Black's daughter, Tabitha, who is also his step-daughter since Rannaldini married Rupert's ex-wife, Helen. Meanwhile, Tristan and Tabitha have an affair, and Rannaldini in revenge tells Tristan that he is the child of an incestuous relationship. Despite many people wishing Rannaldini dead, people are shocked when he is murdered, and there are several potential suspects. The murders continue after Rannaldini's death and the investigation, led by the police, ultimately leads to the discovery that the murderer was cast member Rozzy Pringle. To find the culprit, Tristan collaborates with make-up artist Lucy Latimer, and the two become romantically involved by the end of the novel.

== Background ==
Published in 1999, the novel is a bonkbuster and murder mystery set during the filming of Don Carlos, an opera by Giuseppe Verdi. It is the sixth book in the Rutshire Chronicles series; its character list is eight pages long. The plot revolves not just around the filming of the opera, but also around the murder of Roberto Rannaldini – its conductor. It was Cooper's first attempt at crime fiction, and was initially intended to be a much shorter novel, around 150 to 200 pages. As part of her research she visited two film sets and spoke to police in Stroud, England.

== Characters ==
- Roberto Rannaldini
- Tabitha Campbell-Black
- Rupert Campbell-Black
- Tristan de Montigny
- Lucy Latimer

== Reception ==
The novel was a Number 1 bestseller upon its release. It received mixed reviews: Olivia Laing, writing in The Guardian described the novel as a turning point in Cooper's work. However, Laing's husband, Ian Patterson, writing for the London Review of Books, suggested that the book has an overly complex plot and that its "attempt to mingle whodunnit, thriller, Gothic and romance into a Gesamtkunstwerk of all the genres" is not successful. Cooper herself described how, after her editor insisted on the removal of 75,000 words, she was "unsure of the balance of the book". She also stated that her research was not deep enough for the length of the book.

The Wolverhampton Express & Star found her formula tired, and the cast of characters too familiar, although the anonymous reviewer did state that it would "doubtless sell thousands". Bob Williams, writing in the Beverley Guardian described it as "emotional potpourri". Tanya Gold, writing in the New Statesman describes how the heroine, Lucy Latimer, is described as a "mother-figure" in the novel, and that the crimes in it – of rape and alleged murder - are made footnotes to the wider plot. This complaint that the rape and sexual violence is not taken seriously enough is echoed by Christine Barker writing in the Birmingham Daily Post, who also said that at some moments the book seemed to suggest "that the death of a dog is rather more grief-worthy than the death of a human".
