= Jump! (novel) =

Novel by Jilly Cooper

- Author: Jilly Cooper
- Language: English
- Series: Rutshire Chronicles
- Genre: Romance, bonkbuster
- Set in: 21st-century England
- Published: 2010 (Transworld)
- Publisher: Transworld
- Publication place: United Kingdom
- Pages: 739
- Preceded by: Wicked!
- Followed by: Mount!
- Website: https://www.jillycooper.co.uk/books/jump/

Jump! is a 2010 novel by English author Jilly Cooper. It is the ninth novel in the Rutshire Chronicles series. The plot follows the racing career of a one-eyed horse called Mrs Wilkinson, who is rescued by widow and grandmother Etta Bancroft. She forms a syndicate to race Mrs Wilkinson with others from her village and the novel follows them to major National Hunt races at Aintree, Cheltenham and the Grand National. Despite extensive research, Cooper struggled to write the novel, due to her husband's and her own ill health. The book received positive reviews, with some reservations. Reviewer Olivia Laing praised Cooper's "near-magical ability to conjure up a world", but criticised the underage, non-consensual sex as well as some of the novel's multiple side plots.

== Plot ==
Widow and grandmother Etta Bancroft rescues a horse that she finds abandoned near her home in Rutshire. Known as Mrs Wilkinson, the one-eyed racehorse turns out to have impeccable bloodlines and the village, including Etta, forms a syndicate to race her. Mrs Wilkinson races at Aintree and Cheltenham, and at the close of the book wins the Grand National. In parallel to Mrs Wilkinson's racing career, the novel follows the lives of new and recognisable Cooper characters, including Etta, who falls in love with millionaire ex-footballer Valent Edwards, and Rupert Campbell-Black, whose grandson is a talented jockey. Another plotline follows Amber Lloyd-Foxe, daughter of Rupert's dead best friend Billy Lloyd-Foxe, as she works to succeed in a career as a jockey, facing sexism along the way, whilst she rides Mrs Wilkinson.

== Background ==
The novel was published in 2010 and is the ninth bonkbuster in the Rutshire Chronicles series. It is 739 pages. Set in the world of National Hunt racing, as research for the book Cooper visited the trainer Paul Nicholls and met horses Denman and Kauto Star. She also joined a women-only racing syndicate, "Thoroughbred Ladies", whose horse Island Flyer is trained by Tom George. She also visited Highclere Thoroughbred Racing, and met Jodie Kidd. However, Cooper found the novel challenging to write, describing how she compared it to Riders and feeling that it did not live up to her earlier work – she even offered to pay the publisher back their advance, convinced as she was that it was a poor effort. During the course of writing the novel her husband Leo Cooper was diagnosed with Parkinson's disease, and she broke both her wrist and a finger, all of which slowed her progress.

== Characters ==
- Mrs Wilkinson (a rescued racehorse)
- Etta Bancroft
- Valent Edwards
- Amber Lloyd-Foxe
- Rupert Campbell-Black

== Reception ==
The novel sold 125,000 hardback copies in the UK. Katie Jarvis, writing in Cotswold Life, described how the book was given good reviews from both The Guardian and the Times Literary Supplement. Jess Cartner-Morley celebrated the publication of the novel. Olivia Laing, reviewing the novel in The Observer, described the novel as one where Cooper almost returns to the same form as her earlier books, but doesn't quite reach it. Laing ascribes this to an "overblown" cast, with some side-quests that distract the reader, rather than amplify the world Cooper created. An example Laing gives of this relates to a side plot featuring a jockey who is also connected to Al-Qaeda. Nevertheless, Laing does recommend the novel to readers, citing Cooper's attention to detail and her "near-magical ability to conjure up a world" as reasons to enjoy the writing. More than sex, Laing argues that Cooper's novels are about class in England, and cites Jump! as a primary example of this, especially anti-middle-class-ism. Laing did not find some sex scenes erotic, since they were underage and non-consensual. Cooper later reflected on the difficulty she had in writing them, especially those involving elderly people.

The novel has been compared to A Year at the Races by Jane Smiley, which focuses on racing culture in Kentucky, USA.

In the novel Cooper also named a goat after the writer Anne Chisholm, who twenty years previously had reviewed Rivals and revealed spoilers about the plot. Chisholm in Jump! is (according to Cooper) a "very nice goat".

== Portrait of Mrs Wilkinson ==
Artist Michelle McCullogh created a portrait of the fictional character Mrs Wilkinson after reading a copy of Jump! sent to her by Cooper. Cooper later purchased the painting from the artist.
