= Pandora (Cooper novel) =

Novel by Jilly Cooper

- Author: Jilly Cooper
- Language: English
- Series: Rutshire Chronicles
- Release number: 7
- Genre: Bonkbuster
- Set in: 21st-century England
- Published: 2002 (Transworld)
- Publisher: Transworld
- Publication date: 2002
- Publication place: United Kingdom
- Pages: 558
- ISBN: 978-0-552-15640-0
- Preceded by: Score!
- Followed by: Wicked!
- Website: https://www.jillycooper.co.uk/books/pandora/

Pandora is a 2002 novel by English writer Jilly Cooper. It is the seventh novel in the Rutshire Chronicles series. Set in the art world, the book follows the career of Raymond Belvedon, who whilst a young army officer in the Second World War, steals a painting called Pandora. The painting is later stolen from his family home and the novel follows the cast as they locate the painting. The denouement of the novel is a record-breaking sale at Sotheby's with the sale of Pandora as the centrepiece. Quentin Letts described the novel as Cooper "back on nostril-flaring, leg-splaying top form", whilst Robert Macfarlane described the novel's sexual activities as usually simple and happy, where "mutuality of orgasm is a given".

== Plot ==
The book follows the career of Raymond Belvedon, who, whilst a young army officer in the Second World War, steals a painting called Pandora. The fictional painting is by Raphael and is kept by Belvedon over the subsequent years, hanging in the bedroom of his home after he married Czech artist Galena Borochova. There the painting witnesses Borochova's infidelities and the births of their four children: Jupiter, Alizarin, Siena and Jonathan.

The book continues when the children are adults, when a supposed fifth sibling appears, Emerald Cartwright, whose presence upsets Raymond and the siblings. Emerald's boyfriend, Zachary Ansteig, had been looking for Pandora, as it was stolen from his family's chateau. During a fireworks display, the painting is stolen, and the novel follows the cast as they locate the painting. The denouement of the novel is a record-breaking sale at Sotheby's with the sale of Pandora as the centrepiece.

== Background ==
Published in 2002, it is the seventh novel in the Rutshire Chronicles series. It is set in the art world. It is 558 pages long. In preparation for the novel, Cooper researched the art world. The novel features many new characters, but also features returning ones, such as Rupert Cambell-Black. It is set in the fictional county of Larkshire, neighbouring Cooper's other fictional county, Rutshire.

== Characters ==
- Raymond Belvedon
- Galena Borochova
- Siena Belvedon
- Zachary Ansteig
- Rupert Campbell-Black

== Reception ==
Reviewing the novel in The Observer, Robert Macfarlane described how it depicted and lampooned Britart, conceptual art and the Turner Prize. This was elaborated on by Wendy Holden, writing in the New Statesman, who described one scene where a raped woman is also menstruating as "very Jake and Dinos Chapman". John Preston, writing in Modern Painters, described this aspect of the novel as "very thick-eared satire on the contemporary art scene". Writing in the Sunday Independent, Patricia Deevey praised the pastiche of the art world as a "smart portrait of [its] venal, greedy and pretentious underbelly". Deevey's most expansive praise was for the crowd scenes, that skillfully keep the reader appraised of the action; Deevey compared them to "tracking shots in a Robert Altman film".

Quentin Letts, writing in The Standard, referred to how reviews for her previous two novels had been "sour", but with Pandora Cooper was "back on nostril-flaring, leg-splaying top form". Holden also discussed how the novel was not politically correct - and that political incorrectness is a hallmark of a Cooper novel. Helena Bertodano, reviewing the book in The Telegraph, described as "absolute piffle, but vastly enjoyable piffle nonetheless".

Reviewers who discussed the sexual content were Macfarlane, who commented on how the novel has an increased ratio of sex per page than her earlier novel Riders, and that the sex is usually simple and happy, where "mutuality of orgasm is a given". He also pointed out that in Pandora there's a far greater range of sexual activities described than in other Cooper novels, that are not just vaginal penetration by a penis. In contrast, Deevey described the amount of sex scenes as "modest" and that they had substantial meaning for the plot.

== Cover ==
For its paperback release, the cover was redesigned to a "clean, striking new image" and this was praised by Sarah Broadhurst writing in The Bookseller.
