= Wicked! =

2006 novel by Jilly Cooper

- Author: Jilly Cooper
- Language: English
- Series: Rutshire Chronicles
- Genre: Bonkbuster
- Set in: 21st-century England
- Published: 2006 (Transworld)
- Publisher: Transworld
- Publication place: United Kingdom
- Pages: 848
- Preceded by: Pandora
- Followed by: Jump!
- Website: www.jillycooper.co.uk/books/wicked/

Wicked! A Tale of Two Schools is a 2006 novel by English writer Jilly Cooper. It is the eighth book in the Rutshire Chronicles series. The novel is based on the interactions of staff and pupils of two schools in the fictional county of Larkshire, the private school Bagley Hall and the state-run Larkminster Comprehensive. Students include "Feral" Jackson, a Larkminster pupil whose mother is a drug addict, and Paris Alvaston, who lives in care. Rupert Campbell-Black also features as a pupil, when he takes a bet that he cannot pass GCSE English. Cooper undertook extensive research in preparation for the book, visiting both state and independent schools. The novel received positive reviews, with Mary McCarthy stating that "a solid dose of low brow, high quality, vintage Cooper is just what a girl needs".

== Plot ==
The novel is based on the interactions of staff and pupils of two schools in the fictional county of Larkshire. The schools in question are the private school Bagley Hall and the state-run Larkminster Comprehensive. The schools create a partnership to generate a tax break for Bagley Hall, when Larkminster is threatened with closure. Janna Curtis, the head teacher of Larkminster wants to save the school and to do so collaborates with Bagley's Hall's head teacher Hengist Brett-Taylor, who also finds her sexually attractive. Larkminster gets access to Bagley Hall's resources, and students of different social classes get to know one another. The two schools put on a production of Romeo & Juliet together. Students include "Feral" Jackson, a Larkminster pupil whose mother is a drug addict, and Paris Alvaston, who lives in care. Both are gifted: Feral at sport and Paris at literature. Bagley Hall pupils include Cosmo Rannaldini, son of Roberto who featured in previous novels, as well as Dora Belvedon, who becomes Paris' girlfriend, and Rupert Campbell-Black's children, Xavier and Bianca who were adopted from Colombia. Rupert also features as a pupil, when he takes a bet that he cannot pass GCSE English.

== Background ==
Wicked! is the eighth novel in the Rutshire Chronicles series by Jilly Cooper. The book is 848 pages. Due to be delivered to the publisher in December 2004, Cooper took four years to write the novel, and her research involved visiting schools, interviewing teachers and school inspectors, as well as sitting in on lessons with students. In an interview with The Telegraph she described visiting six private schools, and a dozen comprehensive schools. Two of the private schools were Dean Close School and St Paul's; she described the head teachers of both, Rev. Tim Hastie-Smith and Martin Stephen, as mentors. She also received advice from Dennis Silk, former Warden of Radley College, and spoke to former students from Brighton College, Bryanston School and St Mary's, Calne. Cooper also taught English classes herself, at Barnwood Park School, to experience something of what being a teacher was like. She set up a literature prize at the latter. She also read memoirs of children in care to research Paris Alveston's story line, these included The Golly in the Cupboard by Phil Frampton and The Looked After Kid by Paolo Hewitt.

== Characters ==
- Janna Curtis
- Hengist Brett-Taylor
- Paris Alvaston
- 'Feral' Jackson

== Reception ==
The novel went to number 1 in the fiction charts on release. Reviewing the book for Raidió Teilifís Éireann, Mary McCarthy stated that "a solid dose of low brow, high quality, vintage Cooper is just what a girl needs". She also described that is less of a bonkbuster than Cooper's previous novels, with surprise that there was no sex until page 170. Alison Flood, writing in The Guardian also noted the change in sexual tone, explaining that romance between school children did not have "the glamour of stable-bound romances". Cooper also commented on this when the book was published, describing how characters "almost" got to bed often but little actual "getting to bed". Tim Martin, reviewing it in The Independent suggested that teenagers having sex would make adult readers feel uncomfortable. It is the first novel of Cooper's to have a character put on a condom; this was suggested by the copy editor. Cooper then described writing a sex scene where a condom is put on as not coming naturally to her. Joanna Briscoe, reviewing the work in The Guardian stated that the 800+ page book needed a thorough edit since it was "as long as Anna Karenina and that, surely, is a mistake". That said, Briscoe praised its frothy humour and portrayal of young people.

== Analysis ==
Phil Frampton, an author who formerly lived in care, reviewed the novel and although found some assertions trite, described its impact on how readers understand children in care should be a "big plus". The portrayal of teachers in the book has been studied by both Gary McCulloch and Sophie Mills. McCulloch using Wicked! as an example of how veteran teachers can be dismissed as 'Dinosaurs' in literature. Mills mentions Wicked! in analysis of the portrayal of Classics teachers.
