= Riders (1993 film) =

British television film

- Based on: Riders by Jilly Cooper
- Screenplay by: Charlotte Bingham; Terence Brady
- Directed by: Gabrielle Beaumont
- Starring: Marcus Gilbert; Michael Praed; Arabella Holzbog
- Music by: Roger Webb
- Country of origin: United Kingdom
- Original language: English

Production
- Running time: 199 minutes
- Production company: Anglia Films

Original release
- Network: ITV
- Release: 2 May 1993

Riders, also called Jilly Cooper's Riders, is a 1993 British television film based on Jilly Cooper's 1985 book of the same name in the Rutshire Chronicles series.

With a length of 199 minutes, broadcasters usually divide the production into a miniseries.

== Outline ==
Rupert Campbell-Black (played by Marcus Gilbert) is a rich and upper class Englishman at the top of the world of international show jumping, while his arch-rival Jake Lovell (Michael Praed) is a man of humble gipsy origins now funded by his Sloane Ranger heiress wife Tory (Caroline Harker). Lovell is driven by an intense hatred of Campbell-Black, who had bullied him mercilessly as a small boy at their English prep school, and their fights over riding prizes and women reach a climax at the Los Angeles Olympics.

== Cast ==
- Marcus Gilbert as Rupert Campbell-Black
- Michael Praed as Jake Lovell
- Arabella Tjye as Helen Macaulay
- Caroline Harker as Tory Lovell
- Anthony Calf as Billy Lloyd-Foxe
- Belinda Mayne as Lavinia Greenslade
- Brenda Bruce as Granny Maxwell
- Sienna Guillory as Fenella Maxwell
- John Standing as Malise Gordon
- Timothy Morand as Humpty Hamilton
- Gabrielle Beaumont as Lady Roxborough
- Gareth Hunt as a commentator
- Annabel Giles as Grania Pringle
- Kay Callard as Nanny Campbell-Black
- Stephanie Beacham as Molly Carter
- Anthony Valentine as Colonel Carter
- Andrew Hall as Nigel
- Cécile Paoli as Laura Duparru
- Serena Gordon as Janey Henderson
- Ian Hogg as Dudley Drabble

== Production ==
Anglia bought the film rights to the book, and hired Charlotte Bingham and her husband Terence Brady to produce a script, giving the job of director to Gabrielle Beaumont. The latter also had a cameo as Lady Roxborough. Some sequences were filmed at Heydon, Norfolk. Actors were taught to ride by Life Guards officer Richard Waygood. This was the screen debut of Sienna Guillory, only sixteen at the time, chosen largely because her part called for a young actress who could ride.

== Reception ==
The film had an intense build-up as "a sex sizzler" in the weeks before its first broadcast on the ITV network on 2 May 1993, but some critics found it absurd. Writing in The Independent, Allison Pearson said: "Jilly Cooper's Riders (ITV), allegedly about mounting excitement, came with palpitating publicity. But it was all sound and furry animals, dignifying nothing." She continued by mocking Anthony Calf's portrayal of Billy Lloyd-Foxe: "I was trying to place Calf's acting style (do horses give you lockjaw?) when he turned up in the Gold Blend advert. All that rich, roasted alliteration is enough to drive anyone to suicide, which he wisely attempted in part two, only to have Rupert revive him ('England needs you, Billy'). Similarly John Lyttle, writing for the same newspaper, described it as a "peculiarly joyless romp".

The strapline used on the present-day DVD cover, "Sex and horses: who could ask for more?" is indeed from The Sunday Telegraph, but was a comment on the book Riders in 1985, and not on the film.

== Aftermath ==
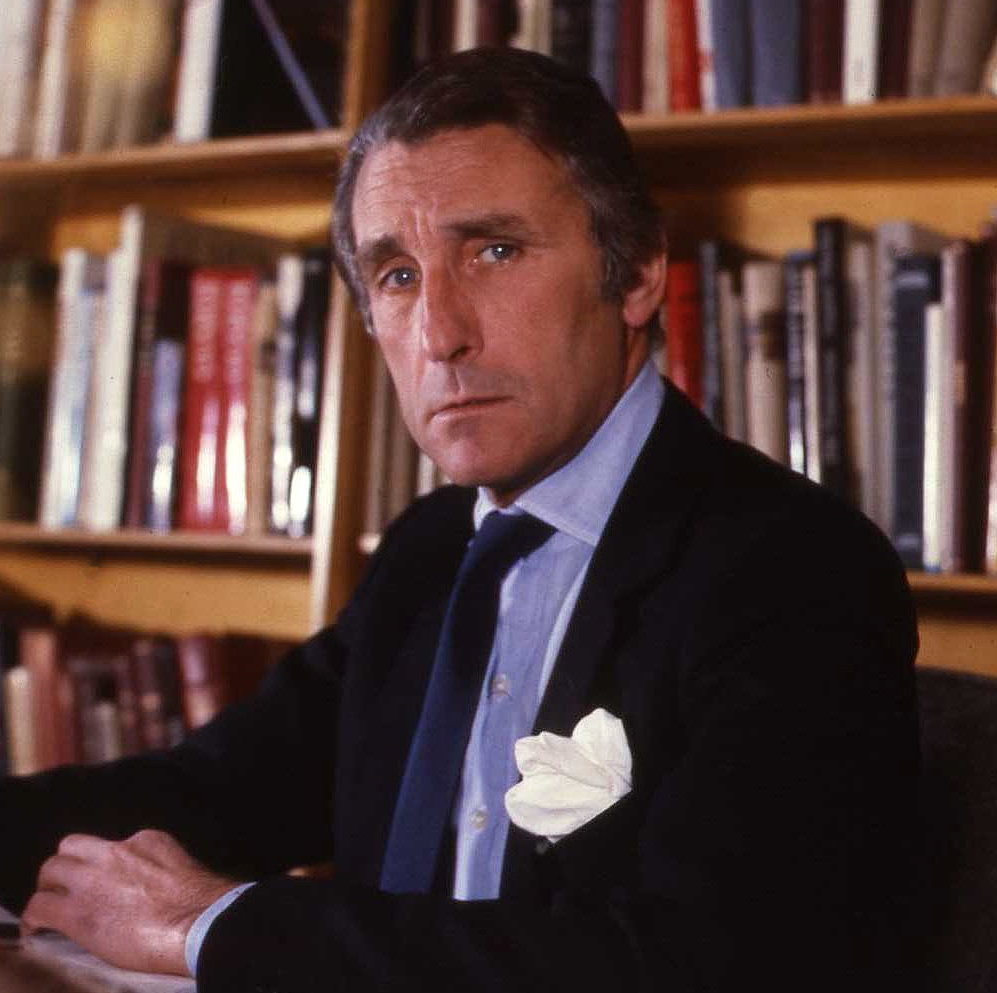
The Duke of Beaufort

In 2002, Jilly Cooper revealed that Rupert Campbell-Black was a composite of Andrew Parker Bowles, Rupert Lycett Green, Michael Howard, 21st Earl of Suffolk, and the 11th Duke of Beaufort, commenting on their place in the development of Campbell-Black: "a wildly dashing and exciting group, and their bravery and charisma were the essential elements... his shittiness was entirely my invention".

Rowan Pelling has suggested in The Daily Telegraph that the outrageous Fleet Street columnist Janey Lloyd-Foxe is based on Jilly Cooper herself and the young Camilla Parker-Bowles.

== See also ==
- 1993 in British television
- The Man Who Made Husbands Jealous
