= Anne Chisholm =

British journalist and biographer

Anne Chisholm OBE FRSL
- Born: 28 July 1940 (age 86)
- Occupations: Journalist; biographer
- Spouse: Michael Davie (m. 1975)
- Children: 1 (adopted)
- Writing career
- Genre: Biography

Anne Chisholm OBE FRSL (born 28 July 1940) is a British journalist and biographer. She worked as a staff member at Time and The Observer, and has worked as a critic for the Sunday Telegraph. She has written biographies including Nancy Cunard (1979), Lord Beaverbrook: A Life (1992), Rumer Godden: A Storyteller's Life (1998), and Frances Partridge: The Biography (2009).

== Biography ==
Anne Chisholm was born on 28 July 1940. Her journalism career started at Private Eye before she worked as a staff member at Time and The Observer and as a critic for the Sunday Telegraph. In response to Chisholm's 1988 The Spectator negative review that exposed spoilers for the novel Rivals, its author Jilly Cooper named Chisolm, a fictional goat in her 2010 novel Jump!, after her; Chisholm said of the incident: "On the whole, Cooper's revenge could have been a great deal worse. And all publicity is good publicity." She has also worked as an editor and reader for Jonathan Cape and Bloomsbury Publishing, as well as a judge for the 1993 Booker Prize and the V.S. Pritchett Short Story Prize.

In July 1972, Chisholm released Philosophers of the Earth, where she interviewed several ecologists to "bridge the gap between the professional ecologist and the interested layman". She has also written several biographies, with her first being Nancy Cunard (1979), and the next being Lord Beaverbrook: A Life (1992), Rumer Godden: A Storyteller's Life (1998), and Frances Partridge: The Biography (2009). She once published Faces of Hiroshima (1985), centred on the Hiroshima Maidens. She also published an edited volume of the letters of painter Dora Carrington.

Chisholm was a 2003 Visiting Fellow at the University of Texas British Studies programme, and has also worked as an organiser for two Arvon Foundation writing courses. She has also served in the Royal Society of Literature's council, as well as a vice president.

In 1989, Chisholm was awarded Fellow of the Royal Society of Literature. At the 2015 New Year Honours, she was awarded Officer of the Order of the British Empire "for services to literature".

In 1975, Chisholm married Michael Davie, for whom she worked as an assistant at The Observer's Pendennis column and who later became editor of The Age. The couple had an adopted son – her nephew Jesse, who Chisholm adopted after her sister, Jesse's mother, died in 1973 when Jesse was four. Jesse later died in a car collision in January 2002, aged 32. He was the father of Team GB skeleton Winter Olympic gold medallist Tabitha Stoecker. Chisholm also had three step-children from Davie's previous marriage.

== Works ==
- Philosophers of the Earth (1972) (Note: Reviews of this book:)
- Nancy Cunard (1979) (Note: Reviews of this book:)
- Faces of Hiroshima (1985) (Note: Reviews of this book:)
- (with Michael Davie) Lord Beaverbrook: A Life (1992) (Note: Reviews of this book:)
- Rumer Godden: A Storyteller's Life (1998) (Note: Reviews of this book:)
- Frances Partridge: The Biography (2009) (Note: Reviews of this book:)
- (ed.) Carrington's Letters: Her Art, Her Loves, Her Friendships (2017) (Note: Reviews of this book:)
