= Tackle! =

Novel by Jilly Cooper

- Author: Jilly Cooper
- Language: English
- Series: Rutshire Chronicles
- Genre: Romance, bonkbuster
- Set in: 21st-century England
- Published: 2023 (Transworld)
- Publication place: United Kingdom
- Preceded by: Mount!
- Website: https://www.jillycooper.co.uk/books/tackle/

Tackle! is a 2023 novel by English author Jilly Cooper. It is the eleventh novel in the Rutshire Chronicles series and the last to be published prior to the author's death. It sees the return of Rupert Campbell-Black, this time as the owner of a low division football club, whose fortunes he reverses. The idea for the novel came after Cooper had lunch with football manager Alex Ferguson. The team in the book, Searston Rovers, is based on Cooper's local side Forest Green Rovers. Despite some incredulity at the plot, Rachel Cooke described Cooper's style as "infectiously joyful and funny about her particular brand of very English writing: it comes with a kindliness and a silliness that is beginning to feel to me quite painfully nostalgic". Cleo Watson, writing in The Telegraph, compared the novel to Welcome to Wrexham and Ted Lasso. It was named by The Week as one of its Top Ten Books of 2023.

== Plot ==
Taggie Campbell-Black has breast cancer, her husband is not coping well, and her daughter Bianca wants a reason to come home to look after her mother. Bianca is in a relationship with footballer Feral Jackson, and so persuades her father Rupert Campbell-Black to take over a low division football team and sign Feral to it. The novel then follows the rise of the side, Searston Rovers, who benefit from Rupert's involvement and eventually end up playing at Wembley.

== Background ==
Published in 2023, the novel is the eleventh title in the Rutshire Chronicles series by Jilly Cooper. Set in the world of football, as part of her research for the book Cooper spoke with football managers Tony Adams, Kenny Dalglish and Alex Ferguson. The idea for the novel apparently came after Cooper had lunch with Ferguson years previously. Cooper was given a tour of the St George's Park National Football Centre by Howard Wilkinson; he also introduced her to Gareth Southgate. The team in the book, Searston Rovers, is based on Cooper's local side Forest Green Rovers. She travelled with the team to Wembley in 2016, where they were beaten by Grimsby Town.

According to Rachel Cooke, writing in The Guardian, publication was delayed both by sensitivity readers and by an editor who wanted the book to include more sex; it took Cooper 15 months to complete the rewrites. Cooper herself stated that she had found writing sex scenes more difficult as she grew older. She also suggested in an interview with Saga that this novel would be the last to feature Rupert Campbell-Black and his wife Taggie.

== Characters ==
- Rupert Campbell-Black
- Taggie Campbell-Black
- Feral Jackson
- Dora Belvedon

== Reception ==
The book launch was held at Hatchard's in London in November 2023. Upon publication of the book Gareth Southgate sent her a signed England national football team shirt by way of congratulations. Rachel Cooke, reviewing the novel in The Guardian, described a paucity of sex scenes compared to Cooper's earlier novels, and those that were there she described as "lacklustre". Cooke did praise the oral sex that the novel featured. Clare Thorp, reviewing the book for BBC Culture, described the sex as "tamer" than previous works. Moira Redmond, reviewing the novel in The i Paper described the sex scenes as "sweetly raunchy" and praised Cooper for her invention of "Glittoris" - a liquid painted on a clitoris that tasted sweet to those that (find and) taste it. Additionally, Hilary Rose, writing in The Times was charmed by the puns that Cooper uses to describe sex. She also praised the "restraint" shown in Cooper's treatment of Taggie Campbell-Black's breast cancer treatment.

Redmond also stated that although there was an audience of older women waiting to read the bonkbuster, it might also appeal to a younger generation of readers. Despite these positives and what she terms as Cooper's "dashing style, joie de vivre and glittering view of the world", Redmond was critical of Cooper's portrayal of feminists and their depiction in her novels, and some fatphobic writing. Despite some incredulity at the plot, Cooke described Cooper's style as "infectiously joyful and funny about her particular brand of very English writing: it comes with a kindliness and a silliness that is beginning to feel to me quite painfully nostalgic". Cleo Watson, writing in The Telegraph, compared the novel to Welcome to Wrexham and Ted Lasso. She also said she felt "bereft" when she finished reading it.

== Recognition ==
Tackle! was named by The Week as one of its Top Ten Books of 2023.
