= Donna Gould =

Australian cyclist

Personal information
- Born: 10 June 1966 (age 60) Australian

Cycling career
- Sport: Cycling

Donna Maree Gould (born 10 June 1966) is an Australian former athlete and cyclist. She competed in the women's 3000 metres at the 1984 Summer Olympics and the women's individual road race at the 1988 Summer Olympics.

Gould is from McLaren Vale, SA, where she trained by running with her father past vineyards in preparation for the Los Angeles Olympics. In 1991 she was ranked in the top 10 women triathletes in Australia.
