= Barnwood Park School =

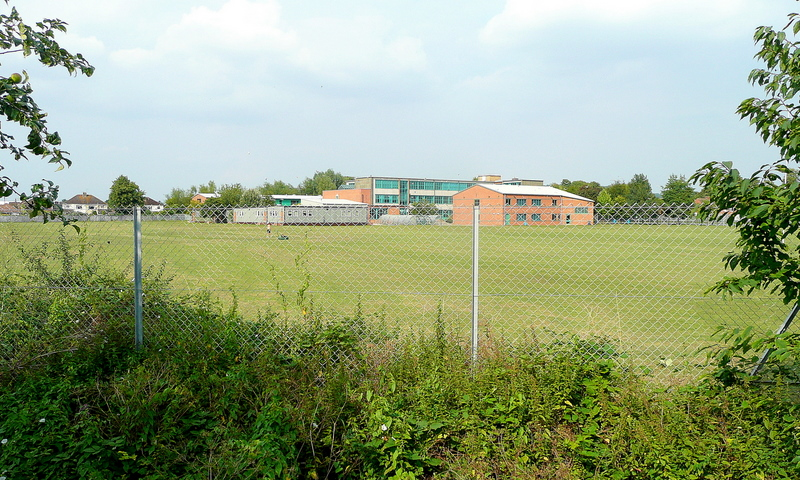
- Barnwood Park School

Location
- St Lawrence Road; Barnwood; Gloucester, Gloucestershire, GL4 3QU; England
- 51.8570°N 2.2094°W

Information
- Type: Academy
- Local authority: Gloucestershire
- Department for Education URN: 115720 Tables
- Ofsted: Reports
- Headteacher: M Preston
- Gender: Coeducational
- Age: 11 to 16
- Enrolment: 915 as of January 2025
- Houses: Parks; Attenborough; Jenner
- Website: www.barnwoodpark.co.uk

Barnwood Park School is a coeducational secondary school located in the Barnwood area of Gloucester in the English county of Gloucestershire.

It was originally known as Barnwood Park High School for Girls, but was then awarded specialist status as an Arts College the school was renamed Barnwood Park Arts College. The school achieved the Artsmark Gold from the Arts Council of England in 2009. From September 2018 the school became coeducational and was renamed Barnwood Park School. Today it is an academy and part of Greenshaw Learning Trust.

Barnwood Park School offers GCSEs and BTECs as programmes of study for pupils.

Research for her 2006 novel Wicked! led author Jilly Cooper to teach several English classes at the school.
