= Polo (novel) =

1991 novel by Jilly Cooper

- Author: Jilly Cooper
- Audio read by: Sherry Baines; Georgia Tennant
- Genre: Bonkbuster; romance
- Set in: 20th-century Rutshire
- Publisher: Transworld
- Publication date: 1991
- Publication place: United Kingdom
- Pages: 766
- Preceded by: Rivals
- Followed by: The Man Who Made Husbands Jealous

Polo is a novel written by the English author Jilly Cooper. Published in 1991, it is the third book in Cooper's Rutshire Chronicles series, preceded by Rivals, and followed by The Man Who Made Husbands Jealous. The novel is 766 pages long and follows the recovery and revenge of polo player Ricky France-Lynch. The bonkbuster was described as a "frothy brew of sex, class and jodhpurs" by the Scunthorpe Star. Journalist Kate Saunders stated that "within its genre it is a work of towering genius".

== Plot ==
Polo follows the lives of characters in the fictional county of Rutshire, centred on the life of polo player Ricky France-Lynch. He kills his son in a car accident, which also injured him. Jailed, France-Lynch becomes friends with a rockstar, Dancer Maitland, and they join forces once released from prison for Maitland to sponsor France-Lynch and a polo team. In parallel, France-Lynch's former wife, Chessie France-Lynch, married his enemy Bart Alderton and moved to America. Alderton, like France-Lynch, is obsessed with polo, and their enmity continues as they meet in matches around the world.

Meanwhile, one of the cottages on France-Lynch's estate is rented to Daisy MacLeod and her daughter Perdita. MacLeod's husband has recently divorced her, and she is struggling to keep her independence. Perdita, who is Daisy's illegitimate daughter, does not know who her father is; she is very difficult, but loves horses and polo. Perdita has a crush on France-Lynch and ends up working in his polo yard, and playing on his and Dancer's team. Polo takes her to Argentina, and to the United States, where she gets together with Alderton's son, Red; despite this, his other son, Luke, falls in love with Perdita.

The novel takes place across continents, and its highest drama is at the polo matches, where the Alderton and France-Lynch teams vie to beat each other. The finale of the novel takes in California, with France-Lynch triumphant. He marries Daisy MacLeod at the end of the novel, after it is revealed that Perdita's long-lost father is Rupert Campbell-Black.

== Background ==
Published in 1991, Polo is the third book in Cooper's Rutshire Chronicles series. Cooper began writing the book in April 1989. She researched the book by travelling to Palm Beach and to Argentina, meeting polo players there. Early potential titles for the book were Rampant, Cooper's suggestion, or Winners, an option her publishers considered more dignified. The novel is 766 pages long.

== Style ==
Cooper's novels are often referred to as "bonkbusters", although in 2016 she described how the term ought to be updated to "shagbusters" as "bonk" is an out-of-date term. Scott McCracken described the novel as structured in a similar way to "a traditional romance narrative". Perdita MacLeod's storyline and flawed character make her central to the book, and there is a strong theme around her lack of paternal care.

== Reception ==
The novel went to number 1 in the UK hardback bestseller list, on its first entry. It was also number 1 in the paperback bestseller list in May 1992. The film rights to the book were sold before it was published in paperback. They were purchased by Anglia TV.

After publication, according to The Scotsman, some readers complained that, in comparison to Riders, Polo did not have enough sex and the characters "spent too much time in the horse box". This was repeated in a 2012 review in The Guardian. The Scunthorpe Star described it as a "frothy brew of sex, class and jodhpurs". Jennifer Bullen has also suggested that Polo was the first place where the term "wag" was published. In 1997 the Dundee Evening News described how Cooper's novel "brought the posh sport to the attention of millions". Writing in the Evening Standard, Kate Saunders described the novel as "all right, it won't make the Booker shortlist. But within its genre it is a work of towering genius".

== Legacy ==
According to the Aberdeen Evening Post, one result of the success of the novel for the sport was an increase in people attending polo matches. There is also a cliché about young women at some British boarding schools sharing copies of the novel to learn about sex.

Former British prime minister Rishi Sunak claimed in May 2023 that Polo, along with other Cooper novels, were his favourite books.

== Adaptations ==
The book was due to be adapted as a TV mini series by Anglia in 1993.

The audiobook was narrated by Sherry Baines and released in 2018. In 2025, Georgia Tennant recorded a second version.

== Analysis ==
Polo has been the subject of a study by academic Gail Cunningham on how horses are used as a driving force in Cooper's work. Cunningham drew parallels between Perdita Macleod's storyline and her final denouement, which could have "come straight from the pages of a twelve-year-old’s pony romance".
