= Frederick S. Waller =

British architect and antiquarian

Frederick Sandham Waller
- Born: 1822
- Died: 22 March 1905 (aged 82–83); Westgrove Barnwood, Gloucs.
- Occupation: Architect
- Practice: Gloucester

Frederick Sandham Waller (1822 – 22 March 1905) was a British architect and antiquarian of Gloucester, where he was the resident architect to the Dean and Chapter of Gloucester Cathedral.

== Career and family ==
Waller was articled to the civil engineer and county surveyor for Gloucestershire, Thomas Fulljames (1808–74), who proposed him as a Fellow of the Royal Institute of British Architects in 1856. Waller worked in partnership with Fulljames from 1846–70 and with Walter Bryan Wood from 1852. One of Waller's sons, Frederick William Waller (1848–1933), was articled to his father and was in partnership with him from 1873.

Another of Waller's sons, Samuel Edward Waller, became an artist. Waller's grandson Noel Huxley Waller (1881–1961) also became an architect.

Waller and his wife Annie lived for several years at the Moors, Barnwood Road. He retired in 1900 and died at Westgrove, Barnwood, Gloucestershire, on 22 March 1905. He was buried at St Bartholomew and St Andrew, Churchdown, on 25 March.

== Architecture ==
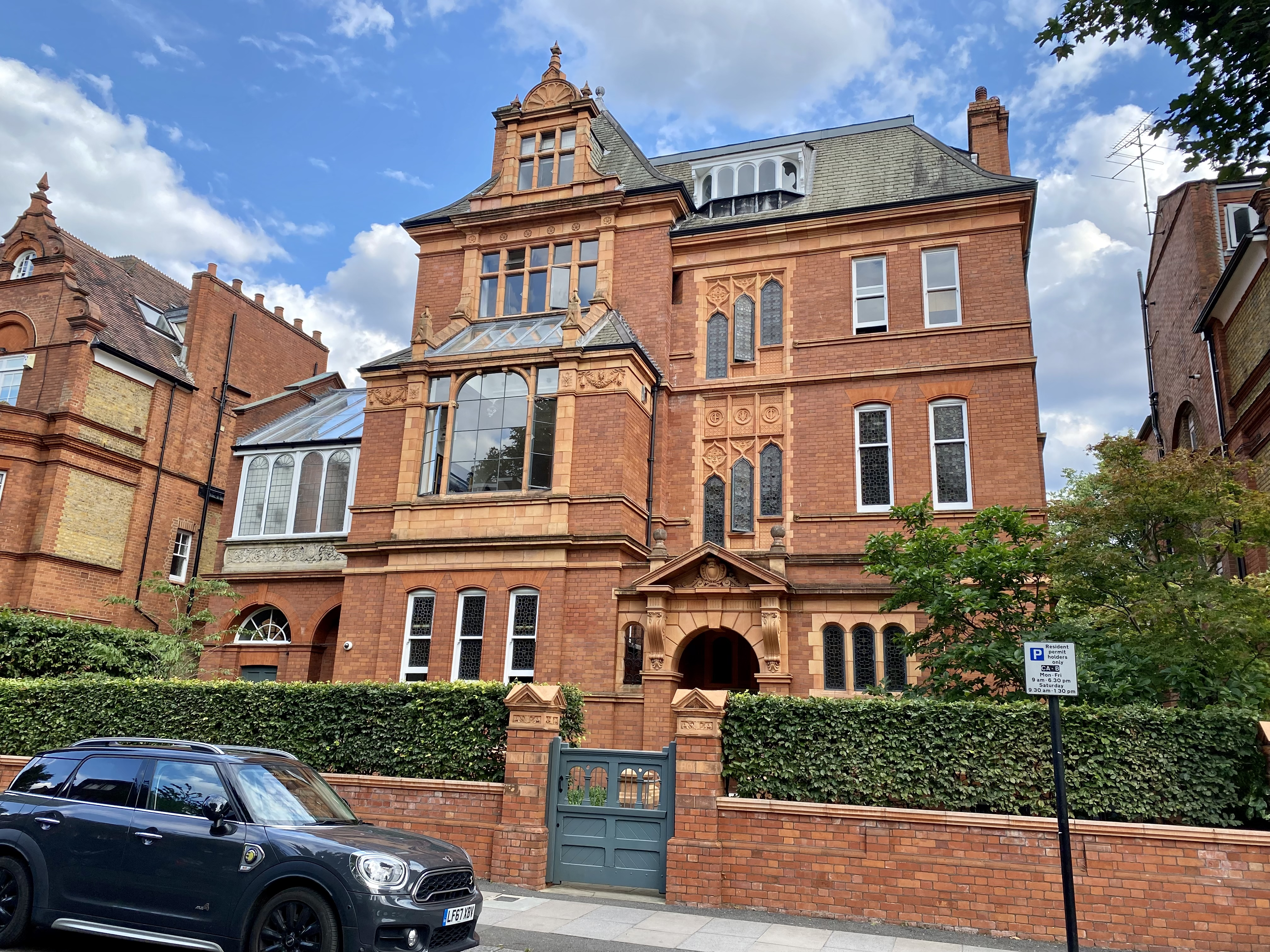
69 Eton Avenue in Belsize Park

Most of Waller's architectural commissions were in Gloucestershire. He also designed a Tudor Revival extension that was added to the house at Great Tew Park in Oxfordshire, and the Derby School of Art. In London's Belsize Park he designed the house at 69 Eton Avenue for the artist John Collier.

== Antiquarianism ==
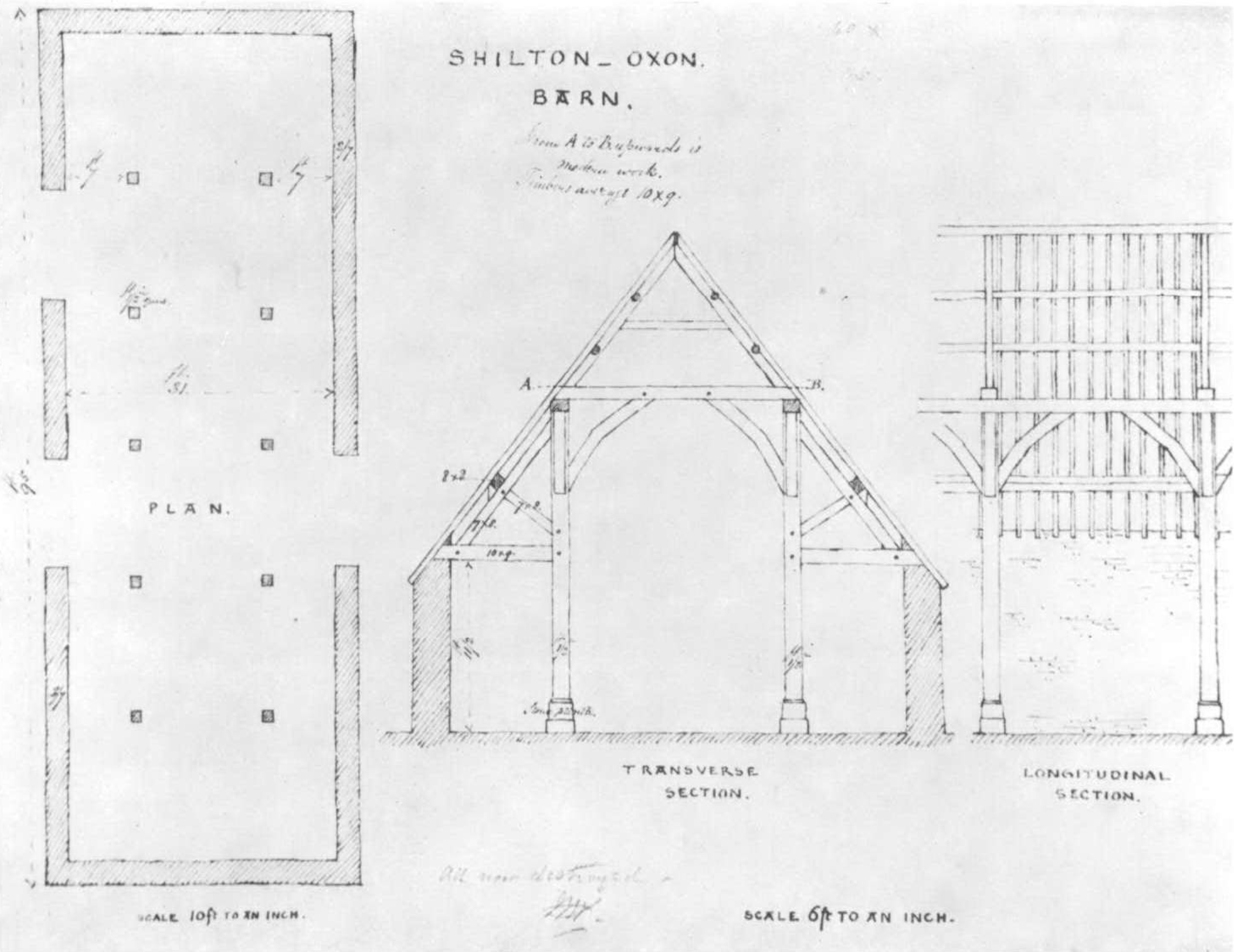
Plan, transverse section and incomplete longitudinal section of a barn at Shilton, Oxfordshire drawn by Waller in about 1848

Waller applied his architectural training to antiquarianism. In 1848 he drew a plan and sections of an historic barn at Shilton, Oxfordshire, that had stone walls and an aisled timber frame. Later the barn was reputedly gutted by fire and at the foot of his drawings Waller added "All now destroyed". However, in 1971 the probable remains of the barn at Shilton were identified with the help of Waller's drawings.

== Sources and further reading ==
- Brodie, Antonia; Felstead, Alison; Franklin, Jonathan; Pinfield, Leslie; Oldfield, Jane, eds. (2001). Directory of British Architects 1834–1914, L–Z. London & New York: Continuum. p. 902. ISBN 082645514X.
- Heyworth, P.L. (1971). "A Lost Cistercian Barn at Shilton, Oxon". Oxoniensia. XXXVI. Oxford: Oxford Architectural and Historical Society: 52–54. ISSN 0308-5562.
- Sherwood, Jennifer; Pevsner, Nikolaus (1974). Oxfordshire. The Buildings of England. Harmondsworth: Penguin Books. ISBN 0-14-071045-0.
- Verey, David (1970). Gloucestershire: The Cotswolds. The Buildings of England. Vol. 1. Harmondsworth: Penguin Books. ISBN 0-14-071040-X.
- Verey, David (1970). Gloucestershire: The Vale and the Forest of Dean. The Buildings of England. Vol. 2. Harmondsworth: Penguin Books.
