= Riders (novel) =

1985 novel by Jilly Cooper

- First edition
- Author: Jilly Cooper
- Language: English
- Genre: Romance novel
- Publisher: Arlington Books Ltd.
- Publication date: 1985
- Publication place: United Kingdom
- Media type: Hardback, Paperback and Audiobook
- ISBN: 0-552-15055-X
- OCLC: 51914056
- Followed by: Rivals

Riders is a 1985 novel written by the English author Jilly Cooper. It is the first of a series of bonkbusters known as the Rutshire Chronicles, which are set in the fictional English county of Rutshire. The story focuses on the lives of a group of top show jumping stars and follows the ups and downs of both their personal and professional lives. The plot focuses on the lives of rival equestrians Rupert Campbell-Black and Jake Lovell, who first met at boarding school and subsequently compete against each other in the show-jumping ring. Their wives also feature heavily in the book: Lovell marries a wealthy debutante, Tory Maxwell, for her money; Campbell-Black marries an American book editor, Helen Macaulay. Both are unfaithful to their wives, with Lovell having an affair with Macaulay. The book's climax is set at the Los Angeles Olympics, where the British team win a gold medal, despite riding one man down and one man injured.

Cooper lost her first draft of the novel circa 1970, after she accidentally left it on a bus in London. She later commented that she felt the book was better as a result, since the characters had much longer to mature. The book was reviewed positively upon publication with writer Anne de Courcy describing the work as progression in terms of Cooper's fiction writing, shifting gear from her previous romantic novels such as Bella.

The novel sold over 1 million copies and was cited by former prime minister Rishi Sunak as one of his favourite books. After Cooper's death in 2025, her publisher Ian Scott-Kerr described how Riders had "changed the course of popular fiction forever".

The novel was adapted in 1993 into a television film for Anglia Television and broadcast on the ITV Network. Riders was directed by Gabrielle Beaumont and starred Marcus Gilbert. The book has influenced writers such as Samantha Ellis, who featured in her book on heroines, and has also influenced British fashion in the 2000s. A revised cover for the 30th-anniversary edition was deemed controversial as it moved the man's hand away from the crotch towards the hip of the featured bottom. Several analyses were given in the press for why this may have been done, including a suggestion that the cover change was related to "heightened sensitivity" to various sexual abuse scandals in the United Kingdom.

The novel is a foundation text of the bonkbuster genre and sits alongside Lace by Shirley Conran, Hollywood Wives by Jackie Collins and Scruples by Judith Krantz as such. Analysis has most often focussed on depictions of sex in the novel, citing themes of coercion, frigidity and humour. Other research has centred the novel's place in the pony book genre, albeit with an intended adult audience.

== Synopsis ==
Set against the backdrop of the English Cotswolds countryside, Riders follows the fortunes of a group of show jumping stars. The novel centres on a rivalry between two men, Jake Lovell and Rupert Campbell-Black, who were at school together and subsequently compete against each other in the 1970s. Their animosity stemmed from Campbell-Black bullying Lovell at boarding school, which was motivated by anti-gypsy sentiment. Whilst Campbell-Black was rich with an inherited fortune, Lovell was poor and his mother died by suicide when he was young. In order to have enough money to set up his own show-jumping yard, Lovell married a debutante named Tory Maxwell to whom he was not always faithful.

Campbell-Black was a renowned womaniser, who had many lovers, before, during, and after his marriage to an American woman called Helen Macaulay. They met when Macaulay was acting as a hunt saboteur. Nevertheless, they married after a short courtship, but Campbell-Black was never faithful to her, having multiple affairs and at least one illegitimate child.

Family life aside, the drama is in the show jumping ring as Lovell and Campbell-Black compete against each at competitions across Europe. Their animosity grows, and they both take over one another's horses in a range of circumstances. Lovell, for example, rescues a horse called Macaulay from quarries in the Middle East where Campbell-Black had sold him, after beating the horse too hard. In return, Campbell-Black buys a horse called Rockstar that was being trained by Lovell, but owned by his parents-in-law, who sold him on.

Wider sub-plots involved Campbell-Black's best friend Billy Lloyd-Foxe, who is married to a journalist called Janey. When the two separate he starts a relationship with Tory's younger sister Fenella Maxwell, who Jake trained in show jumping.

The novel culminates at the Los Angeles Olympics, where Lovell elopes with Helen, Campbell-Black's wife after they have an affair. Campbell-Black dislocates his shoulder, so has to ride one-handed, along with Fenella and one other rider; the whole team a man down due to Lovell's departure. They win gold.

== Background ==
As a child Cooper spent a significant amount of time around horses, and even at that time had wanted to write a novel that featured them. Cooper recalled how she lost her first draft of the novel circa 1970, after she accidentally left it on a bus in London. The draft was never found, despite a public appeal. Cooper spent much of the 1970s trying to re-write the novel, but living in London was not conducive to describing the country life she wanted to portray. In 1982 she moved into a former monastery in Gloucestershire and there got inspiration to finish the novel that became Riders, which was published in 1985.

== Cover ==
When first published in 1985, the book's cover somewhat controversially depicted "a man's hand resting intimately on the seat of a woman's jodhpurs". Bonkbusters commonly have "scandalous covers", but the 30th-anniversary edition moved the male hand from where it was firmly gripping the female rider's bottom to a much higher position nearer to her hip, amidst fan backlash.

Author Marian Keyes supported the change in cover design, citing that the new version showed that women were no longer' men's property. However, many responses felt that this missed the point, with commentators noting that a sexy cover would match the book featuring sex heavily. Critics of the cover change included Rosie Millard, Victoria Hislop, Deborah Moggach, and Germaine Greer. In contrast journalist Zoe Williams described how the revised cover was suggestive of Fifty Shades of Grey and that the revised cover was suggestive of spanking. Editor Roger Tagholm suggested the cover change was more to do with "heightened sensitivity" to sexual abuse scandals in the United Kingdom.

== Reception ==
Upon publication writer Anne de Courcy compared it to Shirley Conran's novel Lace "only with a handful of dock leaves playing the coveted role of goldfish". In the same Evening Standard review she described the work as progression in terms of Cooper's fiction writing, shifting gear from her previous romantic novels such as Bella. De Courcy also praised the novel for its detailed descriptions of equestrian life. On paperback publication in 1986, The Daily Telegraph described how the novel had "a plot by Horse and Hound out of Mills and Boon, with plenty of explicit sex thrown in".

Reviewing the novel on its 30th anniversary, the Belfast Telegraph noted that the sex scenes were less detailed than expected from the book's reputation and that Cooper appeared to have a "disdain for feminism". However, the review's verdict was that the novel was an "undeniably jolly read" with a central feature being aristocrats "being horrible to each other". In the same year The Telegraph reviewed the book suggesting that it may especially appeal to women who grew up reading pony-focussed books by writers such as Christine, Diana and Josephine Pullein-Thompson, or K. M. Peyton. In the latter review by Rowan Pelling it was suggested that journalist Janey Lloyd-Foxe might have been based on Cooper herself, or even Queen Camilla.

== Legacy ==
The novel sold over 1 million copies. On 5 November 2019 BBC News included Riders on its list of the 100 most inspiring novels. Former British Prime Minister Rishi Sunak claimed in May 2023 that Riders was one of his favourite books. In 2025 it was listed as one of Cooper's six sexiest books by the Evening Standard. After Cooper's death in 2025, her publisher Ian Scott-Kerr described how Riders had "changed the course of popular fiction forever".

== Popular culture ==
Writer Daisy Buchanan has described how Janey Lloyd-Foxe is a fictional character that she feels she most resembles. Playwright Samantha Ellis featured Riders in her memoir How to be a Heroine, where she discussed first reading it as a teenager, albeit later than the rest of her friends, and how "discovering Jilly Cooper is like joining a cult". Sophia Money-Coutts has proposed that there is truth in a cliché about young women at British boarding schools sharing copies of the novel to learn about sex. The book appears in the novel Eton Rogue.

Riders has also been cited as having influence on celebrity fashion, for example in the early 2000s when figures such as Elizabeth Hurley and Katie Price looked to recreate the "Jilly Cooper Riders look".

Rowan Pelling, former editor of The Erotic Review, suggested that Cooper invented the term "snail trail" to describe sperm trickling down a thigh after sexual intercourse.

== Adaptation ==
The book was adapted into a television film in 1993, with a script by Charlotte Bingham and Terence Brady. Riders was directed by Gabrielle Beaumont for Anglia Television and broadcast on the ITV Network. John Lyttle, writing for The Independent, described it as a "peculiarly joyless romp".

== Analysis ==
Cooper had unfavourably compared her 2010 novel Jump! to Riders and other early works. She had also described Riders as one of her best books because she had an extended period of writing, due to the loss of the first draft, which enabled the characters to develop more fully.

Cooper's works, especially Riders, is often described alongside Lace by Shirley Conran, Hollywood Wives by Jackie Collins and Scruples by Judith Krantz as the founding texts of the bonkbuster genre. In Britain, Cooper is seen to exemplify the genre. Riders' characterisation has been described as differing from other canonical bonkbusters, due to its plot's focus on the male characters of Lovell and Campbell-Black. Another characteristic of the genre is a dose of reality in some sex scenes, and Riders' is cited for that: from Fenella's boyfriend Enrico's chest hair to Helen Macaulay's faked orgasms and the anxiety that sex with her husband induces. The latter is contrasted to during her affair with Jake Lovell, who 'cures' her supposed frigidity. Indeed, a section that features a group sex scene between the Campbell-Blacks and the Lloyd-Foxes highlights how Helen was forced into non-consensual sex, largely, but not exclusively, by her husband.

Academic Tom Miles has also noted that humour in Cooper's writing celebrates sex. In another study, academic Scott McCracken has drawn parallels between Riders and the concept of licensed carnival. Another study by Gail Cunningham examined the relationship between horses and romance in Cooper's works, citing Riders as a book where "raunchy promiscuity" and a "comic style ... dependent on Christmas cracker-like puns" meet a "world centred on horses" to brilliant effect. Samantha Ellis, writing on heroines, discusses women in Riders: describing the only feminist in the book as a walking cliche; Janey Lloyd-Foxe as "too bitchy and brainless to like"; Helen Macauley having an character arch that transforms her to a neurotic; Fenella Maxwell as not always kind enough to be a role model; Tory Lovell begins as a more relatable character "eating cornflakes in bed with double cream", but whose storyline becomes tragic as her marriage continues, ending with a suicide attempt.
