= A Ghost in Monte Carlo =

1951 novel by Barbara Cartland

- Author: Barbara Cartland
- Language: English
- Genre: Romantic novel
- Publisher: Rich & Cowan
- Publication date: 1 January 1951
- Publication place: United Kingdom
- Media type: Print (Paperback & Hardback)
- Pages: 256 pp

A Ghost in Monte Carlo is a 1951 novel by Barbara Cartland.

== Film ==
The book was adapted for made-for-television film in 1990 starring Lysette Anthony, Marcus Gilbert, Sarah Miles and Oliver Reed.

== Synopsis ==
Eighteen-year-old Mistral arrives in Monte Carlo on the Côte D'Azur, accompanied by her aunt Emilie and a servant, Jeanne. Dressed entirely in grey, Mistral draws attention in the salons and ballrooms and her identity becomes a subject of speculation in Monte Carlo society. Several men are attracted to her, including a man named Sir Robert Stanford. But her aunt permits her to speak only with the Russian Prince Nikolai. Even though Mistral finds herself attracted to Sir Robert, she obeys her aunt. Emilie's restrictions, however, stem from her own motives rather than a concern for her niece.
