= Shilton, Oxfordshire =

Village in Oxfordshire, England

Coordinates: 51°46′29″N 01°36′52″W

Shilton
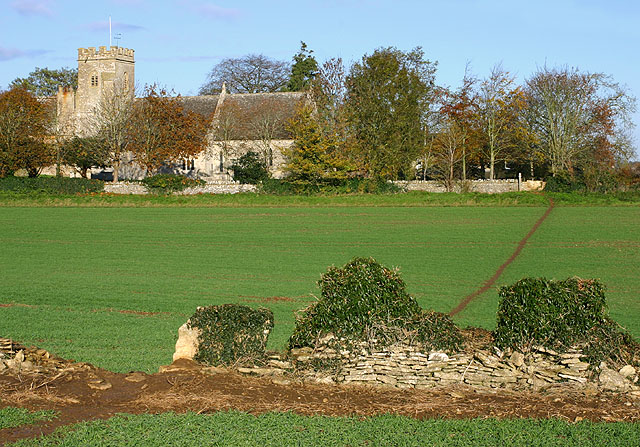
- Holy Rood parish church, seen from the south

- Location within Oxfordshire
- Population: 626 (2011 Census)
- OS grid reference: SP2608
- Civil parish: Shilton
- District: West Oxfordshire
- Shire county: Oxfordshire
- Region: South East
- Country: England
- Sovereign state: United Kingdom
- Post town: Burford
- Postcode district: OX18
- Dialling code: 01993
- Police: Thames Valley
- Fire: Oxfordshire
- Ambulance: South Central
- UK Parliament: Witney
- Website: Shilton Village Noticeboard

Shilton is a village and civil parish about 1 1/2 miles (2.4 km) northwest of Carterton, Oxfordshire. The 2011 Census recorded the parish's population as 626.

== Geography ==
Shilton village is on Shill Brook: a stream that rises southwest of Burford, flows through Shilton and Alvescot to Black Bourton, where it becomes Black Bourton Brook, which joins the River Thames downstream from Radcot. Shilton was historically part of the manor of Great Faringdon, and most of Shilton parish was an exclave of Berkshire until the Counties (Detached Parts) Act 1844 transferred it to Oxfordshire.

== Manor ==
When the Cistercian Beaulieu Abbey in Hampshire was founded in 1203–04, it was endowed with a group of manors that were headed by Great Faringdon and included Shilton. Beaulieu retained the manors until 1538, when it surrendered all its properties to the Crown in the Dissolution of the Monasteries. In about 1848 the architect and antiquarian Frederick S. Waller drew a plan and sections of an aisled barn at Shilton. It had six bays and an internal timber frame built on two rows of five large timber posts, This seems likely to have been a medieval barn, built when Beaulieu Abbey held Shilton Manor. Beaulieu Abbey also held the manor at Great Coxwell, 9 miles (14 km) south of Shilton. Great Coxwell Barn, which was built for the Abbey around 1292, survives intact and is open to the public. It is somewhat larger and structurally more complex than the barn that Waller found at Shilton, but it gives an idea of the scale, style and quality of building that the Cistercians commissioned.

Tradition had it that a fire destroyed the barn at Shilton. However, in 1971 an historian, PL Heyworth, reported that the stone walls of the barn and a few of its timbers still survived. Heyworth found a farm in the village had a stone-walled barn that had a modern arched corrugated steel roof, but had some stone corbels that would formerly have carried principal rafters of a former gabled roof. Heyworth found that the lintels of two large doorways in the barn were re-used timbers that had been principal posts. Each had the mortices that would have held a tie beam and a strut, both of which would have been parts of a timber roof. The barn is near a house called the Old Manor, a medieval dovecote, a possible former medieval fishpond and a field called Conyger (i.e. it had been a place for rearing "coneys" – rabbits). Heyworth therefore concluded that the barn is very likely to be the remains of a Cistercian barn. The dovecote is cylindrical and has a conical roof. It is early 16th century and is a Grade II* listed building.

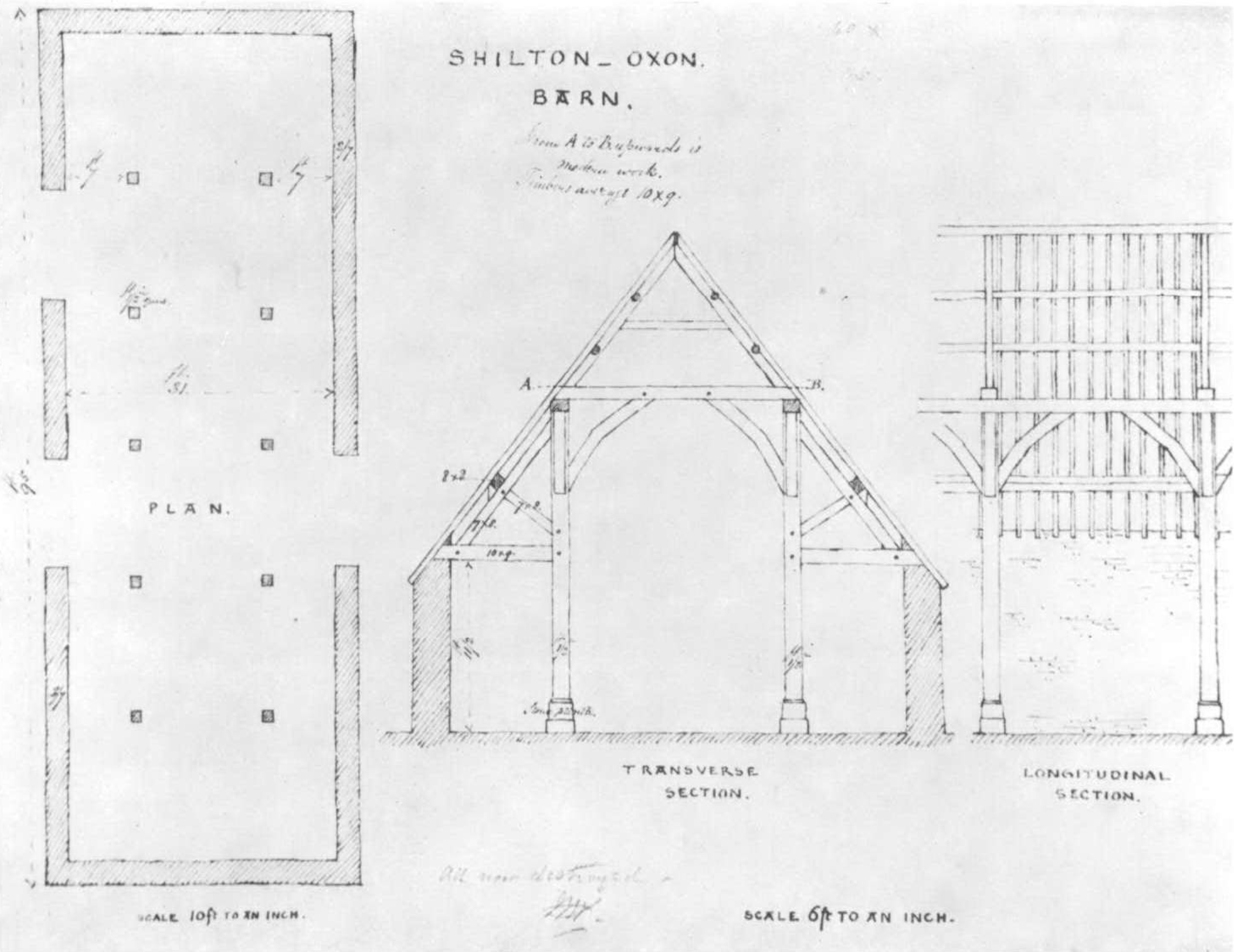
Plan, transverse section and incomplete longitudinal section of a barn at Shilton, drawn by FS Waller in about 1848 and discussed by PL Heyworth in 1971

== Church and chapel ==
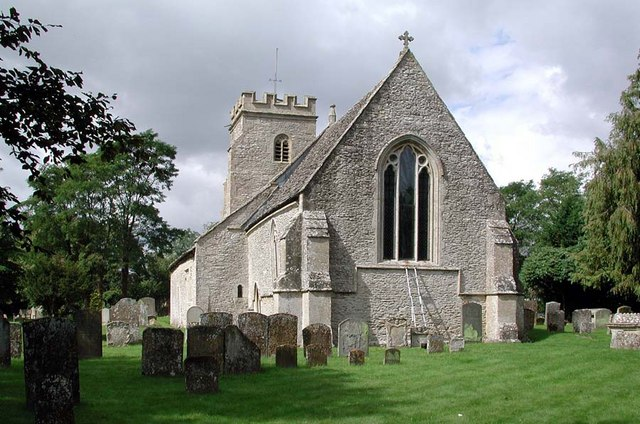
Holy Rood parish church

=== Church of England ===
The earliest parts of the Church of England parish church of the Holy Rood are the Norman nave, south aisle and arcade, all of which were built in about 1150. The present Early English Gothic chancel was built in about 1250. The bell tower was added in the 15th century. The present side windows of the nave and aisle are also late Medieval Perpendicular Gothic additions. The Gothic Revival architect C.C. Rolfe restored the building in 1884–88, adding the present rood screen. The church is a Grade II* listed building. Holy Rood church tower has three bells, all cast in 1854 by W. & J. Taylor of Loughborough, who at the time also had a bell-foundry in Oxford. Currently for technical reasons they are unringable. Holy Rood also has a Sanctus bell that Henry III Bagley cast in 1730. Bagley was from Chacombe, Northamptonshire but also had a foundry at Witney. Holy Rood parish is now part of the Benefice of Shill Valley and Broadshire.

=== Baptist ===
Shilton has a Baptist chapel that was built in the early or mid 19th century. It may have been converted from a small barn.

== Economic history ==
Traditional houses and cottages in Shilton are built of local Cotswold stone. Shilton House was built in 1678 and is a Grade II* listed building. Elm Farm dates from 1683. Shilton Bridge across Shill Brook is a small stone hump-back bridge that was probably built in the 18th century. By the 1930s its stonework had become decayed, it was too narrow for modern traffic and its hump was too acute for some vehicles. In 1938 Oxfordshire County Council rebuilt the bridge, making the road across it wider and reducing the hump. The sides of the bridge were rebuilt using the original stones in their original relative positions as far as possible, while the widening of the bridge was achieved by inserting a concrete section in the middle of the road hidden from view.

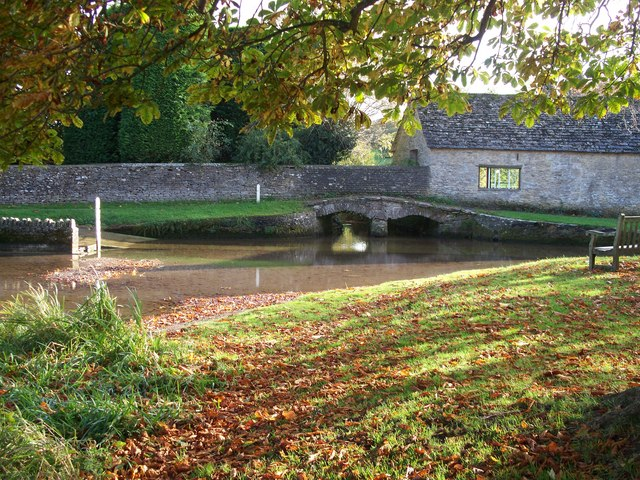
The ford and footbridge across Shill Brook

== Amenities ==
Shilton has a 17th-century public house, the Rose and Crown.

== Notable residents ==
John Coghlan, drummer of the rock band Status Quo, lives in Shilton.

== Sources ==
- Ditchfield, PH; Page, WH, eds. (1907). "House of Cistercian monks: The cell or grange of Faringdon". A History of the County of Berkshire. Victoria County History. Vol. II. London: Archibald Constable & Co. pp. 81–82.
- Heyworth, PL (1971). "A Lost Cistercian Barn at Shilton, Oxon" (PDF). Oxoniensia. XXXVI. Oxford: Oxford Architectural and Historical Society: 52–54. ISSN 0308-5562.
- Leeming, JJ (1940). "Shilton Bridge" (PDF). Oxoniensia. V. Oxford: Oxford Architectural and Historical Society: 170.
- Sherwood, Jennifer; Pevsner, Nikolaus (1974). Oxfordshire. The Buildings of England. Harmondsworth: Penguin Books. pp. 754–755. ISBN 0-14-071045-0.
