= Barnwood =

Suburb of Gloucester, England

Coordinates: 51.864°N 2.202°W

- Suburb
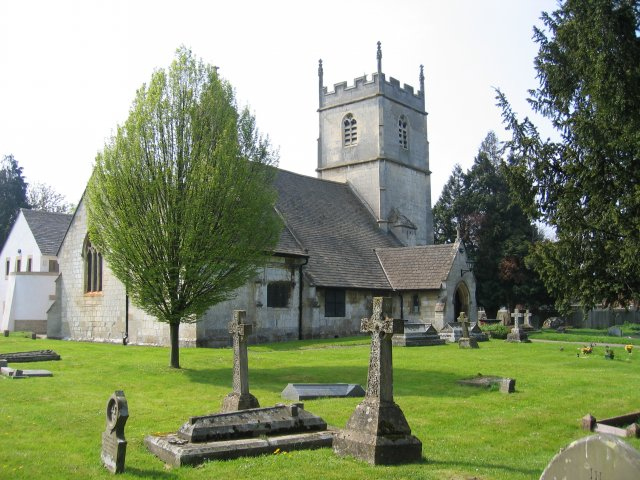

- Location within Gloucestershire
- Population: 10,317 (ward, 2011)
- OS grid reference: SO8618
- District: Gloucester
- Shire county: Gloucestershire
- Region: South West
- Country: England
- Sovereign state: United Kingdom
- Post town: Gloucester
- Postcode district: GL4
- Dialling code: 01452
- Police: Gloucestershire
- Fire: Gloucestershire
- Ambulance: South Western
- UK Parliament: Gloucester

Barnwood is a suburb and former civil parish in the city of Gloucester, in the county of Gloucestershire, England. It lies about 1.8 miles (2.9 km) east of the centre of the city.

Barnwood was originally a small village on the Roman road that links Gloucester with Hucclecote, Brockworth and Cirencester. The Church of England parish church is dedicated to St Lawrence.

== Economy ==
The Generation Design and Construction Division of the CEGB became the centre of a new office development when it moved here in the early 1970s. This then became the corporate headquarters of Nuclear Electric, and later the English offices of the (nominally Scottish-based) British Energy, which in 2009 became part of EDF Energy. Other major companies in Barnwood include Claranet, Cheltenham & Gloucester, Unilever Gloucester (ice cream) and InterCall. There is also a Holiday Inn, Sainsbury's, Virgin Active and Tenpin Ltd in the area.

== Education ==
Barnwood Park School is a secondary school.

== Arboretum ==
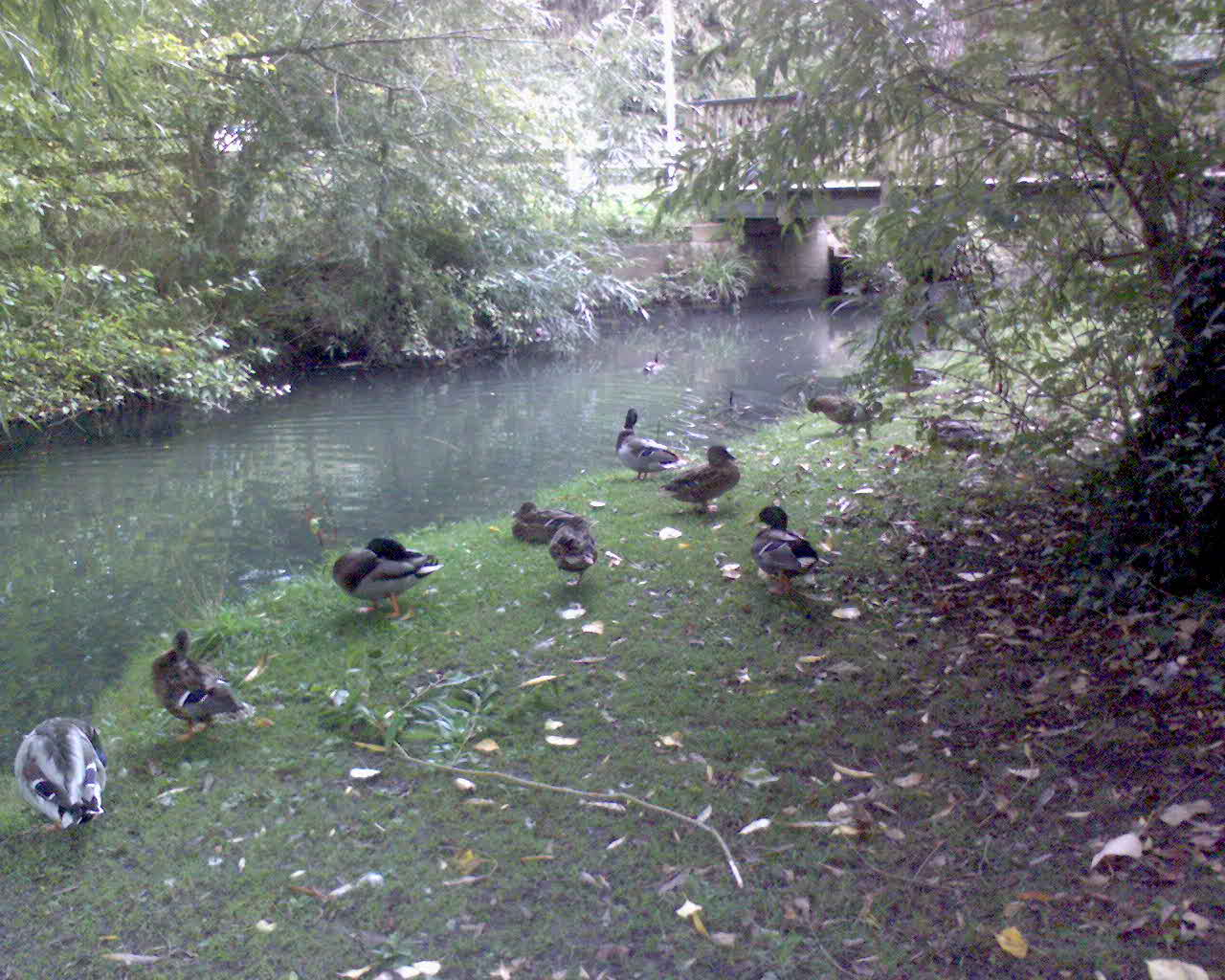
Wotton Brook, which flows past Barnwood Arboretum

Barnwood Arboretum is set on the grounds of the Barnwood House Hospital which was closed in 1968 and finally demolished in 2000. The arboretum consists of an enclosed woodland area that is cared for and conserved by Gloucester City Council in conjunction with the Friends of Barnwood Arboretum (FOBA). The Arboretum's main entrance is off Church Lane, Barnwood. It has with various habitats including grassland and wetland, and is set amongst a collection of mature native and exotic specimen trees.

The Friends of Barnwood Arboretum & Park organise events throughout the year to encourage local citizens to use the area in an educational manner.

== Football ==
Barnwood United Association Football Club was displaced from Barnwood and its Walls Club home in March 2024 when the venue's operator went into liquidation. The Walls Club has remained closed since, with little public information available regarding its future.

Nicknamed "The Barny Army", the club has flourished under the leadership of several former players, securing a 25-year lease at the nearby Coopers Edge Sports Hub through a competitive tender process. The club maintains its presence in Barnwood, socialising at Wotton Hall Social Club after training and matches.

In April 2021, there had been serious discussions about reducing to a single team; however, by the 2025–26 season, Barnwood United had expanded to 19 teams wearing their familiar claret and blue colours.

The club currently fields:

- Three men's teams, competing in the Gloucestershire Northern Senior League Division 2, Stroud and District Football League Divisions 3 and 5.
- A women's team
- A veterans' team
- Three pan disability teams
- Eight mixed youth teams
- Two girls' teams
- A Comets programme offering recreational football for children with disabilities

The club is affiliated to Gloucestershire FA.

== Notable people ==
Samuel and Anne Bubb, who were grandparents of the inventor Sir Charles Wheatstone (1802–75), lived at Barnwood Manor House. Biographical notes of 1887 say that Sir Charles stated that he was born in the house and lived there as a young child, and this was the scene of some of his earliest experiments. In later years Wheatstone often returned to Barnwood. A local public house is named The Wheatstone Inn after him.

The architect Frederick S. Waller (1822–1905), sometime resident architect at Gloucester Cathedral, lived and died at Barnwood.

== Civil parish ==
On 1 April 1966 the parish was abolished and became part of Gloucester, Hucclecote and Upton St Leonards. In 1961 the parish had a population of 2160.

== See also ==
- Barnwood House Hospital
- Coney Hill Hospital
