= Michael Davie =

British journalist (1924–2005)

Michael Davie (15 January 1924 – 7 December 2005) was a British journalist.

Born in Cranleigh, Surrey, Davie was the last of three children born to the head of a firm of stockbrokers. He was educated at Haileybury and Merton College, Oxford, where he began reading English, but after war service in the Royal Navy, returned to study History. Before he graduated, Davie was offered a job as diplomatic correspondent by David Astor, editor of The Observer, but the post had been filled by the time he had left Oxford University.

After a brief period at the Manchester Evening News, he joined The Observer in 1950 as religious correspondent. Davie subsequently became the newspaper's news editor, sports writer and editor of the colour supplement when it was first published in 1965. Close to Astor, he was appointed deputy editor of the newspaper, a position he retained until 1969. He then returned to writing, still on The Observer staff, where he edited the 'Notebook' feature. Davie was the editor of the diaries of novelist Evelyn Waugh; the volume appeared in 1976. That year he won the What the Papers Say 'Journalist of the Year' Award.

In 1977, he settled in Melbourne, Australia, where he became Associate Editor of The Age, becoming the newspaper's editor in 1979, a post he retained until returning to London and The Observer in 1981 for the remainder of his career. Davie retired in 1988.

Following his retirement, he wrote a biography of the press baron Lord Beaverbrook with his wife which was published in 1992. His other books include a study of President Lyndon B. Johnson LBJ (1966); In the Future Now (1972), a contemporary account of the social changes and sun-rise industries in California; The Titanic (1986) and (with his son Simon) The Faber Book of Cricket (1987). His final completed book was Anglo-Australian Attitudes published in 2000.

Michael Davie married twice, his wife from 1975 was the writer and journalist Anne Chisholm. With his first wife (Robin Atherton) he had a son and two daughters, and an adopted son (who predeceased him) with his second. His adopted son was Anne's nephew Jesse, who died in a car accident in January 2002 aged 32 and was the father of skeleton racer and Team GB Winter Olympic gold medallist Tabitha Stoecker Davie died in December 2005 in Ewelme, Oxfordshire.

Media offices
Preceded by ?	Deputy Editor of The Observer; 1965–1969	Succeeded by Donald Trelford
