= A Hazard of Hearts =

1987 British television film

- Print advertisement
- Based on: A Hazard of Hearts by Barbara Cartland
- Written by: Terence Feely
- Directed by: John Hough
- Starring: Diana Rigg; Edward Fox; Helena Bonham Carter; Fiona Fullerton; Stewart Granger
- Theme music composer: Laurie Johnson
- Country of origin: United Kingdom
- Original language: English

Production
- Producers: Albert Fennell; John Hough
- Cinematography: Frank Watts
- Editor: Robert C. Dearberg
- Running time: 89 minutes

Original release
- Network: CBS
- Release: 27 December 1987

A Hazard of Hearts is a 1987 made-for-television romantic drama film starring Helena Bonham Carter in one of her first major roles. It is based on a 1949 novel by Barbara Cartland.

== Plot ==
Sir Giles Staverley, a compulsive gambler, is tricked into gambling away his home by his old adversary, Lord Harry Wrotham. As Staverley is distraught and desperate, Wrotham gives him one last chance―he will gamble everything Staverley has lost against Staverley's daughter's hand in marriage and her trust fund of 80,000 guineas. Desperate to recoup his losses, Staverley agrees, despite his nephew Nicholas's desperate attempt to persuade him against it. Staverley loses once again.

Unable to face his daughter, Serena, Staverley shoots himself. Lord Justin Vulcan, a notoriously cool, clear-headed gambler, challenges Wrotham for the house and the girl. Much to Wrotham's disgust, Vulcan wins. Now in possession of the house and Serena, Justin has no idea of what to do with them. Nicholas races to his cousin, Serena, to inform her of the turn of events, begging her to marry him, to shield her from the infamous Lord Vulcan. However, Serena stoically refuses, unwilling to intervene in Nicholas' love for Isabel Gillingham and declaring that the Staverleys have always paid their debts.

Justin is in no hurry to visit the Staverley estate for several days, claiming that his victory had slipped his mind. After meeting Serena and realising that she is much younger and more attractive than he had imagined, Justin installs her as his guest at Mandrake, his ancestral home next to the sea. Lady Harriet Vulcan, who opposes her son’s engagement, runs an illegal gaming house at Mandrake as well as a smuggling operation for brandy, wines, silk, and other luxuries from Paris. Soon Lady Harriet sees a profitable way to rid herself of Serena by marrying her off to a suitor for a hefty broker's fee.

Serena and Justin form an unexpected friendship as Justin shows her around his estate and Justin muses aloud whether he can succeed in making Serena fall in love with him; still unsure, she retreats shyly.

The detestable Lord Harry Wrotham, who Serena blames for her father’s death, is eager to take up Lady Harriet's offer to marry off Serena for her 80,000 guineas dowry. Threatening to disclose her smuggling operation, Wrotham blackmails Lady Harriet into plotting to marry Serena to him for 10,000 guineas.

The smugglers arrive four days early, before Lady Harriet, who gambles much of her profits, can pay the money she owes. When they attempt to take her jeweled necklace as payment, Lady Harriet kills the leader with her cane's hidden sword. Having been sent by Justin to warn his mother that the Coast Guard have also arrived, Serena witnesses the killing and runs to Justin for comfort.

Exploring the house's hidden passages, Serena learns the previous Lord Vulcan, Justin's father, is still alive, furtively living in the tower for some years. Lady Harriet having gambled away his fortune, the previous Lord Vulcan faked his own death to unlock his son's fortune, held in trust until assuming the title. Away on his Grand Tour on learning of his father's "death", Justin could not later expose the fraud without condemning his parents.

Wrotham attempts to abduct Serena without Justin's knowledge. When Wrotham's carriage is held up by Joker, a highwayman, Serena appeals to Joker to assist her escape from Wrotham. In a gallant gesture, Joker takes Serena back to Mandrake on his horse, where she informs Justin of his mother's treachery.

Confronting his mother, Justin says he could overlook the gambling and the smuggling, but now she has gone too far. He intends to banish his mother from the estate. He then challenges Wrotham to a duel in London, where Wrotham wounds Justin as he is intentionally distracted. Serena impulsively rides to London on a horse, unaccompanied by a chaperone, to see that he is not badly injured. Propriety now forces Justin to go through with the marriage. Serena and Justin now admit their feelings for each other.

As Serena prepares for her marriage the next day, Lady Harriet attempts to drug Serena unsuccessfully, then chases Serena with her sword, but is intercepted by Wrotham, who kills Lady Harriet in another attempt to abduct Serena. Justin arrives back in time to kill Wrotham in a sword fight and rescue Serena. They are married, declaring their love for each other.

== Cast ==
- Helena Bonham Carter - Serena Staverley
- Marcus Gilbert - Lord Justin Vulcan
- Edward Fox - Lord Harry Wrotham
- Diana Rigg - Lady Harriet Vulcan, Justin's mother
- Christopher Plummer - Sir Giles Staverley, Serena's father
- Stewart Granger - Old Lord Vulcan, Justin's father
- Fiona Fullerton ... Lady Isabel Gillingham
- Neil Dickson ... Nicholas
- Anna Massey ... Eudora, Serena's Maid
- Eileen Atkins ... Lady Harriet's Maid
- Gareth Hunt ... Joker, a highwayman
- Robert Addie ... Lord Peter Gillingham
- James Gaddas ... Lord John Burley
- Christopher Villiers ... Captain Jackson

== Production ==
The novel was published in 1949. "This was my first costume book," Cartland said, "so I put in everything - highwaymen, jewels, the kitchen stove."

It was intended to be the first in a series of Cartland adaptations by producer Albert Fennell for CBS. He had optioned the novels ten years earlier and tried unsuccessfully to get finance. His option lapsed and producer Ed Friendly made The Flame is Love for NBC, which Cartland did not enjoy ("it was frightfully badly cast"). She was involved in A Hazard of Hearts from the beginning.
