= Mary McCarthy (Irish novelist) =

Irish novelist from Glasnevin in Dublin

Mary McCarthy (1951–2013) was an Irish novelist from Glasnevin in Dublin.

== Works ==
McCarthy was the author of five novels, Remember Me, And No Bird Sang, Crescendo, Shame the Devil and After the Rain with Poolbeg Press. She sold over 100,000 copies of her works and three of her titles have been translated into other languages including French, German and Finnish. Her work has been praised by Time magazine.,

== Background and inspiration ==
McCarthy was part of the growth in contemporary women's Irish fiction which emerged in the 1990s. Other notable authors of this movement include Patricia Scanlan, Maeve Binchy and Cathy Kelly. McCarthy's books were regarded as 'thinking fiction' within the industry, and were a marked departure from the simultaneously flourishing genre of holiday novels, also known as "chick lit".

All of her work received favourable reviews from television programmes and book reviews in the Irish Daily Star, The Irish Times and The Irish Independent newspapers. In Ireland she appeared on TV3 in person as well as in interviews on radio for Today FM and Near FM. She wrote articles for the Irish Independent, Sunday World Magazine, Women's Way, Journal.ie and Bark! magazine.

== Death ==
She died of cancer, aged 62, on 2 May 2013.
