= The Man Who Made Husbands Jealous =

Novel by Jilly Cooper

- Author: Jilly Cooper
- Language: English
- Series: Rutshire Chronicles
- Genre: Romance, bonkbuster
- Set in: 20th-century England
- Published: 1993 (Bantam Books)
- Publisher: Bantam Books
- Publication date: 1993
- Publication place: United Kingdom
- Preceded by: Polo
- Followed by: Appassionata

The Man Who Made Husbands Jealous is a 1993 novel written by Jilly Cooper as part of the Rutshire Chronicles, is about Lysander Hawkley, a man who is employed by wives to make their adulterous husbands jealous, and reinvest in their marriages.The book was first published in hardback in 1993 and then in paperback in April 1994, and was later adapted into a television miniseries. Upon publication of the novel Quentin Oates writing in The Bookseller commented that with this novel Cooper had "joined the great, the good and the reviewable", although many reviews did not appreciate the humour or the sex scenes. However Maeve Binchy described the novel as "a happy feckless romp".

== Plot ==
Lysander Hawkley is a handsome young man without full-time employment. After his father refuses to lend him any money, his friend, Ferdinand, comes up with a scheme to make money out of his womanizing: to help wives make their adulterous husbands jealous. The plan, in theory, is simple: to make bored husbands realise why they had fallen in love with their wives in the first place. Hawkley's first customer is Marigold Lockton, whose record producer husband is having an affair. Hawkley moves to their village - Paradise in Rutshire - and is both a personal trainer for Marigold and subsequently seduces her. In another arrangement, Hawkley is employed by superstar singer Georgie Maguire to try to win back her husband. Maguire's daughter, Flora, however falls for Hawkley. Also living in the village is the famous conductor Roberto Rannaldini, who is both adulterous and terrifies his young wife Kitty. Ultimately Kitty and Hawkley fall in love, and she escapes from Rannaldini by riding one of his race horses.

== Characters ==
- Lysander Hawkley
- Ferdinand Fitzgerald
- Roberto Rannaldini
- Rupert Campbell-Black
- Georgie Maguire
- Kitty Rannaldini
- Flora Seymour

== Reception ==
Published in 1993, the novel had the working title of Toyboy. Upon publication, Quentin Oates, writing in The Bookseller, commented that with this novel Cooper had "joined the great, the good and the reviewable" - drawing attention to multiple reviews from broadsheet and tabloid newspapers. Oates criticised the lack of originality in The Observer's review by Valentine Cunningham. In it Cunningham described how the excess of puns in Cooper's writing failed to disguise the "human shallowness" of the characters. Oates praised Maeve Binchy's review, in contrast to Cunningham's giving the impression that Binchy understood the book better - she described the novel as "a happy feckless romp". Oates also commented on The Telegraph's review, which praised the novel for turning the rules of romantic fiction upside down, and having a heroine who is described repeatedly as "plain". Polly Toynbee, reviewing the novel for The Times, expressed disappointment in it largely due to the fact she knows Cooper to be a clever writer; overall Toynbee was left disappointed by it.

Natasha Walter, writing in The Independent, described the novel as "bland, frothy gunk" that was "addictive". She criticises its portrayal of women, particularly the various ways in which women's appearances are denigrated, either by male chauvinists, or more often by other women. Where Walter praised the novel was in its depictions of adultery, particularly from the point of view of the women who are cheated on. She describes this mood as "heartfelt, self-abasing misery that is immensely painful to read". She was also critical of the sex in the novel, where encounters are soft porn-like and rarely empower women. In contrast Sophia Money-Coutts described how, when she read the novel as a young teenager, she appreciated that it made sex sound like it should be fun. The Hull Daily Mail gave the book a one star review and described the characters as being a "tedious mixture" of stereotypes.

Former British Prime Minister, Rishi Sunak claimed in May 2023 that The Man Who Made Husbands Jealous, along with other Cooper novels were his favourite books. It is also one of writer Emerald Fennell's favourite works. The novel is noted amongst other works for its sub-plot centred on miscarriage.

== Adaptation ==
In 1997, a TV miniseries version was produced for ITV, by Anglia Television. It starred Stephen Billington as Lysander Hawkley, Hugh Bonneville as Ferdinand Fitzgerald, and Rhona Mitra as Flora Seymour. According to the Hull Daily Mail, a song from the series about Lysander ('Lysander's theme') was released into the pop charts.

In 2016 the production company Filmwave acquired the rights to the novel, alongside those of nine other Rutshire Chronicles. The company was behind the 2024 adaptation of Rivals.

== Literary influence ==
The novel features briefly in Two Metres From You by Heidi Stephens. It also features in the satirical novel Why We Were Right by comedian Rosie Holt.
