= Rutshire Chronicles =

Novel series by Jilly Cooper

The Rutshire Chronicles is a series of romantic novels by Jilly Cooper. Set in the fictional county of Rutshire, characters recur across the series, including the upper-class MP Rupert Campbell-Black. The first book in the series was published in 1985, and the last in 2023. Three of the books from the series, Riders, Rivals and The Man Who Made Husbands Jealous, have been adapted for television, in 1993, 2023 and 1997 respectively.

== Background ==
The series is set in the fictional county of Rutshire, in the Cotswolds. The name of the county (Note: 'Rut' is a word used to describe animalistic sexual activity.) links to the sexual content of the books. Cooper wrote over thirty other books in addition to this series. The first book in the series was published in 1985, the most recent Tackle! in 2023. The series follows a cast of wealthy and largely upper-class families, and is known for its sexual plotlines and scandalous scenes. Indeed the Financial Times described the series in 2024 as "legendarily filthy". Cooper was meticulous about her research for of the novels. This included travelling to Palm Beach and Argentina to research Polo.

Cooper acknowledged that the character of Rupert Campbell-Black was inspired by: the 11th Duke of Beaufort; Andrew Parker Bowles, the former husband of Queen Camilla; and the 21st Earl of Suffolk. Each of the books includes a character list prior to the main text. These lists have been described by Tamara Atkin as a "gateway to Cooper's over-sexed landscape of horse-riding toffs" but having the additional function of familiarity for the reader throughout the series.

== Characters ==
- Rupert Campbell-Black
- Agatha 'Taggie' Campbell-Black, née O'Hara
- Marcus Campbell-Black
- Tabitha Campbell-Black
- Basil Baddingham
- Billy Lloyd-Foxe
- Janie Lloyd-Foxe
- Declan O'Hara
- Cameron Cook
- Tony Baddingham
- Ricky France-Lynch
- Chessie France-Lynch (later Chessie Alderton)
- Daisy McLeod
- Perdita McLeod
- Bart Alderton
- Luke Alderton
- Lysander Hawkley
- Flora Seymour
- Roberto Rannaldini
- Hermione Harefield
- Cosmo Rannaldini
- Anthea Belvedon
- Dora Belvedon
- Helen Hawkley, née McCauley (formerly Campbell-Black, Gordon, Rannaldini)
- Etta Bancroft
- Amber Lloyd-Foxe
- Valent Edwards

== Rutshire Chronicles books ==
1. Riders (1986)
2. Rivals (1988; also Players in the USA)
3. Polo (1991)
4. The Man Who Made Husbands Jealous (1993)
5. Appassionata (1996)
6. Score! (1999)
7. Pandora (2002)
8. Wicked! (2006)
9. Jump! (2010)
10. Mount! (2016)
11. Tackle! (2023)

== Adaptations ==
Several books from the series have been adapted for television, the first was Riders which was aired as a miniseries, despite being shot as a television film, in 1993. Polo was due to be adapted as a TV miniseries by Anglia TV in the same year. In 1997, The Man Who Made Husbands Jealous was adapted as a TV miniseries for ITV, by Anglia Television. In 2016 the production company Filmwave acquired the rights to the novel, alongside those of nine other Rutshire Chronicles. The company was behind the 2024 adaptation of Rivals. A second series of Rivals was commissioned in 2025.

== Reception ==
The series has influenced the real world in several ways. For example, Polo the novel brought the sport to a wider audience and attendance at matches increased. Horses feature to a greater or lesser extent in the majority of the series, most notably in Riders, Polo, The Man Who Made Husbands Jealous, Mount! and Jump!; this association has been linked with other novels that focus on desire, including The Nonesuch and Regency Buck.

Cooper's recent works, including Jump! received a variety of responses from critics, with Olivia Laing in The Guardian praising "her near-magical ability to conjure up a world and populate it with people for whom you feel a deep affection". Since the 2010s the series has been criticised for dated and problematic portrayals of race, homosexuality, gender roles and sexual consent. Her works have been described as "untouched by the #MeToo movement". In 2023 Rishi Sunak, then-prime minister of Britain, revealed that some of his favourite books were part of the series.
