= Marcus Gilbert (actor) =

British actor (1958–2026)

- Born: 29 July 1958; Bristol, England
- Died: 11 January 2026 (aged 67)
- Occupation: Actor
- Years active: 1982–2015; 2026
- Spouse: Homaa Khan-Gilbert (m. 1992; died 2020)
- Children: 2

Marcus Gilbert (29 July 1958 – 11 January 2026) was a British actor.

Beginning in 1984 he appeared in films, including The Masks of Death (1984), Biggles (1986), A Hazard of Hearts (1987), Rambo III (1988), A Ghost in Monte Carlo (1990), Army of Darkness (1992), Legacy (1993) and Freebird (2008), on television (including Doctor Who in Battlefield in 1989), an episode of Murder, She Wrote (in 1994) and in commercials. He has also worked in the theatre, including playing the young Viscount Goring in Oscar Wilde's An Ideal Husband with the Middle Ground Theatre Company on their national tour in 2000.

== Early life and career ==
Gilbert was born in Bristol, England, on 29 July 1958. After graduating from the Mountview Theatre School in 1981, Gilbert became a founder member of the original Odyssey Theatre Company, touring London schools with productions of contemporary classics. This was followed by seasons working in the Dundee Repertory Theatre and the Library Theatre, Manchester.

Gilbert made over 50 commercials, including one for Lee Cooper jeans called Mean Jeans, directed by Willi Patterson, which won a British Arrows Pearl & Dean Cinema Award in 1983.

He also ran his own film production company, Touch the Sky Productions, and in 2004 while making a documentary about his climbing Mount Kilimanjaro he visited the Arusha Children's Trust in Tanzania and filmed an appeal for the trust.

== Personal life and death ==
Gilbert married a doctor named Homaa Khan-Gilbert, with whom he had two children. His wife of 28 years died in 2020. Gilbert died on 11 January 2026, at the age of 67, of throat cancer.

== Filmography ==
Key
†	Denotes film or TV productions that have not yet been released

Year	Title	Role	Notes
1983	The Weather in the Streets	Kurt	TV movie
1984	The Masks of Death	Anton von Felseck	TV movie
1986	Biggles	Eric von Stalhein	
1987	A Hazard of Hearts	Lord Justin Vulcan	TV movie
1988	Rambo III	Tomask	
1989	Doctor Who	Ancelyn	Serial: Battlefield
1990	A Ghost in Monte Carlo	Lord Robert Stanford	TV movie
1992	Army of Darkness	Lord Arthur	
1993	Legacy	David Walker	
1993	Riders	Rupert Campbell-Black	
1994	Murder, She Wrote	Colin Biddle	
2008	Freebird	Marl	
2015	Meet Pursuit Delange: The Movie	John Scott MP	
2026	UNIT: Brave New World: Knightfall †	Ancelyn	Voice role; posthumous release
