= Rupert Lycett Green =

British fashion designer (born 1938)

Rupert William Lycett Green (born 24 October 1938) is a British fashion designer known for his contribution to 1960s male fashion through his tailor's shop/boutique Blades in London.

== Early life ==
Lycett Green was born in England, the son of Commander David Cecil Lycett Green RN and Angela Courage (who later married Ralph Beckett, 3rd Baron Grimthorpe). His grandfather is Sir Edward Lycett Green, 2nd Baronet, and his great-grandfather is Sir Edward Green, 1st Baronet. He was educated at Eton College.

== Blades ==
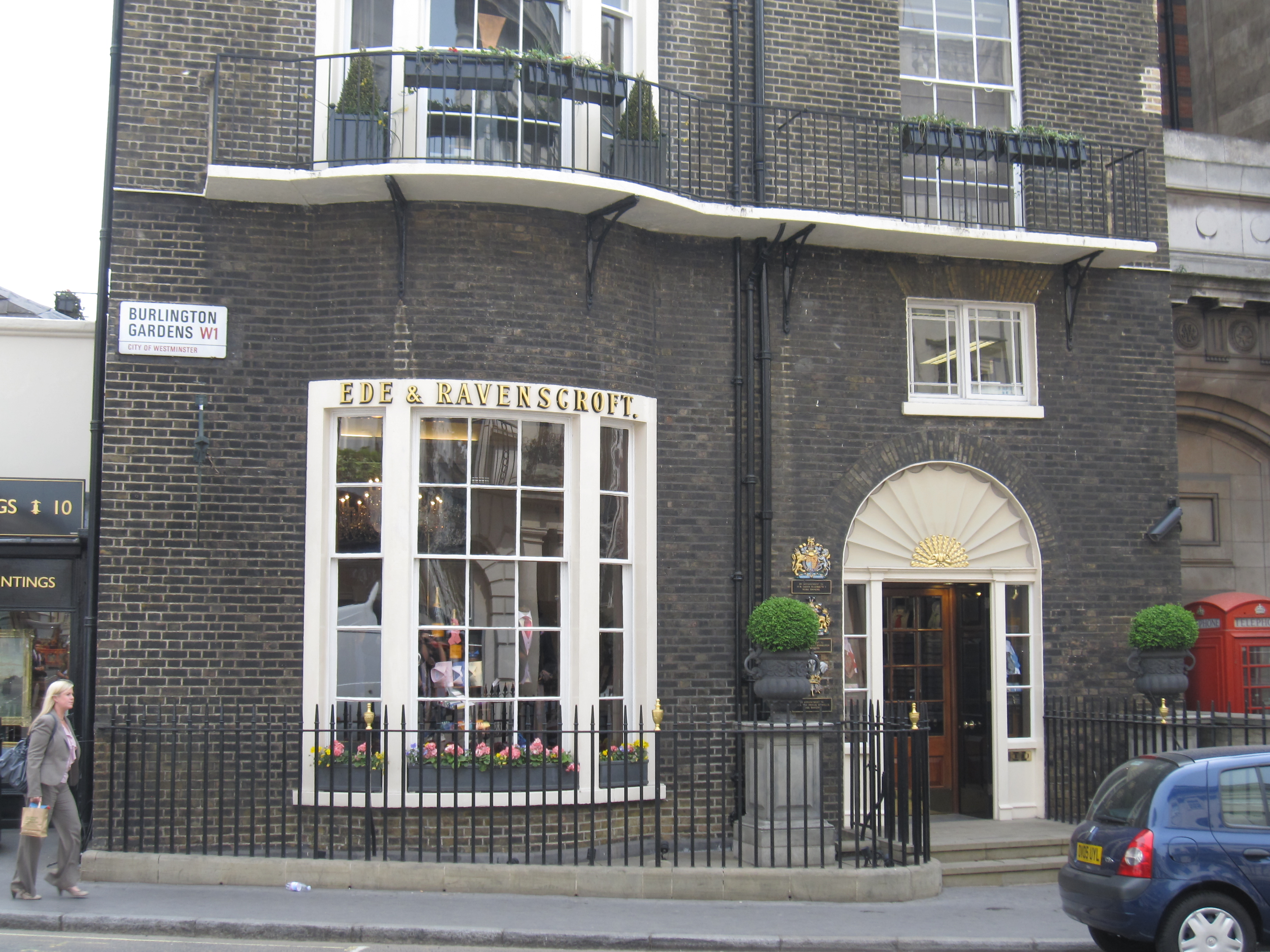
Blades' former Burlington Gardens shop, now Ede & Ravenscroft

In 1962, Lycett Green opened his shop Blades in Dover Street, London, with "high tailoring standards but a young man's view of cut and proportion". The shop's slogan was "for today rather than the memory of yesterday" and they offered high fashion ready-to-wear clothes. In 1965, John Crosby described Lycett Green's clothes as having "an elegance and a sort of look-at-me dash not seen since Edwardian times." In 1965, Cecil Beaton, a regular customer of Blades, stated "it's a marvellous combination of Carnaby Street Pizazz and Savile Row".

In 1967, Blades moved to Burlington Gardens, where the shop windows looked down on Savile Row itself. Customers included Mick Jagger, the then Marquess of Hartington and the Earl of St Germans.

Designs by Lycett Green are included in the collections of the Victoria and Albert Museum, the Metropolitan Museum of Art, and the Museum of London. One of his evening suits in black velvet was selected by Patrick Lichfield to represent 1971 in the Dress of the Year collection at the Fashion Museum, Bath, alongside a woman's outfit by Graziella Fontana. Today, the Burlington Gardens premises are occupied by the tailors Ede & Ravenscroft.

== Personal life ==
Lycett Green was married to the writer Candida Lycett Green, daughter of the poet John Betjeman, until her death on 19 August 2014. They married on 25 May 1963 and had five children. From 1973 to 1987 they owned the country house called Blackland House or Blackland Park, at Blackland near Calne in Wiltshire.

According to Nik Cohn in 1971, Lycett Green was "very tall and very skinny ... charming, quick with a quote and well equipped with enemies. All in all, he was a columnist's dream."

Lycett Green is one of three men upon whom Jilly Cooper's anti-hero Rupert Campbell-Black is based; the others are Andrew Parker Bowles and Michael Howard, Earl of Suffolk.

== See also ==
- Swinging London
