= Rivals (novel) =

1988 novel by Jilly Cooper

- Author: Jilly Cooper
- Audio read by: Sherri Baines, Georgia Tennant
- Language: English
- Genre: Romance novel
- Set in: 20th-century England
- Published: 1988 (Bantam)
- Publisher: Bantam, Ballantine Books (US)
- Publication date: 1988
- Publication place: United Kingdom
- Pages: 716
- ISBN: 0-552-15056-8
- OCLC: 51914043
- Preceded by: Riders
- Followed by: Polo
- Website: https://www.jillycooper.co.uk/books/rivals/

Rivals is a 1988 novel by English author Jilly Cooper. It is the second novel of the Rutshire Chronicles, a series of books set in the fictional English county of Rutshire. It was published as Players in the US. The novel is based on the competition for an independent television franchise in the Cotswolds. The incumbent franchisee is a company called Corinium Television, led by executive Tony Baddingham. A rival production company is established by Baddingham's former employee Declan O'Hara and Baddingham's nemesis Rupert Campbell-Black. They ultimately win the franchise, and Rupert falls in love with Declan's daughter Taggie.

Upon its release Cooper was accused of libel by Conservative councillor Bill Bullingham, which led to a name change to Baddingham in the paperback first edition. The Northampton Chronicle and Echo reviewed the novel saying it was "as easily digestible as a Jeffrey Archer, as saucy as a Jackie Collins, and with as much spice as a Dick Francis". In 2024 Disney+ released the television series Rivals, which led a resurgence of interest in the novel. Reviews that year praised the readability of the novel and its pace, but were also critical of its description of the desirability of teenage girls and its fatphobia. Former British prime minister Rishi Sunak, and journalists Caitlin Moran and Jess Cartner-Morley, are fans of the novel.

== Plot ==
Set in 1986, the novel is based around the competition for an independent television franchise in the Cotswolds in England. The incumbent franchisee is a company called Corinium Television, led by executive Tony Baddingham. The company produces regional television and programmes that it sells to other franchises, both in England and around the world. Baddingham, as part of efforts to keep the franchise, employs an American executive called Cameron Cooke who arrives at Corinium and quickly criticises how many of its programmes are produced, but her inventiveness improves many of them. As part of further efforts to retain the franchise, and impress a fictionalised version of the Independent Broadcasting Authority, Baddingham also employs Declan O'Hara who is an Irish primetime television interviewer. O'Hara has a reputation for broadcasting excellence and is induced to move to the area by Baddingham's offer of a high salary. O'Hara brings his wife, Maud, and two daughters Taggie and Caitlin with him; he also has a son Patrick. They move to a former monastery close to Rupert Campbell-Black's country house Penscombe.

The family gets to know Campbell-Black, although Declan O'Hara is initially hostile to him, egged on by Baddingham for whom Campbell-Black is his nemesis. Whilst work at Corinium begins well for O'Hara, he soon realises Baddingham is a bully and resigns. Along with Campbell-Black, O'Hara forms a television production company to try to win the franchise away from Corinium and Baddingham. Called Venturer, the board includes O'Hara, as well as Campbell-Black and other characters, including Freddie Jones, a working-class electronics millionaire, and many others. They also recruit members of Corinium's present staff and Rupert's best friend Billy Lloyd-Foxe, a former showjumper but now BBC commentator, to join them should they be successful. As a coup de grace, Rupert seduces Cameron Cooke and ultimately persuades her to also join Venturer. Campaigning for the franchise coincides with Campbell-Black's campaign to be re-elected as a Conservative MP, and he tours the district with Taggie who is getting people to sign a petition of support for Venturer. They fall in love. Nevertheless, there is a spy in the Venturer team, who turns out to be Declan's wife Maud, who was seduced by Baddingham. The novel ends with Venturer winning the franchise, Declan and Maud reconciling, Rupert and Taggie getting married, and Cameron Cooke - whose relationship with Rupert ended - getting together with Declan's son Patrick.

== Style and major themes ==
The novel was noted for its emphasis on sex, in keeping with the reputation for raunchiness that Cooper established with her previous novel Riders. Cooper became associated with "sweaty horseflesh, adulterous bonking and beautiful people with posh voices." In Rivals, Rupert Campbell-Black's development from a villain into a hero worthy of a happily-ever-after is linked to his development of more sexual skill, especially through oral sex. There is a common perception that girls at some British boarding schools share copies of the novel to learn about sex.

== Composition and publication ==
Rivals is the second novel in the Rutshire Chronicles series. To write the novel, Cooper worked 90 hours a week for 9 months in order to finish it. Cooper's publisher was initially sceptical about a novel centred on television, calling it a "boring subject".

The novel was published by Bantam Press, and first released in June 1988 as a 529-page hardcover edition. Half of the first print run was distributed through book clubs. Cooper's royalty rate was ten percent, rising to twelve and a half percent after a sales milestone. It was published as Players in the US. As of 2024, the novel had never been out of print.

The first paperback edition was published by Corgi in April 1989, featuring a major revision to the text: the character Anthony Bullingham was renamed to Baddingham. Upon hardback publication, Cooper was accused of libel by William Bullingham, a Conservative party councillor from Cheltenham who had shares in the Cotswold Cable TV Company. The case was based on similarities between William Bullingham and the character Anthony Bullingham. Cooper agreed to change the surname of the character to Baddingham as a result of the libel case. Cooper described the episode as "embarrassing".

== Reception ==
Rivals was an immediate financial success for Cooper, and a bestseller. It debuted at #2 on the Sunday Times bestseller list for hardback fiction on June 12, 1988. It spent 23 weeks on the list, through to January 22, 1989. The paperback edition debuted at #1 on the Sunday Times list, April 16, 1989. It spent 19 weeks on the list, through to September 10. Miranda Seymour in the Sunday Times identified Rivals as a "beach book": "a well-merchandised product, written to a formula, sold for the kind of money that attracts instant publicity, and promoted with all the razzamatazz of a new cosmetic product." The term "bonkbuster" is now used to capture both its blockbuster sales and its sex-heavy plot.

Andrew Sinclair, reviewing the novel in The Times, described Cooper's writing "as fast as her tongue" and praised its "pace and verve". The Northampton Chronicle and Echo reviewed the novel saying it was "as easily digestible as a Jeffrey Archer, as saucy as a Jackie Collins, and with as much spice as a Dick Francis". The Guardian described how the novel portrayed a Gloucestershire where "VIPs ... have replaced sheep" and focussed on its television franchise plot. Mary Kenny, writing in The Sunday Telegraph, praised Cooper's "lyrical [writing] about the Cotswold countryside", and also noted that Cooper excelled at writing about food and drink (the latter in particular). Kenny described how out of the hardback publication's 529 pages, 148 of them describe people getting drunk.

In North America, a review in Canada's Telegraph-Journal by Barbara Whalen was less complimentary, describing the "smutty, tasteless storyline" as over-written and requiring further editing, and criticising the characters as unbelievable. Geoffrey Molyneux, writing in The Province, questioned how popular the book would be in North America but described it as "a slice of Mrs Thatcher's Britain". He was also positive about its portrayal of innovation in the British television industry. Jeff Jarvis in the New York Times Book Review described the novel as "Brittwittery", a negative phrase that represented what Jarvis saw as trashiness with a particularly British quality. Jarvis also criticised the sex scenes, including a scene with a brief justification of violence against women, and Cooper's one-liners.

== Analysis ==
The novel had a lasting influence on the romance genre, with a 2023 retrospective describing it as "the Ur-text of classy bonkbusters". Journalist Caitlin Moran (formerly Catherine Moran) changed her name to Caitlin after reading the novel aged thirteen. Former British prime minister Rishi Sunak claimed in May 2023 that Rivals, along with other Cooper novels, were his favourite books.

After the release of the 2024 television adaptation, there was renewed interest in the novel. Journalist Jess Cartner-Morley described how if she ever featured on Desert Island Discs, her book of choice would be Rivals. Julia Venn, writing from a gen-z perspective in Cosmopolitan, praised the soap opera cast of characters and found the novel fast-paced, despite its 716 pages. Kimberley Bond, writing for Metro described the novel as "candyfloss fiction" and praised the fact the women in the novel have pubic hair. However she also expressed concern that it promoted a "desirability for young teenage girls" that is no longer appropriate, and that how women's weight is discussed was fatphobic. Marina Woods, writing in Varsity, described how to call the novel a "guilty pleasure" (as Sunak did), "undermines its quality". Daisy Buchanan in The Big Issue praised the book for its healthy representation of heterosexual women's desires.

== Adaptations ==
In 1991 Anglia TV bought the screening rights to both Riders and Rivals. It was first due to be adapted in 1992.

In 2022, Disney+ announced they would adapt the novel into a TV series of the same name. The series, starring David Tennant and Aidan Turner, was released on 18 October 2024. Writing for the London Review of Books, Ian Patterson was disappointed in the adaptation and felt it had lost some of Cooper's original pathos. It was renewed for a second series in December 2024 and filming began in May 2025; the new series will feature twelve episodes, four more than series one. The first six episodes were released in May 2026.
