= Los Angeles Olympics =

Los Angeles Olympics may refer to three different Olympic Games held or to be held in Los Angeles:

- 1932 Summer Olympics, Games of the X Olympiad
- 1984 Summer Olympics, Games of the XXIII Olympiad
- 2028 Summer Olympics, Games of the XXXIV Olympiad

== See also ==
- Several unsuccessful bids by Los Angeles to host the Summer Olympics
  - Los Angeles bid for the 2024 Summer Olympics
- 2015 Special Olympics World Summer Games
- 2028 Summer Paralympics
