= Ian Patterson (poet) =

British poet, translator and academic (born 1948)

- Born: 31 August 1948 (age 77)
- Occupations: Poet; translator; academic
- Spouses: Jenny Diski (m. 2008; died 2016); Olivia Laing (m. 2017)

Ian Kenneth Patterson (born 31 August 1948) is a British poet, translator and academic. He is a Life Fellow of Queens' College, Cambridge, having retired in 2018 from his post as Senior Lecturer in English Literature, Director of Studies in English and Fellow Librarian.

== Education and career ==
Ian Patterson was educated at Pembroke College, Cambridge, where he graduated with a BA degree in English in 1969. He returned to academia in the 1990s to write a PhD, and in 1995 was awarded a Junior Research Fellowship at King's College, Cambridge. In 1999 he moved to Queens', where he was to teach English as a fellow of the college for the next 20 years.

== Work ==
In 2017 Ian Patterson won the Forward Prize for best single poem for "The Plenty of Nothing", an elegy to his wife, Jenny Diski.

Patterson has written a non-fiction book about the bombing of Guernica and the Spanish Civil War. He is also a translator: works include the final volume of In Search of Lost Time by Marcel Proust and works by Charles Fourier and Alain Touraine. He is a regular contributor to the London Review of Books, writing on subjects as diverse as Jilly Cooper, libraries and Ann Quin.

== Personal life ==
Patterson was married to the writer Jenny Diski from 2008 until her death in 2016. He appears as The Poet in her writing. In 2017, he married the writer Olivia Laing. He is the editor of Nemo's Almanac, according to The Guardian "the world's hardest book quiz". Previous editors include Alan Hollinghurst.

== Awards and honours ==
- 2017 Forward Prize, Best Single Poem, "The Plenty of Nothing".

== Bibliography ==
=== Non-fiction ===
- Nemo's Almanac (Profile Books, 2017)
- Guernica and Total War (Profile Books, 2007)
- War and Literature (Boydell & Brewer, 2014), edited, with Laura Ashe
- Books: A Manifesto, or, How to Build a Library (Weidenfeld & Nicolson, 2025)

=== Poetry ===
- Thing of Reason (Black Suede Boot Press, 1974)
- Endless Demands (Holophrase, 1983)
- No Dice (Poetical Histories, 1988)
- Roughly Speaking (Cambridge, 1990)
- Tense Fodder (Equipage, 1993)
- Much More Pronounced (Equipage, 1999)
- Time to Get Here: Selected Poems 1969–2002 (Salt, 2003)
- The Glass Bell (Barque Press, 2009)
- Time Dust (Equipage, 2015)
- Still Life (Oystercatcher, 2015)
- Bound To Be (Equipage, 2017)
- Shell Vestige Disputed (Broken Sleep Books, 2023)
- Collected Poems 1975–2023 (Broken Sleep Books, 2024)

=== Translation ===
- Alain Touraine et al., The Workers' Movement (Cambridge University Press, 1987)
- Charles Fourier, The Theory of the Four Movements (Cambridge University Press, 1996)
- Marcel Proust, In Search of Lost Time, Vol. 6: Finding Time Again (Penguin, 2003)
