= Bonkbuster =

Subgenre of romance novels

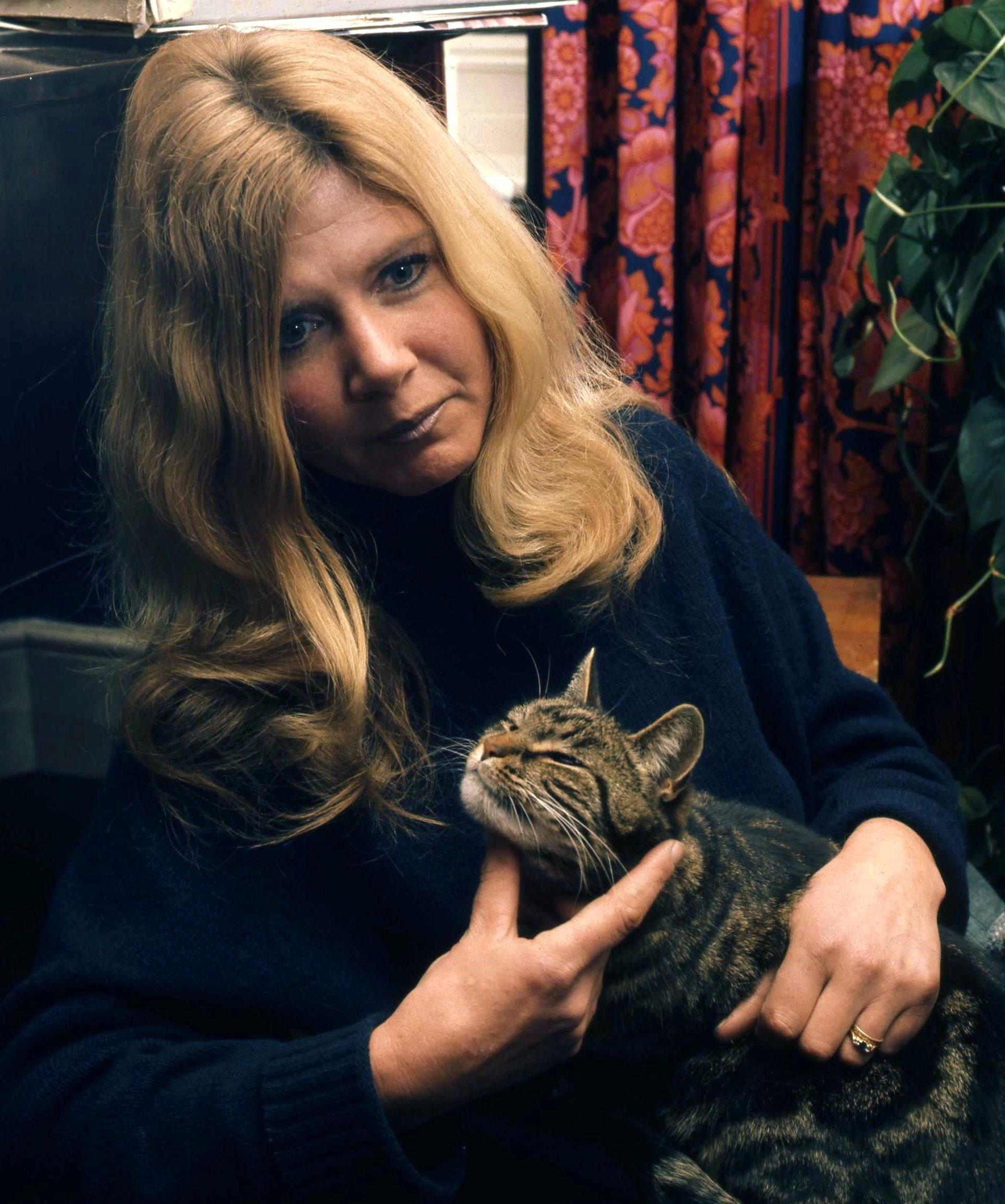
Jilly Cooper, a romance writer known for the Rutshire Chronicles, was considered "the queen of the bonkbuster".

Bonkbuster (a play on "blockbuster" and the verb "to bonk") is a term coined in 1988 by British writer Sue Limb to describe a subgenre of commercial romance novels in the 1970s and 1980s, as well as their subsequent miniseries adaptations. In 2002 the Oxford English Dictionary recognized this portmanteau, defining it as "a type of popular novel characterized by frequent explicit sexual encounters between the characters." In 2016, Jilly Cooper, who was called "the queen of the bonkbuster", suggested that the term ought to be updated to "shagbusters" as "bonk" felt out-of-date.

== Genre history ==
Although the term has been used generally to describe "bodice-rippers" such as Forever Amber (1944) by Kathleen Winsor, as well as the novels of Jacqueline Susann and Harold Robbins, it is specifically associated with the novels of Judith Krantz, Jackie Collins, Shirley Conran and Jilly Cooper, known for their glamorous, financially independent female protagonists and salacious storylines. In particular, Krantz's novel Scruples, which describes the glamorous and affluent world of high fashion in Beverly Hills, California, helped define the bonkbuster. In 2023, former British prime minister Rishi Sunak revealed that some of his favourite books were bonkbusters in the Rutshire Chronicles series by Cooper.

== Key texts ==
- Scruples by Judith Krantz
- Lace by Shirley Conran
- Hollywood Wives by Jackie Collins
- Riders by Jilly Cooper
