= Municipal Auditorium =

Municipal Auditorium may refer to:

== Places in the United States ==
=== Alabama ===
- Mobile Civic Center, previously known as the Municipal Auditorium
- Boutwell Memorial Auditorium, previously known as the Municipal Auditorium, in Birmingham

=== Arkansas ===
- Crossett Municipal Auditorium

=== California ===
- Riverside Municipal Auditorium

=== Colorado ===
- Denver Municipal Auditorium

=== Florida ===
- Municipal Auditorium-Recreation Club in Sarasota

=== Georgia ===
- Albany Municipal Auditorium
- Municipal Auditorium (Atlanta)
- Municipal Auditorium (Columbus, Georgia)
- Municipal Auditorium (Macon, Georgia)

=== Iowa ===
- Sioux City Municipal Auditorium

=== Louisiana ===
- Municipal Auditorium (New Orleans)
- Municipal Auditorium (Shreveport)

=== Missouri ===
- Municipal Auditorium (Kansas City, Missouri)

=== Nebraska ===
- Beatrice Municipal Auditorium, listed on the National Register of Historic Places (NRHP) in Gage County, Nebraska
- Fremont Municipal Auditorium, listed on the NRHP in Dodge County, Nebraska
- Wayne Municipal Auditorium, listed on the NRHP in Nebraska

=== New Mexico ===
- Mountainair Municipal Auditorium, listed on the NRHP in New Mexico

=== North Carolina ===
- Clayton Graded School and Clayton Grammar School-Municipal Auditorium

=== North Dakota ===
- Minot Municipal Auditorium
- Valley City Municipal Auditorium

=== Oklahoma ===
- Ardmore Municipal Auditorium listed on the NRHP in Carter County, Oklahoma
- Civic Center Music Hall in Oklahoma City, formerly known as the Municipal Auditorium

=== Oregon ===
- Keller Auditorium, formerly known as the Portland Municipal Auditorium, in Portland

=== Pennsylvania ===
- Municipal Auditorium (Philadelphia), now known as Philadelphia Convention Hall and Civic Center

=== Tennessee ===
- Nashville Municipal Auditorium

=== Texas ===
- San Antonio Municipal Auditorium

=== West Virginia ===
- Charleston Municipal Auditorium
