= Keene Memorial Library =

Public library in Fremont, Nebraska, U.S.

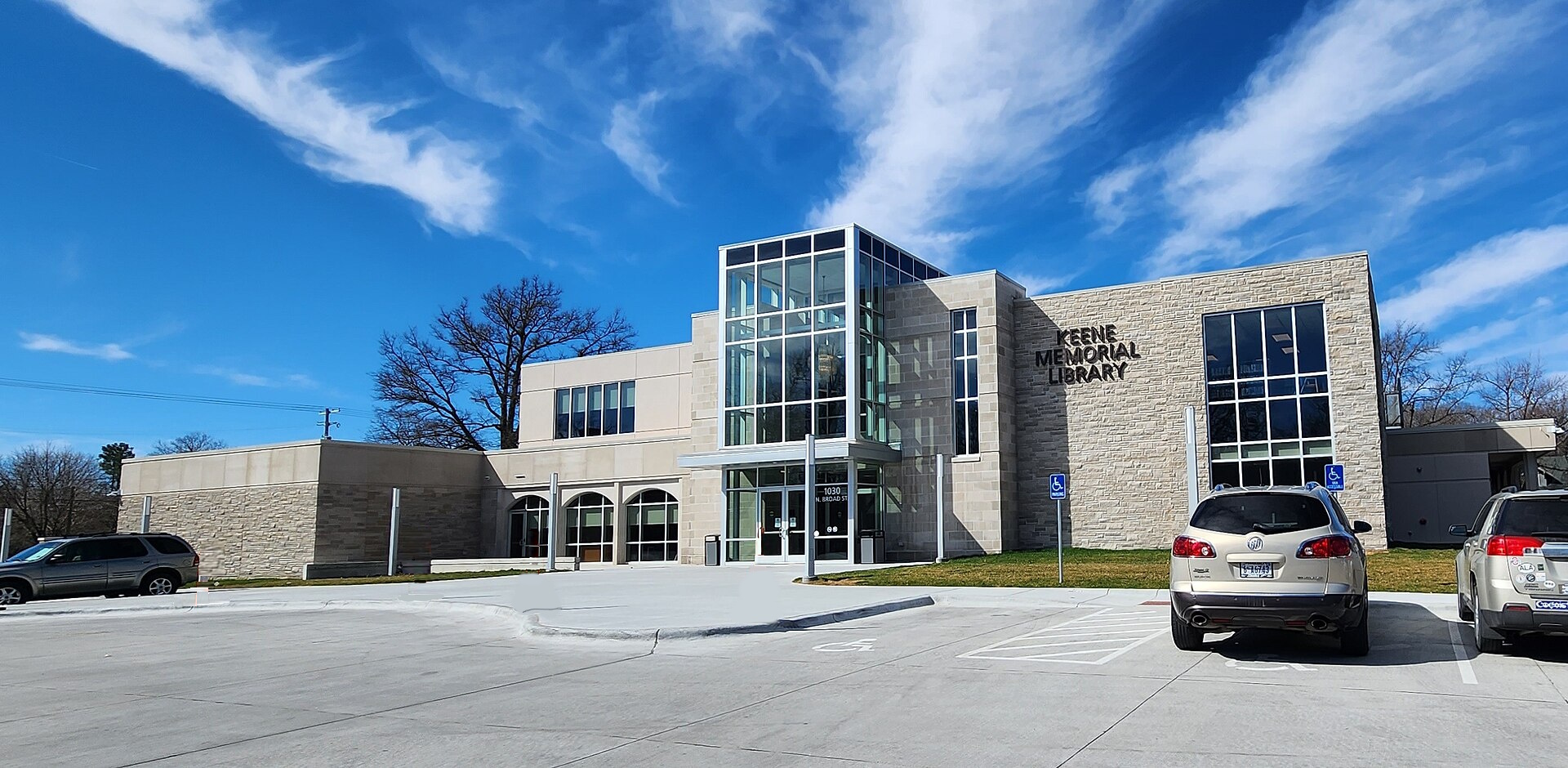
- Keene Memorial Library in 2024
- 41.439169°N 96.497511°W
- Location: 1030 N. Broad St., Fremont, Nebraska, U.S.

Other information
- Website: www.fremontne.gov/968/Library
- Building details

General information
- Year built: 1969–1971
- Opened: January 11, 1971
- Renovated: 2022–2024

Keene Memorial Library is a public library located in Fremont, Nebraska, United States. The library was established in 1971, replacing the Fremont Public Library, a Carnegie library, which opened in 1903. Fremont Public Library was built after Andrew Carnegie announced that he would make a $15,000 donation on the condition that the money be used to construct a public library. The library officially opened on March 6, 1903. Following the completion of Keene Memorial Library, Fremont Public Library was initially used as a youth canteen before being demolished in March 1973.

In 1968, plans were announced for a new library to be built, to be named the Keene Memorial Library. Construction started in 1969 and the library opened on January 11, 1971. In 2018, a $2 million bond issue was passed for the renovation and expansion of the library. Construction started in September 2022 and was completed in January 2024. The Fremont Municipal Auditorium was used as a temporary library during construction.

== History ==
=== Fremont Public Library ===
Fremont Public Library
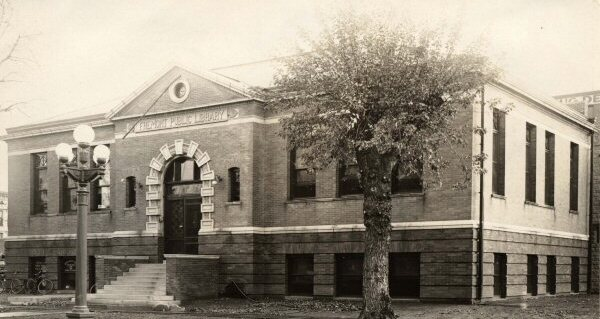
- 41.435515°N 96.496807°W
- Location: 640 N. Park Ave., Fremont, Nebraska
- Building details

General information
- Year built: 1902–1903
- Opened: March 6, 1903
- Demolished: March 1973

The original library was a Carnegie library established in 1903, known as the Fremont Public Library. Fremont Public Library was announced in January 1902 when Andrew Carnegie announced that he would make a $15,000 (or equivalent to ~$558,000 in 2025) donation on the condition that the money be used to construct a public library. The library officially opened on March 6, 1903.

Following the completion of the Keene Memorial Library, the original library was cleaned in preparation to become a youth canteen. The city attempted to sell the Fremont Public Library at auction several times, all but the final failing. In January 1973, it was announced that JB's Restaurants would be developing its Fremont location on the site of the former library. The library was demolished in late March of that same year.

=== Keene Memorial Library ===
In 1968, plans were announced for a new library to be built, to be named the Keene Memorial Library. The library, a two-story facility built with Indiana sandstone, would cost $700,000 (or equivalent to ~$6,480,000 in 2025.) Construction started in early fall of 1969, and by late December 1970, staff were ready to move to the new library. Keene Memorial Library opened on January 11, 1971.

In 2018, a $2 million bond was issued for renovation and expansion to the library. Demolition of the former residences was completed in 2020. In total, the project cost $10 million and officially started construction in September 2022. The Fremont Municipal Auditorium was used as a temporary library location. Construction was completed in January 2024.

In 2023, library board members unanimously voted to move the book This Book Is Gay from the young adult section to the adult section. Two people requested for the book to be removed completely. However, the library director decided to keep it.

== Architecture ==
Keene Memorial Library originally was 21,500 square feet (2,000 m^{2}) square feet when completed in 1971. The building was constructed using ashlar stone bricks and is two stories tall. Renovations and expansions increased the size of the building to 36,000 square feet (3,300 m^{2}).
