= Imogen (novel) =

1978 novel by Jilly Cooper

- Author: Jilly Cooper
- Language: English
- Genre: Romance
- Publication date: 1978
- Publication place: England
- Pages: 238
- Preceded by: Prudence
- Followed by: Lisa & Co
- Website: https://www.jillycooper.co.uk/books/imogen/

Imogen is a 1978 romance novel by Jilly Cooper. The plot follows a young woman, Imogen, as she is invited on a summer holiday to the French Riviera by her love interest, a professional tennis player called Nicky Beresford. On holiday, Imogen falls in love with someone else, which is ultimately reciprocated. It is the sixth novel in Cooper's romance series, although reviewers were mostly disappointed in the characterisation of Imogen as "spineless" and having little development in the novel.

== Plot ==
The story follows librarian Imogen Brocklehurst, whose claustrophobic upbringing by her vicar father in a Yorkshire village means she has had little experience of relationships or sex. She meets celebrity tennis player Nicky Beresford at a local match, who pursues her. He ultimately invites her on holiday to the French Riviera with his friends Matt and Cable, so that he can finally have sex with her. Imogen arrives on holiday with second-hand clothes and an unfashionable haircut, which does not compare her favourably with model Cable.

Matt, a famous journalist, and his partner Cable fight often on the holiday, and (perhaps to spite Cable) he takes Imogen to a hairdresser and buys her several new outfits. Both of these mean that many more people are impressed with her looks. Since Matt is so kind to her, and Nicky often cruel as he flirts with other women, she begins to fall in love with Matt. When Imogen rescues a drowning child, she doesn't realise the boy's parents are the people that Matt is desperate to interview. In return for saving their son's life they offer Imogen anything she would like, and she requests that they grant Matt an interview. This kindness, and others of Imogen's, eventually mean that Matt also falls in love with her.

== Characters ==
- Imogen Brocklehurst
- Nicky Beresford
- Matthew O'Connor
- Enid 'Cable' Sugden

== Reception ==
The novel is based on Cooper's short story The Holiday Makers, which was first published in the magazine 19. Upon publication The Bookseller described the novel as "clever stuff" with its intended audience a "semi-sophisticated" readership. The Observer described the novel as "puns-and needles" and stated that Cooper's writing "improved with every book". The following year, The Bookseller described the novel as the sixth in the romance series by Cooper, noting that the first five had sold over 340,000 copies. Later the same year, The Wokingham Times described Imogen as Cooper's "most spineless heroine" and suggested that readers only buy one of Cooper's books as the jokes are so similar across them. In contrast The Bolton News was sympathetic to the title character and described the novel as dealing with Imogen's "crisis of conscience in the face of a materialistic society" with "subtlety and delicacy".

Writing in 2011 in a piece about namesakes in literature, Imogen Russell Williams described how she was disappointed when she read the work, in that the character of Imogen was not transformed by love, and is the same "shy, virginal, and girlishly freckled" woman at the end. In a 2018 review of Cooper's works, Sarah Manning described how, as a younger reader, Imogen's seduction by someone "caddish" felt thrilling. She also described Imogen's character as "awkward". The same year Red magazine listed Imogen as one the best of Cooper's novels. In 2023 Irish journalist Emily Hourican stated she'd choose Imogen and the other novels in Cooper's romance series as her specialist subject on Mastermind.

== Analysis ==
The novel is cited as an example in academic texts on a variety of themes, including the allure of the French Riviera for Anglo-American culture, and a cultural analysis of cohabitation in the 1970s. In 2017 in her book The Gender Games, Bradford-born writer Juno Dawson described how her obsession with the "ultra-glam" covers of novels like Imogen as a child gave her a sense that she was not "very good at being a boy".
