= Dominika Dymińska =

Polish poet, novelist, and translator (born 1991)

- Born: 24 November 1991 (age 34); Warsaw, Poland
- Citizenship: Polish
- Education: University of Warsaw
- Occupations: poet, novelist, literary translator, linguist

Dominika Dymińska (born 24 November 1991) is a Polish poet, novelist, literary translator and linguist.

Her poem was included in the anthology Wolny wybór: stulecie wierszy 1918–2018 edited by Piotr Śliwiński.

== Selected works ==
=== Novels ===
- Mięso. Warsaw: Wydawnictwo Krytyki Politycznej. 2012. ISBN 978-83-62467-67-9.

=== Poetry books ===
- Danke: czyli nigdy więcej. Warsaw: Wydawnictwo Krytyki Politycznej. 2016. ISBN 978-83-64682-92-6.
- Pozdrowienia ze świata. Kraków: Korporacja Ha!art. 2017. ISBN 978-83-65739-24-7.
- Milch. Warsaw: Staromiejski Dom Kultury. 2019.

=== Translations ===
- Dawson, Juno (2016). Tęczowa książeczka: poradnik dla nastolatków. Warsaw: Wydawnictwo Krytyki Politycznej. ISBN 978-83-65369-14-7.
- Armstrong, Jennifer Keishin; Rudúlph, Heather Wood (2016). Feminizm jest sexy: przewodnik dla dziewczyn o miłości, sukcesie i stylu. Warsaw: Wydawnictwo Krytyki Politycznej. ISBN 978-83-65369-42-0. Originally released as Sexy Feminism: A Girl's Guide to Love, Success, and Style.
- Safina, Carl (2018). Poza słowami. Co myślą i czują zwierzęta. Warsaw: Wydawnictwo Krytyki Politycznej. ISBN 9788365853660. Originally released as Beyond Words: What Animals Think and Feel.
- Foer, Jonathan Safran (2019). Zjadanie zwierząt. Warsaw: Wydawnictwo Krytyki Politycznej. ISBN 978-83-66232-45-7.

== Awards and honours ==
In 2008, she won 2nd prize in the National Competition for the Debut Book of Poetry (Ogólnopolski Konkurs na Debiutancką Książkę Poetycką) of the quarterly "Opcje". In November 2012 she received Nagroda Warszawskiej Premiery Literackiej for the book Mięso. In 2017 she was nominated to Nike Award for Danke: czyli nigdy więcej. In 2018 she won 2nd prize in the Zygmunt Krukowski National Poetry Competition. Also in 2018 she won 2nd prize in the Rafał Wojaczek National Poetry Competition.
