= Cohabitation =

Living arrangement for unmarried couples

Cohabitation is an arrangement where people who are not legally married live together as a couple. They are often involved in a romantic or sexually intimate relationship on a long-term or permanent basis. Such arrangements have become increasingly common in Western countries since the late 20th century, led by changing social views, especially regarding marriage. The term dates from the mid 16th century, being used with this meaning as early as 1530.

== Social changes leading to increase ==
Percentage of births to unmarried women, selected countries, 1980 and 2007

Cohabitation is a common pattern among people in the Western world.

In Europe, the Scandinavian countries began this trend, although many countries have since followed. Mediterranean Europe has traditionally been very conservative, with religion playing a strong role. Until the mid-1990s, cohabitation levels remained low in this region, but have since increased; for example, in Portugal the majority of children have been born of unwed parents since 2015, constituting 60% of the total in 2021.

In the United States, over the past few decades there has been an increase in unmarried couples cohabiting. Historically, Western countries have been influenced by Christian doctrine on sex, which opposes unmarried cohabitation. As social norms have changed, such beliefs have become less widely held and some Christian denominations view cohabitation as a precursor to marriage. Pope Francis has performed the marriages of cohabiting couples who had children, while former archbishop of Canterbury Rowan Williams and the archbishop of York John Sentamu have expressed tolerance of cohabitation.

In recent decades, high rates of participation of women in the workforce and the widespread availability of highly effective long acting reversible contraceptives has led to women making individual choices over their reproduction with decreased reliance on male partners for financial stability. All these changes favored alternative living arrangements to marriage.

In Central and Eastern Europe, during the late 1980s and early 1990s, there were major political changes, such as the fall of Communist governments. These societies entered a new era of increased social freedom, less rigid rules, and less authoritarian governments. They interacted with Western Europe and some became members of the European Union. As a result, the patterns of family life started to change: marriage rates have declined, and marriage was postponed to a later age. Cohabitation and births to unmarried mothers increased, and in some countries the increase was quick.

The deinstitutionalization of marriage refers to the weakening of the social and legal norms that regulate peoples' behavior in regard to marriage. The rise in cohabitation is part of other major social changes such as higher divorce rate, older age at first marriage and childbearing, and more births outside marriage. Factors such as secularization, increased participation of women in the labor force, changes in the meaning of marriage, risk reduction, individualism, and changing views on sexuality have been cited as contributing to these social changes. There has also been a change in modern sexual ethics, with a focus on consent, rather than marital status (i.e. decriminalization of adultery and fornication; criminalization of marital rape), reflecting new concepts on the role and purpose of sexual interaction, and new conceptualizations of female sexuality and of self-determination. There have been objections against the legal and social regulation of female sexuality; with such regulations being often seen as violations of women's rights. (Note: High Commissioner for Human Rights Navi Pillay has called for full respect and recognition of women's autonomy and sexual and reproductive health rights, stating: "Violations of women's human rights are often linked to their sexuality and reproductive role. Women are frequently treated as property, they are sold into marriage, into trafficking, into sexual slavery. (...) In many countries, married women may not refuse to have sexual relations with their husbands, and often have no say in whether they use contraception. (...) Ensuring that women have full autonomy over their bodies is the first crucial step towards achieving substantive equality between women and men. Personal issues – such as when, how and with whom they choose to have sex, and when, how and with whom they choose to have children – are at the heart of living a life in dignity.") In addition, some individuals may feel that marriage is unnecessary or outdated, leading to couples not formalizing their relation. For instance, in the European Values Study (EVS) of 2008, the percentage of respondents who agreed with the assertion that "Marriage is an outdated institution" was 37.5% in Luxembourg, 35.4% in France, 34.3% in Belgium, 31.2% in Spain, 30.5% in Austria, 29.2% in Germany, 27.7% in Switzerland, 27.2% in Bulgaria, 27.0% in the Netherlands, 25.0% in Slovenia.

The fact that many couples choose to live together without formalizing their relation is also recognized by the European Union. A 2004 directive forbids EU members from denying entry or residence of partners "with whom the Union citizen has a durable relationship, duly attested".

== Reasons for cohabitation in the United States ==
Cohabitation in the United States is often a part of the dating process. In fact, "cohabitation is increasingly becoming the first coresidential union formed among young adults". By 1996, more than two-thirds of married couples in the US said that they lived together before getting married. "In 1994, there were 3.7 million cohabiting couples in the United States." This is a major increase from a few decades earlier. According to Dr. Galena Rhoades, "Before 1970, living together outside marriage was uncommon, but by the late 1990s at least 50% to 60% of couples lived together premaritally." Despite this, legal bans on cohabitation for unmarried couples were only acknowledged to have historically existed in the states of Mississippi, Michigan, Florida, Arizona, Idaho, Maine, New Mexico, North Carolina, North Dakota, Virginia, and West Virginia. It has also been acknowledged that these laws eventually became unenforced over time. By 2023, Mississippi was the only state to have such a law in the books criminalizing the practice.

People may live together for a number of reasons. Cohabitants could live together to save money, or because of the convenience of living with another, or a need to find housing. Lower income individuals facing financial uncertainty may delay or avoid marriage, not only because of the cost of a wedding but also because of fear of financial hardship if a marriage were to end in divorce.

When responding to a survey of the reasons for cohabitation, most couples listed reasons such as spending more time together, convenience-based reasons, and testing their relationships, while few gave the reason that they do not believe in marriage. The extremely high costs of housing and tight budgets of the economy are also factors that can lead a couple to cohabitation.

Sixty percent of all marriages are preceded by a period of cohabitation. Researchers suggest that couples live together as a way of trying out marriage to test compatibility with their partners, while still having the option of ending the relationship without legal implications. In 1996, "More than three-quarters of all cohabitors report[ed] plans to marry their partners, which implies that most of them viewed cohabitation as a prelude to marriage." Cohabitation shares many qualities with marriage. Often couples who are cohabiting share a residence, personal resources, exclude intimate relations with others, and more than 10% of cohabiting couples have children. "Many young adults believe cohabitation is a good way to test their relationships prior to marriage." Couples who have plans to marry before moving in together or who are engaged before cohabiting typically marry within two years of living together. The state of cohabitation of a couple often ends either in marriage or in break-up; according to a 1996 study about 10% of cohabiting unions remained in this state more than five years. According to a survey done by The National Center for Health Statistics, "over half of marriages from 1990 to 1994 among women began as cohabitation."

Cohabitation can be an alternative to marriage in situations where marriage is not possible for legal or religious reasons (such as same-sex, interracial or interreligious marriages).

Cohabitation, sometimes called de facto marriage, is becoming a more common substitute for conventional marriage. Common-law marriage in the United States can still be contracted in nine US states, and in two others under restriction. (Note: "Eleven states recognize common-law marriages currently being established within their borders. They are Alabama, Colorado, Iowa, Kansas, Montana, New Hampshire, Oklahoma, Rhode Island, South Carolina, Texas and Utah." However, in New Hampshire, common law marriage is recognized only posthumously, for purposes of probate only, and Utah recognizes common-law marriages only if they have been validated by a court or administrative order.) This helps provide the surviving partner a legal basis for inheriting the decedent's belongings in the event of the death of their cohabiting partner. In modern cohabiting relationships, forty percent of households include children, giving an idea of how cohabitation could be considered a new normative type of family dynamic. In 2012, 41% of all births in the US were to unmarried women. In three states (Mississippi – 55%, Louisiana – 53%, and New Mexico – 52%) births outside marriage were in the majority; the lowest percentage of births outside marriage was in Utah, at 19%. During the period 2006–2010, 58% of births outside marriage were to cohabiting parents.

== Contemporary objections to cohabitation ==
Contemporary objections to cohabiting couples include religious opposition to non-marital unions, social pressure for couples to get married, and potential effects of cohabitation on a child's development.

The rise in the number of cohabiting couples and children born out of wedlock in the Western world has made cohabitation a strong focus of sociological research. The rise in cohabiting couples in the United States, from around 450,000 in 1960 to 7.5 million in 2011 has been accompanied by US research performed on child development within cohabiting households. Opponents of cohabitation say non-marital parenting is an unsuitable environment for a child's development. One study from 2002 correlated lower numeracy skills and higher delinquency to children of cohabiting couples; however, recent studies that control for factors including poverty, the educational level of parents and violence in the home show children of cohabiting couples are developmentally similar to peers of comparable married couples.

=== Effect on children ===
In 2001, researchers compared teenage children in the United States living in a cohabiting household (a single mother and her boyfriend who was not related to the teenager) against peers in single-parent households. The results showed white and Hispanic teenagers had lower performance in school, greater risk of suspension or expulsion than peers from single-parent households, and the same rate of behavioral and emotional problems.

A study on the 1995 and 2002 National Survey of Family Growth found increases in both the prevalence and duration of unmarried cohabitation. The study found that 40% of children in the United States would live in a cohabiting household by age 12, and children born to single mothers were more likely than those born to married mothers to live in a cohabiting household. The percentage of women ages 19–44 who had ever cohabited increased from 45% in 1995 to 54% in 2002.

In 2002, 63% of women who graduate from high school were found to spend some time cohabiting, compared to only 45% of women with a four-year college degree. Cohabiting couples who have children often get married. One study found that children born of parents who cohabit are 90% more likely to end up living in households with married parents than children born to single mothers. 67% of unmarried Hispanic mothers are expected to marry, while 40% of African American mothers are expected to marry.

=== Religious views ===
Studies have found that religious affiliation correlates with cohabitation and marriage entry. People frequently cite religious reasons for their opposition to cohabitation. The Roman Catholic Church and nearly all mainstream Protestant denominations around the world oppose cohabitation and consider it to be the sin of fornication. However, others, such as the Church of England "welcome cohabiting couples in the Church and encourage them to regard cohabitation as a prelude to Christian marriage".

Religion can also lead to societal pressures against cohabitation especially within highly religious communities. Some couples may refrain from cohabitation because one or both partners fear disappointing or alienating conservative family members. Young adults who grew up in families that oppose cohabitation have lower rates than their peers.

The increase in cohabitation in the United States and other developed nations has been linked to the secularization of those countries. Researchers have noted that changes in the religious demographics of a society have accompanied the rise in cohabitation.

Non-marital and same-sex relationships are forbidden by the Islamic law of Zina, and cohabitation is against the law in many Muslim majority countries including Saudi Arabia, Pakistan, Afghanistan, Iran, Kuwait, Maldives, Morocco, Oman, Mauritania, Sudan, and Yemen.

== Effects on marriage and family life ==
=== Likelihood of split ===
Conflicting studies on the effect of cohabitation on subsequent marriage have been published. In countries where the majority of people disapprove of unmarried individuals living together, or a minority of the population cohabits before marriage, marriages resulting from cohabitation are more prone to divorce. But in a study on European countries, those where around half of the population cohabits before marriage, cohabitation is not selective of divorce-prone individuals, and no difference in couples that have cohabited before and after marriage is observed. In countries such as Italy, the increased risk of marital disruption for people who experienced premarital cohabitation can be entirely attributed to the selection of the most divorce-prone into cohabitation.

In 2002, the CDC found that for married couples the likelihood percentage of the relationship ending after five years is 20%, for unmarried cohabitators the likelihood percentage is 49%. After 10 years the likelihood percentage for the relationship to end is 33% for married couples and 62% for unmarried cohabitators. One German study found that in regions with high rates of childbirth to cohabitating parents, no negative effect is observed in cohabitation. The study states "union stability of cohabiting mothers is positively related to their prevalence".

A 2004 study of 136 couples (272 individuals) from researchers at the University of Denver found differences among couples that cohabited before engagement, after engagement, or not until marriage. The longitudinal study collected survey data before marriage and 10 months into marriage, with findings suggesting those who cohabit before engagement are at greater risk for poor marital outcomes than those who cohabit only after engagement or at marriage. A follow-up survey by the researches of over 1,000 married men and women married in the past 10 years found those who moved in with a lover before engagement or marriage reported significantly lower quality marriages and a greater possibility of a separation than other couples. About 20% of those who cohabited before getting engaged had since suggested splitting – compared with only 12% of those who only moved in together after getting engaged and 10% who did not cohabit prior to marriage.

Another 2004 study of 92 couples linked communication to cohabitation and instability. They found that married couples who cohabited before they were married had more negative problem-solving and communication skills. They also found that those who had cohabited expressed more (verbal) aggression throughout their conversations. This negative communication could be contributing to the cohabitation effect and causing a larger amount of marital instability.

The researchers from Denver suggest that relationships with pre-engagement cohabitation "may wind up sliding into marriage", whereas those that only cohabit post engagement or marriage make a more clear decision. This could explain their 2006 study of 197 heterosexual couples finding that men who cohabited with their spouse before engagement were less dedicated than men who cohabited only after engagement or not at all before marriage. In some heterosexual couples, women are more likely to understand cohabitation as an intermediary step preceding marriage, and men more likely to perceive it without an explicit connection to marriage.

An analysis of data from the CDC's National Survey of Family Growth data from 1988, 1995, and 2002 suggests that the positive relationship between premarital cohabitation and marital instability has weakened for more recent birth and marriage cohorts, as the total number of couples cohabiting before marriage has increased.

Later CDC work found that between 2002 and 2006-2010, the number of couples in opposite-sex cohabiting relationships increased from 9.0% to 11.2% for women, and from 9.2% to 12.2% for men. Drawing on the 2006–2008 data, Princeton University researchers examined whether and to what extent variation in premarital cohabitation experiences influence marital stability. They found that the relationship between cohabitation and marital instability is complex and depends in part on marriage cohort, race/ethnicity, and marriage plans. Their analyses reveal that a 'cohabitation effect' exists only for women married prior to 1996, and that, until marriage plans are considered, there is no cohabitation effect among women married since 1996.

Recent research from 2011 by the Pew Research Center has found that the number of couples that cohabit before marriage has increased. 44% of adults (and more than half of 30- to 49-year-olds) say they have cohabited at some point. Nearly two-thirds of adults who ever cohabited (64%) say they thought about it as a step toward marriage. The report also notes a trend toward rising public acceptance of cohabiting couples over the years. Most Americans now say the rise in unmarried couples living together either makes no difference to society (46%) or is good for society (9%).

A 2012 study found that, among cohabiting individuals, those who were engaged prior to cohabitation or had "definite plans for marriage" were linked to lower risks of marital instability among women, but the relationship was not observed with men.

One study on low to moderate income couples living with minor children found that respondents who became sexually involved within the first month of their relationship were correlated to lower scores of relationship quality among women. Another study found respondents to a mail-in survey self-reported higher levels of commitment in the cohabiting group, as well as lower relationship satisfaction and more negative communication.

A 2018 study found that cohabiting before marriage was linked to a lower risk of divorce during the first year of marriage, but a greater risk of divorce in the long run. However, a report published by the Council on Contemporary Families that same year found that couples who cohabited before marriage were less likely to divorce than couples who did not.

=== Abuse and infidelity ===
University of Chicago sociologist Linda Waite found that "16 percent of cohabiting women reported that arguments with their partners became physical during the past year, while only 5 percent of married women had similar experiences." Most cohabiting couples have a faithful relationship, but Waite's surveys also demonstrated that 20% of cohabiting women reported having secondary sex partners, compared to only 4% of married women.

According to an article by Judith Treas and Deirdre Giesen, cohabiting couples are twice as likely to experience infidelity within the relationship than married couples.

=== Fertility ===
Regarding cohabitation as a fertility factor, a large survey in the United States came to the result that married women had an average of 1.9 children, compared to 1.3 among those cohabiting. The corresponding numbers for men were 1.7 and 1.1, respectively. The difference of 0.6 children for both sexes was expected to decrease to between 0.2 and 0.3 over the lifetime when correcting for the confounder that married people have their children earlier in life.

A study of the United States and multiple countries in Europe came to the result that women who continue to cohabit after birth have significantly lower probability of having a second child than married women in all countries except those in Eastern Europe. Another study, on the contrary, came to the result that cohabiting couples in France have equal fertility as married ones. Also, Russians have a higher fertility within cohabitation, while Romanians rather tend to have childless marriages.

Survey data from 2003 in Romania came to the result that marriage equalized the total fertility rate among both highly educated and low educated people to approximately 1.4. Among those cohabiting, on the other hand, lower level of education increased fertility rate to 1.7, and a higher level of education decreased it to 0.7. On the other hand, another study came to the result that Romanian women with little education have about equal fertility in marital and cohabiting partnerships.

=== Financial effects ===
In the United States, married couples that submit a combined tax return may face a marriage penalty, where tax credits for low-income single earners are not applied to the combined income. In October 1998, Senate GOP leader Trent Lott decided to pull a bill to abolish "the marriage penalty, which in the tax code reflects the fact that married couples who both work for wages frequently pay more in taxes than if they earned the same amount of income but weren't married. And the more equal the incomes of the couple, the steeper the marriage tax penalty." The earned income tax credit (EITC) is cash welfare for low-income workers, but the problem is the EITC is not for married couples because they have to combine their wages, which again leads to "the marriage penalty". If couples do not get married then their wages do not have to combine and the EITC in a way is "paying for" low-income couples not to marry. Opponents of cohabitation believe that some cohabiting couples choose not to marry because they would suffer a tax penalty.

Despite the perceived disincentive to marry that the EITC provides, cohabiting couples suffer many financial losses as their unions are not recognized with the same legal and financial benefits as those who are legally married. These financial penalties can include the costs of separate insurance policies and the costs of setting up legal protections similar to those that are automatically granted by the state upon marriage.

=== No effect ===
A conflicting study, published by the National Center for Health Statistics, with a sample of 12,571 people, concludes that "those who live together after making plans to marry or getting engaged have about the same chances of divorcing as couples who never cohabited before marriage".

Additionally, William Doherty, a professor in the Department of Family Social Science at the University of Minnesota has remarked that in his research he has found that "committed cohabiting relationships seem to confer many of the benefits of marriage".

A 2003 study by the Australian Institute of Family Studies found that "The differences in measured outcomes for those from direct and indirect marriages appear to be entirely attributable to other factors." The study concluded that the evidence suggests that premarital cohabitation has "little impact one way or the other" on the chances of any subsequent marriage surviving.

== By region ==
=== Americas ===
==== Canada ====
Cohabitation is very common in Quebec. From 1995, the majority of births in Quebec are from unmarried couples.

Canadian laws on the recognition of unmarried cohabitation for legal purposes vary significantly by province/territory; and in addition to this, federal regulations also have an impact across the country (see Common-law marriage#Canada). Family formation has undergone significant changes in Canada during the last decades of the 20th century, but the patterns vary widely across the country, suggesting differing cultural norms in different regions. From 1995, births to cohabiting parents have increased, particularly in Quebec. In Canada, it is difficult to obtain exact data on the percentage of births outside marriage, because data on the marital status of mothers is collected differently across the provinces and territories of Canada, and in some (such as Alberta) it is not broken down in detail in regard to whether the mother was legally married at the birth of her child. (Note: In 2003, "Alberta Registries amended their Registration of Birth form in such a way that Statistics Canada can no longer determine the legal marital status of those persons in common-law marriages".) As of 2012, the statistical category of "single mothers" (defined as never married at the time of the birth) encompassed 28.3% of mothers, the category "divorced" (i.e. mothers who were unmarried at the time of birth, but had been previously married during their lives) encompassed 1%, while for 10% of mothers the marital status was unknown ("not stated"). There are, however, very significant differences by province/territory; for example in 2012, 77.8% of births in Nunavut were listed to "single mothers", by contrast, less than 20% of mothers in Ontario were listed in this category. Latest data from the Quebec Statistical Institute shows that as of 2015, in Quebec, 63% of children were born to unmarried women. In Canada, legal issues regarding cohabitation are complicated by the fact that family law in this regard differs by province/territory, which is confusing to the public, as this contrasts to criminal law which is uniform across Canada, as well as to marriage and divorce law, which is also the same across the country, under the 1986 Divorce Act (Canada) (although provinces/territories have jurisdiction over some marital issues, including the solemnization of marriage, spousal and child support, and property division). The marital status of Canadians also varies by province/territory: in 2011, 46.4% of the population aged 15 and over was legally married; ranging from the lowest percentage of married people in Nunavut (29.7%), Northwest Territories (35.0%), Quebec (35.4%), and Yukon (37.6%); to highest in Newfoundland and Labrador (52.9%), Prince Edward Island (51.7%), Ontario (50.3%) and Alberta (50.2%). While Quebec is known for liberal family formation and cohabitation, this is a recent development: during the first half of the 20th century, family life in the province was conservative and strongly dominated by Roman Catholicism; before 1968, there was no provincial divorce legislation in Quebec, and spouses could only end their marriage if they obtained a private act of Parliament. One explanation of the high rates of cohabitation in Quebec is that the traditionally strong social control of the church and Catholic doctrine over people's private relations and sexual morality has led the population to rebel against traditional, conservative social values. While some provinces were early to modernize family law, in others this only occurred in the 1990s and the 21st century, such as in Alberta, through the Family Law Act (Alberta) which came into force in 2005. This Act overhauled family legislation, replacing the Domestic Relations Act, the Maintenance Order Act, the Parentage and Maintenance Act, and parts of the Provincial Court Act and the Child, Youth and Family Enhancement Act, which were seen as outdated. Also, the Adult Interdependent Relationships Act (S.A. 2002, c. A-4.5) amended 69 Alberta laws. The Canadian Prairies provinces of Manitoba and Saskatchewan have strong common-law spousal. regulations, imposing rights and obligations on common-law couples. Nova Scotia has also been very slow to advance family law – it was only in 1999 that this province abolished discrimination against "illegitimate" children with regard to inheritance (through section 16 of NS Intestate Succession Act amended in 1999). In general, provinces in Western Canada give more rights to common-law spouses than those in Atlantic Canada and in Quebec. This may seem paradoxical, because the eastern provinces have the strongest tradition of cohabitation; according to a study "unmarried cohabitation seems to be more common in Eastern Canada than in Western Canada, which might be related to internal and international migration". (as of 2012, 48% of births in New Brunswick, 47.1% in Newfoundland and Labrador, and 45.2% in Nova Scotia, were listed to "single mothers", way above the national average). In British Columbia, the Family Law Act came into force in 2013.

==== United States ====
Public approval in the United States for cohabiting couples has risen since 1994. Agree Neither agree nor disagree Disagree

Cohabitation in the United States became common in the late 20th century. As of 2005, 4.85 million unmarried couples were living together, and as of 2002, about half of all women aged 15 to 44 had lived unmarried with a partner. In 2007, it is estimated that 6.4 million households were maintained by two opposite sex persons who said they were unmarried. In 2012, the General Social Survey found that public disapproval of cohabitation had dropped to 20% of the population.

Researchers at the National Center for Family and Marriage Research estimated in 2011 that 66% of first marriages are entered after a period of cohabitation. According to the 2009 American Community Survey conducted by the Census Bureau, the proportion of 30- to 44-year-olds living together has almost doubled since 1999, from 4% to 7%. Fifty-eight percent of women aged 19 to 44 had ever cohabited in data collected in 2006–08, while in 1987 only 33% had. Cohabitation is more prevalent among those with less education. "Among women ages 19 to 44, 73% of those without a high school education have ever cohabited, compared with about half of women with some college (52%) or a college degree (47%)," note the Pew study's authors, Richard Fry and D'Vera Cohn.

Before the mid-20th century, laws against cohabitation, fornication, adultery and other such behaviors were common in the US (especially in Southern and Northeastern states), but these laws have been gradually abolished or struck down by courts as unconstitutional.

Cohabitation was almost impossible in the United States prior to the 1960s. Laws prevented unmarried couples from registering in hotels and it was very difficult for an unmarried couple to obtain a home mortgage. From 1960 to 1998, cohabitation moved from disreputable and difficult to normal and convenient.

— "The First Measured Century: Social disruptions". PBS.

As of December 2023, cohabitation of unmarried couples remains illegal in two states (Mississippi and North Carolina), while as of 2023 fornication remains illegal in two states (Georgia and South Carolina). These laws are almost never enforced and are now believed to be unconstitutional since the legal decision Lawrence v. Texas in 2003. However, these laws may have indirect effects. For example, one consequence may be that one may not claim their partner as a dependent (for a tax exemption), whereas in the other states it may be possible to do so after meeting four criteria: residency, income, support and status.

In 2006, in North Carolina, Pender County Superior Court judge Benjamin G. Alford ruled that North Carolina's cohabitation law is unconstitutional. However, the Supreme Court of North Carolina has never had the opportunity to rule on it, so the law's statewide constitutionality remains unclear.

On 13 December 2013, US Federal judge Clark Waddoups ruled in Brown v. Buhman that the portions of Utah's anti-polygamy laws which prohibit multiple cohabitation were unconstitutional, but also allowed Utah to maintain its ban on multiple marriage licenses. This decision was overturned by the United States Court of Appeals for the Tenth Circuit, thus effectively recriminalizing polygamy as a felony. In 2020, Utah voted to downgrade polygamy from a felony to an infraction, but it remains a felony if force, threats or other abuses are involved. Unlawful cohabitation, where prosecutors did not need to prove that a marriage ceremony had taken place (only that a couple had lived together), had been a major tool used to prosecute polygamy in Utah since the 1882 Edmunds Act.

==== Latin America ====
Cohabitation in Latin America is becoming more common. Indeed, although this is a largely Roman Catholic region, it has the highest rates of non-marital childbearing in the world (55–74% of all children in this region are born to unmarried parents). In Mexico, 18.7% of all couples were cohabiting as of 2005. Among young people, the figures are much higher.

As of 2000, in Argentina 58% of births were to unmarried women. (Note: The most recent data for Argentina are from 2000 because after 2000, Argentina's Ministry of Health changed to publishing births as mother living with a partner or not (including married or cohabiting) rather than as marital and nonmarital.) The percentage of births outside marriage has increased throughout Latin America during the past decades, and there is also a relation to place of residence: women living in the capital city are more likely to have children outside marriage than those living in other parts of the country. Recent data shows figures for non-marital childbearing to be 74% for Colombia, 69% for Peru, 68% for Chile, 66% for Brazil and 55% for Mexico.

=== Asia ===
==== Nepal ====
In Nepal, living together is socially acceptable only after marriage. However, cohabitation is an emerging trend in urban areas of Nepal. Reports have shown that there may be significant number of unmarried couples cohabiting in cities, especially in the capital, Kathmandu. Even when unmarried couples cohabit they either prefer to remain anonymous or pose themselves as a married couple. Cohabitation is not recognized by the law of Nepal and there is no special provision to secure the right of cohabitants in Nepalese law.

==== Bangladesh ====
In Bangladesh, there are no laws prohibiting cohabitation but it is still socially unacceptable. However, cohabitation is becoming more common in urban areas due to western influence. An unmarried couple may feel immense pressure to marry by their family, and will probably choose to live as if they were married and, if exposed, can be expelled from housing or university. Cohabitation has become tolerant in recent years, especially among youths.

==== China ====
In China, cohabitation has become popular among young adults. One study shows that the cohabitation rate before first marriage was over 20% for those born after 1977. Another recent study shows that cohabitation increases the divorce likelihood for those married in the early-reform period, but premarital cohabitation has no effect on divorce for those married in the late-reform period in China.

==== India ====
Cohabitation in India had been historically a taboo in traditional Hindu and Muslim societies. However, recently, this is more acceptable and relatively frequent in the middle and upper classes in the major cities and other urban areas, but is not as common in rural areas and smaller rural towns which are more social conservative. Legally recognised as Live-in relationships, they have been legal in India ever since independence. Recent Indian court rulings have ascribed some rights to long-term cohabiting partners. Female live-in partners have protection rights under Protection of Women from Domestic Violence Act 2005 subject to following conditions as laid by Honourable Supreme Court of India in case of D. Velusamy v D. Patchaiammal:

1. The couple must hold themselves out to society as being akin to spouses.
2. They must be of legal age to marry.
3. They must be otherwise qualified to enter into a legal marriage, including being unmarried.
4. They must have voluntarily cohabited and held themselves out to the world as being akin to spouses for a significant period of time.

On 12 June 2020, the Uttarakhand High Court reiterated in the case of Madhu Bala v. State of Uttarakhand and others (Habeas Corpus Petition No. 8 of 2020) that consensual cohabitation between two adults of the same-sex is legal and akin to an opposite sex relationship.

==== Indonesia ====
In Indonesia, an Islamic penal code proposed in 2005 would have made cohabitation punishable by up to two years in prison, but failed to pass. The practice is still frowned upon, and many low-end hotels and boarding houses have been raided by police for allowing unmarried couples to share a room.

==== Japan ====
In Japan, according to M. Iwasawa at the National Institute of Population and Social Security Research, less than 3% of females between 25 and 29 are currently cohabiting, but more than one in five have had some experience of an unmarried partnership, including cohabitation. A more recent Iwasawa study has shown that there has been a recent emergence of non-marital cohabitation. Couples born in the 1950s cohort showed an incidence of cohabitation of 11.8%, where the 1960s and 1970s cohorts showed cohabitation rates of 30%, and 53.9% respectively. The split between urban and rural residence for people who had cohabited is indicates 68.8% were urban and 31.2% were rural.

==== Philippines ====
In the Philippines, around 2.4 million Filipinos were cohabiting as of 2004. The 2000 census placed the percentage of cohabiting couples at 19%. The majority of individuals are between the ages of 20–24. Poverty was often the main factor in decision to cohabit.

==== Iran ====
In Iran, the cohabitation of two people is known as 'white marriage'. According to researchers, the number of white marriages in Iranian metropolises is increasing.

Under Iranian law, which is based on Islamic Sharia law, the cohabitation of a man and a woman outside the framework of official marriage is a crime.

It is estimated that the duration of a cohabitation in Iran is between one and three years.

Cohabitation has no place in Iran from traditional social, legal and religious points of view. However, cohabitation in Iran can be explained by considering recent cultural changes in Iranian society, including the growth of individualism, modernity, and fluid relationships, and the gaps and conflicts between values.

Various factors such as economic crises and cultural and social changes in cities are reasons for the increase in the number of cohabitation in Iran. In other words, the emergence of capitalism, the increase of job insecurity, the emergence of moral liberalism, the revision of cultural traditions, the anonymity of people in cities, the elimination of the concepts and functions of neighborhoods, changes in family structures and the emergence of temporary relationships are among the major reasons for white marriage in Iran.

New research published by social anthropologist Kameel Ahmady and his team under the title House with Open Door: A Comprehensive Research Study on White Marriage (Cohabitation) in Iran reveals the previously concealed and multi-dimensional aspects of this phenomenon at the macro level, focusing on the Tehran, Mashhad and Isfahan metropolitan areas. The research pieces argues that this phenomenon is more prevalent among educated and post-graduate young people who have migrated to metropolitan areas for work and education.

=== Europe ===
In the European Union, cohabitation is very common. In 2014, 42% of all births in the 28 EU countries were nonmarital. In the following European countries the majority of births occur outside marriage: Iceland (69.9% in 2016), France (59.7% in 2016), Bulgaria (58.6% in 2016), Slovenia (58.6% in 2016), Norway (56.2% in 2016), Estonia (56.1% in 2016), Sweden (54.9% in 2016), Denmark (54% in 2016), Portugal (52.8% in 2016), and the Netherlands (50.4% in 2016).

While couples of all ages cohabit, the phenomenon is much more common among younger people. In late 2005, 21% of families in Finland consisted of cohabiting couples (all age groups). Of couples with children, 18% were cohabiting. Of ages 18 and above in 2003, 13.4% were cohabiting. Generally, cohabitation amongst Finns is most common for people under 30. Legal obstacles for cohabitation were removed in 1926 in a reform of the Criminal Code, while the phenomenon was socially accepted much later on. In France, 17.5% of couples were cohabiting as of 1999.

==== United Kingdom ====
In the United Kingdom today, more than half of babies are born to people who are not married (roughly 51% as of 2021).

The Victorian era of the late 19th century is famous for the Victorian standards of personal morality. Historians generally agree that the middle classes held high personal moral standards and rejected cohabitation. They have debated whether the working classes followed suit. Moralists in the late 19th century such as Henry Mayhew decried high levels of cohabitation without marriage and illegitimate births in London slums. However new research using computerized matching of data files shows that the rates of cohabitation were quite low—under 5% – for the working class and the urban poor.

Falling marriage rates and increased births outside marriage have become a political issue, with questions of whether the government should promote marriage or focus on the status of a parent rather than a spouse; the Conservative Party support the former whilst Labour Party and the Liberal Democrats support the latter. There are also differences between England and Wales and Scotland, with the latter being more accepting of cohabitation.

==== Bulgaria ====
In Bulgaria, there has been a rapid increase in cohabitation after the fall of Communism. The transition from communism to market economy had a great impact on the demographic behavior of the population. After the fall of Communism, the legal and social pressure to get married has declined, and the population has started to experience new life styles. As of 2014, 58.8% of children were born to unmarried mothers.

==== Czech Republic ====
The marriage rates in Czech Republic have fallen dramatically during the past decades. In the 1970s to 1980s, about 96–97% of women married; in 2000 it was estimated that only 75% of women would ever marry. The age at first marriage for women has increased from being in the range of 21.4–21.8 years in the 1970s and 1980s, to being 29.6 in 2011. In the early 1990s, predictions were made by some Czech demographers that cohabitation would increase during the next decades; and indeed, there has been a marked increase in the number of people who live in non-marital couple relations. In 2016, 48.6% of births were to unmarried women.

==== Germany ====
Until the 1980s, it was illegal for unmarried couples to cohabitate, which made it impossible for many same-sex couples to live together. At this point the Bundesgerichtshof ruled that cohabitation could not be banned as it was protected by the Basic Law. As in other western societies, patterns of family life have been changing in Germany during the past decades. This has not created a moral panic, but has been seen more as an ongoing social evolution. Cohabitation, divorce rates, lone parents, and people's reluctance to marry or to have children have increased. However, with regards to family formation and long term cohabitation instead of marriage, there are very strong differences between the regions of former West Germany and East Germany (which was formally Communist). Significantly more children are born out of wedlock in eastern Germany than in western Germany. In 2012, in eastern Germany 61.6% of births were to unmarried women, while in western Germany only 28.4% were. A longitudinal survey found that union stability was significantly higher for cohabiting mothers in eastern Germany than western Germany, due to differences in German society.

==== Greece ====
In Greece, family dynamics remain conservative. The principal form of partnership is marriage, and extramarital childbearing and long term cohabitation are not widespread. For instance, in 2016 only 9.4% of births were outside marriage, which is the lowest percentage among the European Union member states. Religion in Greece plays a very important role in society; it was only in 1983 that civil marriage was introduced in the country. The new laws modernized family law, abolished dowry, and provided for equal rights for "illegitimate" children. According to a 2008 study: "Greek society still remains conservative and birthing outside marriage, although protected by law, remains in many ways socially unacceptable." Despite this, there have been further legal changes providing for a modern "western" outlook on family life, including Law 3719/2008 dealing with family issues, including Article 14 of the law, which reduced the separation period (necessary before a divorce in certain circumstances) from four years to two years.

==== Hungary ====
The literature on second demographic transition argues as well that highly educated women are more prone to engage in cohabitation, although the reasons are different: they are less concerned with respecting the societal norms. Some scholars argued that cohabitation is very similar to being single in the sense of not giving up independence and personal autonomy.

In Hungary, cohabitation was an uncommon phenomenon until the late 1980s and it was largely confined to the divorced or widowed individuals. Among the ethnic groups, Gypsy/Roma tended to have higher rates of cohabitation, mainly due to their reluctance to register their marriages officially. Since the 1980s, cohabitation became much more frequent among all ethnic groups and it has been argued to have strongly influenced the decline in fertility. In 2015, 47.9% of births were to unmarried women.

==== Ireland ====
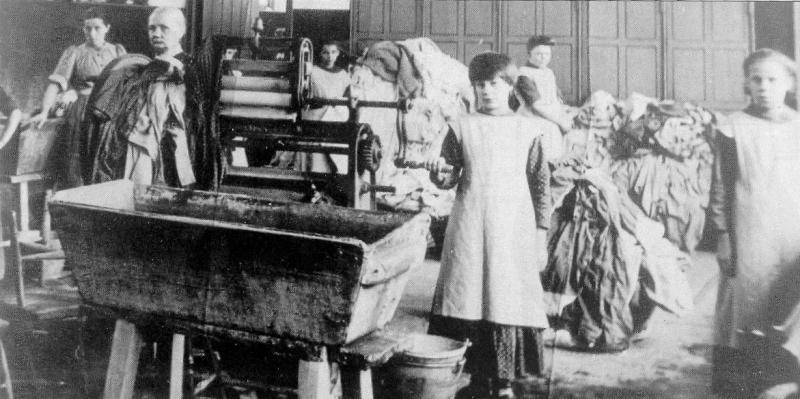
Irish Magdalene Laundry, c. early 1900s. Women who had sexual relations outside marriage were often sent to Magdalene laundries until the mid-20th century.

Cohabitation in Ireland has increased in recent years, and 36.6% of births were to unmarried women in 2016. Until a few decades ago, women who had children outside marriage were severely stigmatized and often detained in Magdalene laundries. The Civil Partnership and Certain Rights and Obligations of Cohabitants Act 2010 gives some rights to unmarried cohabitants (under this act same-sex couples can enter into civil partnerships, while long term unmarried couples – both heterosexual and same sex – who have not registered their relation have some limited rights and obligations).

==== Italy ====
In Italy, where Roman Catholicism had a historically strong presence, cohabitation is not as common as in other countries of Europe, yet it has increased in recent years. There are significant regional differences, with non-marital unions being more common in Northern Italy than in Southern Italy. A study published in 2006 found that long term cohabitation was still novel to Italy, though more common among young people. As of 2015, the share of births outside marriage was 28.7%, but this varied by statistical regions as follows: Central Italy (33.8%), Northeast Italy (33.1%), Northwest Italy (31.3%), Insular Italy (24.2%), and South Italy (20.3%).

==== The Netherlands ====
Dutch researchers have found that research participants see cohabitation as a risk-reduction strategy in a country with high relationship instability. As of 2016, 50.4% births were to unmarried women.

==== Norway ====
Cohabitation is a common type of partnership in Norway. Cohabitants have some rights if they have joint children, or if they have lived together for five years. Cohabitants can also regulate their relationship through a cohabitation agreement. In Norway, in 2016, 56.2% of children were born outside marriage.

==== Poland ====
In Poland, after the fall of Communism, the influence of religion has increased. Indeed, Poland has one of the most religious populations in Europe (see religion in Europe). Cohabitation in Poland has traditionally been associated with the lower social classes, but in recent years an increase has been seen among the more educated. Family structure in Poland remains traditional: Marriages are contracted at relatively young ages, and the incidence of divorce is relatively low (by European standards). The exact incidence of cohabitation is not well established, but it is quite low compared to other Western countries. However, Poland is not completely 'immune' to Western influence and, in 2016, 25% of children were born outside marriage.

==== Slovakia ====
Slovakia is more conservative and religious than neighboring Czech Republic. The principal form of partnership is marriage, but extramarital childbearing and cohabitation are slowly spreading, yet this trend is not without criticism; and some view these phenomena as a threat to traditional values. In 2016, 40.2% of births were to unmarried women. Fertility in Slovakia has been described in a 2008 study as "between tradition and modernity".

==== Switzerland ====
Switzerland has a tradition of strong conservatism; which can be seen in its legal and social history: in Europe, Switzerland was one of the last countries to establish gender equality in marriage: married women's rights were severely restricted until 1988, when legal reforms providing gender equality in marriage, abolishing the legal authority of the husband, come into force (these reforms had been approved in 1985 by voters in a referendum, who narrowly voted in favor with 54.7% of voters approving). Adultery was decriminalized in 1989. Until the late 20th century, most cantons had regulations banning unmarried cohabitation of couples; the last canton to end such prohibition was Valais, in 1995. As of 2015, 22.5% of births were to unmarried women. Births outside marriage are most common in the French speaking part (highest percentage in the cantons of Vaud, Neuchâtel, Geneva, Jura) and least common in the eastern German speaking cantons (lowest percentage in the cantons of St. Gallen, Zug, Appenzell Innerrhoden, Appenzell Ausserrhoden).

==== Spain ====
Spanish society has undergone major changes since the fall of the Franco regime. Important legal changes which have occurred throughout the 1970s and 1980s include legalization of divorce, decriminalization of adultery, gender equality in family law, and removing the ban on contraception. The liberalization of the political climate has allowed for alternative family formation. In the mid-1990s, cohabitation in Spain was still described as a "marginal" phenomenon, but since the 1990s, cohabitation has increased dramatically in Spain. In Spain, in 2016, 45.9% of births were outside marriage. As in other countries, there are regional differences: in 2011, in Catalonia the figure was 42% – highest in mainland Spain in that year (Canary Islands 59% and Balearic Islands 43.5% were highest) while in Murcia it was only 30.7% (lowest).

==== Russia ====
In Russia, many couples express a desire to cohabit before marriage, then register a civil marriage, and then at a later stage have a large church wedding.

=== Middle East ===
The cohabitation rate in West Asian countries is much lower than in European countries. In some parts of the continent it is however becoming more common for young people. As of 1994, the rate of premarital cohabitation in Israel was 25%.

Cohabitation is illegal according to Sunni sharia law. Cohabitation, Bi'ah, is a legal status, "Yadua BetTzibbur", by the Jews Halakha (Halacha) religious Law.

==== Kuwait ====
Some legal recognition is extended to former common-law unions in Kuwait. Kuwaiti Family law applies the law of the father's, husband's or male partner's country in case of expatriate familial disputes. Hence, if the father's country of nationality recognises common-law marriages (like the United Kingdom), matters such as child support dues and maintenance can be considered in a Kuwaiti court. However, out-of-marriage sexual intercourse is an offence punishable in Kuwait with a prison sentence between 6 months and 6 years if caught in action by an official or an administrative deportation order. This meaning that common-law marriage recognition can only be practically seen in exceptional cases like where the illegitimate child was born aboard and/or former couples who have since expatriated to Kuwait. Single expat parents including expat mothers can legally sponsor their children for residency permits. Couples where one or both parties are Kuwaiti are covered by local family law and hence do not have recourse to the limited recognition of common-law marriage.

==== United Arab Emirates ====
Children born out-of-wedlock are given partial recognition. Their single expat mother or single expat father can sponsor them for residency. However, sexual relations outside of marriage were illegal in the UAE until November 2020, when restrictions were eased.

=== Oceania ===
==== Australia ====
In Australia, 22% of couples were cohabiting as of 2005. 78% of couples who marry have lived together beforehand in 2008, rising from 16% in 1975. In 2013, 34% of all births were to unmarried women. Australia recognizes de facto relationships. The proportion of births outside marriage varies by state/territory, being, in 2009, lowest in Victoria (at 28%), Australian Capital Territory (at 29%), and New South Wales (at 30%); and highest in Northern Territory (at 63%) and Tasmania (at 51%).

==== New Zealand ====
In New Zealand according to the 2001 census, 20.5% of couples were in de facto relationships. In New Zealand, 23.7% of couples were cohabiting as of 2006. In 2010, 48% of births were outside marriage. Like Australia, New Zealand recognizes de facto relationships.

=== Africa ===
==== South Africa ====
In South Africa, the 2011 census revealed that of South Africans aged 20 or older, 43.7% had never been married, 36.7% were married at the time of the census, 11.0% were living together like married partners. Civil marriages fell by 22,5% between 2011 and 2019 and declined by a further 31,1% in 2020.

== In popular culture ==
One example of how cohabitation is referenced in popular culture is in the 1978 novel Prudence by British author Jilly Cooper, where it is used as an example of where American language used to describe relationships - in this case "permanent commitment" - and is mocked in popular culture.

== See also ==
- Alimony
- Coparenting
- Family law
- Fornication
- Fragile Families and Child Wellbeing Study
- Interpersonal relationship and Intimate relationship
  - Domestic partnership
  - Free union
  - Pilegesh
  - Samenlevingscontract
- Living apart together
- Marriage gap
- POSSLQ
