= This Book Is Gay =

Nonfiction book by Juno Dawson

- US second edition cover
- Author: Juno Dawson
- Illustrator: Spike Gerrell
- Language: English
- Subject: LGBTQ literature
- Genre: Nonfiction
- Publisher: Hot Key Books
- Publication date: 4 September 2014
- Publication place: United Kingdom
- Media type: Print, ebook
- ISBN: 978-1-471-40395-8

This Book Is Gay is a nonfiction book written by Juno Dawson and illustrated by Spike Gerrell, first published in the United Kingdom in 2014 with subsequent publication in the US in June 2015. The book is a "manual to all areas of life as an LGBT person" and "is meant to serve as a guidebook for young people discovering their sexual identity and how to navigate those uncomfortable waters."

This Book Is Gay has frequently been banned and challenged in the United States, according to the American Library Association's Office of Intellectual Freedom.

== Background ==
Prior to writing This Book Is Gay, Dawson had worked as a "sexual education and wellness teacher" for seven years. In 2012, when her publisher requested she write This Book Is Gay, she was uncertain about undertaking "such a massive project." However, she wanted to write a book she would have found beneficial to herself as a queer adolescent, as well as a book that could help protect young people in the age of the internet, where misinformation is rampant.

Beyond discussing topics directly related to sexual intercourse, This Book Is Gay covers "the well-being and the relationship and the nurturing side" of sexual relationships, which Dawson states "was really important to [her], so that young queer people can picture a future for themselves as well-adjusted queer adults."

== Book summary ==
Each of the book's thirteen chapters concerns a different aspect of queer life. The book incorporates discussion of sex education, queer stereotypes, queer history, and many other topics. The introduction is by David Levithan. The chapters are as follows:

=== Chapter 1: Welcome to the Members Club ===
This chapter opens with the statement of "There's a long-running joke that, on 'coming out' a young lesbian, gay guy, bisexual, or trans person should receive a membership card and instruction manual. This is that instruction manual." This serves as a general introduction to why this book may be needed. It encompasses the inclusion of different identities, as well as discusses statistics about how many queer people live in the United States, comparing that number to other well-known statistics.

=== Chapter 2: The Name Game ===
This chapter outlines basic queer identities, and gives definitions for each one. Some of the identities also come with testimonials from people who identify with those labels.

=== Chapter 3: You Can't Mistake Our Biology ===
This chapter opens with discussion about the scientific studies performed and general scientific reasoning for the existence of gay people.

=== Chapter 4: Stereotypes are Poo ===
This chapter deals with a few of the stereotypes associated with the queer community. It lists a few common stereotypes, and disproves them both through theoretical examples and through testimony from queer people who submitted blurbs to the book. Then it goes on to talk about different labels within the queer community (bear, twink, butch, etc), as well as different aspects of queer culture, and how while there are some aspects that are true and important to queer culture, they are also stereotypes or the result of attempting to offset stereotypes. The chapter ends with encouraging people to just be themselves, regardless of whether or not they are conforming to stereotypes.

=== Chapter 5: The Fear ===
This chapter focused on homophobia, and how it makes being queer difficult for many people. It distinguishes between homophobia and transphobia on an individual level from the same kind of discrimination on an institutional level. It has a section focusing on HIV/AIDS, and its impact on the gay community. It gives people tools to push back against queerphobic language or policies, as well as help in identifying them.

=== Chapter 6: Haterz Gon’ Hate ===
This chapter focuses on the perspective of different cultures & religions, and their views on being queer. It provides a list of countries that have laws against same-sex sex between two men or two women, as well as countries that have similar or ambiguous laws. The list was up to date as of 2015. It also provides some charities people can donate to in order to help people in those countries and make it all more safe. It then looks at different religions, and takes their religious texts to demonstrate what their opinions of being queer may be, and then provides arguments against them, using those same source texts.

=== Chapter 7: Coming Out ===
This chapter focuses on the action of publicly or privately allowing your identity to be known, and discusses the benefits and drawbacks of coming out. It also gives step by step advice to people who want to come out, and includes some details about the difference between coming out relating to your sexuality vs coming out relating to your gender identity.

=== Chapter 8: Where to Meet People Like You ===
This chapter talks about concepts like gaydar, safe spaces (specifically the gay scene and what that might look like). It also talks about dating, and different places or ways to meet people, including Grindr and other dating apps.

=== Chapter 9: The Ins and Outs of Gay Sex ===
This chapter serves as a comprehensive sex-ed piece, focusing both on safe sex but also the mechanics of sex between same-sex couples. It also has a portion discussing STIs, teaching people how to identify them and how they are spread, including a specific section on HIV.

=== Chapter 10: Nesting ===
Discussion of relationship commitments, both monogamous and polyamorous. It also discusses the different ways that same-sex couples can have children, such as through adoption, sperm donation, surrogacy, or other options.

=== Chapter 11: Hats ===
This chapter focuses on intersectionality and how being queer is not the only aspect of your identity.

=== Chapter 12: A Guide to Recognizing Your Gay Saints ===
This chapter provides an alphabetical list of ‘gay icons’, and then also reminds people of the importance of boycotting and/or blacklisting queerphobic people/companies.

=== Build A Bridge: Guidance for Parents and Carers of LGBT* Youth ===
This chapter is designed for the adults and role models in a queer child’s life.

=== The Cheat Sheet ===
List of Important queer terms and concepts, as seen throughout the book.

=== Helpful Numbers and Websites ===
Resource sheet for queer people

== Reception ==
=== Reviews ===
Booklist's Michael Cart offered This Book Is Gay a starred review, calling it "witty and wise and so packed with information it’s hard to imagine a reader who won’t learn something new." Cart highlighted how the book is "often breezy in tone but always informative."

Publishers Weekly called it "irreverent" and "informative", with "a humorous tone that should help set anxious readers at ease." They also commented on the illustrations, saying, "Gerrell’s playful b&w cartoons help maintain an encouraging atmosphere, even when Dawson turns to homophobia/transphobia, anti-gay legislation, and STDs."

In a mixed review, Kirkus Reviews noted that This Book Is Gay is "important for its frank sex talk but far less inclusive than it aims to be." They explained by stating that many chapters "are helpfully matter-of-fact" and readers hear from a variety of perspectives. However, "the book’s efforts to support transgender readers are undermined by persistent, thoughtless affirmations that biology really is destiny—for instance, when the author debunks the myth that 'gay men are ‘girls’ ” with a jokey 'Penis? Check! Yup, gay men are, in fact, male.'"

=== Accolades ===
Booklist included This Book Is Gay on their 2015 "Top 10 LGBTQ for Youth" list, and it was a 2015 Booklist Editors' Choice: Books for Youth selection.

=== Controversy and censorship ===
==== United States ====
This Book Is Gay has faced controversy since its publication in the United States. In order to provide access to digital books to all teens and young adults in the US, the Brooklyn Public Library and Seattle Public Library unveiled a nationwide lending program called Books Unbanned. The controversy stems from the book's sex education content, such as mentioning the dating app Grindr, as well as oral and anal sex diagrams.

In November of 2015, residents of Wasilla, Alaska, petitioned to remove the book from a public library, with a number of residents objecting to profanity and sexually explicit content. The following year, all nonfiction books in the young adult section of the Wasilla library were moved to the adult section due to parents' complaints about the book, and "the library director was branded as a pedophile in the highly controversial public debates ... for defending the sex education book for teens." Dawson responded by saying the event highlighted how "there is still such small-mindedness and hatred left to contend with."

In 2022, it tied for the tenth-most banned and challenged books in the United States that year, according to the American Library Association's Office for Intellectual Freedom, with challenges coming from numerous school districts. Vanderbilt University named it the ninth-most banned book in the country.

In June, after a librarian in Campbell County, Wyoming, shared books with LGBT+ themes for Pride Month, local residents "voiced their objections led by County Commissioner Del Shelstad who stated 'This is exactly the type of thing that I think is harmful in our community. I’m not asking you to have a straight Pride Month, I'm just asking you not to have a gay Pride month.'" The librarian's decision led to conversations in the community that included suggestions to remove all books with LGBT themes from the library — even books intended for adult readers. When library board members were asked about whether the book was appropriate for local youth, most refused to answer the question, stating they had not reviewed the book. This Book Is Gay was the first book to be challenged in the community in several years but led to the library reconsidering the shelving of twelve books, including This Book Is Gay, as well as The Babysitters Coven by Kate Williams and Heartstopper by Alice Oseman.

In August, This Book Is Gay was listed among 52 books banned by the Alpine School District following the implementation of Utah law H.B. 374, "Sensitive Materials In Schools".

Additionally, along with Queer: A Graphic History by Meg-John Barker, the book was specifically targeted for review in the Elmbrook School District. Further, a parent at the North Hunterdon-Voorhees Regional High School District read sections of This Book Is Gay, as well as five other LGBT+ books, and "called for audits, and threatened criminal charges for those responsible for providing 'evil, wicked' content in the school. The school board voted to retain all five challenged LGBTQIA+ titles."

In 2023, This Book is Gay became the third-most banned and challenged book in the United States that year, according to the American Library Association's Office for Intellectual Freedom.

That year, parents in Hilliard, Ohio, met to discuss whether This Book Is Gay should be removed from the school library, claiming "it goes too far when discussing intimacy". However, some parents noted the school "the district needs to make LGBTQ students feel safe." Ultimately, parents were reminded that if they were "uncomfortable with their child reading [specific books]", they should "inform the library, where their student can be prohibited from checking the book out". Shortly after, the Hillsborough County, Florida school district banned the book from middle school libraries, and the Sioux City Community School District removed it from their high school after Libs of TikTok referred to the book as pornographic. This Book Is Gay was also mentioned in one of two hoax bomb threats that were "part of a series of automated overseas emails" and sent to Hilton Central School District. The school's superintendent stated, "Students of the district that belong to that community that they are welcome here at Hilton Central School District as students within our public schools... We love them as we love our other students. We are absolutely sorry that a debate around a piece of literature is making them feel as if they are not included or welcome."

Fremont, Nebraska, in 2023 voted to keep the book on the shelves, with city council president Mark Jensen stating "If I didn't want to read a book about suspension bridges, I wouldn't go pick up a book that said this book is about suspension bridges and read it. A public library has to have content for everybody, not just me. That was to service the entirety of the community". After a 3–2 vote, the book stayed on the shelves of the local library.

Dawson has commented responding to the book's ongoing censorship. In an interview with Rolling Stone in April 2023, she explained that it is "not surprising" her book has frequently been targeted, though it is "disappointing". "We're all very clear This Book is Gay is not for children," she said, before opining that "if we really wanted to keep kids in the United States safe, we wouldn't be talking about books. We would be talking about guns".

==== United Kingdom ====
The Guardian reported that school librarians were being asked to remove This Book is Gay from bookshelves. The article speculated that UK bans may have been influenced by censorship of the book in the US. "We've seen a couple of cases where things have been stirred up or initiated by groups of people in America - it's no one actually in the school community itself," said the chief executive of the School Library Association.

== Translations ==
Polish translation by Dominika Dymińska was released in 2016.
