= Prudence (novel) =

1978 novel by Jilly Cooper

- Author: Jilly Cooper
- Language: English
- Genre: Romance
- Publication date: 1978
- Publication place: England
- Preceded by: Octavia
- Followed by: Imogen
- Website: https://www.jillycooper.co.uk/books/prudence/

Prudence: a comedy of Eros is a 1978 romance novel by English author Jilly Cooper. Set in the Lake District, the plot evolves around the love lives of the Mulholland brothers and how they intersect with the life of the eponymous Prudence. Based on an earlier short story by Cooper, the Toronto Star reviewed the novel as "a light escapist read". The novel was adapted for radio in 1979 by Capital Radio, starring Felicity Kendal.

== Plot ==
Prudence falls in love with a barrister named Pendle, and after several months he invites her to meet his family, including both Mulholland brothers, Ace and Jack. Jack runs the family textile business nearby, whilst Ace is a television producer just returned from America. However, Jack's wife Maggie used to go out with Pendle, and Pendle is still in love with her. Ace's partner Berenice also arrives from America to complete the party. Over the weekend Jack kisses Prudence to make Maggie jealous, but they are caught by Ace. Prudence falls sick and is nursed by Ace, whilst Pendle and Maggie run away together to London. After Prudence recovers from her sickness, Berenice tells Prudence that she and Ace will marry. By this time Prudence has realised she's fallen in love with Ace, so she retreats to London. Ace follows her, declares his love and proposes.

== Characters ==
- Prudence
- Pendle
- Jack
- Ace
- Maggie
- Berenice

== Background ==
The novel is set in the Lake District and is the fifth novel in Jilly Cooper's romance series. It is based on Cooper's short story House of Cards, which was first published in the magazine 19.

== Reception ==
Upon publication in 1978 The Burton Observer and Chronicle described how Cooper's "delightful turn of phrase" made the book "enjoyable to read". In contrast Michael Ungar reviewed the novel for The Daily Post and described his disappointment in both the novel and the writer, stating that he expected something more mature from Cooper. He also cited poor characterisation meant that what should have been a "satirical romp" was hopefully the final book in the series. In response Cooper's publisher wrote to the paper announcing that the next novel, Imogen, was due that same year and it too was likely to be enjoyed by 100,000s of readers. Nevertheless Cooper's husband read the novel when he was ill and reportedly said that "it made him feel worse". In 1980 the Toronto Star reviewed the novel as "a light escapist read", but stated that it did require readers to understand some aspects of British culture, including the colours of the monopoly board.

In 2005 Sarah Webb, writing for the Irish Independent, described how this novel and others in the romance series inspired a life-long love for romance novels. Sarra Manning, writing for Red magazine in 2018 described how as a young woman she wanted to be "scatty and adorable" like Prudence and the eponymous lead of the novel Imogen. In 2019 the same publication listed Prudence as one of it top literary characters to have sex with, above Cooper's anti-hero Rupert Campbell-Black. The article described how Prudence was "a Cool Girl (long before Gone Girl came out), also a serial shagger and very fond of wearing dungarees with nothing on underneath". This is in contrast to Jane McLoughlin's 2009 analysis of Prudence (and also Emily, the titular heroine of another Cooper romance) as "unsophisticated ugly ducklings". In 2023 Irish journalist Emily Hourican stated she'd choose Prudence and the other novels in Cooper's romance series as her specialist subject on Mastermind. The following year food writer Kate Young used the sausage rolls cooked by Prudence for a birthday party in the novel as recipe inspiration.

== Adaptation ==
The novel was adapted for radio in 1979 by Capital Radio, starring Felicity Kendal as Prudence, alongside Nigel Davenport and Gerald Harper. It was serialised in ten 15 minute episodes.

== Analysis ==
The novel is cited as an example in a cultural analysis of cohabitation in the 1970s. It is chosen as an example of where American language used to describe relationships - in this case "permanent commitment" - and is mocked in popular culture. In 2017 in her book The Gender Games, Bradford-born writer Juno Dawson described how her obsession with the "ultra-glam" covers of novels like Prudence as a child gave her a sense that they "weren't very good at being a boy".
