= Fremont, Nebraska =

- City
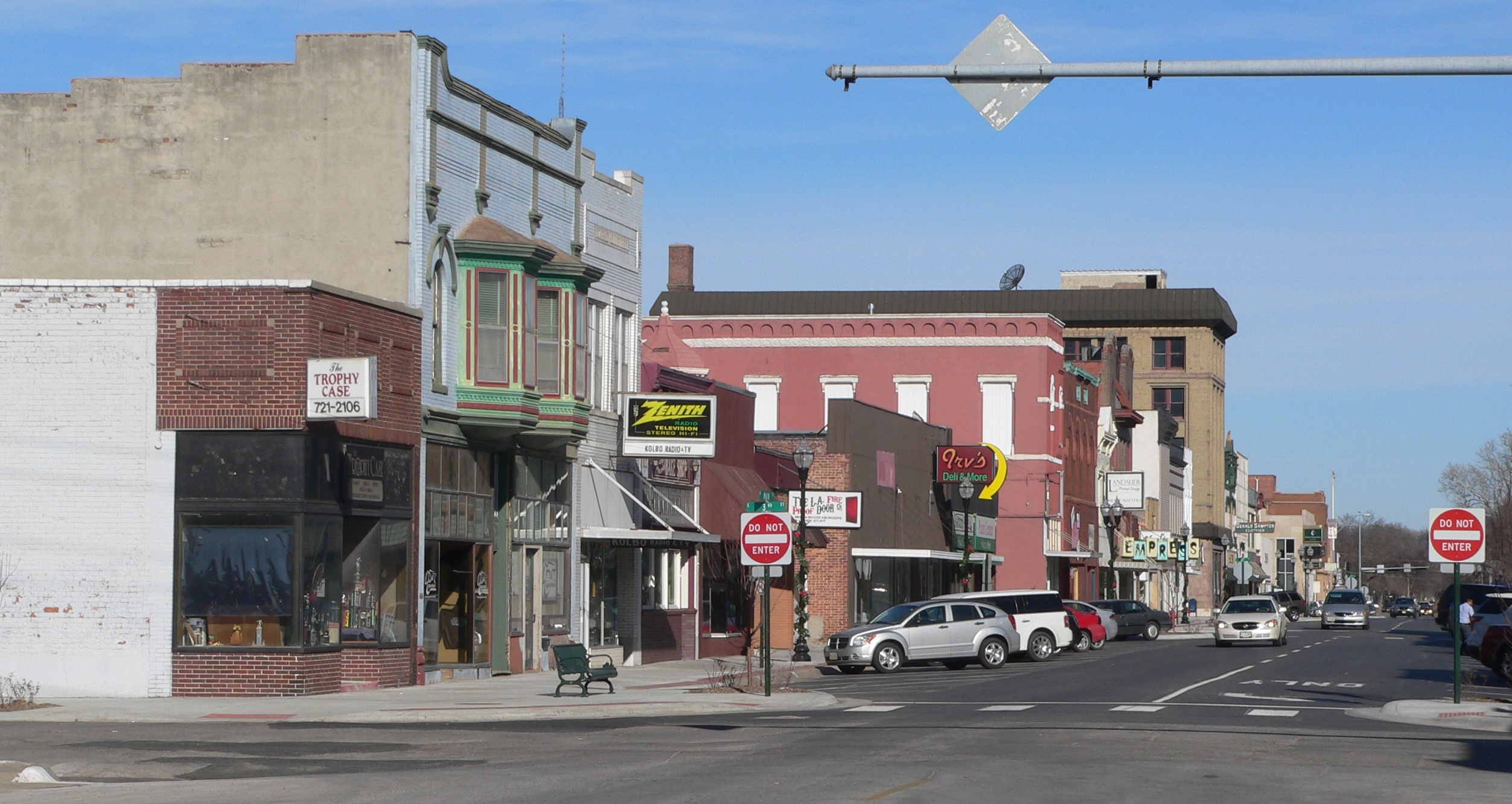
- Fremont's historic downtown is listed in the National Register of Historic Places.

- Seal Logo
- Nicknames: FMT, The Mont
- Location in Nebraska
- Coordinates: 41°26′22″N 96°29′14″W
- Country: United States
- State: Nebraska
- County: Dodge
- Founded: 1856
- Incorporated: June 17, 1871

Government
  - Mayor: Dev Sookram

Area
  - Total: 10.86 sq mi (28.12 km^{2})
  - Land: 10.80 sq mi (27.96 km^{2})
  - Water: 0.062 sq mi (0.16 km^{2})
- Elevation: 1,188 ft (362 m)

Population (2020)
  - Total: 27,141
  - Density: 2,514.2/sq mi (970.75/km^{2})
- Time zone: UTC−6 (CST)
  - Summer (DST): UTC−5 (CDT)
- ZIP codes: 68025-68026
- Area code: 402
- FIPS code: 31-17670
- GNIS feature ID: 838010
- Website: fremontne.gov

Fremont is a city in and the county seat of Dodge County in the eastern portion of the state of Nebraska in the Midwestern United States. The population was 27,141 at the 2020 census, making it the sixth most populous city in Nebraska. Fremont is the home of Midland University.

== History ==
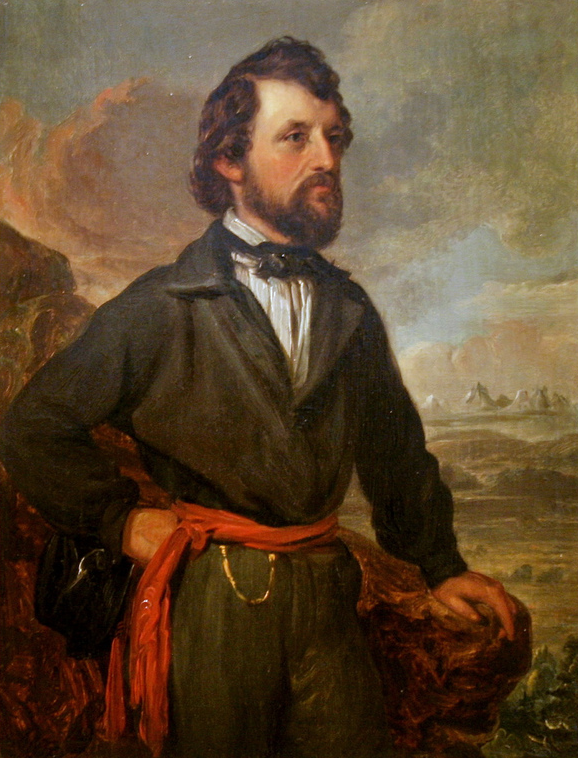
John C. Fremont is the city's namesake.

From the 1830s to the 1860s, the area saw a great deal of traffic due to the Mormon Trail, which passed along the north bank of the Platte River. A ferry connected the two banks of the Elkhorn River near Fremont. It was a major overland route for emigrant settlers going to the West, the military and hunters.

Fremont was laid out in 1856 in anticipation that the railroad would be extended to that site. It was named after the American explorer, politician and military official General John C. Frémont. By 1857, there were 13 log houses in the town. The Union Pacific Railroad reached the town in December 1865 becoming the first railroad into the future rail hub. Sioux City and Pacific Railroad completed track into the town in 1868 with the Elkhorn Valley Railroad arriving in 1869.

Due to the town's geographically central location, the First Transcontinental Telegraph line (1861), railroad (1865) and highway (1913) passed through or very near Fremont. Original brick portions of the "Old Lincoln Highway" are located east of Fremont, on the way to Omaha.

Fremont, Nebraska, is the namesake for the Fremont neighborhood in Seattle, which was settled by Luther H. Griffith and Edward Blewett both from Fremont, NE.

On January 10, 1976, in downtown Fremont, the Pathfinder Hotel exploded due to a natural gas leak in the basement. At the time the hotel was being used as apartments, mostly occupied by senior citizens. It also was a meeting place for philanthropic and business organizations, and had a drug store on the northwest corner. The explosion shattered windows around the city, and the ensuing fire killed 20 people and destroyed most of the city block of the hotel.

Fremont gained national attention in 2010 when residents approved a referendum that would ban illegal immigrants from renting and working in the town.

In 2023 the city council and the board of the Keene Memorial Library voted to remove books on LGBT topics, including This Book Is Gay, from the young adult section of the library to the adult section. A group of Fremont citizens attempted to have the book removed entirety, but failed.

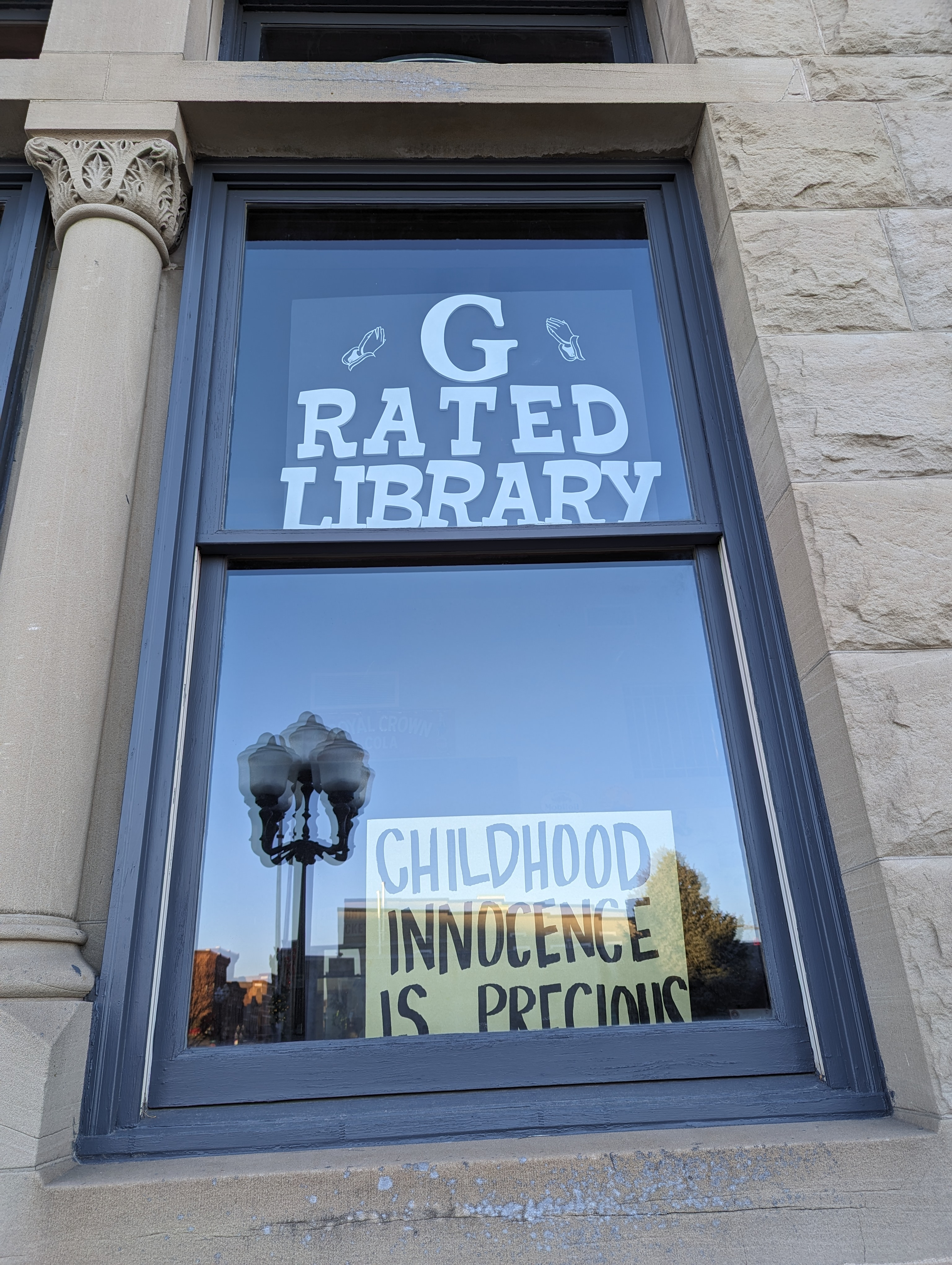
Signs placed in the library window during a controversy regarding LGBT-themed titles in the Young Adult section

On July 29, 2025, a biofuels plant in south Fremont exploded, killing a man and two children and shaking houses at least a half mile away from the building. The explosion was likely caused by an accidental dust fire.

== Geography ==
Fremont is located along the Platte River, about 35 miles (56 km) northwest of the largest city in the area, Omaha, and 50 miles (80 km) northeast of the state capitol, Lincoln.

According to the United States Census Bureau, the city has a total area of 8.85 square miles (22.92 km^{2}), of which 8.80 square miles (22.79 km^{2}) is land and 0.05 square miles (0.13 km^{2}) is water. Fremont lies in the river plain between the Platte and Elkhorn rivers, at an elevation of about 1,203 feet (367 m).

=== Climate ===
Climate data for Fremont, Nebraska (1991–2020, extremes 1893–present)
Month	Jan	Feb	Mar	Apr	May	Jun	Jul	Aug	Sep	Oct	Nov	Dec	Year
Record high °F (°C)	72 (22)	77 (25)	90 (32)	98 (37)	106 (41)	108 (42)	116 (47)	115 (46)	107 (42)	96 (36)	85 (29)	73 (23)	116 (47)
Mean maximum °F (°C)	56.6 (13.7)	62.0 (16.7)	76.0 (24.4)	85.7 (29.8)	92.3 (33.5)	96.0 (35.6)	97.9 (36.6)	95.8 (35.4)	92.8 (33.8)	86.0 (30.0)	72.4 (22.4)	58.5 (14.7)	99.2 (37.3)
Mean daily maximum °F (°C)	32.4 (0.2)	37.1 (2.8)	50.1 (10.1)	62.8 (17.1)	73.4 (23.0)	83.3 (28.5)	86.7 (30.4)	84.5 (29.2)	78.1 (25.6)	65.0 (18.3)	49.5 (9.7)	36.3 (2.4)	61.6 (16.4)
Daily mean °F (°C)	22.6 (−5.2)	26.9 (−2.8)	38.6 (3.7)	50.5 (10.3)	61.8 (16.6)	72.2 (22.3)	75.9 (24.4)	73.5 (23.1)	65.6 (18.7)	52.7 (11.5)	38.5 (3.6)	27.0 (−2.8)	50.5 (10.3)
Mean daily minimum °F (°C)	12.8 (−10.7)	16.7 (−8.5)	27.2 (−2.7)	38.1 (3.4)	50.2 (10.1)	61.0 (16.1)	65.1 (18.4)	62.5 (16.9)	53.1 (11.7)	40.4 (4.7)	27.5 (−2.5)	17.7 (−7.9)	39.4 (4.1)
Mean minimum °F (°C)	−7.1 (−21.7)	−2.1 (−18.9)	7.5 (−13.6)	23.9 (−4.5)	36.3 (2.4)	49.5 (9.7)	55.0 (12.8)	52.6 (11.4)	38.5 (3.6)	24.2 (−4.3)	11.1 (−11.6)	−1.8 (−18.8)	−10.4 (−23.6)
Record low °F (°C)	−31 (−35)	−31 (−35)	−16 (−27)	3 (−16)	22 (−6)	38 (3)	40 (4)	38 (3)	24 (−4)	5 (−15)	−13 (−25)	−30 (−34)	−31 (−35)
Average precipitation inches (mm)	0.76 (19)	0.92 (23)	1.57 (40)	3.02 (77)	4.55 (116)	4.95 (126)	3.21 (82)	3.68 (93)	3.09 (78)	2.23 (57)	1.22 (31)	1.19 (30)	30.39 (772)
Average snowfall inches (cm)	7.1 (18)	8.5 (22)	4.3 (11)	1.6 (4.1)	0.0 (0.0)	0.0 (0.0)	0.0 (0.0)	0.0 (0.0)	0.0 (0.0)	0.6 (1.5)	1.7 (4.3)	6.0 (15)	29.8 (75.9)
Average precipitation days (≥ 0.01 in)	5.6	5.8	6.8	8.9	12.0	10.6	9.4	9.3	7.2	7.1	5.0	5.5	93.2
Average snowy days (≥ 0.1 in)	4.4	4.3	2.0	0.6	0.0	0.0	0.0	0.0	0.0	0.3	1.2	3.4	16.2
Source: NOAA

== Demographics ==
Historical population
Census	Pop.	Note	%±
1870	1,195		—
1880	3,013		152.1%
1890	6,747		123.9%
1900	7,241		7.3%
1910	8,718		20.4%
1920	9,592		10.0%
1930	11,407		18.9%
1940	11,862		4.0%
1950	14,762		24.4%
1960	19,698		33.4%
1970	22,962		16.6%
1980	23,979		4.4%
1990	23,680		−1.2%
2000	25,174		6.3%
2010	26,397		4.9%
2020	27,141		2.8%
2023 (est.)	27,602		1.7%
U.S. Decennial Census

Fremont is the county seat of Dodge County, Nebraska, and is likewise the financial and social center of the area. Facilitated by the completion of the US Highway 275 and Highway 30 bypass around Fremont, from Omaha, eastern Fremont is growing rapidly as a bedroom community for Omaha.

=== 2020 census ===
As of the 2020 census, Fremont had a population of 27,141 with 10,702 households and 6,845 families. The population density was 2,515.4 per square mile (970.7/km^{2}).

24.9% of residents were under the age of 18, 10.0% were from 18 to 24, 22.9% were from 25 to 44, 23.1% were from 45 to 64, and 17.9% were 65 years of age or older. The median age was 36.8 years. For every 100 females there were 96.1 males, and for every 100 females age 18 and over there were 95.3 males age 18 and over.

Of the 10,702 households, 31.9% had children under the age of 18 living in them. Of all households, 44.9% were married-couple households, 19.1% were households with a male householder and no spouse or partner present, and 27.5% were households with a female householder and no spouse or partner present. About 29.4% of all households were made up of individuals and 13.7% had someone living alone who was 65 years of age or older. The average household size was 2.3 and the average family size was 2.9.

There were 11,398 housing units, of which 6.1% were vacant. The homeowner vacancy rate was 1.1% and the rental vacancy rate was 5.7%. 99.5% of residents lived in urban areas, while 0.5% lived in rural areas.

Racial composition as of the 2020 census
Race	Number	Percent
White	21,486	79.2%
Black or African American	212	0.8%
American Indian and Alaska Native	311	1.1%
Asian	176	0.6%
Native Hawaiian and Other Pacific Islander	14	0.1%
Some other race	2,692	9.9%
Two or more races	2,250	8.3%
Hispanic or Latino (of any race)	5,220	19.2%

=== 2016–2020 American Community Survey ===
The 2016–2020 5-year American Community Survey estimates show that the median household income was $54,291 (with a margin of error of +/- $3,384) and the median family income $72,318 (+/- $2,903). Males had a median income of $41,392 (+/- $1,621) versus $26,350 (+/- $1,415) for females. The median income for those above 16 years old was $33,649 (+/- $2,465). Approximately, 7.1% of families and 12.3% of the population were below the poverty line, including 15.0% of those under the age of 18 and 11.7% of those ages 65 or over.

=== 2010 census ===
As of the census of 2010, there were 26,397 people, 10,725 households, and 6,862 families living in the city. The population density was 2,999.7 inhabitants per square mile (1,158.2/km^{2}). There were 11,427 housing units at an average density of 1,298.5 per square mile (501.4/km^{2}). The racial makeup of the city was 89.2% White, 0.7% African American, 0.6% Native American, 0.6% Asian, 0.3% Pacific Islander, 7.1% from other races, and 1.6% from two or more races. Hispanic or Latino of any race were 11.9% of the population.

There were 10,725 households, of which 31.6% had children under the age of 18 living with them, 47.8% were married couples living together, 11.2% had a female householder with no husband present, 4.9% had a male householder with no wife present, and 36.0% were non-families. 30.2% of all households were made up of individuals, and 13.4% had someone living alone who was 65 years of age or older. The average household size was 2.38 and the average family size was 2.94.

The median age in the city was 38 years. 24.2% of residents were under the age of 18; 9.9% were between the ages of 18 and 24; 23.9% were from 25 to 44; 24.7% were from 45 to 64; and 17.3% were 65 years of age or older. The gender makeup of the city was 48.5% male and 51.5% female.

=== 2000 census ===
As of the census of 2000, there were 25,174 people, 10,171 households, and 6,672 families living in the city, which makes it the 6th largest city in Nebraska. The population density was 3,393.3 inhabitants per square mile (1,310.2/km^{2}). There were 10,576 housing units at an average density of 1,425.6 per square mile (550.4/km^{2}). The racial makeup of the city was 95.28% White, 0.57% African American, 0.31% Native American, 0.61% Asian, 0.11% Pacific Islander, 2.29% from other races, and 0.82% from two or more races. Hispanic or Latino of any race were 4.31% of the population.

There were 10,171 households, out of which 30.7% had children under the age of 18 living with them, 53.0% were married couples living together, 9.4% had a female householder with no husband present, and 34.4% were non-families. 29.1% of all households were made up of individuals, and 14.0% had someone living alone who was 65 years of age or older. The average household size was 2.38 and the average family size was 2.93.

In the city, the population was spread out, with 24.2% under the age of 18, 11.0% from 18 to 24, 26.7% from 25 to 44, 20.7% from 45 to 64, and 17.4% who were 65 years of age or older. The median age was 37 years. For every 100 females, there were 90.8 males. For every 100 females age 18 and over, there were 86.8 males.

The median income for a household in the city was $36,700, and the median income for a family was $45,259. Males had a median income of $31,865 versus $21,035 for females. The per capita income for the city was $18,006. About 5.1% of families and 8.8% of the population were below the poverty line, including 10.1% of those under age 18 and 7.2% of those age 65 or over.

== Economy ==
As of 2016, Fremont's single largest employer was Hormel Foods, with an estimated 1000–1500 workers, whose hog-processing plant has been described as "the nation's largest producer of Spam." The next-largest employers were Fremont Health Medical Center, Fremont Public Schools, and Nye Health Services, each with an estimated 500–1000 employees.

Costco began building a poultry complex in 2019 that includes a processing facility, hatchery and feed mill. The facility is known as the Lincoln Premium Poultry.

== Arts and culture ==
The Louis E. May Historical Museum is housed in a Victorian house built by Fremont's first mayor, Theron Nye, in 1874. A log cabin on the site is an example of the type of dwelling in which the earliest pioneers lived who moved to Nebraska as part of the Homestead Act. Historic downtown Fremont is known for its numerous antique stores and collection of historical buildings.

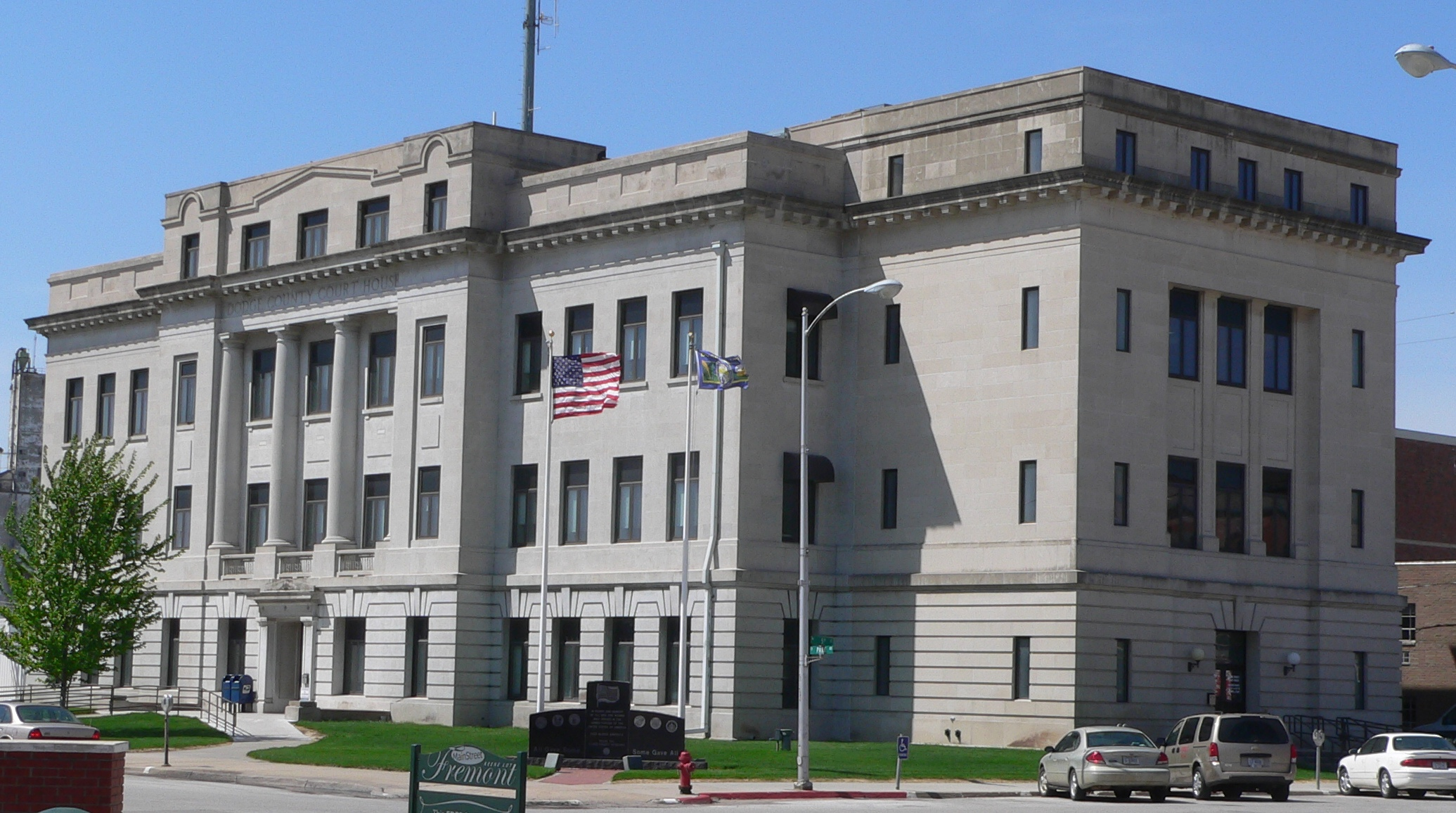
Dodge County Courthouse in Fremont, Nebraska

Several local buildings are on the National Register of Historic Places (NRHP). Among them is the Love-Larson Opera House on Broad Street, built in 1888. Later used as apartments and a grocery store, it was restored for theatre use by a non-profit group in the 1970s, and again in 2003 by the Fremont High Drama Club.

John C. Fremont Days, a festival held the second week of July annually, is a celebration of Fremont's history through a parade, Chautauqua, rodeo, classic car show, and vendors with handmade crafts.

The Fremont Lakes State Recreation Area (also known as "the State Lakes") attracts boaters, skiers, fishermen and beachgoers from the area to the group of 20 man-made, tree-lined lakes which cover nearly 700 acres (2.8 square kilometers) along the north bank of the Platte River. Two regional Boy Scout camps, Camp Cedars and Camp Eagle, are located nearby.

Fremont forms part of the Nebraska Statewide Arboretum collection.

== Parks and recreation ==
Fremont has 21 city-owned parks, with a combined area of over 400 acres (1.6 km^{2}). Located in the northwest corner of Fremont near the "Washington Heights" neighborhood is the Fremont Golf Club (FGC). The FGC was completed in 1930 and features 6,390 yards (5,840 m) of golf from the longest tees for a par of 71.

In 2007 construction of the "Splash Station" water park was completed. The park cost an estimated $5.1 million and features an interactive train slide, combination lap pool and wave pool, body slide and speed slide.

== Education ==
Fremont is the home of the undergraduate liberal arts college, Midland University, which houses the Musbach Art Center, among other attractions. The Metropolitan Community College system has a community college campus in Fremont as well.

There is one public high school, Fremont Senior High, one private K-12 school, Archbishop Bergan Catholic School, and one private elementary-middle school, Trinity Lutheran School.

== Transportation ==
- US 30
- US 77
- US 275

== Notable people ==
- William L. Armstrong, served as a United States representative and senator from Colorado
- Mildred Banfield, Alaska state legislator
- Robert Beerbohm, American comic book historian
- Sue Bierman, San Francisco civic activist and Supervisor
- Gutzon Borglum, sculptor
- Jeanne Boyd, composer and music educator
- Harold Eugene Edgerton, pioneer in stroboscopic photography
- Marg Helgenberger, film and television actress
- Charlie Janssen, Nebraska State Auditor, former member of Nebraska legislature
- Doron Jensen, founder of Timber Lodge Steakhouse
- Richard A. Jensen, theologian and professor at Lutheran School of Theology at Chicago
- Jason Licht, general manager of NFL's Tampa Bay Buccaneers
- James Milliken, Chancellor of the University of Texas System and former President of the University of Nebraska
- Ben Sasse, Former president of the University of Florida and former United States Senator
- Jessica Shepard, WNBA player
- Julie Sommars, film and television actress
- Joey Spellerberg, Nebraska State Treasurer and former mayor of Fremont
- Sloppy Thurston, starting pitcher in Major League Baseball
- Mary A. Hitchcock Wakelin, educator and temperance reformer
- Zach Wiegert, player in the National Football League
