= The Babysitters Coven =

2019 young adult novel by Kate Williams

- First edition
- Author: Kate Williams
- Language: English
- Genre: horror coming-of-age parody
- Publisher: Delacorte Press
- Publication date: 2006
- Publication place: United States
- ISBN: 9780525707370 (hardcover edition)
- OCLC: 1083703970
- Followed by: For Better or Cursed

The Babysitters Coven is a 2019 American young adult fantasy coming-of-age novel by Kate Williams, written as a parody of the 1990s book series The Babysitter's Club by Ann M. Martin. Originally published in hardcover by Delacorte Press, the book follows Esme Pearl, an edgy, social justice-fixated teenager, and her friends as they team up to fight a latent evil descending upon their suburban American town. The book received mixed to negative reviews from critics, owing largely to what was viewed as excessive political commentary, outdated slang and the abrasive personality of the protagonist. The Babysitters Coven was later bought up for reprinting by Penguin Random House. It is the first title in Williams's "The Babysitters Coven" book series, and was followed by a sequel, For Better or Cursed (2020) and a third instalment, Spells Like Teen Spirit (2021).

== Plot ==
Esme Pearl is a nonconformist and suburban Kansas teenager who heads a babysitting club to avoid the prospect of obtaining a paid job, which she finds "gross", and also to earn money to pay back a variety of people for various incidents, including the destruction of a tree. Esme's mother, who lives in a long-term care facility, is mentally ill. This leads to concern that Esme herself might suffer from the same issues when strange occurrences happen around her, such as a drink spilling on a "chauvinist" in the school cafeteria and a bully being harmed in gym class. Esme is surprised when Cassandra Heaven, who is physically attractive, a rebel and a grungy dresser, shows interest in joining the club. While Esme's best friend is Janis, an awkward girl who owns a pit bull, Cassandra is much more sure of herself and confident, and Esme soon discovers that the newcomer is involved with aspects of the supernatural, having received a note telling her to seek out the babysitting club for help. Brian, the school's football coach, reveals to the girls that a dark, demonic force is threatening innocent people in Esme's town, and with white magic, the girls hope to stop it before anybody is harmed.

== Reception ==
The Babysitters Coven received mixed to negative critical reviews. Publishers Weekly noted that the book risked becoming quickly outdated due to its use of digital-age pop culture references and references to modern politics, but also stated that this could be a draw-in for younger audiences, stating, "Williams’s liberal use of slang may cause the novel to date quickly, but together with references to modern politics and pop culture, it grounds the story in the present moment, adding nuance to the premise and deepening connections for contemporary teens." Kirkus Reviews noted the book's racial diversity among characters and praised Williams's descriptive language, but argued that the humour was not funny and that "the characters themselves draw the obvious comparison to Buffy the Vampire Slayer, but despite basic worldbuilding parallels, the novel misses the mark if it’s attempting to fill the cult classic’s large shoes." Smart Bitches Trashy Books rated The Babysitters Coven a "C+" and stated, "Esme is… not a very fun protagonist. She’s wildly insecure but also extremely judgmental. This is a real way that teens are but it is not a good time for a reader, and is sometimes downright cringeworthy." The review also criticized the heavy-handed placement of political phrases such as "intersectional feminist" and said, "as is a common issue in contemporary-set YA, the “lingo” tries VERY hard to sound teen-like while not sounding teen-like at all."
