= Samenlevingscontract =

Dutch romantic cohabitation agreement

Under Dutch law, a samenlevingscontract, loosely translated as "cohabitation agreement", is a written document containing agreements between two persons having a love-relationship and living together without being married. It can not be compared to marriage because Dutch law knows special laws for married couples and the High Court of The Netherlands did decide in 2019 that these laws can not be used for unmarried couples living together. A samenlevingscontract can govern the so-called property relationships between two or more persons who are cohabiting and other fields of law. It does not necessarily imply a marriage-like (or sexual) relationship exists, but the contract can include agreements about any children within the cohabitation arrangement.

For a samenlevingscontract to be valid no special requirements have been set by Dutch law, except for the requirements that are in place for the validity of each contract. So neither does it have to be set up by a notarial deed (made by a Dutch civil-law notary) nor must the couple agree on certain points like taking care of each other financially. On the contrary, the contract must contain the agreements as they will be executed in day-to-day life, to be seen as valid by a judge.

Since the 1980s the contract has been popular among two different groups in Dutch society: people who wanted to formalise their relationship, but did not want to marry, and people who wanted to marry but could not legally do so. With the introduction first of registered partnerships (1998) and later the broadening of marriage to include same-sex couples (2001) in the Netherlands, the need for a cohabitation agreement for the latter has become less pronounced.

== See also ==
- Same-sex marriage in the Netherlands
