= Cohabitation agreement =

Legal document outlining rights and duties of unmarried partners

A cohabitation agreement is a legal agreement reached between a couple who have chosen to live together (whether they are heterosexual or homosexual). In some ways, such a couple may be treated like a married couple, such as when applying for a mortgage or working out child support. However, in some other areas, such as property rights, pensions and inheritance, they are treated differently.

A cohabitation agreement contains documentation for a couple who want to live together in order to protect themselves from unnecessary cost and litigation should their cohabitation break down. They can clearly regulate their property rights and what arrangements might be made for mutual financial support, dealing with debt, caring for children, etc.

The agreement also, much like a prenuptial agreement, allows the individuals concerned to determine in advance who will keep specific assets and what will happen to assets that have been purchased jointly if they separate. This agreement is intended to bind both parties.

== Purpose ==
Cohabitation agreements can provide the members of a relationship the sense that their financial commitments to each other will be enforceable, and that assets acquired or improved during the relationship will be divided fairly. In the absence of an agreement it may be difficult to determine ownership of assets acquired during a relationship. For assets such as real estate or motor vehicles, ownership may be resolved based upon title ownership without regard to whether the partner not named on the title contributed to the purchase or maintenance.

== Common law marriage ==
Common law marriage occurs when two people enter into a marriage without going through the formalities typically required, such as obtaining a marriage license or having a formal marriage ceremony. Not all jurisdictions recognize common law marriage, and there are no common law jurisdictions in which cohabitation of itself will result in a couple being regarded as legally married.

== See also ==
- Civil union
- Prenuptial agreement
- Samenlevingscontract
