= Wayne Municipal Auditorium =

- U.S. National Register of Historic Places
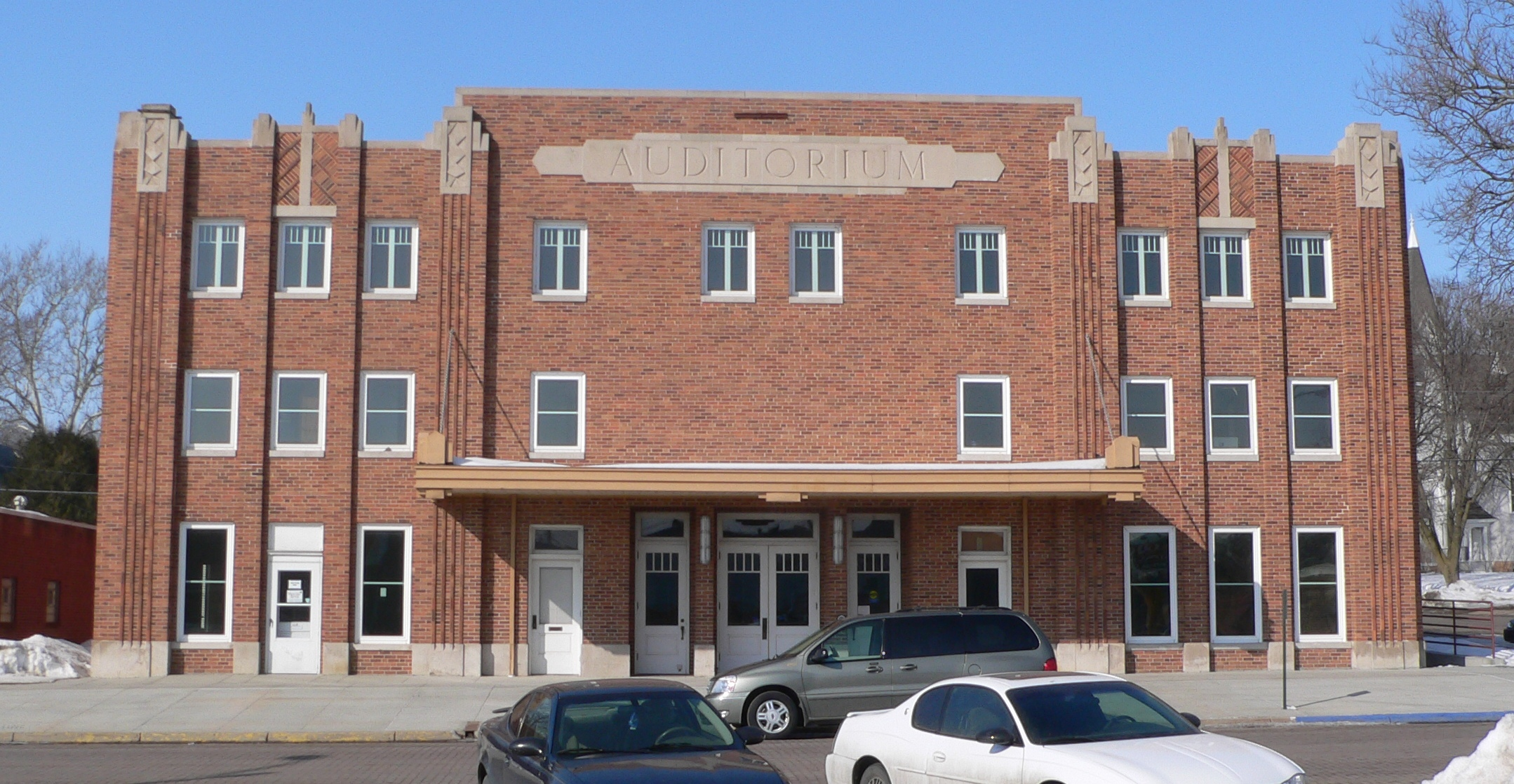
- The building in 2010

- Location within Nebraska Location within the United States
- Location: 222 N. Pearl St., Wayne, Nebraska
- Coordinates: 42.231111°N 97.019444°W
- Area: less than one acre
- Built: 1935
- Architect: George Grabe
- Architectural style: Art Deco
- NRHP reference No.: 02000273
- Added to NRHP: March 28, 2002

The Wayne Municipal Auditorium in Wayne in Wayne County, Nebraska was built in 1935 as a Public Works Administration project. It is Art Deco in style. It was listed on the National Register of Historic Places in 2002.

It is a three-story rectangular building. It has a large auditorium and two other meeting spaces that have served as community meeting places, as a gymnasium, a playhouse, a movie hall, and a commencement hall.
