= Fremont Municipal Auditorium =

- U.S. National Register of Historic Places
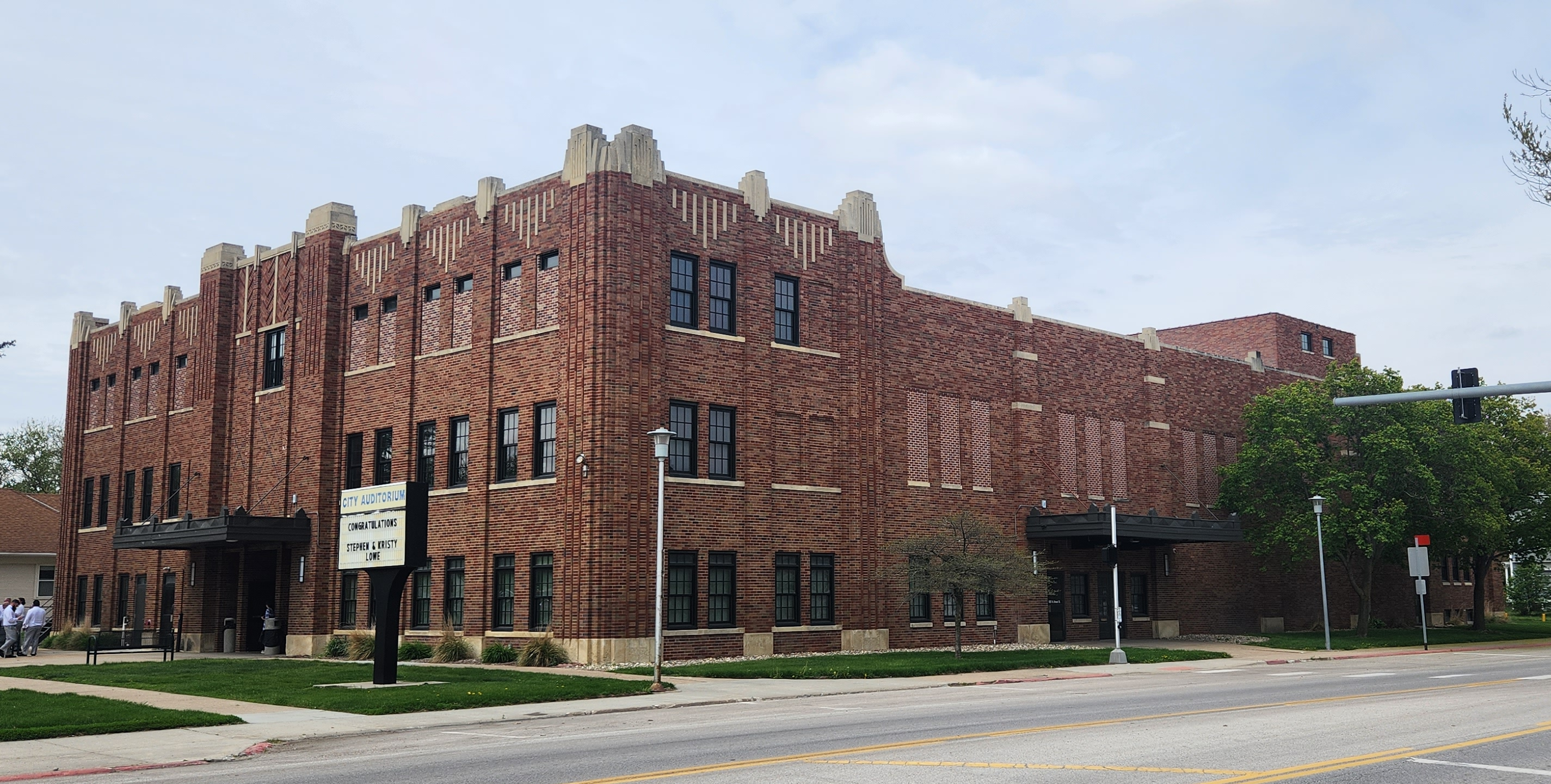
- The auditorium in 2025

- Location within Nebraska Location within the United States
- Location: 925 Broad Street, Fremont, Nebraska
- Coordinates: 41°26′17″N 96°29′54″W
- Area: less than one acre
- Built: 1936–1937
- Built by: Busboom & Ruah
- Architect: George Grabe
- Architectural style: Art Deco
- NRHP reference No.: 02000773
- Added to NRHP: July 11, 2002

The Fremont Municipal Auditorium is a historic building in Fremont, Nebraska. It was built in 1937 with funding from the Public Works Administration, and designed in the Art Deco architectural style. It has been listed on the National Register of Historic Places since July 11, 2002.

== History ==
The Fremont Municipal Auditorium was a project funded by Public Works Administration, having been announced in September 1935. By November, a location was decided and the grant was approved. On March 11, 1936 construction had officially started. The auditorium was officially dedicated on March 1, 1937.

On July 11, 2002, the Fremont Municipal Auditorium was listed on the National Register of Historic Places.

In 2018, plans were announced to renovate the auditorium at a cost of $2 million. In 2019, renovations started, which later included removal of the asbestos. In 2021, renovations to the building were complete.

During renovations to the nearby Keene Memorial Library from 2022 to 2024, the auditorium was used as a temporarily library location.
