= Juno Dawson =

British author (born 1981)

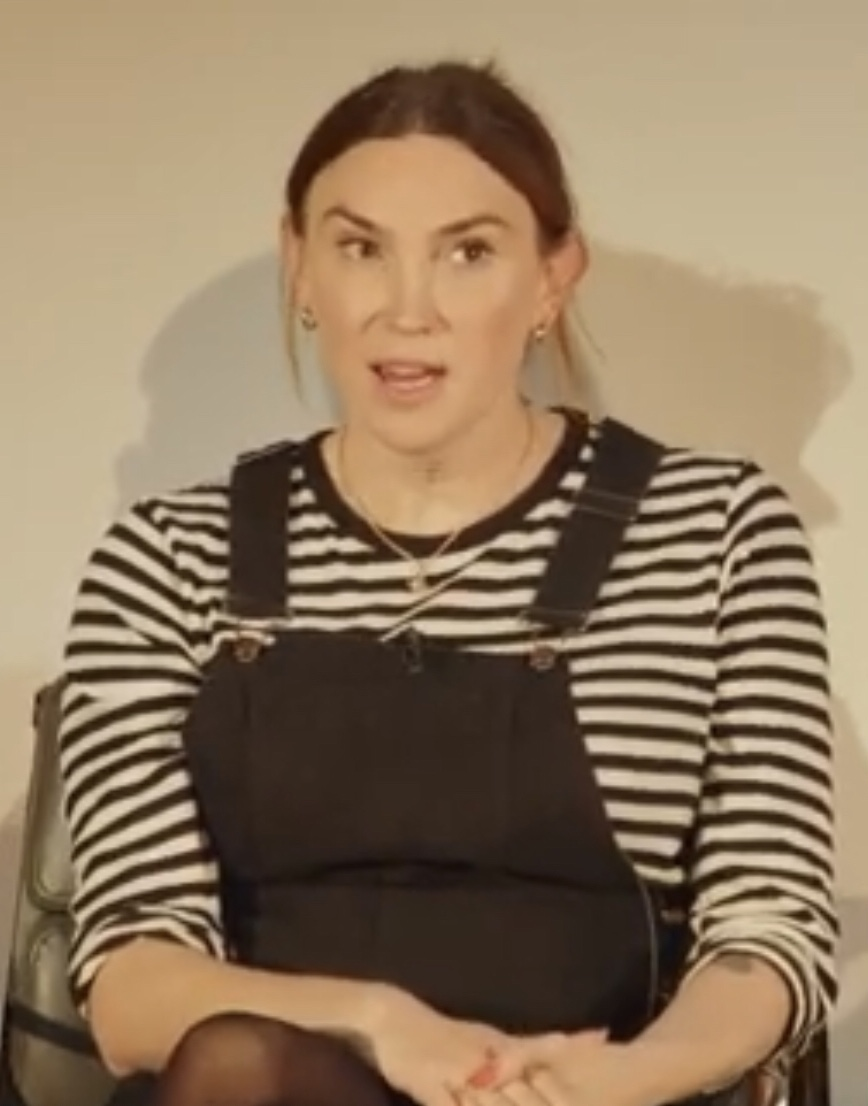
- Dawson in 2023
- Born: 10 July 1981 (age 45); Bingley, West Yorkshire, England
- Education: Bangor University
- Occupations: Author, columnist, actor
- Writing career
- Language: English
- Years active: 2014–present
- Genre: Young adult fiction
- Website: junodawson.com

Juno Dawson (formerly James Dawson; born 10 June 1981) is an English author of young adult fiction and non-fiction. Dawson's notable works include This Book Is Gay, Mind Your Head, Margot & Me, The Gender Games, Clean, Meat Market, and the series Her Majesty's Royal Coven.

== Life and career ==
Dawson was born at Bradford Royal Infirmary, West Yorkshire. Dawson lived in Bingley and was educated at Bingley Grammar School. She has described how her obsession with the "ultra-glam" covers of novels like Prudence as a child gave her a sense that she "[wasn't] very good at being a boy."

After graduating from Bangor University, she worked as a primary school teacher and later became a PSHE coordinator. While a teacher, she wrote books aimed at young adults and became sufficiently successful to leave her teaching job. She wrote a number of young adult fiction books including Hollow Pike and Say Her Name. Her books often feature LGBTQ characters, and Dawson has advocated for other books to feature more prominent LGBTQ representation.

In 2014, Dawson received the Queen of Teen award.

In 2015, Dawson came out as a trans woman, having started transitioning 18 months earlier. She began hormonal transition in early 2016. She was signed to write a column in Glamour magazine documenting her transition experience. She represents the LGBT charity Stonewall as a School Role Model. Dawson was a member of the judging panel for the 2016 BBC Young Writers' Award.

In 2018, Dawson wrote the BBC Sounds spin-off podcast Doctor Who: Redacted, which launched in April 2022. She has also contributed audio plays for the Big Finish Torchwood series.

In 2019, Dawson started the Sex and the City podcast "So I Got To Thinking". She also has small acting roles in I May Destroy You and Holby City.

In January 2025, it was announced that Dawson had joined the writing team of the fifteenth series of Doctor Who, making her the series' first transgender writer. The first episode written by Dawson was The Interstellar Song Contest. She was additionally among the new writers that had been approached for a prospective second series of the 2016 spin-off show Class, prior to it being cancelled.

== Selected texts ==
=== This Book Is Gay (2014) ===
This Book Is Gay, illustrated by Spike Gerrell, was first published in the UK in September 2014 and in the US in June 2015. The book is a "manual to all areas of life as an LGBT person" and "is meant to serve as a guidebook for young people discovering their sexual identity and how to navigate those uncomfortable waters."

This Book is Gay has faced controversy since its publication. In November 2014, residents of Wasilla, Alaska, petitioned to remove it from a public library, with a number of residents objecting to its profanity and sexually explicit content. Dawson responded by saying the event highlighted how "there is still such small-mindedness and hatred left to contend with." In 2022, it was listed among 52 books banned by the Alpine School District following the implementation of Utah law H.B. 374, "Sensitive Materials In Schools". It tied for the tenth-most banned and challenged books in the United States that year, according to the American Library Association's Office for Intellectual Freedom.

=== The Gender Games (2017) ===
In 2017, Dawson published The Gender Games, her first book aimed at adults, discussing themes of gender as well as her own life experiences. Television rights to the book were acquired in 2018 by SunnyMarch, the production company founded by Benedict Cumberbatch.

=== The Good Doctor (2018) ===
In early 2018, it was announced Dawson would write The Good Doctor, one of the first Doctor Who novels to feature the Thirteenth Doctor as played by Jodie Whittaker. The novel was released in October 2018.

== Awards ==
In 2014, Dawson won the Queen of Teen award, a biennial prize (discontinued in 2016) for young adult fiction writers.

Her novel Meat Market won the 2020 YA Book Prize.

Dawson's novel Her Majesty's Royal Coven won the 2022 Books Are My Bag Readers' Award for Fiction.

Dawson's book What’s the T? won the 2022 Educational Writers’ Award.

Bangor University Honorary Doctorate for contribution to Welsh culture, language, music and the arts.

== Works ==
=== Novels ===
- Hollow Pike (2012)
- Cruel Summer (2013)
- Say Her Name (2014)
- Under My Skin (2015)
- All of the Above (2015)
- Spot the Difference (written for World Book Day) (2016)
- Margot & Me (2017)
- Grave Matter (2017)
- Doctor Who: The Good Doctor (2018)
- Proud (2019, editor)
- Stay Another Day (2021)
- Survival Show (2026)

==== London Trilogy ====
- Clean (2018)
- Meat Market (2019)
- Wonderland (2020)

==== Her Majesty's Royal Coven Series ====
- Her Majesty’s Royal Coven (2022)
- The Shadow Cabinet (2023)
- Queen B (2024)
- Human Rites (2025)

=== Non-fiction books ===
- Being a Boy (2013)
- This Book Is Gay (2014)
- Mind Your Head (2016)
- The Gender Games (2017)
- What is Gender? How Does it Define Us? and Other Big Questions (2017)
- What's The T? (2021)

=== Audio dramas ===
- Torchwood: The Dollhouse (2016)
- Torchwood: Orr (2017)
- Doctor Who: Redacted (2022–2023)

=== Television ===
- Doctor Who: "The Interstellar Song Contest" (2025)
