= Belper (constituency) =

Parliamentary constituency in the United Kingdom, 1918–1983

- Former county constituency for the House of Commons
- Belper in Derbyshire, showing boundaries used from 1974 to 1983.

1918–1983
- Created from: Derbyshire South, Mid Derbyshire and Ilkeston
- Replaced by: Derbyshire South, Derbyshire West and Amber Valley

Belper is a former constituency in the UK Parliament. It was created at the 1918 general election as a county division of Derbyshire, comprising the area in the centre of the county and surrounding Derby, and named after the market town of Belper although this was in the north of the constituency. In 1950 it was expanded to include the far south of the county. It was a marginal constituency for most of its existence.

The area had an ever-expanding population after 1945 as prosperous suburbs of Derby were built outside the city boundaries. George Brown, who represented the seat at the time, wrote in 1971 following his defeat in the 1970 general election that "The electorate had increased by over 10,000 since 1966, mainly from the growth of middle-class housing estates, so that most of the new electors could be expected to vote Tory. Since my majority in 1966 was 4,274, an influx of 10,000 new voters, mainly Tory, obviously imperilled the seat." A Boundary Commission report issued in 1969 had recommended changes which would have removed the extra voters, but the Labour government of the time had delayed implementation of the report.

== Boundaries ==
When created in 1918, the constituency consisted of the Urban Districts of Alfreton, Belper and Heage, together with the Rural District of Belper and part of the Rural District of Repton (the civil parishes of Ash, Bearwardcote, Bretby, Burnaston, Dalbury Lees, Egginton, Etwall, Findern, Foremark, Ingleby, Mickleover, Newton Solney, Radbourne, Repton, Trusley, Twyford and Stenson, and Willington).

In 1950, boundary changes removed the Urban Districts of Alfreton and Heage to the Ilkeston constituency, together with the civil parish of Shipley from Belper Rural District. To compensate for this loss of electors, the changes transferred in the rest of the Repton Rural District from the West Derbyshire and South East Derbyshire constituencies. In addition from South East Derbyshire came the Urban District of Swadlincote.

In 1974 the boundaries were realigned with those for local government which had changed to transfer some electors to Derby; the constituency consisted of the urban districts of Belper and Swadlincote, and the rural districts of Repton and Belper except the civil parish of Shipley.

In 1983 the constituency was abolished; the largest part (40,000 voters around Swadlincote) formed the basis of South Derbyshire, 22,000 voters around Belper itself went to West Derbyshire, and 10,000 voters to Amber Valley.

== Members of Parliament ==
Election	Member	Party
1918	John Hancock	Liberal
1923	Herbert Wragg	Conservative
1929	Jack Lees	Labour
1931	Sir Herbert Wragg	Conservative
1945	George Brown	Labour
1970	Geoffrey Stewart-Smith	Conservative
Feb 1974	Roderick MacFarquhar	Labour
1979	Sheila Faith	Conservative
1983	constituency abolished	

== Election results ==
=== Elections in the 1910s ===
General election 1918: Belper
Party	Candidate	Votes	%	±%
Liberal	John Hancock	Unopposed	N/A	N/A
Liberal win (new seat)				

=== Elections in the 1920s ===
General election 1922: Belper
Party	Candidate	Votes	%	±%
Liberal	John Hancock	12,494	61.1	N/A
Labour	Oliver Wright	7,942	38.9	New
Majority		4,552	22.2	N/A
Turnout		20,436	63.6	N/A
Liberal hold		Swing	N/A	

General election 1923: Belper
Party	Candidate	Votes	%	±%
Unionist	Herbert Wragg	9,662	41.8	New
Labour	Oliver Wright	7,284	31.5	−7.4
Liberal	John Hancock	6,178	26.7	−34.4
Majority		2,378	10.3	N/A
Turnout		23,124	70.0	+6.4
Unionist gain from Liberal		Swing		

General election 1924: Belper
Party	Candidate	Votes	%	±%
Unionist	Herbert Wragg	14,766	58.2	+16.4
Labour	Jack Lees	10,618	41.8	+10.3
Majority		4,148	16.4	+6.1
Turnout		25,384	74.5	+4.5
Unionist hold		Swing	+3.1	

General election 1929: Belper
Party	Candidate	Votes	%	±%
Labour	Jack Lees	15,958	43.0	+1.2
Unionist	Herbert Wragg	13,003	35.0	−23.2
Liberal	Thomas Scott Anderson	8,149	22.0	New
Majority		2,955	8.0	N/A
Turnout		37,110	82.7	+8.2
Labour gain from Unionist		Swing	−12.2	

=== Elections in the 1930s ===
General election 1931: Belper
Party	Candidate	Votes	%	±%
Conservative	Herbert Wragg	23,361	60.2	+25.2
Labour	Jack Lees	15,450	39.8	−3.2
Majority		7,911	20.4	N/A
Turnout		38,811	82.0	−0.7
Conservative gain from Labour		Swing	+14.2	

General election 1935: Belper
Party	Candidate	Votes	%	±%
Conservative	Herbert Wragg	20,078	51.1	−9.1
Labour	Jack Lees	19,250	48.9	+9.1
Majority		828	2.2	−18.2
Turnout		39,328	76.8	−5.2
Conservative hold		Swing	−9.1	

=== Elections in the 1940s ===
General election 1945: Belper
Party	Candidate	Votes	%	±%
Labour	George Brown	24,319	52.9	+4.0
Conservative	George Hampson	15,438	33.5	−17.6
Liberal	Robert Archibald Burrows	6,276	13.6	New
Majority		8,881	19.4	+17.2
Turnout		46,033	80.2	+3.4
Labour gain from Conservative		Swing	−10.8	

=== Elections in the 1950s ===
Boundary changes occurred at this point.

General election 1950: Belper
Party	Candidate	Votes	%	±%
Labour	George Brown	30,904	53.2	
Conservative	Michael Argyle	21,581	37.1	
Liberal	John Pickett Lawrie	5,650	9.7	
Majority		9,323	16.1	
Turnout		58,135	88.8	
Labour hold		Swing		

General election 1951: Belper
Party	Candidate	Votes	%	±%
Labour	George Brown	32,875	57.1	+3.9
Conservative	Samuel Middup	24,678	42.9	+5.8
Majority		8,197	14.2	−1.9
Turnout		57,553	86.8	−2.0
Labour hold		Swing	+1.0	

General election 1955: Belper
Party	Candidate	Votes	%	±%
Labour	George Brown	30,214	55.6	−1.5
Conservative	John Twells	24,115	44.4	+1.5
Majority		6,099	11.2	−3.0
Turnout		54,329	81.6	−5.2
Labour hold		Swing	+1.5	

General election 1959: Belper
Party	Candidate	Votes	%	±%
Labour	George Brown	31,344	53.7	−1.9
Conservative	Joyce Ratcliffe	27,007	46.3	+1.9
Majority		4,337	7.4	−3.8
Turnout		58,351	84.2	+2.6
Labour hold		Swing	+1.9	

=== Elections in the 1960s ===
General election 1964: Belper
Party	Candidate	Votes	%	±%
Labour	George Brown	30,481	47.3	−6.4
Conservative	John Lowther	24,169	37.5	−8.8
Liberal	Norman Heathcote	9,807	15.2	New
Majority		6,312	9.8	+2.4
Turnout		64,457	86.1	+1.9
Labour hold		Swing	−1.2	

General election 1966: Belper
Party	Candidate	Votes	%	±%
Labour	George Brown	34,495	53.3	+6.0
Conservative	John Lowther	30,221	46.7	+9.2
Majority		4,274	6.6	−3.2
Turnout		64,716	84.1	−2.0
Labour hold		Swing	+1.6	

=== Elections in the 1970s ===
General election 1970: Belper
Party	Candidate	Votes	%	±%
Conservative	Geoffrey Stewart-Smith	35,757	51.5	+4.8
Labour	George Brown	33,633	48.5	−4.8
Majority		2,124	3.0	N/A
Turnout		69,390	80.1	−4.0
Conservative gain from Labour		Swing	+4.8	

Boundary changes occurred at this point.

General election February 1974: Belper
Party	Candidate	Votes	%	±%
Labour	Roderick MacFarquhar	30,611	51.7	−4.1
Conservative	Geoffrey Stewart-Smith	28,577	48.3	+4.1
Majority		2,034	3.4	+0.4
Turnout		59,188	83.8	+3.6
Labour hold		Swing	−4.1	

General election October 1974: Belper
Party	Candidate	Votes	%	±%
Labour	Roderick MacFarquhar	27,365	47.1	−4.6
Conservative	Simon Newall	21,681	37.4	−10.9
Liberal	Julian Wates	9,017	15.5	New
Majority		5,684	9.7	+6.3
Turnout		58,063	81.6	−1.2
Labour hold		Swing	−3.2	

General election 1979: Belper
Party	Candidate	Votes	%	±%
Conservative	Sheila Faith	27,193	44.4	+7.0
Labour	Roderick MacFarquhar	26,311	42.9	−4.2
Liberal	Malcolm Peel	7,331	12.0	−3.5
National Front	John Grand-Scrutton	460	0.7	New
Majority		882	1.5	N/A
Turnout		61,295	83.6	+2.0
Conservative gain from Labour		Swing	+5.6	
