= Recurring jokes in Private Eye =

The fortnightly British satirical magazine Private Eye has long had a reputation for using euphemistic and irreverent substitute names and titles for people, groups and organisations and has coined a number of expressions to describe sex, drugs, alcohol and other aspects of human activity. Over the years these names and expressions have become in-jokes, used frequently in the magazine without explanation. Some have passed into general usage and can be found in other media and everyday conversation.

== Euphemisms ==
- "Ugandan discussions", or a variation thereof (such as "discussing Ugandan affairs"), is often used as a euphemism for sex, usually while carrying out a supposedly official duty. The term originally referred to an incident at a party hosted in 1973 by journalist Neal Ascherson and his first wife, at which fellow journalist Mary Kenny allegedly had a "meaningful confrontation" with a former cabinet minister in the government of Ugandan president Milton Obote. Kenny later claimed that they were merely "upstairs discussing Uganda", giving rise to the joke. The poet James Fenton apparently coined the term. The saying is sometimes wrongly said to derive from a slanderous lie told by the late Ugandan dictator Idi Amin about his female foreign minister, Princess Elizabeth of Tooro, when he claimed that he had fired her on 28 November 1974 for having sex with an unnamed white man in a toilet at a Paris airport, but this lie was more than 20 months after the phrase was first used by Private Eye on 9 March 1973. If the 'Ugandan' encounter was not completely successful, the phrase "failed to reach Kampala" was used. In 1996, "Getting back to basics" was suggested as a replacement euphemism after the policy of the same name adopted by John Major's government, which some Private Eye contributors regarded as hypocritical. This view was vindicated by Conservative MP Edwina Currie's subsequent confirmation of a four-year affair with Major in her book Diaries.
- "Tired and emotional" is a euphemism for drunk, used in the British press to avoid libel laws. It was coined by Private Eye after a BBC report which used the term in describing 1960s Labour Party Cabinet minister and Deputy Leader George Brown, who was an alcoholic. It first appeared in a parody memo supposedly informing civil servants how to describe George Brown's conduct and state of mind. Due to the near-impossibility of proving intoxication without forensic evidence, journalists came to use the phrase as a way of describing drunkenness without inviting libel charges. In 1957 a trio of Labour politicians, Aneurin Bevan, Morgan Phillips and Richard Crossman, successfully sued The Spectator over just such an allegation, which Crossman admitted in his diary was true of one of the three. The phrase was allegedly first used by a BBC press officer in November 1963, as a description of Brown's condition when interviewed at very short notice on the night of the assassination of John F. Kennedy; the magazine subsequently borrowed the phrase. Doubt is cast on this claim because the programme on which Brown appeared was not broadcast by the BBC but by Associated-Rediffusion. The Defamation Act 2013 introduced a number of important defences.
- "Arkell v. Pressdram" denotes a robust response to a claim of defamation – specifically, "fuck off". Private Eye had covered the case of a Mr J. Arkell, whom the Eye accused of receiving kickbacks from a debt collection agency in his role as retail credit manager at Granada Group. The plaintiff's lawyers wrote a letter which concluded "His attitude to damages will be governed by the nature of your reply." The magazine's response was, in full, "We acknowledge your letter of 29th April referring to Mr J. Arkell. We note that Mr Arkell's attitude to damages will be governed by the nature of our reply and would therefore be grateful if you would inform us what his attitude to damages would be, were he to learn that the nature of our reply is as follows: fuck off." The magazine has since used the exchange as a euphemism for a blunt and coarse dismissal, "We refer you to the reply given in the case of Arkell v. Pressdram". Although there were in fact no legal proceedings and the matter was dropped, the phrase has become part of legal folklore.
- "Trebles all round" refers to large alcoholic drinks in (possibly ironic) celebration of something. It was used for Private Eye itself to celebrate its 50th anniversary.

== Stereotypical and exaggerated personifications of people and organisations ==
- Sir Herbert Gussett is a fictional establishment figure who is forever sending "Dear Sir" letters to the Press, typically The Daily Telegraph or the Daily Express. In the early 1980s, he lived at Lymeswold. Since then, he has given addresses in Wiltshire, Dorset, Oxfordshire and, in 2023, Somerset.
- Sir Bufton Tufton is the Conservative MP for somewhere-or-other, and during the Thatcher Government sat on the backbenches. The name was inspired by that of a real-life Conservative backbencher, Sir Tufton Beamish, who sat for Lewes 1945–1974, but the character was modelled on MPs who were well to the right of Beamish. Sir Bufton's constituency was usually the fictitious safe rural seat of "Lymeswold" (named from a commercially produced cheese), and, although this was subject to topical change, his greed, laziness, bigotry and incompetence remained constant. A file photo was frequently used, which turned out to be a picture of a real-life Conservative councillor, which eventually drew a "good-natured complaint" letter from the "innocent victim".
- Mike Giggler, an e-mail correspondent in newspaper letters pages, usually appearing at the bottom of the page having sent in a particularly unfunny pun as often seen at the bottom of The Guardian letters page.
- Lord Gnome is purported to be the proprietor of the magazine, and is an amalgam of media magnates. Originally modelled on figures including Lord Beaverbrook and Lord Thomson of Fleet, first appearing under the name "Aristides P. Gnome" in the early 1960s, Lord Gnome has since accumulated other characteristics to encompass the likes of Rupert Murdoch. He is portrayed in the magazine as a man of great wealth, greed, unscrupulousness and vulgarity. Lord Gnome rarely writes under his name, but issues his proclamations, editorials and threats through a fictional underling named Emmanuel Strobes, with reference frequently made to His Lordship's "assistant", Miss Rita Chevrolet, a parody of French exotic dancer, Rita Cadillac.
  As well as being a media magnate, Lord Gnome is regularly referred to as having other business interests. Special offers from "Gnomemart" frequently appear in the magazine, which also carries an occasional column called "The Curse of Gnome", chronicling the subsequent misfortunes of those who have in the past taken legal action against the publication. In 1993, during the only televised ceremony for Private Eye's Bore of the Year Awards ("the Boftys"), Lord Gnome (played by Peter Cook) made a brief appearance via satellite hook-up from his yacht, pushing a member of the yacht's crew overboard in a parody of Robert Maxwell's death. The word "Gnome" may refer to the term Gnomes of Zurich. Occasionally, Lord Gnome is an oblique reference to editor Ian Hislop. In the sporting world, Lord Gnome CC is a nomadic cricket team, founded in 1963 and named after the fictitious proprietor.
- Lunchtime O'Booze, a "spineless hack" on the "street of shame" (Fleet Street), who works for an "absurd proprieter" (Lord Gnome). Described as "legendary" in journalism circles by the Canadian historians J. L. Granatstein and Robert Bothwell. After his death in 2021, it was revealed that classical music executive John Boyden had been the magazine's first music correspondent, under the penname Lunchtime O'Boulez.
- Inspector Knacker, also referred to as "Knacker of the Yard", is a senior (and possibly unreliable) police officer. The name alludes both to knackers' yards, where old horses are sent to be put down and their carcasses disposed of, and to "Slipper of the Yard", the nickname given to real-life police Chief Superintendent Jack Slipper of Scotland Yard. The name may be used in reference either to individual policemen ("Another top Knacker resigns"), or to the police in general ("These allegations are being looked into by Inspector Knacker"). If the story refers to police activities in Scotland, Wales, or Ireland, the name may be changed to "McKnacker", "Dai Knacker", or "O'Knacker", respectively.
- Mr Justice Cocklecarrot usually presides over court cases. Beachcomber wrote a humorous column in the Daily Express for over fifty years, and Cocklecarrot J. was a regular feature.
- Sue, Grabbitt and Runne is a fictitious firm of solicitors retained to engage in lawsuits both real and fictional. These are often frivolous, pointless, cynical or without foundation (see Arkell v Pressdram – above) but not always. Danny La Rue, a well-known drag performer, appeared on the front cover in a photograph taken at the Royal Variety Performance of him with Liberace, who was ballooned as saying "I think your English queens are wonderful". La Rue supposedly responded by threatening to "go to the family solicitors, Rue, Grabbit and Son" (he was aggrieved at the implication that he was homosexual). In more serious cases, Private Eye often cites "Carter-Fuck", a derogatory reference to Peter Carter-Ruck of the law firm Carter-Ruck, which had a reputation for taking on defamation cases at great expense to clients and claiming particularly high damages, regardless of the gravity of the case.
- St Cake's School is an imaginary public school, run by Mr R. J. Kipling (BA, Leicester). The headmaster's name is part of the joke regarding the name "St Cake's", in reference to Mr Kipling cakes. Articles featuring the school parody the "Court and Social" columns of The Times and The Daily Telegraph, and the traditions and customs of the public school system. The school’s motto is Quis paget entrat (“He who pays gets in”), although variations on this arise from time to time, such as when the school decided to admit only the daughters of very rich Asian businessmen, and the motto became "All praise to the prophet, and death to the infidel". While the school's newsletters feature extraordinary and unlikely results and prizes, events such as speech days, founders' days, term dates and feast days are announced with topical themes, such as under-age drinking, drug abuse, obesity, celebrity culture, anti-social behaviour and cheating in exams. The school is sometimes referred to as "the Eton of the West Midlands", in reference to that area's relative lack of such schools and the magazine's founders' attendance at Shrewsbury School in that region.
- Neasden is a Greater London suburb which is the location of various parody institutions, and is often given as the origin of fictional letters. In 1971, Richard Ingrams said simply that Neasden was used "to denote the contemporary urban environment". Stories from the world of football are satirised in "reports" by E.I. Addio (a reference to the football chant Ee Aye Addio) about the mythical and notoriously under-performing club Neasden F.C., which plays in the depressing North Circular Relegation League, with quotes from its manager "tight-lipped, ashen-faced supremo Ron Knee (59)" and "the fans" (implying that there were only two) Sid and Doris Bonkers. Sid and Doris Hill are occasionally given as the fans' names, a pun on the suburb of Dollis Hill, which is near Neasden. The club's recent misfortunes lampooned the recent tribulations of major clubs in the national news.
  Often, underneath a spoof sports story, the sub-column "late result" would appear, reporting on a match recently played by Neasden. This normally involved a humorously unlikely team, often one related to current affairs, such as Taleban FC. Neasden nearly always lose by a huge margin, often owing to own goals scored by veteran player "Baldy" Pevsner, who often scores a consolation "one boot", and in spite of the efforts of their goalkeeper, "One-legged net-minder Wally Foot". Neasden is also the setting for the regular column Neasden Police Log, a fictional log-entry style police report that almost invariably depicts the police as racist, incompetent, and obsessed with observing politically correct rules at the expense of maintaining law and order. In 1970, "Neasden" was a brief hit put in the Eye as a throwaway plastic single, sung by William Rushton, who contributed to the Eye as a cartoonist: it can be heard in John Betjeman's TV documentary Metro-land as a backing track. Betjeman also worked briefly on the magazine, establishing its "Nooks & Corners" architecture criticism column.
- Spiggy Topes is, with or without his group The Turds, the archetypal rock star, often used when the magazine wishes to satirise the antics of the more pretentious members of the rock establishment. His persona appears to owe a good deal to John Lennon and Mick Jagger, although Paul McCartney's fashion designer daughter Stella was once referred to as Stella Topes. In some entries, Topes has been knighted and is called, more formally, "Sir Spigismund Topes".
- Dave Spart is a parody of a stereotypical left-wing agitator who featured in editions of the 1970s and from time to time since (for example, after the 2011 England riots and following the split in Jeremy Corbyn's Shadow Cabinet over the bombing of Syria and military intervention against ISIL). Occasionally, his sister, Deirdre Spart, has offered her views. Private Eye often refers to real-life leftist activists as "Spartists", itself a parody of the left-wing Spartacist League. Ken Livingstone is sometimes lampooned as Ken Leninspart.
- A taxi driver writes is a spoof of generally right-wing views of politicians, and parodies taxi drivers' chat with customers, frequently ending with some figure prominent in the news of the day ("I had that [insert name] in the back of the cab the other day... lovely fella") or with blunt advocacy of capital punishment ("String 'em up, I say. It's the only language they understand"). Since the 2022 Russian invasion of Ukraine, it has been replaced with "A Tank Driver writes", the "writer" being a parody of Russian president Vladimir Putin.
- Sir Hartley Redface, archetypal grasping and unscrupulous barrister, so called presumably for the effects on his appearance of his fondness for fine clarets. Usually pleads before the eminent and eminently out-of-touch Judge Cocklecarrot.
- Polly Filler is a female columnist who constantly describes her dealings with put-upon au pairs and her husband "the useless Simon". Her name is a parody of Polyfilla, a British brand of filler typically used to repair small defects in walls and ceilings.
- E. J. Thribb is an insipid poet, eternally aged 17½.
- Snipcock and Tweed is a caricature based on the London publishing firm Weidenfeld and Nicolson, according to Charles Moore in The Spectator, who describes the joke as "slightly antisemitic".
- Dee Nial, a right-wing former Conservative MP who lost her seat in the 2024 election and who writes a column about her activities since leaving Parliament.
- Dame Sylvie Krin is a fictional romantic novelist whose writing is serialised in the Eye. She is a parody of prolific novelists such as Dame Barbara Cartland. Krin's contributions are usually titled "Never Too Old", referring either to Rupert Murdoch's later-life romantic interests, or to the aging Prince Charles' desire to inherit the throne from his mother Queen Elizabeth. Krin's name is a reference to shampoo brand Silvikrin.

== Nicknames, names intentionally misspelled or misstated ==
=== People ===
- Prime Minister Harold Wilson was always named as "Wislon", a name also later applied to A. N. Wilson. Occasionally he was referred to as "Lord Loinwash" an anagram of Harold Wilson.
- Sir James Goldsmith, a frequent and vindictive litigant, was referred to by a number of nicknames including Sir Jams, Sir Jammy Fishpaste, and Sir James Goldfinger. Goldsmith's short-lived magazine Now! was renamed Talbot!
- Writer Paul Johnson is referred to as "Paul 'Loonybins' Johnson".
- Robert Maxwell, another perennial litigant against the Eye, was referred to as Cap'n Bob and the Bouncing Czech, the latter apparently coined by Harold Wilson. Maxwell was a Czech émigré, notably overweight and ebullient (also, a cheque which is returned due to insufficient funds is said to have "bounced").
- Charles III is regularly referred to as "Brian". Historically, Elizabeth II was "Brenda", Prince Philip, Duke of Edinburgh was "Keith", Princess Margaret (Brenda's younger sister) was "Yvonne", and Diana, Princess of Wales, was "Cheryl" – a satire on the perceived nature of Royal affairs as a soap opera.
- From 1964 until his death in 1995, Alec Douglas-Home was referred to as Baillie Vass, after his photograph was mistakenly captioned as such in the Aberdeen Evening Express.
- Piers Morgan is referred to as "Piers Moron" (or Piers "Morgan" Moron).
- Broadcaster Robert Robinson was referred to as "Old Smuggins".
- Mohamed Al-Fayed was known as the "fugger" or "fuggin' fugger"
- Media executive David Montgomery is referred to as "Rommel" – so named by his employees because "Monty was on our side"
- Author Jilly Cooper was referred to by the magazine as 'Jolly Super', a nickname she adopted and used (with variations) for her anthologised journalism, see Jolly Super, Jolly Super Too, Jolly Superlative, Jolly Marsupial, etc.

=== Companies and organisations ===
- Capita, a long-term favourite target of Private Eye, is frequently called "Crapita" and "the world's worst outsourcing firm".
- FirstGroup is usually known as "WorstGroup".
- The Serious Fraud Office is often the Serious Farce Office.
- The Department of Trade and Industry was often the "Department of Timidity and Inaction".
- The Department for Transport (DfT) is usually referred as "DafT".
- The Tony Blair Faith Foundation was similarly known as Drawing All Faiths Together, abbreviated to "Daft".
- The defunct Financial Services Authority (FSA), invariably referred to as "The Fundamentally Supine Authority" in reference to its reluctance to act and its seemingly close relationship with the industry it was supposed to regulate, often contrasting its performance with the swift and draconian methods of its United States counterparts.
- The FSA's replacement body, the Financial Conduct Authority, is usually referred to as the "Financial Cock-up Authority", or the "Fundamentally Complicit Authority" – underlining that it appears to act in a manner little differently from its predecessor.
- Carter-Ruck, a prominent firm of solicitors specialising in libel cases, is almost always referred to as Carter-Fuck.
- The City of Brighton and Hove is referred to as "Skidrow-on-Sea" in the "Rotten Boroughs" column.
- The Daily Telegraph newspaper is usually referred to as the Torygraph because of its political leaning towards the Conservative Party, and as the Daily Hellograph when satirising its coverage of celebrities.
- The Independent is called The Indescribablyboring.
- The Guardian newspaper is generally referred to as The Grauniad, in reference to the paper's reputation for typographical errors and mistakes and its lower-case masthead logo. Former Editor Alan Rusbridger is usually referred to as "Rubbisher". As of December 2025, thegrauniad.com domain name is redirected to the official The Guardian website.
- The Daily Express newspaper has been lampooned as the Daily Getsworse. In previous years, it was called the Daily Titsbychristmas, referring to how it was increasingly copying the style of The Sun, before Express Newspapers launched the down-market Daily Star in November 1978. Since the 2016 UK EU referendum, in which the Express supported Leave, it has also been dubbed The Daily Brexpress.
- The Sunday Times is called The Sunset Times.
- Reach, publisher of the Daily Mirror, the Daily Express and the Daily Star, is usually referred to as "Retch plc".

== Jibes at individuals ==
- Historically the Eye has nicknamed many regular targets for satirical attack. Former Labour Prime Minister Harold Wilson was "Lord Gannex", a name mocking his close association with Joseph Kagan, founder of the Gannex raincoat, who received a knighthood and a peerage from Wilson. Wilson was also sometimes called "Wislon", a nickname later transferred to A. N. Wilson, a columnist and writer. TV and radio presenter Robert Robinson was "Smuggins", so-called because of a supposedly elevated, condescending air he brought to his programmes and because of his Oxbridge manner. Harold Evans, for many years editor of the Sunday Times, was "Dame Harold Evans", perhaps because of his interview mannerisms, and presumably inspired by Dame Edith Evans. Many others were to follow.
- At one point the magazine printed many letters from a reader named "Ena B. Maxwell", of "Headington Hall, Oxfordshire", the real-life address of Robert Maxwell. The letters were written by the Private Eye editorial team, and the pseudonym was attached to suggest that he was writing to the magazine under an assumed identity. The letters were careful not to make any legally actionable claims, instead containing material that was impertinent or absurd in order to ridicule Maxwell. "Ena" still makes occasional appearances in the letters column with varying surnames. Maxwell himself was "Cap'n Bob", a mocking reference to his ownership of a large yacht and regular appearances in a ship captain's cap, and to his former rank of captain in the British Army.
- Mary Ann Bighead, a parody of journalist Mary Ann Sieghart, often writes columns trumpeting her own brilliance and that of her daughters Brainella and Intelligencia.
- A regular feature of the Letters page is "Photo Opportunity", where correspondents concoct spurious reasons for the magazine to print a particular 1995 photo of journalist Andrew Neil embracing a young woman, often described as Asian or mistaken for former Miss India Pamella Bordes – though she is in fact African American. On the photograph's initial printing, it was learned that Neil found the photograph embarrassing, and the Eye has reprinted it frequently since. Neil has described this as an example of "public school racism" on the part of the magazine's editorial staff, which he found "fascinating". The magazine nicknamed him Brillo, after his wiry hair which is seen as bearing a resemblance to a form of kitchen scouring pad. In addition, it often misspells his surname with an extra L, in reference to Neil's relationship with Pamella Bordes, whose name is written with two Ls.
- "(Shome mishtake, shurely? Ed)" is supposedly a blue pencil by the editor, who is slurring a little after lunch. It may have allusions to the late Bill Deedes (Lord Deedes), who did slur that way. He was also the eponymous "Dear Bill" that the fictional Denis Thatcher was forever writing to while his wife Margaret was in government. These articles were actually written by John Wells. Coincidentally, this styling is known as "eye dialect" — a term that pre-dates publication of Private Eye.
- "Dirty Des" is the nickname frequently used for former Daily Express and Daily Star proprietor Richard Desmond. Stories concerning goings on at Desmond's various publications are printed in most editions of the magazine, the nickname alluding to Desmond's ownership of several pornographic magazine titles and television channels and the supposed contradiction between their content and the "family-orientated" content of his mainstream titles.
- British entrepreneur Richard Branson is referred to by the name "Beardie".
- Media mogul Rupert Murdoch gets referred to as the "Dirty Digger".
- Evgeny Lebedev, who publishes The Independent and The Evening Standard, is frequently referred to as "Two Beards", in an "allusion to his alleged closeted homosexuality – though one of his former employees suggests that he might not understand exactly what the name means."
- Sarah Vain, a parody of journalist Sarah Vine, writes an egocentric column in which she often refers to the brilliance of her now ex-husband and his likely accession to the role of Prime Minister (Sarah Vine was married to Michael Gove).
- Former Conservative Chancellor of the Exchequer George Osborne is generally called "Gideon" by the magazine. Osborne was indeed originally named "Gideon", but disliked the name and changed it to "George" as a young man.

== Spurious surrealism ==
Towards the end of each issue, the magazine contains increasingly surreal jokes, references and parodies. Many of these have evolved and are familiar to long-term readers.

- The magazine is frequently referred to as an "organ", in the sense of being a periodical publication, but also providing endless possibilities for sexual innuendo. The word "organ" also refers to the fact that Richard Ingrams, longtime editor of Private Eye, for many years played the organ at services in his local church.
- Numbered lists are usually shorter than stated and include two final entries of "Er..." and "That's it".
- The number 94 is used as a generic large number, to indicate that something is lengthy and boring. This originated with some articles ending mid-sentence with "(continued page 94)" – a page which does not exist. This has since been expanded to anything else involving a number, e.g. "the awards ceremony, in its 94th year", or spoof transcripts of radio broadcasts which end with "(continued 94 MHz)". Readers' letters offering comment or corrections often begin "May I be the 94th reader to point out ..." The magazine's podcast is titled 'Page 94'.
- Phil Space is a fictional journalist. He "writes" articles mainly to “fill space” on the page, hence his name – and similarly Phil Pages, Phil Airtime (a radio news correspondent), Philippa Website, Philippa Space and Philippa Column. The articles are rarely informative or useful and are often irrelevant. Such articles may include the byline, "From our correspondent Phil Space". A supposed continental counterpart, Monsieur Phil(-lippe) Espace, is sometimes mentioned when the story has an international background.
- The regular Private Eye columnist Polly Filler is Phil's female counterpart. Her name refers to Polyfilla, a brand name of spackling paste used to fill in cracks and spaces.
- Trouser presses are another item commonly placed on lists or used in adverts, as an example of pointless extravagance or silly tat.
- They Flew to Bruges is a fictitious war film that often appears in TV channel listings and reviews. The title refers to the hostility of Margaret Thatcher's later cabinets to the European Union and their visits to Europe to argue for lower budgetary contributions by Britain. It is often used to mock the self-importance of anti-EU Conservative MPs, particularly of the older school, like Bill Cash.
- Mr Madeupname is an improbable interviewee, often in a tabloid newspaper article.
- Grapefruit segments – once a pervasive and deliberately out-of-place component of lists (such as features on new cars), now seldom seen.
- Australian appears as a colour option on various spoof ads as in "Available in Blue, Black or Australian".
- The Sizzler – an alleged fried breakfast for sale at extortionate prices on any train journey mentioned. At the first mention of the Sizzler, the article in which it appeared would be sidelined into a recital of the item's deliciousness.
- The Grand Old Duke of York, based on a children's nursery rhyme, is used to parody current military news, such as cutbacks or scandals. For example, reports may appear that the Duke's 10,000 men are being reduced to 100 and will not be marching up any hills because they have no boots.

== See also ==
- Popular beat combo
- Satire
