= Tired and emotional =

British euphemism for being intoxicated

The phrase "tired and emotional" is a chiefly British euphemism for alcohol intoxication. It was popularised by the British satirical magazine Private Eye in 1967 after being used in a spoof diplomatic memo to describe the state of Labour cabinet minister George Brown, but is now used as a stock phrase. The restraints of parliamentary language mean it is unacceptable in the House of Commons to accuse an MP of being drunk, but one may use this or other euphemisms such as "not quite himself" and "overwrought". The Guardian describes the phrase as having joined "those that are part of every journalist's vocabulary". Because of this widespread interpretation, one source cautions professional British journalists against its use as, "even if the journalist meant it literally", it could be considered defamatory.

== Origin ==
In 1937, BBC commentator Thomas Woodrooffe had behaved so oddly on radio that he was suspended for a week; the BBC's official explanation was that he had been "tired and emotional", an excuse that was new at the time.

According to legend, George Brown appeared on the BBC following the assassination of John F. Kennedy in 1963, and a BBC presenter subsequently described him as "tired and emotional". In reality, Brown appeared on ITV, and although he was criticised for his apparent intoxication, no evidence of the phrase being broadcast has been found. It is also said to have its origin in a statement to the press by Brown's election agent, Edward Eldred, who made excuses for him after he had behaved badly in public by saying that he was "tired and emotional". The phrase became associated with Brown, who already had a reputation for alcohol abuse. The Sunday Times wrote that "George Brown drunk is a better man than Harold Wilson sober", and The Independent said "Brown became a bit of a figure of fun, and, thanks to Private Eye's favourite euphemism for his regular condition, he bequeathed the English language the expression 'tired and emotional'." The 1993 biography by journalist Peter Paterson, which included Brown's "fondness for the bottle", was titled Tired and Emotional: The Life of Lord George Brown.

== Usage ==
In 2002, Irish football analyst Eamon Dunphy appeared on RTÉ, the Republic of Ireland's state broadcaster, during its coverage of the 2002 World Cup, and was taken off-air during the programme and suspended. Dunphy subsequently apologised to viewers, saying, "I arrived for work tired and emotional, I think is the euphemism. And I was tired. I'd had a few drinks. I hadn't slept and I think wasn't fit to fulfil my contract."

In 2004, Private Eye noted when The Sun newspaper, after an incident involving Prince Harry, then 20, attacking a member of the paparazzi following a night out at a London club quoted a "senior Clarence House source" as saying of Harry, "He'd been drinking and was tired and emotional."

BBC foreign affairs correspondent John Simpson described the "erratic" Serbian politician Vuk Drašković as "tired and emotional" in a live news report from Belgrade broadcast on the UK evening news. He also used the term in relation to Drašković in a BBC news article entitled "Change in the air in Belgrade".

The Wall Street Journal used the euphemism in September 2010 to describe the Irish Taoiseach Brian Cowen after he was accused by Fine Gael politician Simon Coveney on Twitter of being "halfway between drunk and hung over" during an early morning radio interview.

== See also ==
- Recurring in-jokes in Private Eye
- Colourful racing identity
- Terminological inexactitude, a British parliamentary euphemism for lying
- Confirmed bachelor, a euphemism for homosexuality also used by Private Eye
