= Jack Lees =

British Labour Party politician

Member of Parliament for Belper
- In office 30 May 1929 – 27 October 1931
- Preceded by: Herbert Wragg
- Succeeded by: Herbert Wragg

Personal details
- Party: Labour Party

Jack Lees (1884 – 11 August 1940) was a British Labour Party politician who served as Member of Parliament (MP) for Belper in Derbyshire from 1929 to 1931.

Born in West Rainton in County Durham, Lees became a coal miner and joined the Northumberland Miners' Association, eventually becoming a full-time union official.

He contested Belper unsuccessfully at the 1924 general election, losing by over 4,000 votes to the sitting Conservative Party MP Herbert Wragg. At the 1929 election he took the seat with a majority of 2,955, but at the 1931 general election Wragg retook the seat with a majority of nearly 8,000. He stood again at Belper in the 1935 general election but was again defeated. Lees did not stand for Parliament again.

Parliament of the United Kingdom
| Preceded by Herbert Wragg | Member of Parliament for Belper; 1929–1931 | Succeeded by Herbert Wragg |
Party political offices
| Preceded by W. E. Moll | Independent Labour Party National Administrative Council; Member for the North East; 1920–1925 | Succeeded by Fred Tait |
