= Geoffrey Stewart-Smith =

British Conservative politician

(Dudley) Geoffrey Stewart-Smith (29 December 1933 – 13 March 2004) was a British Conservative politician. He served one term as Member of Parliament (MP) for Belper in Derbyshire after he defeated the Deputy Leader of the Labour Party George Brown. Inside and outside Parliament, he was a fervent anticommunist, and a leading member of the Conservative Monday Club.

== Family ==
Geoffrey Stewart-Smith was born on 28 December 1933 in Ceylon, the only son and youngest child of Dudley Cautley Stewart-Smith and Phyllis née Luson. He was educated at Winchester College and the Royal Military Academy Sandhurst. He subsequently served as an officer in the Black Watch regiment (1952–1960), including time in Nigeria and Germany. His marriage in 1956 ended in divorce in 1990. There were three sons of the marriage.

== Entry to politics ==
In the 1960s, Stewart-Smith was active in anticommunist circles, was a supporter of Edward Martells's Freedom Group and worked on The New Daily. Apart from his numerous publications, in 1965, he recommended a form of recreation of the wartime Political Warfare Executive and the Special Operations Executive to "counter subversion". The following year, he became an advisor to British Military Volunteer Forces, a group who had planned to send at least a battalion of British volunteers to fight with the Americans in the Vietnam War. Stewart-Smith had lengthy discussions with Colonel Frederick Lash, the US Military Attaché in London on this issue. The British government, however, opposed the plan.

In 1967, he organised an interdenominational service at the Royal Albert Hall to commemorate all who had died at the hands of communists. His estimate was that the total was then about 95 million, which was printed on the back of the programme of the service. More than 4,500 refugees from behind the Iron Curtain attended it. He was disappointed that only two MPs and two peers attended and said that to be "typical".

== Publications ==
In 1962, Stewart-Smith founded the Foreign Affairs Circle, the British section of the World Anti-Communist League (WACL), which published the anti-Soviet East-West Digest, a fortnightly publication sent free of charge to all MP's.

Stewart-Smith later founded the Foreign Affairs Publishing Company, which continued East-West Digest, and published works from the British Right, such as Brian Crozier. It also distributed publications from British anti Union groups, such as Aims for Industry, Common Cause, the Economic League and IRIS.

== Parliamentary activity ==
Stewart-Smith was selected as the Prospective Parliamentary Candidate for Belper, Derbyshire, in 1966, and spent four years actively campaigning in the constituency to build up his profile. The constituency had been held by the Labour Party, but their hold grew increasingly tenuous, with prosperous suburbs of Derby encroaching on the seat. Sensationally, at the 1970 general election he ousted George Brown by 2,124 votes.

Regarded as a good constituency MP by fellow members, Stewart-Smith demanded that Edward Heath's government raise their pay offer to miners during the crippling strike. He also attacked Margaret Thatcher on the end of school milk during the same administration. However, his work was not enough to prevent him losing his seat in the February 1974 general election after boundary changes removed a large area of Conservative strength and the national trend favoured Labour.

== After Parliament ==
Stewart-Smith decided not to seek re-adoption. He concentrated on publishing anticommunist literature, mainly through the Foreign Affairs Publishing Company of which he was a director. The company lasted until it went into liquidation in 1986.

In 1966, Stewart-Smith was chairman of the Conservative Monday Club foreign affairs study group.

From 1968, he was editor of the East-West Digest and a regular columnist in the Financial Times.

He was Director of the Foreign Affairs Circle, and the Freedom Communications International News Agency.

In 1974, he sought to distance his Foreign Affairs Circle from the World Anti-Communist League because of the latter's perceived strong anti-Semitic element, saying: "We wouldn't touch them with a barge pole".

In March 1975, he was one of the principal speakers at the Monday Club's successful two-day Conference in Birmingham, the theme being "The Conservative Party and the Crisis in Britain".

From 1976 to 1986, he was Director of the Foreign Affairs Research Institute.

In 1978, he issued a press statement about what he claimed was the growing number of ex-communists and left-wing extremists in the Labour Party.

He was a City of London Liveryman, belonging to the Grocers' Company.

== Publications ==
- The Defeat of Communism (Preface by Salvador de Madariaga) (Foreign Affairs Publishing Co.,(FAPC), Petersham, Surrey, 1964)
- No Vision Here (Foreword by the Right Honourable Julian Amery, M.P.) (FAPC, Petersham, Surrey, 1966)
- Brandt and the Destruction of NATO (Petersham, 1973)
- The Hidden Face of the Labour Party (Petersham, 1978)
- The Struggle for Freedom (Petersham, 1980)
- East West Digest - Journal of the Foreign Affairs Circle (Monthly) (FAPC), published throughout the 1960s and 1970s.

Parliament of the United Kingdom
Preceded by George Brown	Member of Parliament for Belper; 18 June 1970 – February 1974	Succeeded by Roderick MacFarquhar
