= Knacker =

Person who removes animal carcasses

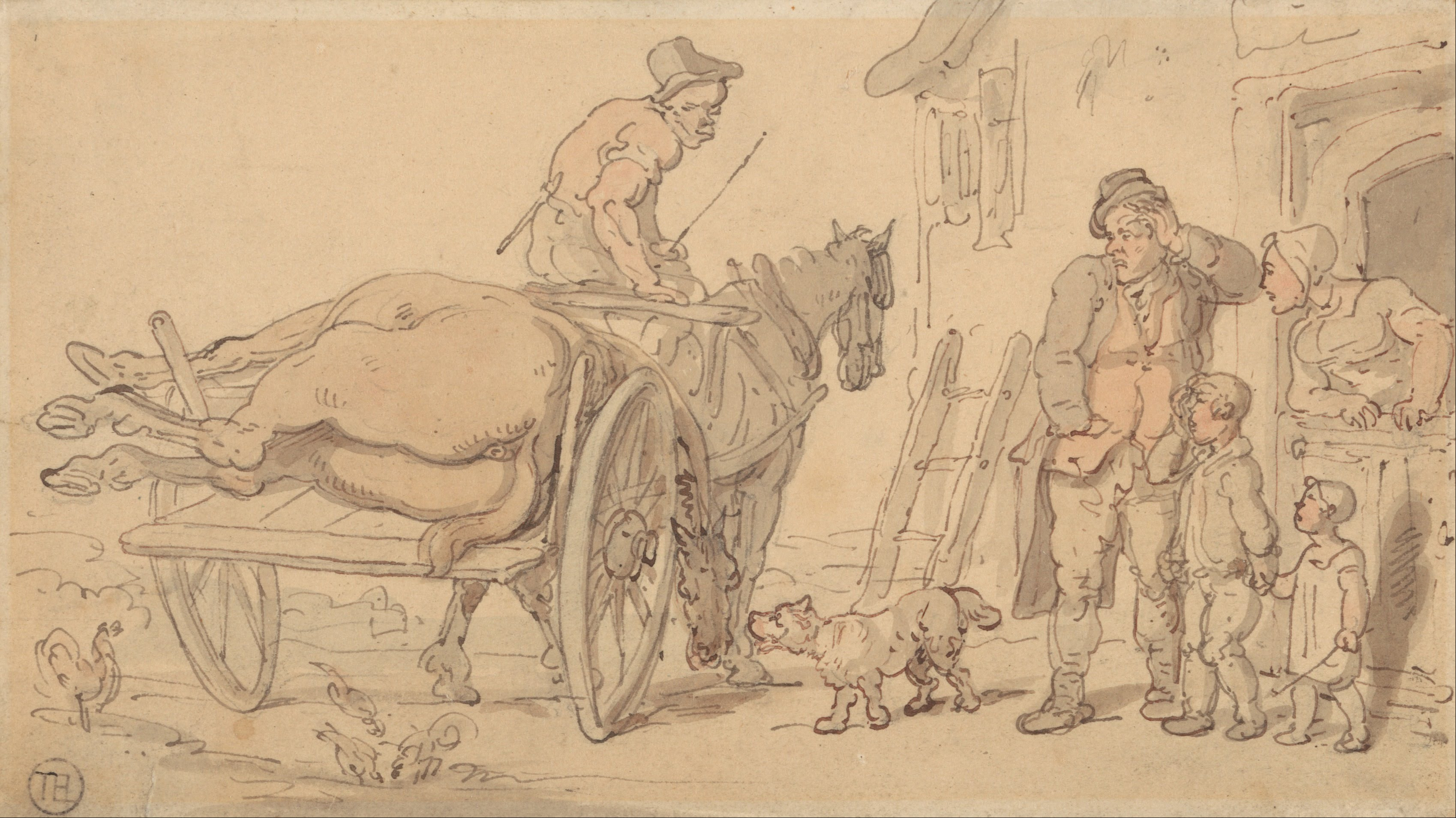
"A Dead Horse on a Knacker's Cart", drawing by Thomas Rowlandson (1757–1827)

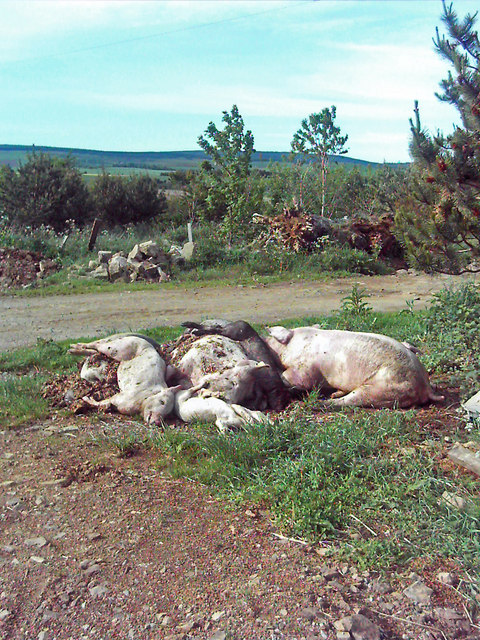
A group of dead pigs awaiting pickup by a local knackery, dumped at the edge of a farm site in Scotland; pig farmers in particular prefer the knackery truck not to come close to where live pigs are kept as this is a way that disease can be spread.

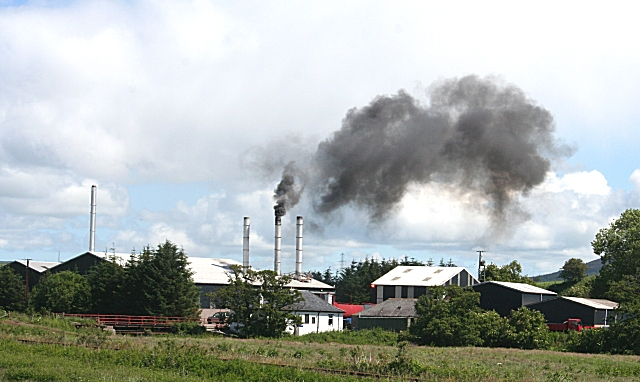
Smoke discharging from incinerators at Douglasbrae Knackery, Scotland. The business deals with the disposal of animal carcasses from all over the north-east of Scotland.

A knacker (/ˈnækər/), knackerman or knacker man is a person who removes and clears animal carcasses (dead, dying, injured) from private farms or public highways and renders the collected carcasses into by-products such as fats, tallow (yellow grease), glue, gelatin, bone meal, bone char, sal ammoniac, soap, bleach and animal feed. A knacker's yard or a knackery is different from a slaughterhouse or abattoir, where animals are slaughtered for human consumption. Since the Middle Ages, the occupation of "knacker man" was frequently considered a disreputable occupation. Knackers were often also commissioned by the courts as public executioners.

== Etymology ==
The oldest recorded use of the word "knacker" dates to 1812, meaning "one who slaughters old or sick horses" and in 1855 "to kill, castrate", and is believed to be the same word as the earlier knacker/nacker "harness-maker" from the 1570s, surviving in 18th century dialects. The sense extension is perhaps because "knackers" provided farmers with general help in horse matters, including the disposal of dead horses and animals. The word is of uncertain origin, perhaps from the Scandinavian word represented by Old Norse hnakkur, saddle, and related to hnakki, "back of the neck", possibly relating to neck.

== Legal definitions ==
The term is in this literal sense in British English and Irish English, and gained some notoriety during the outbreak of mad cow disease (BSE) in the United Kingdom. The Slaughterhouses Act 1974, the Meat (Sterilisation and Staining) Regulations 1982, and the Food Safety Act 1990 all define a "knacker's yard" as "any premises used in connection with the business of slaughtering, skinning or cutting up animals whose flesh is not intended for human consumption".

Knackery by-products are rendered under regulation into fats and meat and bone meal for incineration. Cattle hides may be recovered for leather production. The kinds of animal processing which can occur at knackeries are defined by law, for example, in Australia by the Commonwealth Meat Inspection Act 1983. In the EU, the legislation covering knackeries is Regulation (EC) No 1069/2009 of 21 October 2009. It regulates animal by-products and derived products not intended for human consumption.

== Slang use ==
"Knackered" meaning tired, exhausted or broken in British and Irish slang is commonly used in Australia, Ireland, Newfoundland, New Zealand, and the United Kingdom.

The word has also been used as a derogatory term against members of the Travelling Community in Ireland. There have been some calls to cease the use of slang terms like "knacker drinking" and "knackered" as a result. In Ireland, "knacker drinking" refers to the practice of consuming alcohol in the open, e.g. in a field or a park, or by a roadside or canal; the drink is typically cheap cider, beer or vodka from an off licence. "Knacker drinking" is commonly done by teenagers or students.

The British satirical magazine Private Eye often refers to senior police figures as "Inspector Knacker" or the police force in general as "Knacker of the Yard", a reference to Jack "Slipper of the Yard" Slipper.

Automotive junkyards, salvage yards or recyclers may also be referred to as "knackers' yards" or "knackers". "Knackers" is also a British/Australasian vulgar slang for testicles.
