= Popular beat combo =

British slang term

Popular beat combo, which originated as a synonym for "pop group", is a phrase that occurs in British culture. It may also be used more specifically to refer to The Beatles, or other such purveyors of beat music.

The phrase is frequently used in Private Eye and in the BBC panel game Have I Got News For You, making fun of Ian Hislop's supposed lack of knowledge about modern music.

== Derivation ==
It is widely held that the phrase "popular beat combo" was coined in an English courtroom in the 1960s, where a judge asked (for the benefit of the court's records) "Who are The Beatles?" and a barrister replied "I believe they are a popular beat combo, m'lud."

However, neither the question nor the answer has ever been reliably attributed, and they remain the stuff of urban legend. Marcel Berlins, legal correspondent for The Guardian newspaper, failed in his attempt to track down any verification. In 2007, Berlins restated his offer of "a bottle of best Guardian champagne to any reader with a solution". Christie Davies attributes the encounter to Judge James Pickles.

The phrase is part of a trope in postwar British culture where judges are seen to be out of touch. An archetypical example is from the 1960 obscenity trial of Lady Chatterley's Lover, in which the legal profession was ridiculed for being out of touch with changing social norms when the chief prosecutor, Mervyn Griffith-Jones, asked jurors to consider if it were the kind of book "you would wish your wife or servants to read".

== See also ==
- Recurring jokes in Private Eye
