= Herbert Wragg =

British politician

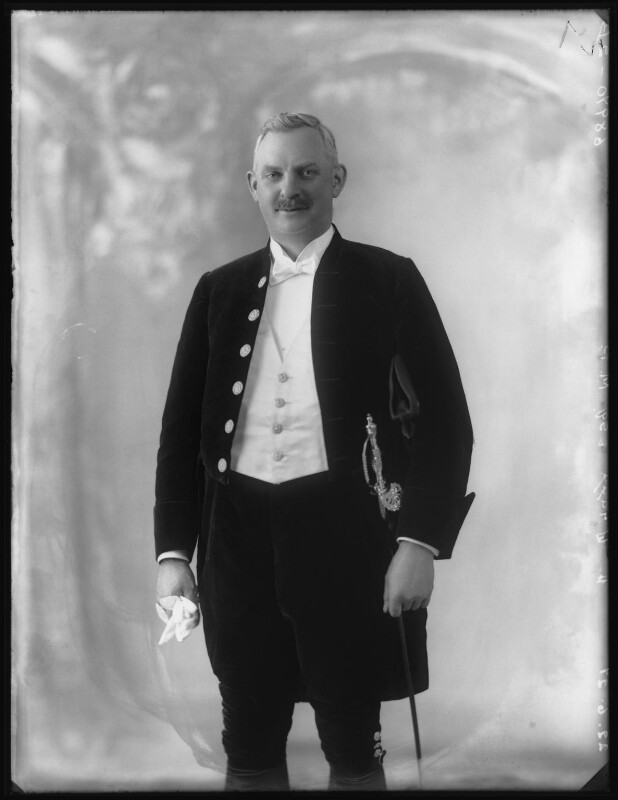
Wragg

Sir Herbert Wragg (1880 – 13 February 1956) was a British Conservative Party politician who served as Member of Parliament (MP) for Belper in Derbyshire from 1923 to 1929 and from 1931 to 1945.

He was first elected at the 1923 general election, winning the seat from the Liberal MP John Hancock. He was re-elected at the 1924 election, but at the 1929 general election he lost the seat to the Labour candidate Jack Lees.

Wragg regained the seat at the 1931 general election, and represented Belper in the House of Commons until he retired at the 1945 general election.

He was a son of John Downing and Maria Wragg; his two brothers, Frederick William and Norman John, were killed in the First World War. The family grave is in St Wystan's Churchyard, Bretby. He was chairman of Thomas Wragg and Sons, Ltd, glazed ware manufacturers. Sir Herbert Wragg Way in Swadlincote is named after him.

Parliament of the United Kingdom
Preceded by John George Hancock	Member of Parliament for Belper; 1923–1929	Succeeded by Jack Lees
Preceded by Jack Lees	Member of Parliament for Belper; 1931–1945	Succeeded by George Brown
