= Unparliamentary language =

Words that offend the dignity of an assembly

Parliaments and legislative bodies around the world impose certain rules and standards during debates. Tradition has evolved that there are words or phrases that are deemed inappropriate for use in the legislature whilst it is in session. In a Westminster system, this is called unparliamentary language and there are similar rules in some but not all other legislative systems. This includes, but is not limited to, the suggestion of dishonesty or the use of profanity. Most unacceptable in Westminster systems is any insinuation that another member is dishonourable. So, for example, in the British House of Commons any direct reference to a member as lying is unacceptable, even if the allegation is substantively true. A conventional alternative, when necessary, is to complain of a "terminological inexactitude".

Exactly what constitutes unparliamentary language is generally left to the discretion of the Speaker of the House. Part of the speaker's job can be to enforce the assembly's debating rules, one of which is that members may not use "unparliamentary" language. That is, their words must not offend the dignity of the assembly. In addition, legislators in some places are protected from prosecution and civil actions by parliamentary immunity which generally stipulates that they cannot be sued or otherwise prosecuted for anything spoken in the legislature. Consequently, they are expected to avoid using words or phrases that might be seen as abusing that immunity.

Like other rules that have changed with the times, speakers' rulings on unparliamentary language reflect the tastes of the period. The Table, the annual journal of the Society of Clerks-at-the-Table in Commonwealth Parliaments, includes a list of expressions ruled unparliamentary that year in the national and regional assemblies of its members.

== Partial list, by country ==
=== Australia ===
==== Federal Parliament ====
In the Australian Senate, the words "liar" and "dumbo" were ordered to be withdrawn and deemed unparliamentary during a session in 1997.

Profanity is almost always considered unparliamentary language in both houses of the Australian Parliament, and in all other Australian legislatures. Hence, the words fuck and cunt are almost always avoided. However, other words such as shit and bullshit are more commonly used, but are still generally considered unparliamentary.

Utterances found to be unparliamentary in the Australian Parliament include:

- "... these so-called electoral reforms are a massive stitch-up by the major parties to cement their power and influence. We've got to keep the two old white guys running against each other every election!"
- "You're a proven racist. ... Withdraw—given the findings against him? He was sacked by the UK Prime Minister for being that. He was literally sacked for that reason."
- "What this will do is essentially Dutton-proof that scheme, Leader-of-the-Opposition-proof that scheme."

==== Queensland ====
In the Queensland Parliament, utterances found to be unparliamentary include:

- "He is so arrogant and out of touch and thinks himself so great that he is the only member in this House who could polish the chandeliers with his nose, because he is constantly looking over and out above everybody."
- "The scab nurses' union and the scab ambulance union did not stand up for their supposed members ..."
- "... as opposed to the member for Maryborough, who not only looks like a clown but sounds like one and behaves like one."
- "Bugger. I was on a roll. Sorry."
- "... and said the team's main KPI was to provide media which would 'give the Labor minister a stiffy'."
- “barely more respectable than that of a warlord.”
- "We get the balance of power, very simply that means that we have the testicles of the Government in our hand at every given stage" [quoting from a source]
- Steve then went on to use three angry emojis and two swearing emojis
- They were exciting times in my household during that era because my son very proudly was the "arse of the ass"
- the entire LNP front bench—was a conga line of suckholes sucking up to Malcolm Turnbull and Queenslanders
- You were the biggest peanut there
- "They can't. They're muppets" and "I take that interjection. They are muppets"
- Pantomime man. You goose.
- ... we cannot even get the Premier and certainly the Treasurer to mention the c-word [reference to coal].
- Of course, she is coming as a jellyfish, because they do not have a spine
- ...the Premier more or less told me to bugger off
- ...a councillor who was a bit of a dropkick
- Fruit loop [in reference to the National Party backbench]
- You goose!
- We have a Treasurer who is a goose, an absolute goose
- Apparatchik ... owned by the RTBU, the ETU and AFULE ...
- Suck up to her union mates
- "You're a dog."
- "WTF? [sic]" The State of Origin is not culturally significant to Queensland?
- I referred to the Leader of the Opposition as the Eeyore of Queensland politics.
- Treated us all like mushrooms—kept us all in the dark and fed us crap.
- Bullshit
- It is a bloody disgrace
- I was asked to sit down and give you the opportunity to jump because you were sooking.
- I withdraw the comment that the Treasurer is a "tossing" Treasurer and say that he is a "coin-flipping Treasurer"
- You nitwit
- You knucklehead
- In the words of the Prime Minister, this budget is crap
- It is my belief that the member for ... is too lazy to read the amendments. He must have had his head in a chaff bag to not have even considered this.
- Like bloody hell!
- It is always interesting following the female fascist from Nanango.
- My view is this: if you lie down with corrupt dogs, you get up with corrupt fleas
- Maggot!
- You're the one that buggered it up ... you're a hypocrite.
- He has a bit of trouble with his medication at times.
- He has wind coming out both ends.
- ... is the hairy-nosed wombat of environment ministers across Australia.
- I hope there are no drunks using light poles.
- you gutless wonders
- Far Knuth
- He knew he was in for a pizzling—sorry.
- ... the troglodytes over there in the LNP
- You are spivs and scumbags.

=== Belgium ===
In Belgium, there is no such thing as unparliamentary language. A member of parliament is allowed to say anything they wish when inside parliament. This is considered necessary in Belgium to be able to speak of a democratic state and is a constitutional right. Nevertheless, when on 27 March 2014, Laurent Louis called the Prime Minister Elio Di Rupo a pedophile, the other members of parliament left the room in protest. This immunity that manifests itself in an absolute freedom of speech when in parliament does not exist when outside of parliament. In that case, prosecution is possible when and if the majority of parliament decides so.

=== Canada ===
These are some of the words and phrases that speakers through the years have ruled "unparliamentary" in the Parliament of Canada, the Legislative Assembly of Alberta, the Legislative Assembly of Manitoba, the National Assembly of Québec, and the Legislative Assembly of Ontario:

- Parliamentary pugilist (1875)
- a bag of wind (1878)
- inspired by forty-rod whisky (1881)
- coming into the world by accident (1886)
- blatherskite (1890)
- the political sewer pipe from Carleton County (1917)
- lacking in intelligence (1934)
- a dim-witted saboteur (1956)
- liar (1959, 2022)
- devoid of honour (1960)
- joker in the house (1960)
- ignoramus (1961)
- scurrilous (1961)
- to hell with Parliament attitude (1961)
- trained seal (1961)
- evil genius (1962)
- demagogue (1963)
- Canadian Mussolini (1964)
- Canadian Hitler (1964)
- sick animal (1966)
- pompous ass (1967)
- crook (1971)
- does not have a spine (1971)
- fuddle duddle (1971)
- pig (1977)
- jerk (1980)
- sleazebag (1984)
- racist (1986, 1997 and 2020)
- absolute fraud (1986)
- lying scum (1987)
- scuzzball (1988)
- traitor (1992)
- son of a bitch (1997)
- modern‑day Klansmen (2002)
- weathervane (2007)
- Il Duce (2007)
- you piece of shit (2011)
- fart (2016)
- he doesn't give a fuck (2018)
- "Séraphin Poudrier", a character representing extreme greed in Québec pop culture (2019)
- “The only thing that I regret about Margaret Thatcher’s death is that it happened probably 30 years too late.” (2020)
- crap (2021)
- wacko (2024)

=== Fiji ===
In the Parliament of Fiji, there has been debate over what is considered unparliamentary language. In 2021, then-Speaker Ratu Epeli Nailatikau ruled that the word "imbecile" was not considered unparliamentary language.

=== Hong Kong ===
The President of the Legislative Council has ruled a number of expressions to be offensive, insulting, or unparliamentary, including:

- "foul grass grows out of a foul ditch" (臭罌出臭草, 1996)
- "stupid" (戇居, 1997)
- "rubber stamps" (1999)
- "impudently and shamelessly" (2004), "shameless" (2005)
- "dog class" (2006)
- "stumbling to death on the street" (仆街, lit. "stumble on street", pronounced puk gaai, 2009), "PK" (abbreviation of puk gaai, 2019)
- "dog shit" (狗屎, 2010)
- "castrati", "eunuch" (2010)
- "lackey" (2011), "lackey and slave" (2019)
- "kissed the wrong ass" (拍馬屁拍着馬春袋, lit. "slapped a horse's ass but ended up slapping the horse's scrotum", 2013)
- "like a dog running around, snapping at people" (2014)
- "chickens" (雞, which could also mean female prostitute, 2016)
- "flunkey" (走狗, lit. "running dog", 2017)
- "a shrew hurling abuse on the street" (潑婦罵街, 2017)
- "you are dickhead(s), bullying us egghead(s)" (2017)
- "dog official" (狗官, 2019)
- "scumbag" (2019)
- "lying" (2019)
- "despicable and low-down" (賤格下流, 2019)
- "you had better chop off that Member's head" (2019)
- "habitually eat foreign sausage" (食慣洋腸, inferring sex with a white man, 2019)
- "you, the self-proclaimed Chairman", "the phoney Chairman" (2020)
- "ignoble" (賤, 2020)

=== India ===
In 2012, the Indian Parliament published a book of words and phrases that were considered to be unparliamentary:

- Ali Baba and the Forty Thieves
- bad man
- badmashi ("mischief")
- bandicoot
- blackmail
- blind
- deaf and dumb
- bluffing
- bribe
- bucket of shit
- communist
- confused mind
- dacoit
- darling (said to a female MP)
- deceive
- double-minded
- double-talk
- downtrodden
- goonda
- lazy
- liar
- loudmouth
- lousy
- nuisance
- racketeer
- radical extremist
- rat
- ringmaster
- scumbag
- thief
- thumbprint (to an illiterate MP)

In July 2022, the Lok Sabha Secretariat came up with a booklet of unparliamentary words with an additional list of the following:

- abused
- ahankaar ("arrogance")
- anarchist
- apmaan ("disrespect")
- asatya ("untrue")
- ashamed
- baal buddhi ("childlike intellect"),
- bechara ("helpless")
- behri sarkar ("deaf government")
- betrayed
- bloodshed
- bloody
- bobcut
- chamcha ("sycophant")
- chamchagiri ("sycophancy")
- cheated
- chelas ("disciples")
- childishness
- corrupt
- Covid spreader
- coward
- criminal
- crocodile tears
- daadagiri ("rowdyism")
- dalal ("middleman"/"agent")
- danga ("riot")
- dhindora peetna ("to make a song and dance")
- dictatorial
- disgrace
- dohra charitra ("dual character")
- donkey
- drama
- eyewash
- foolish
- fudge
- gaddar ("traitor")
- ghadiyali ansu ("crocodile tears")
- girgit ("chameleon")
- goons
- hooliganism
- hypocrisy
- incompetent
- Jaichand (used metaphorically to refer to a traitor)
- jumlajeevi ("one who lives by fake promises or gimmicks")
- kala bazaari ("black marketing")
- kala din ("black day")
- Khalistani,
- khareed farokht ("buying-selling")
- khoon se kheti ("farming from blood")
- lie
- lollypop
- mislead
- nautanki ("drama")
- nikamma ("good-for-nothing")
- pitthu
- samvedanheen ("insensitive")
- sexual harassment
- Shakuni
- Snoopgate
- taanashah ("dictator")
- taanashahi ("dictatorship")
- untrue
- vinash purush ("destruction man")
- vishwasghat ("betrayal")

=== Ireland ===
In Dáil Éireann, the lower house of the Oireachtas (Irish parliament), the chair (Ceann Comhairle or replacement) rules in accordance with standing orders on disorderly conduct, including prohibited words, expressions, and insinuations. If the chair rules that an utterance is out of order, then typically the member withdraws the remark and no further action occurs. The relevant words are retained in the Official Report transcription despite being formally withdrawn. The chair cannot rule if they did not hear the words alleged to be unparliamentary. A member who refuses to withdraw a remark may be suspended and must leave the chamber. A periodically updated document, Salient Rulings of the Chair, lists past rulings, ordered by topic, with reference to the Official Report. Rulings superseded by subsequent changes to standing orders are omitted. It is disorderly for one Teachta Dála (TD; deputy) to "call another Deputy names", specifically including:

brat, buffoon, chancer, communist, corner boy, coward, fascist, gurrier, guttersnipe, hypocrite, rat, scumbag, scurrilous speaker, or yahoo;

or to insinuate that a TD is lying or drunk. The word "handbagging" is unparliamentary "particularly with reference to a lady member of the House". Allegations of criminal or dishonourable conduct against a member can only be made by a formal motion. Conduct specifically ruled on includes selling one's vote, violation of cabinet confidentiality, and doctoring the Official Report. Charges against a member's political party are allowed; the chair decides whether an allegation is "personal" or "political". Members may not refer to the Dáil or its proceedings as a:

circus, farce, slander machine.

During a December 2009 debate, Paul Gogarty said, "With all due respect, in the most unparliamentary language, fuck you Deputy [Emmet] Stagg." He immediately apologised and withdrew the remark. The debate's temporary chairman at the time lacked the Ceann Comhairle's power to suspend disorderly members; in any case, once Gogarty withdrew the remark he was not out of order, although his words led to general disorder in the chamber. Gogarty's apology noted ("rather tenuously") that the word fuck was not explicitly listed in the Salient Rulings. Ensuing calls for tougher sanctions led the Dáil Committee on Procedure and Privileges (CPP) to refer the matter to a subcommittee, which said the correct response was for the CPP to issue a formal rebuke, as had in fact been done to Gogarty.

After heated interruptions to a November 2012 debate, Ceann Comhairle Seán Barrett said "This is not a shouting match, like gurriers on a street shouting at each other." A spokesperson said gurriers was not out of order since it was not addressed at an individual.

=== Italy ===
In Italian history, the unparliamentarian language was the only limit to free speech of a deputy. So it was claimed by Giacomo Matteotti in his last discourse in the Chamber of Deputies:

I ask to speak not prudently, nor imprudently, but parliamentarianly

— Giacomo Matteotti

In addition, during the Republic, the use of foul language in Parliament produced jurisprudence by the constitutional court, which has implemented the libel suits.

=== Kenya ===
In June 2024, Kenyan Member of Parliament TJ Kajwang used the unparliamentary phrase "deeper shit" during a heated budget debate in the National Assembly. He used the phrase to warn that citizens and the government might face severe economic hardships and financial trouble if budget issues or public borrowing were not handled properly.

=== New Zealand ===
The Parliament of New Zealand maintains a list of words, and particularly phrases, that the Speaker has ruled are unbecoming, insulting, or otherwise unparliamentary. These include:

- Members hated the sight of khaki (1943)
- I would cut the honourable gentleman's throat if I had the chance (1946)
- idle vapourings of a mind diseased (1946)
- his brains could revolve inside a peanut shell for a thousand years without touching the sides (1949)
- Member not fit to lick the shoes of the Prime Minister (1959)
- energy of a tired snail returning home from a funeral (1963)
- Could go down the Mount Eden sewer and come up cleaner than he went in (1974)
- Intestinal fortitude (1974)
- Racist (1977)
- The Arapawa Goat (1980)
- Ditch the bitch (1980)

The Parliament also maintains a list of language that has been uttered in the House, and has been found not to be unparliamentary; this includes:

- commo (meaning communist, 1969)
- scuttles for his political funk hole (1974)

=== Norway ===
In 2009, a member of the Progress Party was interrupted during question period by the Speaker for calling a minister a "highway bandit".

=== Singapore ===
On 11 July 2023, People's Action Party (PAP) MP Tan Chuan-Jin made a public apology to Workers' Party (WP) MP Jamus Lim after a clip of him using "unparliamentary language" during a 17 April parliamentary sitting was shared on Reddit. As Speaker of Parliament, Tan was heard saying "fucking populist" shortly after Lim had finished a 20-minute speech urging the PAP government to further help lower-income groups and to establish an official poverty line. Lim accepted his apology.

=== United Kingdom ===
In the House of Commons of the United Kingdom, the following words have been deemed unparliamentary over time: bastard, blackguard, coward, deceptive, dodgy, drunk, falsehoods, git, guttersnipe, hooligan, hypocrite, idiot, ignoramus, liar, misled, pipsqueak, rat, slimy, sod, squirt, stoolpigeon, swine, tart, traitor, and wart.

In addition, accusations of "crooked deals" or insinuation of the use of illicit substances by a member are considered unparliamentary language (all attributable to Dennis Skinner). An accusation that an MP's presence in the house has "been bought" is also unparliamentary.

The word 'dodgy' when used by Ed Miliband, was not however, found to be unparliamentary. Coventry South MP, Zarah Sultana had used the word "dodgy" against transport secretary Grant Shapps and his fellow cabinet member Jacob Rees-Mogg. However, it was found to be unparliamentary in 2016 when it was used by Skinner to refer to Prime Minister David Cameron.

In 2019, in the run up to the Conservative leadership election, SNP leader Ian Blackford accused Boris Johnson of being a racist. Asked to withdraw the term by the speaker, Blackford confirmed that he had informed Johnson about his intention to use it and qualified his statement. The speaker then allowed it to stand. In the following week he accused Johnson of being a liar ("has made a career out of lying"). No request was made by the speaker to withdraw this statement.

In 2021, Labour MP Dawn Butler was ejected from the Commons for accusing Boris Johnson of lying repeatedly to the House. When asked by the deputy speaker to "reflect on her words" after the first statement, Butler replied "It's funny that we get in trouble in this place for calling out the lie, rather than the person lying" whereupon she was ordered to withdraw from the House.

It is not unparliamentary to accuse an MP of lying if the accusation forms the basis of a substantive motion in the House. This allowed, for example, John Profumo to be censured by the House in 1963 after he had been found to have lied to the police as part of the Profumo affair, and Boris Johnson in 2023 after the Committee of Privileges found he had repeatedly lied to Parliament regarding his knowledge of illegality during the Partygate affair.

The mention of the word "batshit" by the Shadow Home Secretary in November 2023 was not regarded as unparliamentary in that no intervention was made by the Speaker during the debate. It also wasn't raised in any of the points of order soon after. Search of House of Commons Hansard reveals a number of occasions involving the word "shit" that have gone without intervention in recent times including mention by Boris Johnson as Prime Minister in September 2019. Although the Mirror newspaper called this "very unparliamentary", the Speaker did not in fact intervene. As regards euphemisms, the word "effing" was criticized as unparliamentary by the Speaker during one of the Brexit debates but the mention of the phrase "eff business" by Keir Starmer during a more recent session of Prime Minister's Questions did not cause intervention.

==== Northern Ireland ====
The Speaker of the Northern Ireland Assembly, William Hay, gave a ruling in the chamber on 24 November 2009 on unparliamentary language. In essence rather than making judgements on the basis of particular words or phrases that have been ruled to be unparliamentary in the Assembly or elsewhere the Speaker said that he would judge members' remarks against standards of courtesy, good temper and moderation which he considered to be the standards of parliamentary debate. He went on to say that in making his judgement he would consider the nature of members' remarks and the context in which they were made. In 2013, Hay ruled that insinuation of MLAs being members of proscribed organizations was unparliamentary language. In 2025, Alliance Party MLA Nuala McAllister was ejected from the chamber for calling the Deputy Speaker Steve Aiken "patronising" and for refusing to withdraw the comment.

==== Wales ====
In the Senedd the Presiding Officer has intervened when the term "lying" has been used. In December 2004, the Presiding Officer notably sent Leanne Wood out of the chamber for referring to Queen Elizabeth II as "Mrs Windsor". In 2024, Senedd politicians were told not to use the word "blanket" to refer to the 20mph speed limit.

=== United States ===
While the United States does not have a parliament, the United States House of Representatives has censured several representatives for "unparliamentary language" in the past, though no successful vote on those grounds has occurred since 1921.

== Avoiding unparliamentary language ==
It is a point of pride among some British MPs to be able to insult their opponents in the House without using unparliamentary language. Several MPs, notably Sir Winston Churchill, have been considered masters of this game.

Some terms which have evaded the Speaker's rules are:

- Terminological inexactitude (lie)
- Being economical with the truth (lying by omission), since used on the floor of the house as an insult or taunt.
- Tired and emotional, a euphemism for intoxicated

Clare Short implicitly accused the Employment minister Alan Clark of being drunk at the despatch box shortly after her election in 1983, but avoided using the word, saying that Clark was "incapable". Clark's colleagues on the Conservative benches in turn accused Short of using unparliamentary language and the Speaker asked her to withdraw her accusation. Clark later admitted in his diaries that Short had been correct in her assessment. In 1991, Speaker Bernard Weatherill adjudged that usage of the word "jerk" by Opposition leader Neil Kinnock, who had applied that epithet to Robert Adley, was not unparliamentary language.

== Sources ==
- Dáil Éireann (February 2011). Salient Rulings of the Chair; Covering the period to 8 March 2006 (to Volume 616 of the Official Report of the Debates) (PDF) (4th ed.).
- Dáil Éireann CPP (Committee on Procedure and Privileges) (May 2010). Report on Parliamentary Standards (PDF). Oireachtas.
