= Economical with the truth =

Euphemism for dishonesty

To be economical with the truth literally means to avoid revealing too much of the truth. While the idea may have an approbatory sense of prudence or diplomacy, the phrase is often either used euphemistically to denote dissimulation (misleading by withholding pertinent information) or else used ironically to mean outright lying. The term parsimonious with the truth is also sometimes used in the same way.

== Origins ==
The Oxford Dictionary of Modern Quotations and Kenneth Rose trace the idea to Edmund Burke, the first of whose Letters on a Regicide Peace, written in 1795 and published in 1796, included:

Falsehood and delusion are allowed in no case whatever: But, as in the exercise of all the virtues, there is an œconomy of truth. It is a sort of temperance, by which a man speaks truth with measure that he may speak it the longer.

The religious sense of "economy" was applied to religious truth by John Henry Newman, based on Jesus' injunction not to cast pearls before swine. Newman advocated "cautious dispensation of the truth, after the manner of a discreet and vigilant steward" while being "careful ever to maintain substantial truth". Mental reservation is a somewhat related idea also associated with Roman Catholic ethics.

A jocular reference to the basic concept was made by Mark Twain in Following the Equator in 1897:

Truth is the most valuable thing we have. Let us economise it.

The precise phrase "economical with the truth" is attested from 1897. It was used in the New Zealand House of Representatives in 1923, and the House of Commons of Canada in 1926; "over-economical with the truth" was used in the British House of Commons in 1968. In Paul Brickhill's 1950 book The Great Escape, the phrase is an ironic description of the testimony of an interrogated Gestapo officer.

Alan Durant of Middlesex University describes the phrase prior to 1986 as having "extremely restricted currency" and as a rule used in allusion to either Burke or Twain.

== Political catchphrase ==
"Economical with the truth" became a political catchphrase in the United Kingdom in 1986 during the Spycatcher trial in the Supreme Court of New South Wales, Australia. Robert Armstrong, the UK Cabinet Secretary, was questioned by then-barrister Malcolm Turnbull about a letter to the publisher asking for advance copies of a book, falsely implying that the government did not already have copies:

- Q: So that letter contains a lie, does it not?
- A: It contains a misleading impression in that respect.
- Q: Which you knew to be misleading at the time you made it?
- A: Of course.
- Q: So it contains a lie?
- A: It is a misleading impression, it does not contain a lie, I don't think.
- Q: What is the difference between a misleading impression and a lie?
- A: You are as good at English as I am.
- Q: I am just trying to understand.
- A: A lie is a straight untruth.
- Q: What is a misleading impression – a sort of bent untruth?
- A: As one person said, it is perhaps being economical with the truth.

Bob Ellis wrote that the audience had laughed at "bent untruth", and that Armstrong expected a laugh for "economical with the truth" but got none. Political opponents of the government's actions in the Spycatcher case derided Armstrong's distinction.

In 1992, when Alan Clark was questioned at the Old Bailey by Geoffrey Robertson in an Arms-to-Iraq case, he accounted for the discrepancies between his testimony and statements he had made previously. His response became notorious:

- Clark: it's our old friend "economical"
- Robertson: with the truth?
- Clark: With the actualité. There was nothing misleading or dishonest to make a formal or introductory comment that the Iraqis would be using the current orders for general engineering purposes. All I didn't say was 'and for making munitions'.

Alan Durant was an expert witness in a 1992 libel suit brought by a man who had been described as "economical with the truth". The defendant claimed the words did not imply the plaintiff was a liar. Durant, after examining a corpus of uses of the phrase, felt that lying had become the default meaning, but might be over-ridden based on the context. The earlier allusion to Burke or Twain was no longer common. The libel suit was settled out of court.

== See also ==
- Paltering
- Terminological inexactitude
- Unparliamentary language
- Half-truth
