= Bearwardcote =

Civil parish in the South Derbyshire district of Derbyshire, England

Coordinates: 52.898°N 1.581°W

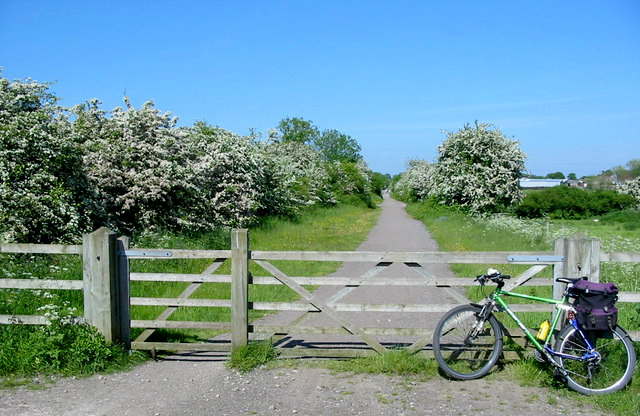
- A crossing on the former Burton on Trent to Derby railway serves Bearwardcote Farm. The line is now a popular multiuser trail between Mickleover and Etwall.

- Location within Derbyshire
- Population: 26
- OS grid reference: SK282334
- District: South Derbyshire
- Shire county: Derbyshire
- Region: East Midlands
- Country: England
- Sovereign state: United Kingdom
- Post town: MICKLEOVER
- Postcode district: DE3
- Police: Derbyshire
- Fire: Derbyshire
- Ambulance: East Midlands

Bearwardcote is a civil parish in the South Derbyshire district of Derbyshire, England. According to the 2001 census it had a population of 26. The hamlet is located 3 mi (4.8 km) from Mickleover, 3 mi (4.8 km) from Willington and 4 mi (6.4 km) south west of Derby.

In the Anglo-Saxon period, bears were first kept for the purposes of diversion or baiting. The officer in charge was called the "bearward"; hence Bearwardcote points out his place of residence.
