= George Brown, Baron George-Brown =

British politician (1914–1985)

The Right Honourable The Lord George-Brown PC
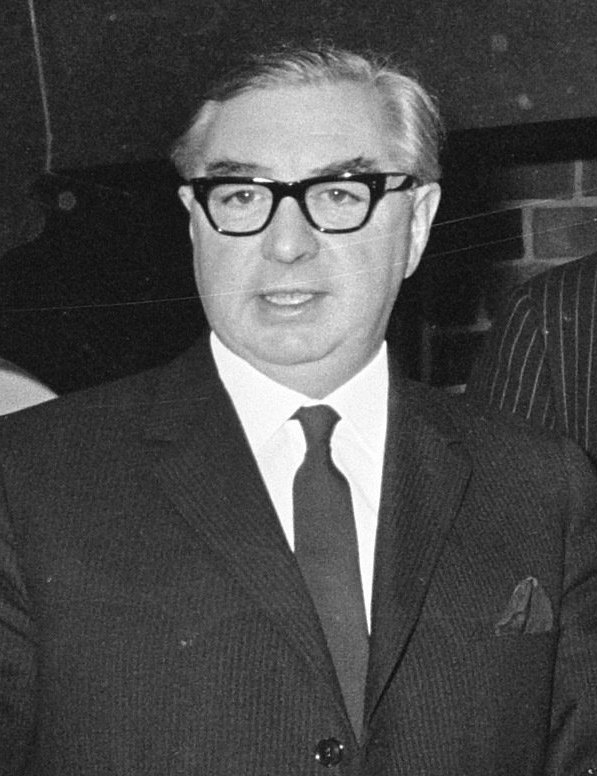
- Brown in 1967

Foreign Secretary
- In office 11 August 1966 – 15 March 1968
- Prime Minister: Harold Wilson
- Preceded by: Michael Stewart
- Succeeded by: Michael Stewart

First Secretary of State
- In office 16 October 1964 – 11 August 1966
- Prime Minister: Harold Wilson
- Preceded by: Rab Butler (1963)^{[a]}
- Succeeded by: Michael Stewart

Secretary of State for Economic Affairs
- In office 16 October 1964 – 11 August 1966
- Prime Minister: Harold Wilson
- Preceded by: Office created
- Succeeded by: Michael Stewart

Leader of the Opposition
- In office 18 January 1963 – 14 February 1963
- Monarch: Elizabeth II
- Prime Minister: Harold Macmillan
- Preceded by: Hugh Gaitskell
- Succeeded by: Harold Wilson

Deputy Leader of the Labour Party
- In office 10 November 1960 – 19 June 1970
- Leader: Hugh Gaitskell; Harold Wilson
- Preceded by: Aneurin Bevan
- Succeeded by: Roy Jenkins

Shadow Home Secretary
- In office 30 November 1961 – 16 October 1964
- Leader: Hugh Gaitskell
- Preceded by: Patrick Gordon Walker
- Succeeded by: Henry Brooke

Shadow Minister of Defence
- In office 27 November 1956 – 30 November 1961
- Leader: Hugh Gaitskell
- Preceded by: Richard Stokes
- Succeeded by: Patrick Gordon Walker

Shadow Minister of Labour and National Service
- In office 15 February 1956 – 27 November 1956
- Leader: Hugh Gaitskell
- Preceded by: Aneurin Bevan
- Succeeded by: Alfred Robens

Minister of Works
- In office 26 April 1951 – 26 October 1951
- Prime Minister: Clement Attlee
- Preceded by: Richard Stokes
- Succeeded by: David Eccles

Parliamentary Secretary to the Ministry of Agriculture and Fisheries
- In office 7 October 1947 – 26 April 1951
- Prime Minister: Clement Attlee
- Preceded by: Percy Collick
- Succeeded by: Arthur Champion

Member of Parliament for Belper
- In office 5 July 1945 – 29 May 1970
- Preceded by: Herbert Wragg
- Succeeded by: Geoffrey Stewart-Smith

Member of the House of Lords Lord Temporal
- In office 10 November 1970 – 2 June 1985; Life peerage

Personal details
- Born: George Alfred Brown; 2 September 1914 Lambeth, London, England
- Died: 2 June 1985 (aged 70) Truro, Cornwall, England
- Party: Labour (until 1976); SDP (1985)
- Spouse: Sophie Levene (m. 1937; sep. 1982)
- Children: 2
- a. Office vacant from 18 October 1963 to 16 October 1964.

George Alfred George-Brown, Baron George-Brown (né Brown; 2 September 1914 – 2 June 1985), was a British Labour Party politician who was Deputy Leader of the Labour Party from 1960 to 1970 and held several Cabinet roles under Prime Minister Harold Wilson, including Foreign Secretary and First Secretary of State.

After leaving school at the age of 15, Brown began work as a clerk, before joining the Transport and General Workers' Union. He rose quickly through the union ranks as an organiser, and shortly before the 1945 election he was chosen as the Labour Party candidate for the seat of Belper. He defeated the Conservative incumbent and went on to hold the seat until his own defeat at the 1970 election. He briefly served in the Attlee government as Minister of Works in 1951. After Labour lost office he was appointed to the Shadow Cabinet, and came to be regarded as a leader of the trade-union-supporting faction on the right of the Labour Party. Following the sudden death of Aneurin Bevan in 1960, Brown was successful in the election to replace him as Deputy Leader of the Labour Party.

Three years later, following the sudden death of Hugh Gaitskell, Brown became Acting Leader of the Labour Party, and consequently was briefly Leader of the Opposition. He stood in the election to gain the role permanently, but was beaten by Harold Wilson; one factor in his defeat was concern from colleagues about the impact of his well-known alcoholism, an affliction that remained with him through his life. Following Labour's victory at the 1964 election, Wilson appointed Brown as First Secretary of State, making him the next-most senior member of the Cabinet, and appointed him to the new position of Secretary of State for Economic Affairs, in an ultimately unsuccessful attempt to curtail the power of HM Treasury.

Two months after Labour's landslide victory at the snap 1966 election, Wilson moved Brown to the role of Foreign Secretary, a job he had always coveted. Despite this, Brown continued to struggle with his alcoholism, and after several arguments with Wilson in 1968, the two agreed that Brown would resign. Brown lost his seat of Belper in 1970, and shortly thereafter was elevated to the House of Lords; he insisted, having always been known simply as "George Brown", that upon taking his peerage in November 1970 he would combine his first name and surname to create his title, Baron George-Brown, of Jevington in the County of Sussex.

== Early life ==
Brown was the eldest of four children born to George Brown and Rosina Harriett (née Mason), at Flat 22, I Block, Peabody Buildings, Duke Street, Lambeth, in the flat of his maternal grandmother, Ann Martha Mason, widow of a Scottish asphalter; the flat was in a working-class housing estate built by the Peabody Trust, a housing charity. Soon after the birth, his family left and moved to the Peabody Trust block at Peabody Square, Blackfriars Road, Southwark, near Waterloo station. His father, of a family long settled in The Borough, but who believed themselves to have Irish origins, had worked in his earlier years as a grocer's packer, then as a lorry and van driver (for Lyons, later for the Evening Standard), and served in the First World War as a chauffeur to senior British Army officers; he later became a fur salesman. A staunch trade unionist, he eventually served as a member of the executive council of the Transport and General Workers' Union, and was later employed as a full-time official. Aspersions were thus cast on his son's 'working-class credentials' in light of what were perceived to be (however inaccurately given his English, Scottish and Irish forebears) his 'East End commercial middle-class Jewish' roots.

Brown attended Gray Street Elementary School in Blackfriars where he did well enough to pass an entrance examination to the West Square Central School, a junior grammar school and now part of a conservation area. Brown had already adopted his parents' left-wing views and later claimed to have delivered leaflets for the Labour Party in the 1922 general election when he was eight years old.

The school wanted Brown to stay on beyond the age of 15, but he decided to leave to earn his living and help his parents financially. He started work as a junior clerk in the ledger department of a City firm, but was made redundant after pressing his fellow clerks to join a trade union. From 1932, he worked as a fur salesman for the John Lewis Partnership, dropping his Cockney accent to appeal to society customers. Brown earned a great deal on commission. During this time, Brown continued his education through London County Council evening schools and the Workers' Educational Association. The poverty of his upbringing led Brown in later life to resent those who had a more privileged background and a university education.

=== Trade union organiser ===
Shortly after his marriage on 27 April 1937 to Sophie Levene, daughter of Solomon Levene, a bookbinder, Brown was employed as a ledger clerk with the Transport and General Workers' Union, and appointed District Organiser for Watford the next year. By now Brown was active within the Labour Party and the Labour League of Youth. He stood as a moderate candidate for the Chairmanship but at the 1937 Labour Party conference he was defeated by a left-wing candidate, Ted Willis, later a writer for television. At the 1939 Party conference Brown made his mark by a strong speech demanding the expulsion of Stafford Cripps for his advocacy of a Popular Front. For the rest of Cripps's life he refused to speak to Brown.

Following the outbreak of the Second World War in September 1939, Brown volunteered for the Royal Air Force but Ernest Bevin, the Minister of Labour, kept Brown and other trade union officials in their civilian jobs. Bevin was one of the Labour leaders brought into the wartime coalition government. Brown himself served as a temporary civil servant in the Ministry of Agriculture from 1940 onwards.

== Early political career ==
=== Member of Parliament ===
As a TGWU official, Brown was an attractive candidate to Labour constituencies seeking a candidate, as the TGWU would sponsor him and pay election expenses. He was selected for Belper, a mixed constituency near Derby which was one of Labour's principal target seats. In the 1945 general election, Brown gained the seat from the Conservatives with a majority of 8,881. He was invited as one of a dozen 'Young Victors' to a private dinner given by Hugh Dalton on 30 July 1945 who was talent-spotting and networking. Brown was immediately chosen to be a parliamentary private secretary (PPS) by George Isaacs, who had followed the promoted Bevin as Minister of Labour, but his time with Isaacs was brief.

Brown was both adept at understanding political issues and how to communicate them, and convivial and generally popular within the Parliamentary Labour Party (save among the left-wing faction, whom he attacked as 'long-haired intellectuals'). He briefly worked as PPS for Chancellor of the Exchequer Hugh Dalton from April 1947, at a time when the economic situation of Britain had barely improved and the Chancellor needed the maximum political support. Brown launched an unsuccessful plot to have Clement Attlee replaced as Prime Minister by Ernest Bevin, although without consulting Bevin who did not approve.

=== Ministerial office ===
Attlee, despite knowing all about Brown's plot to depose him, swiftly appointed Brown as Joint Parliamentary Secretary to the Board of Agriculture and Fisheries. The Prime Minister had decided that it would be best if Brown were kept busy. At the Ministry of Agriculture, Brown worked to pass the Agriculture Act 1947 which provided price support to farmers and also to provide more arable land and ease shortages of machinery and foodstuffs. Government policy aimed at increasing food production so that rationing in the United Kingdom could be lifted but progress was slow; Attlee grew to appreciate his talent. When his mentor Bevin died in April 1951, Brown was appointed Minister of Works in the Cabinet reshuffle – at the head of a Ministry but not in the Cabinet. Brown inherited a long-running struggle by the Government to have the Tower of London open to tourists on Sunday and managed to solve it by outsmarting the Constable of the Tower in negotiations.

== Opposition ==
=== Election of 1951 ===
Brown ceased to be a minister when Labour lost the 1951 general election at the end of October. Like other Labour ex-ministers, Brown found himself forced to rely on an inadequate parliamentary salary; this led him to consider a return to being a trade union official. However, in 1953 he was hired as a consultant by the Mirror Group newspapers, enabling him to stay in politics.

Brown was a partisan participant in the Labour Party's internecine struggles in the early 1950s, opposing the Bevanite campaign. His natural campaigning ability became well-known, as did his tendency to be rude to those with whom he had disagreements. Shortly after the 1955 general election, Brown was elected to the Shadow cabinet for the first time; from that December, when his friend Hugh Gaitskell became Leader of the Labour Party, Brown found it easier to win promotion. Brown had a private but widely publicised shouting-match with Soviet leaders Nikita Khrushchev and Nikolai Bulganin when he was part of a Labour Party delegation invited to dine with them on their British visit in April 1956. In October that year, he lost the election for Treasurer of the Labour Party to Aneurin Bevan by 3,029,000 to 2,755,000 votes.

=== Deputy leadership ===
When Bevan died in July 1960, the Deputy Leadership of the Labour Party became vacant at a time when the Labour Party was severely divided over Clause IV of the party constitution. Brown was encouraged to stand as the candidate of the Gaitskellite right; the other candidates were left-winger Frederick Lee and the moderate but insufficiently senior James Callaghan. Brown was elected, beating Lee by 146 votes to 83 when Callaghan had been eliminated. Gaitskell as Leader and Brown as Deputy Leader were not viewed by most of the Labour left as a balanced ticket, and Brown was challenged for the job in both 1961, by Barbara Castle, and 1962, by Harold Wilson. Part of his job was to improve Labour's by-election campaigning, and he was successful in winning several, such as that at Middlesbrough West.

Gaitskell's sudden death in January 1963 made Brown's challenge for the party leadership inevitable. However, he mishandled the opening of his campaign. At the first Shadow Cabinet meeting after Gaitskell's death, Brown and his leadership rival Harold Wilson agreed to a clean fight. Wilson, who was accused by the right of undermining party unity, then informed the press that each agreed to serve under the other, which countered his reputation for plotting; Brown repudiated any such agreement, laying himself open to that accusation.

=== Personal problems ===
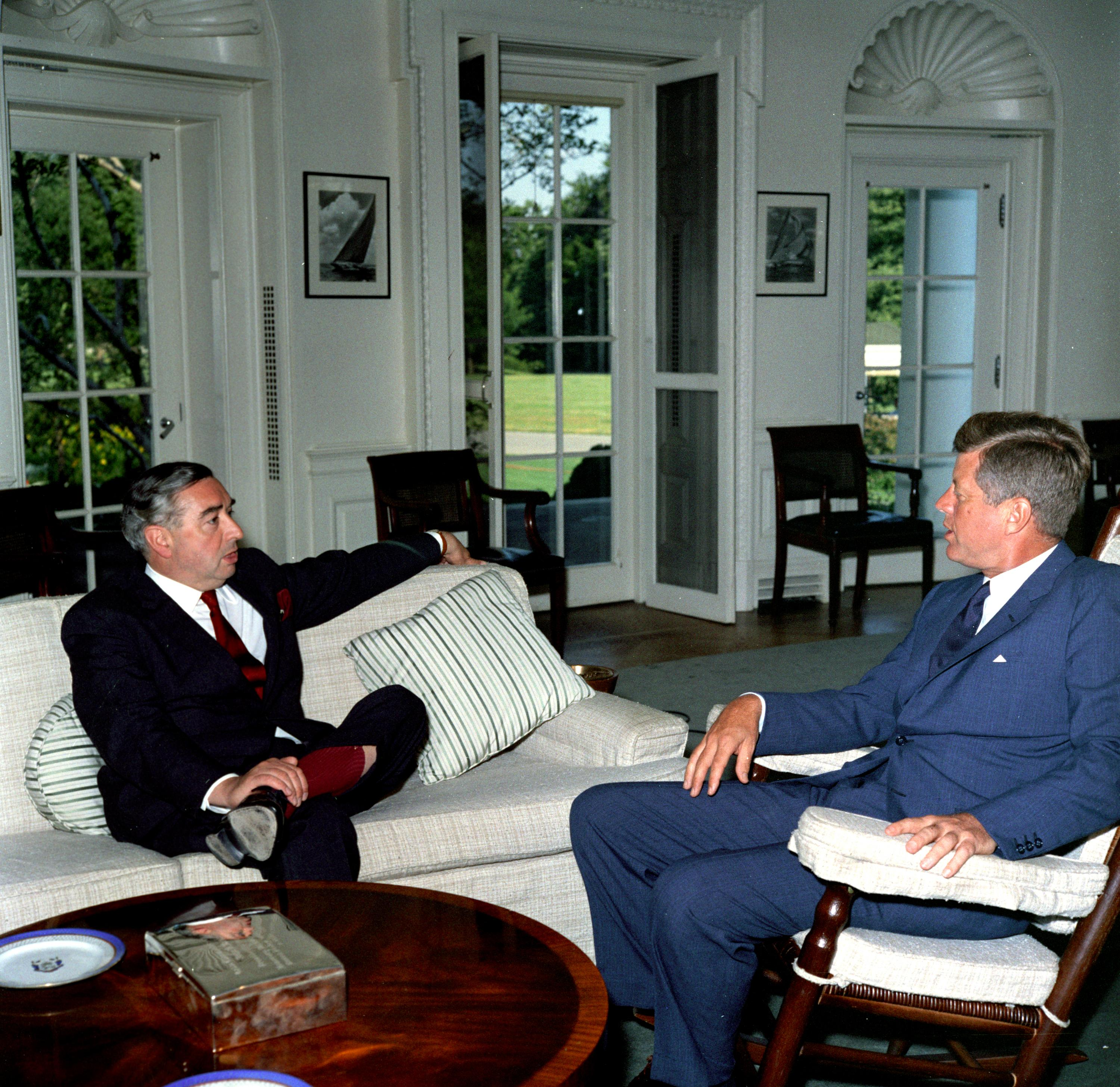
Brown in discussion with President John F. Kennedy in the Oval Office at the White House in July 1962

Many on the right of the Labour Party, including Anthony Crosland and Denis Healey, supported James Callaghan for the leadership. They were opposed to Wilson's being elected leader, but they had good reason not to trust Brown. Partly this was because of private knowledge of his excessive drinking, which exacerbated his rude and aggressive style of politics and originated the Private Eye euphemism for intoxication, "tired and emotional". Crosland called the leadership election "A choice between a crook [Wilson] and a drunk [Brown]." Many Labour MPs who were prepared to accept Brown as deputy leader were unhappy with the idea of his being in charge, and Wilson was easily elected. His colleague Roy Jenkins says that he was:

unenthusiastically but firmly for Brown ... Brown was certainly not a tepid character. He had great qualities both of intellect and personality, although they were balanced by appalling faults. He drank too much, particularly for his not very strong head ... And he confounded the trouble by being also capable of violent switches of mood, even when sober. On the big issues, he was almost invariably right and pursued his conviction with persistent courage.

The mainstream press had not publicised his drinking, but it later became apparent when Brown was invited on Associated-Rediffusion television to pay tribute to John F. Kennedy after his assassination (Brown was probably the closest Labour politician to Kennedy). Brown had come from a dinner in Shoreditch where he had already drunk a great deal, and drank more while preparing to go on air – having a row with actor Eli Wallach which became physical. When Brown went on air, millions of viewers saw him interpret a fair question as an accusation of his having overstated his closeness, then give a morose and slurred tribute from which it was apparent he was intoxicated. Brown had to issue a public apology.

Brown bitterly resented his leadership defeat, which came only weeks after he had defeated Wilson for the deputy leadership. He disappeared for five days after the result was declared, using an assumed name to book a flight to Glasgow; the newspapers were full of stories about the vanishing politician. When he returned he demanded of Wilson that he be appointed Shadow Foreign Secretary, which Wilson refused.

He retained the deputy leadership and despite his personal differences, played an important part in advising Wilson about Labour's campaign strategy in the 1964 general election. It was decided that Wilson would make only a limited number of major campaign speeches outside London, while Brown would tour the country speaking in all the marginal seats (his main theme was predicting an imminent economic crisis). Brown later calculated that he had made 100 speeches. In one he made a gaffe by suggesting that the mortgage interest rate could be cut to 3%; the Conservative Chancellor of the Exchequer Reginald Maudling was quick to capitalise on this and ask how much it would cost.

== Secretary of State for Economic Affairs ==
=== Department of Economic Affairs ===
Labour won the election with a small parliamentary majority in 1964. As previously arranged with Wilson, Brown was appointed to the newly created Department of Economic Affairs and Deputy Prime Minister in October 1964 through which they both hoped to institute long-term economic planning and remove some of the power of the Treasury.

Immediately on taking office Brown was told that the budget deficit for the coming year was forecast at £800 million, double what the Labour Party had predicted as the worst possible figure before the election. The leading economic ministers were presented with three options, including devaluation of the pound sterling, to meet the crisis. They decided on a temporary surcharge on imported goods. However, over the next few months Brown was persuaded by his deputy Anthony Crosland that ruling out devaluation had been a mistake. The pound continued to be under pressure in 1965 and Brown struggled over a 12-hour meeting at the Trades Union Congress to persuade the unions to accept a tougher prices and incomes policy, to which he was personally opposed.

The most important function of the DEA was to prepare a 'National Plan' for the economy. Brown became personally identified with the project, which helped increase enthusiasm for it among officials and the Labour Party, while also interesting the press. After nearly a year's work the Plan was unveiled on 16 September 1965, pledging to cover "all aspects of the country's development for the next five years". The Plan called for a 25% growth in Gross Domestic Product (GDP) from 1964 to 1970, which worked out at 3.8% annually. There were 39 specific actions listed, although many were criticised as vague.

=== July measures ===
Following the 1966 general election at which Labour won re-election with a parliamentary majority of 96, the government was hit by a severe financial crisis. The question of devaluation was raised again in a more pressing way, with Brown now strongly supporting it, but Harold Wilson was firmly opposed, preferring a set of deflationary measures including spending cuts and interest rate rises. Brown believed that these measures would damage the economy. Chancellor of the Exchequer James Callaghan found himself in the middle, as he opposed devaluation but felt that without prompt action it was inevitable. Wilson tried to keep Brown on board, even offering to make him Chancellor should Callaghan resign, but Brown stood firm. When the Cabinet voted by 17–6 against devaluation, Brown sent a letter of resignation.

Wilson craftily sent the letter back to Brown so that he could deny having received it, and then sent George Wigg to try to talk Brown out of it. This did not prevent the news reaching the public; Wigg then changed his position and told Brown that Wilson would accept his resignation. Bizarrely this convinced Brown to stay and he accepted all of Wilson's terms for staying in the government in a late night meeting before announcing his "un-resignation" to the press in Downing Street.

== Foreign Secretary ==
=== Move to Foreign Office ===
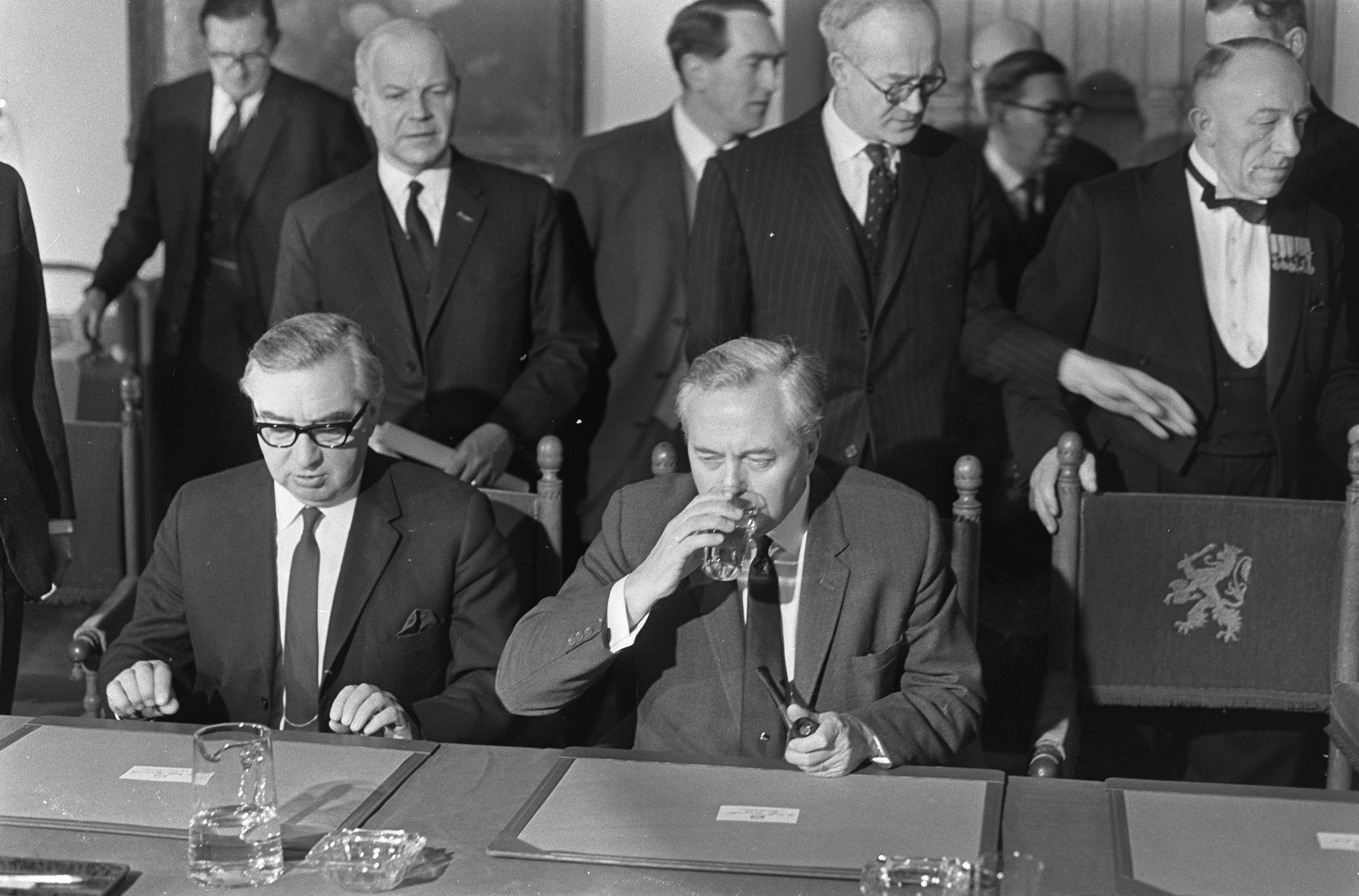
George Brown with Harold Wilson in 1967 at The Hague in the Netherlands

Brown was reshuffled to become Foreign Secretary in August 1966, a job he coveted. He was considered by some of his Cabinet colleagues not to have 'precisely the right temperament for the Foreign Office'. This decision had implications for the government's stance on the European Economic Community as Brown had always favoured entry. Wilson had been sceptical, but not opposed outright, to joining but Brown persuaded him and the rest of the Labour Party to support an application. In May 1967 it was announced that Britain had made its second application to join. Like the first, it was vetoed by Charles de Gaulle.

Brown's drinking became more pronounced as he became depressed by his loss of face in July 1966. His reaction to his depression was to launch vituperative attacks, for example at the son of newspaper proprietor Cecil King in October 1967. In 1968, he publicly insulted the wife of the British ambassador to France, Sir Patrick Reilly, at a dinner party at the French embassy in London, and later ended the ambassador's career over personal differences. After Wilson was told of the incident with King, Brown came round and told Wilson that he had just had a terrible row with his wife and could not continue in Government. More and more people were becoming aware of Brown's alcoholism, and Private Eye magazine managed to hint at the scandal with a parody of a memo titled "Brown: F.O. Acts". The memo gave translations into various languages for the words tired, overwrought, expansive, overworked, colourful and emotional, and coined the phrase "tired and emotional" as a euphemism for 'drunk'. A number of anecdotes recounting stories of his drunkenness circulated. The most well known was that, while drunk attending a formal function in Peru, he supposedly asked the Archbishop of Lima to dance with him, mistaking the Archbishop for a woman and not realising that the Peruvian national anthem was being played. The story is likely to be untrue as Brown did not visit South America during his term.

Brown, indeed, once boasted that "Many members of parliament drink and womanise – now, I've never womanised"; which was almost certainly true. There was never a whisper about his sex-life during his career.

=== Resignation ===
Despite devaluation in November 1967, the pound came again under severe pressure in March 1968. When Wilson wanted to declare an emergency bank holiday to give breathing space, he attempted to contact his Foreign Secretary. Brown could not be found. and his staff reported his condition as "only 'so-so' when last seen", and so Wilson convened a special meeting of the Privy Council without him. Brown was incensed that Wilson had not tried further to contact him, and got together with other ministers who had not been informed to face down Wilson at a meeting in the early hours of the morning. Brown, who appeared very drunk, incoherently shouted at Wilson, who was almost as angry and stood up for himself. At the end of the meeting Brown stormed out.

It was unclear whether he had resigned but Brown did nothing the next day to apologise. At six o'clock that evening he sent a letter which said "I think it better that we should part company" but did not mention "resignation". Wilson decided to reply by accepting Brown's resignation but also sent a message saying that Brown had half an hour to say whether the letter had been misinterpreted. Brown did not act on this and so left the government, but not in the blaze of glory for which he had hoped.

Brown’s resignation prompted sharp criticism from the Opposition, with Conservatives calling it evidence of governmental instability during a financial crisis, while some Liberal and Labour figures expressed regret but suggested his erratic conduct had become an embarrassment. In Washington the move was reportedly received with genuine regret, whereas European diplomatic reactions were more mixed, some regarding his departure as overdue.

In Cabinet papers released in 1999 it was clear that Wilson was in turmoil over Brown's resignation in 1968: seventeen drafts of his reply were written before finally accepting his resignation.

=== Defeat ===
Brown's constituency of Belper had undergone considerable development since he had been elected. Despite Labour's landslide victory in 1966, the seat swung towards the Conservatives. Most of the new housing was for middle class areas near Derby and contained mostly Conservative voters. Although a Boundary Commission report in 1969 recommended the abolition of the seat, the Government decided to postpone the changes and Brown was obliged to stand in a seat which was shifting away from his party. Added to this problem, he remained deputy leader of the Labour Party and toured the country making speeches for other Labour candidates during the 1970 general election. His Conservative opponent Geoffrey Stewart-Smith had spent the last four years nursing the Parliamentary constituency. Brown lost his seat by more than 2,000 votes.

In Brown's speech shortly after the result, he said that he would "lend" his constituency to the Conservatives.

== Later life ==
=== Life peerage ===
Brown swiftly decided not to try to regain his seat and received a life peerage in the Dissolution Honours List. When the award was announced, Brown told the press, "As I understand it, I have to pick a title – but I hope to everybody, I will simply remain George Brown." This foreshadowed a long dispute over the wording of the title. Brown wished to be "Lord George Brown", but Garter King of Arms argued that peerage titles traditionally included only surnames, not forenames. Brown had no sympathy with the objection, and noted that there had been counter-examples such as Lord Ritchie-Calder and Lord Francis-Williams. Also Field Marshal Sir Alan Brooke became Viscount Alanbrooke. Eventually, Garter King of Arms gave way on condition that Brown simultaneously change his surname to George-Brown, so finally his title ended as Baron George-Brown, of Jevington in the County of Sussex. In 1971, he published his memoirs, entitled In My Way. On hearing the title Harold Wilson supposedly commented that it was very appropriate, because that was just where he had always found George Brown over the years. He found work at the textile company Courtaulds, and later worked for Commercial Credit (Holdings) and British Northrop. He was also hired by the advertising agency, Fletcher Shelton Delaney, to make television commercials for P&O's Normandy Ferries.

On 2 March 1976, George-Brown announced that he was leaving the Labour Party in protest at government legislation which strengthened the closed shop. This announcement was overshadowed when he collapsed and fell into a gutter, having to be helped out by newspaper reporters, which was presumed to be a result of his drinking. The Times the next day printed the opinion that "Lord George-Brown drunk is a better man than the Prime Minister sober."

George-Brown was invited to deliver the 1978 Marlow (Scotland) Lecture to the Institution of Engineers and Shipbuilders in Scotland. He chose the subject "Britain's future: the significance of the European dimension".

George-Brown became the president of the Social Democratic Alliance in January 1981, and was a signatory to an advertisement in The Guardian on 5 February in support of the Limehouse Declaration. However, he did not announce his membership of the Social Democratic Party (SDP) for another four years. By that point, his reputation had so declined that Bill Rodgers, who had been Brown's parliamentary private secretary at the Department of the Secretary of State for Economic Affairs (DEA) and the Foreign Office, described him as "an embarrassment rather than an asset to his old friends who founded the SDP." His brother Ron, who had been a Labour MP since 1964, had also joined the party.

In 1978, George-Brown hired a young Canadian woman, Kathy Mason, as his personal secretary, and she worked for him until the spring of 1980. At that time, before returning to Canada, Mason trained the newly hired Maggie Haimes, then aged 31, to fill her position. Two years later, on 24 December 1982, after 45 years of marriage, Brown walked out on his wife and set up home with Haimes. He did not, however, change his 1969 will which gave his estate to Lady George-Brown.

=== Death ===
As his health deteriorated, George-Brown, an Anglo-Catholic Anglican, was received into the Roman Catholic faith. Suffering from cirrhosis, he died following a stroke on 2 June 1985 at the age of 70 at Duchy Hospital in Truro, Cornwall. He was cremated at Golders Green Crematorium in London, and his ashes were buried under a rose bush in the crematorium gardens. He was survived by his wife Sophie, Lady George-Brown (née Levene) (1911–1990), daughters Frieda and Pat, and mistress Margaret "Maggie" Haimes.

== Bibliography ==
- The National Plan (Cmnd. 2764). Department of Economic Affairs (HMSO, London, 1965)
- In my way: The political memoirs of Lord George-Brown by Lord George-Brown (Victor Gollancz, London, 1971)
- The Private Eye Story by Patrick Marnham (André Deutsch Ltd, London, 1982)
- Harold Wilson by Ben Pimlott (HarperCollins, London, 1992)
- Tired and Emotional: The life of George Brown by Peter Paterson (Chatto and Windus, London 1993)
- Dictionary of Labour Biography edited by Greg Rosen (Politico's Publishing, London, 2001)

Parliament of the United Kingdom
Preceded by Herbert Wragg	Member of Parliament for Belper; 1945–1970	Succeeded by Geoffrey Stewart-Smith
Political offices
Preceded by Richard Stokes	Minister of Works; 1951	Succeeded by David Eccles
Preceded by Hugh Gaitskell	Leader of the Opposition; 1963	Succeeded by Harold Wilson
Preceded by Rab Butler	First Secretary of State; 1964–1966	Succeeded by Michael Stewart
New post	Secretary of State for Economic Affairs; 1964–1966	Succeeded by Michael Stewart
Preceded by Michael Stewart	Foreign Secretary; 1966–1968	Succeeded by Michael Stewart
Party political offices
Preceded by Aneurin Bevan	Deputy Leader of the Labour Party; 1960–1970	Succeeded by Roy Jenkins
