= Terminological inexactitude =

Euphemism for dishonesty

Terminological inexactitude is a phrase introduced in 1906 by British politician Winston Churchill. It is used as a euphemism or circumlocution meaning a lie, an untruth, or a substantially correct but technically inaccurate statement.

Churchill first used the phrase following the 1906 election. Speaking in the House of Commons on 22 February 1906 as Under-Secretary of the Colonial Office, he had occasion to repeat what he had said during the campaign. When asked that day whether the Government was condoning slavery of Chinese labourers in the Transvaal, Churchill replied:

The conditions of the Transvaal ordinance ... cannot in the opinion of His Majesty's Government be classified as slavery; at least, that word in its full sense could not be applied without a risk of terminological inexactitude.

It has been used as a euphemism for a lie in the House of Commons, as to accuse another member of lying would be considered unparliamentary.

In more recent times, the term was used by Conservative MP Jacob Rees-Mogg to the Leader of the Opposition, Jeremy Corbyn over an accusation that Rees-Mogg's company had moved a hedge fund into the Eurozone despite his being in favour of Brexit.

== See also ==
- Economical with the truth
- Alternative facts
- Fake news
