= Mrs Dale's Diary =

British radio serial drama (1948–1969)

- Other names: The Dales (1962–1969)
- Genre: Soap opera, drama
- Running time: 15 minutes
- Country of origin: United Kingdom
- Language: English
- Home station: BBC Light Programme; BBC Radio 2
- Starring: Ellis Powell; Jessie Matthews
- Written by: Jonquil Anthony; Ted Willis
- Produced by: Antony Kearey; Betty Davies
- Recording studio: Broadcasting House
- Original release: 5 January 1948 – 25 April 1969
- No. of episodes: 5,431

Mrs Dale's Diary (known as The Dales from 1962 to 1969), is the first significant BBC Radio serial drama. It was first broadcast on 5 January 1948 on the BBC Light Programme, later BBC Radio 2, running until 25 April 1969. A new episode was broadcast each weekday afternoon, with a repeat the following morning. The programme revolved around a doctor's wife, the eponymous Mrs Dale, and her life in middle class suburbia with her husband, Dr Dale.

The main scriptwriter for many years was Jonquil Antony, and her first collaborator (under a pseudonym) was Ted Willis, later to create Dixon of Dock Green. Mrs Dale was played by Ellis Powell until she left the show in 1963, and was replaced by Jessie Matthews.

Popular with audiences, it became "a national institution", and the Queen Mother reportedly said of the programme, "It is the only way of knowing what goes on in a middle-class family."

== History ==
An innovative characteristic of the programme was that a brief introductory narrative in each episode was spoken by Mrs Dale as if she were writing her diary. The original harp theme was by Marie Goossens. The programme was broadcast at 4.15 pm.

The serial centred on Mrs Mary Dale, a doctor's wife, and her husband Jim, and the comings and goings of a middle class society. The Dales lived at Virginia Lodge in the fictional London Metro-land-style suburb of Parkwood Hill (said to be based on Pinner, Middlesex, or Sutton, Surrey). They had moved there from the real area of Kenton, which now straddles the border between the London boroughs of Brent and Harrow. Later in the series, to modernise the programme and its setting, the producers relocated the family to the fictional new town of Exton New Town.

Mrs Dale's mother was Mrs Rosemary Freeman, whom Jim always called, rather gravely, "mother-in-law". Dr and Mrs Dale had a daughter, Gwen, and a son, Bob, who worked in the motor trade. He was married to Jenny; they had twins. Gwen was widowed after her husband David was killed in a water-skiing accident in the Bahamas where he was holidaying with his rich mistress. Mary Dale's sister, Sally (which she always pronounced "Selly"), lived in Chelsea and moved in exotic circles. The Dales and their friends (along with Captain, Mrs Freeman's cat, apparently named after the rank of her late husband, who had been killed in the First World War) got along in almost perfect harmony. It was all respectable, comfortable and middle-class.

=== Treatment of homosexuality ===
The programme is thought to be the first British mainstream drama which depicted a character known to be homosexual sympathetically in a leading part: Richard Fulton (portrayed by David March), Sally's husband. At this time, homosexuality was still illegal in the United Kingdom. However, though he was apparently based on the homosexual writer Patrick White, Richard's history in the serial was heterosexual. He was, in fact, a character who had developed a lot, having been presented in the early days as a monster of petulance.

=== Changes to the format ===
On 26 February 1962, the serial was renamed The Dales. The linking narratives by Mrs Dale were dropped. The reason was that the BBC was conscious that the series was considered by the media to be twee and hopelessly old fashioned. The changes included a new theme tune composed by Ron Grainer, composer of the theme music for Doctor Who. "Dance in the Twilight" from Eric Coates' Springtime Suite also served as a signature tune for a time.

Jessie Matthews' biographer, Michael Thornton, later wrote:

On 19th February, 1963, a plump and embittered fifty-six-year-old character actress called Ellis Powell walked out of Broadcasting House for the last time. She was not a star. In fact she had earned less than £30 a week. But her voice was as well-known in Britain as that of Queen Elizabeth II, for it was heard twice a day by seven million devoted listeners.
Miss Powell was Britain's most sacrosanct fictional paragon, Mrs. Dale, in the radio serial 'The Dales'. And now, after fifteen years in the role she had created, the B.B.C. had summarily fired her – partly because of her drinking habits, and partly because it was felt that the role, and also the entire programme, was in need of a facelift.

Thornton added:

Three months later, at the age of fifty-seven, she died in the National Temperance Hospital. The official cause of death was a cerebral haemorrhage, but her friends believed that she never recovered from the shock and distress of her summary dismissal by the B.B.C.
In the last weeks of her life she worked as a demonstrator at the Ideal Home Exhibition and as a cleaner in an hotel. She left only £15 6s., having carried around in her handbag for weeks a cheque for £600 – her pay-off from the B.B.C. She had never put it into her bank because she feared the money would be swallowed up by her overdraft.

On 7 March 1963, the news broke that Matthews would be playing Mrs Dale. The first episode featuring Matthews was recorded on 11 March, and transmitted on 18 March. She appeared in the programme until it ended, although suffered several periods of ill health, resulting in her role being temporarily recast. Matthews was off for six weeks in September and October 1963, during which Mrs Dale was played by former Coronation Street actress Noel Dyson. In October 1966, the BBC announced that Matthews was ill, and would be out of the programme for at least a month. This time, Ruth Dunning replaced her. Dunning also stepped into the role when Matthews was off-air for nine weeks, in an illness-related break which lasted from March to May 1967.

=== The Dales ===
In its last years, The Dales became more sensational. Mrs Dale became a councillor, a position she had to give up after she had caused a man's death by careless driving. A heart attack forced Dr Dale to retire from practice. Perhaps the most famous storyline was Jenny getting measles; listeners wrote in their thousands complaining that she had already had measles in 1949.

When it became The Dales, the show did try to copy The Archers, which was originally a medium to disseminate information to the agricultural community, and to give an insight into rural affairs to the public. In The Dales the plots now revolved around medical conditions and problems. When the series ran a story about the importance of women having regular cervical smear tests and checking their breasts for lumps, the junior health minister praised the programme, saying it had encouraged thousands of women to see their doctor.

The serial ran for 5,431 episodes, culminating with the engagement of Mrs Dale's daughter Gwen to a famous television professor on 25 April 1969 (recorded on 16 April 1969). On the news of its demise, Liberal MP Peter Bessell attempted to introduce a reprieve for the series in Parliament, and there was a campaign to save the programme. However, while listening figures had peaked at six and seven million in the early 1960s, the average audience was 5.2m by September 1967, and 3.7m by 1969. The last episode drew four million listeners.

The BBC Sound Archive holds only five complete episodes of Mrs Dale's Diary, and seven complete episodes of The Dales.

A few days after the final episode, a new serial drama, Waggoners' Walk, took over the time slot.

In January 2012, BBC Radio 4 broadcast I'm Rather Worried about Jim, a documentary telling the story of the series, presented by Penelope Keith.

== Cast ==
- Ellis Powell, Jessie Matthews, Noel Dyson, Ruth Dunning as Mrs. Mary Dale
- Douglas Burbidge, James Dale, Charles Simon as Dr Jim Dale
- Hugh Latimer, Leslie Heritage, Nicholas Parsons, Derek Hart as Bob Dale
- Julia Braddock, Shirley Dixon, Mary Steele, Sheila Sweet as Jenny Dale
- Virginia Hewitt, Joan Newell, Beryl Calder, Aline Waites as Gwen Dale/Owen
- Anthony James, Frank Partington, Gordon Morrison, John Spingett, Robin Lloyd, Lee Peters as David Owen
- Courtney Hope, Dorothy Lane as Mrs. Freeman (Mrs. Dale's mother)
- Thelma Hughes, Margaret Ward as Sally Lane (Mrs. Dale's sister)
- Thea Wells as Isobelle Fielding
- Vivienne Chatterton as Mrs. Mountford
- Jack Howarth as Mr. Maggs
- Grace Allardyce as Mrs. Morgan/Maggs
- Hattie Jacques as Mrs. Leathers
- Charles Lamb as Monument (the gardener)
- Michael Harding as Milkman
- Robert Lankesheer as Leamington Sparr

== Spin-offs ==
Over the years it ran, there were a number of books written around the characters, several authored in whole or part by Jonquil Antony, the most important scriptwriter at the beginning and for many years. In 1970, the year after the programme finished, she took back her former characters after a fashion, publishing Dear Dr. Dale, a novel set after the end of the serial.

In the same year, Charles Simon, who had played Dr Dale in the Jessie Matthews era, did his own continuation of the story, going on tour in At Home With The Dales. This show has its place in theatre history as the first professional venture of Cameron Mackintosh, later renowned for large-scale musicals. The play was written by Charles Henry, who was soon discovered to be Simon. Later dates in the tour were cancelled because the audience did not seem to be there. "It would have been different if Jessie had done the tour", Simon remarked a few months later (to actor Roger Sansom, with whom he was in a broadcast). He was, however, the only member of the radio cast to make the transition.

The play was published, but has seldom been revived. In 1972, it received an amateur production at Rugby Theatre, with Bridget Watson as Mrs Dale and Harry Roberts as her husband the doctor. The only professional revival appears to have been in 1997 at the Kenneth More Studio Theatre in Ilford, when Angela Ellis and Roger Braban played the senior Dales.

== Catchphrase ==
The phrase seized on by caricaturists as typical of Mrs Dale's narrative was "I'm rather worried about Jim...". Indeed, the phrase was a staple of many comedy programmes, radio and television, in the early 1960s aiming to poke fun at safe, staid and undemanding middle-class lifestyles. The last episode ended with Mrs Dale saying, "There's one thing that won't change – I shall always worry about Jim...".

== Parodies ==
=== Mrs Wilson's Diary ===
Mrs Dale's Diary was the inspiration for Mrs Wilson's Diary in the fortnightly satirical magazine Private Eye. The writers (primarily John Wells) portrayed Mrs Wilson (the wife of prime minister Harold Wilson) as seeing herself as comfortably middle class, in contrast to the working class pretensions (and middle class actuality) of her husband: for example, with the Wincarnis (a brand of tonic wine) and the worsted suits with two pairs of trousers (Wilson was from Huddersfield, a town known for the manufacture of worsted cloth).

=== The Goon Show ===
The show was mentioned in the following episodes of The Goon Show:

- In an untitled episode (series 2, episode 1: 22 January 1952), listeners are given an example of how Mrs Dale's Diary would sound as produced by Americans. It includes over-hyped music, multiple in-show advertisements for bizarrely named products, and ends with several murders.
- In "The Man Who Tried To Destroy London's Monuments", (series 4, episode 2: 9 October 1953), Eccles regains consciousness and is told he is in Mrs Dale's Diary.
- "Nineteen Eighty-Five", (series 5, episode 15: 5 January 1955), in which mention is made of Mrs Dale's Real Diary, when the character Bluebottle is reading a book:

Seagoon: I want to read it. What's it called?
Bluebottle: It's called Mrs Dale's Real Diary.
Seagoon: Mrs Dale's...?? Heavens — would the BBC stop at nothing? So this was how they kept the masses from thinking.
Bluebottle: Eheehee! Look at this page! Eheehee! It's a Three-D picture of Mrs Dale in her nightshirt being chased by Richard Dimbleby... Eheehee! Eheeheehee! Eheeheeoooooughhhh... pauses to wipe drool off chin.

It was also one of the recordings used for torture in the BBC Listening Room, that episode's parody of Room 101.

- "The History of Pliny the Elder" (series 7, episode 25: 28 March 1957):

Seagoon: Fear not! We shall fight them up hill and down Mrs Dale!

=== Round the Horne ===
- The programme was often a 'target' (albeit an affectionate one) on the BBC Radio comedy Round the Horne, referred to as "Mrs Dire's Dreary", with the part of Mrs Dire being played by Kenneth Williams.

== Published references ==
- Mrs Dale's Diary: Gwen's Love Story (No writer given) Pub:Chambers, 1951
- BBC Year Book For 1952 Pub: British Broadcasting Corporation 1951
- Mrs Dale At Home Jonquil Antony Pub: Macdonald, London, 1952
- Mrs Dale Jonquil Antony & Robert Turley Pub: The World's Work 1958
- The Dales of Parkwood Hill Jonquil Antony & Robert Turley Pub: The World's Work 1959
- Mrs Dale's Friendship Book Jonquil Antony Pub: Arlington Books 1961
- The Dales Rex Edwards Pub: British Broadcasting Corporation 1969
- Dear Dr Dale Jonquil Antony Pub: Corgi 1970
- Pulling Faces For A Living James Dale Pub: Victor Gollancz 1970
- At Home With The Dales Charles Simon Pub: Samuel French 1971
- Evening All: Fifty Years Over A Hot Typewriter Ted Willis Pub: Macmillan 1991
- Broadcasting It Keith Howes Pub: Cassell 1993
