= Anyone for tennis? (disambiguation) =

"Anyone for tennis?" (also "Tennis, anyone?") is an English-language idiom. Other uses include:

- "Anyone for Tennis", a song by the British rock band Cream
- Anyone For Tennis?, an Australian comedy band
- "Tennis, Anyone?", an episode of the American television situation comedy The Jeffersons
- "Tennis Anyone?", an episode of the British television situation comedy Kim's Convenience

== See also ==
- Anyone for Denis? (disambiguation)
- Anyone for Tennyson?
- Tennis
