= Private Eye recordings =

Private Eye, the British fortnightly satirical magazine, has produced various comedic audio recordings since its founding in 1961.

The most famous of the recordings from the 1960s and 1970s were pressed on thin floppy 7" vinyl (sometimes known as "flexi-discs" or "flimsies") and they were distributed as "cover-mounts" attached to the front cover of the magazine, which for those issues doubled its price to cover the costs of the recordings. The discs were played at a phonogram speed of either 33 1/3 rpm or 45 rpm and had a duration of approximately 6 minutes.

Private Eye also recorded material released on other configurations including 7" vinyl singles, EPs, 12" vinyl albums, audio-cassettes and compact disc.

The content for the recordings was written and performed by Private Eye staff members, contributors and friends. Among those prominently featured on the classic 1960s and 1970s recordings were: Peter Cook, Dudley Moore, Barry Humphries, John Bird, John Wells, Eleanor Bron, William Rushton, Barry Fantoni and Richard Ingrams.

In addition to their original releases, some of the recordings have been reissued on vinyl and audio-cassette.

== Discography ==
=== 7" flexi-discs released as "cover-mounts" ===
- His Master's Vass – Issued: 2 October 1964. Themed around the upcoming October 1964 UK general election
  Notes: His Master's Voice is an entertainment trademark used for music equipment, recording and retailing, "Baillie Vass" was the magazine's nickname for the then Prime Minister Sir Alec Douglas-Home
- I Saw Daddy Kissing Santa Claus – Issued: 18 December 1964. A Christmas-themed recording
  Notes: The title was a play on the well-known Christmas song "I Saw Mommy Kissing Santa Claus"
- The Rites of Spring – Issued: 1 April 1965
- BBC Gnome Service – Issued: 23 December 1966. A Christmas-themed recording. (Label & Catalogue number: Lyntone LYN 1138)
  Notes: The title was a play on the name of the BBC Home Service – the speech-oriented BBC radio network prior to the launch of Radio 4; Lord Gnome is the name of the fictional press-baron who supposedly owns Private Eye
- Abominable Radio Gnome – Issued: 8 December 1967. A Christmas-themed recording. (Label & Catalogue number: Lyntone LYN 1354).
  Notes: The title plays off a jingle for the then recently launched BBC Radio 1 station which had dubbed itself "Wonderful Radio 1"
- The Loneliness of the Long Playing Record – Issued: 14 February 1969. (Label & Catalogue number: Lyntone LYN 1677)
- Dear Sir, is This A Record? – Issued: 5 December 1969. A Christmas-themed recording. (Label & Catalogue number: Lyntone LYN 1962)
- Just For The Record – Issued: 4 December 1970. A Christmas-themed recording. (Label & Catalogue number: Lyntone LYN 2140)
- Hullo Sailor – Issued: 1 December 1972. A Christmas-themed recording. (Label & Catalogue number: Lyntone LYN 2558)
- Farginson – Issued: 21 March 1975. (Label & Catalogue number: Lyntone LYN 3034)
- The Sound of Talbot – Issued: 5 December 1980. A Christmas-themed recording
  Notes A parody of Sir James Goldsmith's short-lived 'Now' Magazine – dubbed "Talbot" by Private Eye.
- Record Damages – Issued: 11 December 1987 A Christmas-themed recording
- Skeye Flexi-Dish – Issued: 1 April 1989
  Notes: Parody of Rupert Murdoch's recently launched Sky TV service.

=== 7" vinyl singles and E.P.s ===
- Private Eye Sings Private Eye – 7" E.P. Issued: 1962. (Label & Catalogue number: Artists & Repertoire ARP 1212)
  Notes: a multi-track E.P. included a trick recording of then Prime Minister Harold MacMillan appearing to sing a pop song
- Neasden – 7" single. Issued: 1972. (Label & Catalogue number: Spark SRL 1059).
  Notes: A comedy song written by Barry Fantoni and Willie Rushton, featuring Willie Rushton and John Wells with musical comedy group The Alberts. B-side of the single was a comedic arrangement of Schubert's "The Trout" by John Wells.

=== 12" vinyl albums ===
- Private Eye's Blue Record – 12" album, Issued: 1965. (Label & Catalogue number: Transatlantic Records. TRA 131)
  Notes: a multi-track album featuring spoken word skits and songs
- Ho-Ho Very Satirical! – 12" album, Recorded 1971 but not issued. (Eventually released on audio-cassette in 1998.)
  Notes: album recorded in 1971 but turned down by record companies because it was considered too controversial.

=== Compact Discs ===
- Private Eye's CD-ROMP – Issued: 2001
  Notes: issued to coincide with the 40th Anniversary of Private Eye. Performed by Eleanor Bron, Jon Culshaw, Harry Enfield, Ian Hislop, Barry Humphries, Lewis MacLeod, Kate Robbins, John Sessions, and written by regular contributors to the magazine.

== Reissues ==
In 1973, Private Eye pressed a limited edition 12" vinyl album titled Private Eye's Golden Years of Sound – containing its first eight flexi-discs. The album was for private circulation only among friends and it was never commercially released.

In 1980, comedy producer Martin Lewis, a longtime associate and friend of Private Eye owner Peter Cook acquired exclusive rights to all the Private Eye recordings produced from 1962–1980 and arranged for the commercial release of the first ten flexi-discs on a 12" vinyl album to coincide with the 20th anniversary of Private Eye magazine in October 1981. The album – titled Private Eye Presents Golden Satiricals [The Top Ten Flexi-Discs!] was released on Lewis' Springtime Records label, distributed by Island Records. The release included a facsimile of the first-ever issue of Private Eye.

In 1998, the flexi-discs album was reissued by Springtime Records as a double audio-cassette set distributed by MCI (Music Collection International) – with the 1962 E.P. "Private Eye Sings Private Eye" as bonus content. At the same time, Springtime also reissued the 1965 album "Private Eye's Blue Record" and gave the first-ever release to the unissued 1971 album "Ho-Ho Very Satirical!" as companion releases to the flexi-discs reissue. The three releases were sub-titled Volumes One, Two and Three respectively. All three releases were on audio-cassette only.

A takeover of MCI's parent company VCI by the Kingfisher Group shortly before the release date led to a corporate restructuring of MCI and the closing of the label's comedy division. This resulted in the release of the three Private Eye audio cassette being effectively still-born and very few copies were distributed – making copies hard to find. The cassettes sell for a premium on auction sites such as eBay.

A promotional CD compilation was issued with the Guardian newspaper in 2011, the first and (as at 2015) only digital release of any of the pre-2000 tracks.

- Private Eye's Golden Years of Sound – Issued: 1973 (private release only) (Label & Catalogue number: Lyntone LYN 2745/6)
  Notes: Private limited edition release of 12" vinyl album containing the first eight flexi-discs (see above)
- Private Eye Presents Golden Satiricals [The Top Ten Flexi-Discs!] – Issued: 1981. (Label & Catalogue number: Springtime Records. HAHA 6002)
  Notes: Commercial release of 12" vinyl album containing the first ten flexi-discs (see above). Released to celebrate 20th anniversary of Private Eye
- The Best Of Private Eye: Golden Satiricals Presents Volume One: The Famous Flexies! – Issued: 1998. Springtime/MCI. Audio-cassette only.
  Notes: Reissue on audio-cassette of the 1981 "Golden Satiricals" album (very limited distribution).
- The Best Of Private Eye: Golden Satiricals Presents Volume Two: The Swingeing Sixties – Issued: 1998. Springtime/MCI. Audio-cassette only.
  Notes: Reissue on audio-cassette of the 1965 "Private Eye's Blue Record" album (very limited distribution).
- The Best Of Private Eye: Golden Satiricals Presents Volume Three: The Sarcastic Seventies – Issued: 1998. Springtime/MCI. Audio-cassette only.
  Notes: First-ever release of the previously-unreleased 1971 album "Ho Ho Very Satirical!" (very limited distribution).
- Highlights From Private Eye's Legendary Comedy Recordings – Issued: 2011. Guardian newspaper free CD.
  Notes: Given free with the Guardian newspaper on 5 November 2011. Compilation of tracks from the 7" and 12" discs, including some from the 'unreleased' LP and Neasden single
