= Hilary Lowinger =

British clothes designer (1944–2023)

- Born: Hilary Rosalind Hannah; 23 July 1944; Calcutta, British India
- Died: 26 July 2023 (aged 79)
- Education: Red Gables, Carlisle
- Employer: Private Eye

Hilary Rosalind Lowinger née Hannah (23 July 1944 – 26 July 2023) was a British clothes designer, occupational therapist and receptionist.

== Early life and family ==
Born in Calcutta in 1944 to John Hannah, a director at the Metal Box Company, and Eulalia Hannah (née Abrahams), Hilary moved with her family to Tanganyika (now part of Tanzania). She attended Red Gables, Carlisle for her schooling, while her brother, Howard, was enrolled at Fettes in Edinburgh.

After completing her education at an art college, Lowinger briefly worked in fashion design. Later, on a train journey to Nottingham, she met Ernie Lowinger, an architect. They had two children: Boris, who became an animator for a video game company, and Harriett, who took a role as a project manager in a tech firm.
