= Not Private Eye =

One-off parody of the British satirical magazine Private Eye

- Editor: John Penrose
- Categories: Parody, satirical magazine
- Publisher: Robert Maxwell
- First issue: December 1986

Not Private Eye was a one-off parody of the British satirical magazine Private Eye.

== Overview ==
The spoof of Private Eye was published in December 1986 by Robert Maxwell, to celebrate his £55,000 libel victory over Private Eye caused by the magazine's accusation of attempted cash for peerages. It was printed using the facilities of the Daily Mirror, of which Maxwell was the owner.

Private Eye, meanwhile, was trying to sell a Christmas edition (at £1 rather than the then-usual 45p) in order to cover the costs of the libel case, estimated at £255,000. W H Smith was refusing to stock it. During this time Peter Cook led a "raid" on the Mirror offices which, according to Ian Hislop, he began by sending a crate of whisky to the people working on Not Private Eye, guessing that it was a task they would prefer not to be doing. The group then successfully entered the Mirror offices, removed the proof copy of Not Private Eye, drank champagne in Maxwell's office and were eventually removed by security after they phoned up Maxwell in New York City.

== Content ==
The spoof edition largely copied the style of Private Eye but attacked its editorial team, including a cover which portrayed the editor Richard Ingrams in a Nazi uniform talking to Adolf Hitler. The speech bubble said "And if anyone objects, we say we were only doing it for a laugh".

Another example of such anti-Private Eye humour was included in the cartoon strips, one of which, entitled "Carlisle St, an everyday tale of libelling folk", featured caricatures of the Private Eye team making attacks against others as a means of making money.

The cover of Not Private Eye also featured an altered version of Private Eye mascot Gnitty, who was shown to be facing the wrong way (compared to his usual pose on the Private Eye cover) and was smiling.
