= Anyone for Denis? (video) =

1982 film directed by Dick Clement

Anyone for Denis? is a British video-taped television version of the stage play of the same name broadcast by the ITV network on 28 December 1982. The original play, first performed at the Whitehall Theatre in 1981, was written by satirist John Wells.

It is based on Private Eye's 'Dear Bill' letters, purportedly written by Denis Thatcher, the husband of Margaret Thatcher, the prime minister at the time. Set in Chequers, the play parodies the couple's relationship. The title is a punning reference to the more familiar question "Anyone for tennis?"

The television production, for Thames Television, was directed by Dick Clement and stars John Wells, Angela Thorne, John Cater and Nicky Henson.

== Plot ==
Chequers. Denis Thatcher, idiotic consort of Britain's first female prime minister, is far too drunk to notice that one of his domestic staff, Boris, is a Russian spy who has installed listening devices in the daffodils. Much more serious to him is that the Rear Admiral who is his housekeeper has locked the drinks cabinet and hidden the key. While his wife is in Brussels negotiating a rebate from the heads of the EEC, Denis invites his golfing and drinking cronies, the Major and Maurice Picarda, to the PM's official residence for a weekend of festivities. Unfortunately, Margaret returns unexpectedly, having invited the French, German and American envoys to the house.

Despite their extreme intoxication, Denis's two pals somehow make it into the grounds of Chequers, leaving a crashed car behind and with the Thatchers' security detail in hot pursuit. US envoy Hamilton Thisp arrives but Eric, the Thatchers' enthusiastically violent Special Branch man, knocks him unconscious, thinking he's one of the intruders. When the Thatchers encounter Maurice and the Major, Denis, always terrified of incurring his wife's displeasure, disclaims all knowledge of them, but the PM thinks the two intruders are foreign envoys, partly because they're too drunk to be comprehensible, and takes them into the conference room. Word then reaches Eric that the actual German and French envoys have arrived: he detains Maurice and the Major on suspicion of being terrorists.

As the domestic staff are all on strike, Margaret orders Denis to wait on the envoys. The Major tries to escape the house by shinning down a drainpipe, but finds police dogs waiting for him and thinks better of it. Thisp has regained consciousness and goes on the loose, but Eric apprehends him again, still convinced he's a drunk driver, and insists he provide a urine sample. Vouvray, the French envoy, is fascinated by Margaret and wants closer European integration. He finds Denis, lying underneath the drinks cabinet and trying to drill through the bottom. Vouvray promises him alcohol in exchange for 'one moment alone' with Margaret. Thisp enters with a full beaker; Vouvray presents Denis with this. He tells Margaret to meet him at the bottom of the garden, exits the house and is savaged by guard dogs.

Schubert, the German, is also fascinated by Margaret; while enthusiastically talking about involving her in his plans for world domination, he sets aside his spectacles. Meanwhile, his trousers irretrievably ruined, the Major puts on one of Margaret's costumes as part of a plan to escape the house. Schubert mistakes him for the real thing. Now badly concussed, Thisp takes a polaroid of the couple, thinking Schubert is Denis and the Major is Margaret. Schubert tells the Major to meet him at the bottom of the garden, exits the house and is also savaged by guard dogs.

Denis re-enters, having ordered a limousine for his friends to escape in; Thisp wants another photo, which Denis and the Major pose for. Denis exits to fetch the limousine, but Margaret re-enters, causing the Major to hide in the cubbyhole where Boris transmits to Moscow. Denis re-enters, and Thisp finally gets his photo of the real couple. The Major exits from Boris's hiding-place and Margaret sees him. Picarda enters, also wearing one of Margaret's costumes. The two take advantage of Margaret's astonishment to walk out to their waiting limousine, as Denis tells his wife with dignity that these are his closest friends. Margaret, intrigued by a side of Denis she had never suspected, tells him she will be waiting upstairs. Denis flees in abject terror.

== Cast ==
- John Wells as Denis Thatcher
- Angela Thorne as Margaret Thatcher
- John Cater as Maurice Picarda
- Nicky Henson as Vouvray
- Mark Kingston as Hamilton Thisp
- Roy Kinnear as Boris
- Alfred Molina as Eric Catchpole
- John Nettleton as Roy Jenkins
- Terence Rigby as Major
- Joan Sanderson as Rear Admiral
- Robert Stephens as Schubert

== Background ==
=== Stage play ===
Producers Dick Clement and Robert Fox approached John Wells about turning his "Dear Bill" columns for Private Eye into a stage show, as had previously happened successfully with Wells's columns about another prime ministerial spouse, Mrs Wilson's Diary. Wells's collaborator on the columns, Richard Ingrams, dropped out of the writing process after initial involvement, but contributed the title and the idea that the action should take place at Chequers. Throughout the writing and rehearsal process, Wells updated the play with topical jokes, such as introducing Roy Jenkins as the Thatchers' butler. (Note: The former Labour minister had returned to British politics after a spell as President of the European Commission, announcing the formation of the SDP in March 1981, and for a time was considered a major political figure.) The play opened at the Whitehall Theatre on 7 May 1981, with Clement directing. It ran until the following May. Wells continued to make changes to the script as the run progressed, to keep it topical, (Note: William Whitelaw, a major character when the play began its run, was cut when Wells decided the Home Secretary had become "an old bore who wasn't pulling his weight" in Cabinet. In January 1982, Wells added jokes about Mark Thatcher's disappearance in the Sahara, then cut them when the Prime Minister showed signs of public distress about her missing son. In March 1982, dialogue had to be added for the actor playing Roy Jenkins, following Jenkins's success at the Hillhead by-election.) though he found it impossible to think of any about the Falklands War. A review of the published script calls the play "a wild success"; after the run had ended, Wells told an interviewer, "For the first time that I can remember I didn't have a bank overdraft."

The Thatchers' daughter Carol reviewed an early performance for The News of the World and condemned the play, claiming it was not a fair portrait of her father. Nonetheless, following a conversation with Carol, the prime minister changed her position on seeing the play and attended a gala performance, (Note: Carol Thatcher says this was the idea of Robert Fox, the producer, and her mother's adviser Timothy Bell, who claimed that it would show she was "a good sport". Thatcher's former strategist Gordon Reece said he encouraged her to attend, seeing the gala "as an occasion in which the Prime Minister, in the midst of trouble, could show that she still has a sense of humour".) on 12 July, to raise money for her two favourite charities, the NSPCC and Jimmy Savile's appeal for Stoke Mandeville Hospital. Privately she and Denis both found it offensive, particularly a scene where he mistakes a urine sample for some whisky, but publicly she called it "most amusing" and "Marvellous farce". After the performance, the cast attended a drinks party at 10 Downing Street, and Wells found the real Denis Thatcher to be not the loveable buffoon of the play: "Very beady, sharp dresser, humourless and rather hard". (Note: Wells also claimed that Thatcher used racial slurs when discussing the recent riots. Carol Thatcher does not deny this, calling it "vintage Denis".) When he changed his characterisation accordingly, "Angela Thorne, who played Mrs T, said that if I went on playing him like that I'd empty the theatre, so I went back to the capering".

=== Politics ===
When the play began its theatrical run, Thatcher had been the most unpopular British prime minister since polling began; according to an opinion poll published that year, only 23% of voters thought she was doing a good job. By the end of 1980, 2.8 million Britons were unemployed, and by 1982 this would reach 3 million. She was expected by many not to remain long in the role. This was reflected in several reviews. Michael Billington concluded his in The Guardian by saying, "Satire may well be what closes on Saturday night: but this kind of broad political farce could well see out the present government." Arthur Thirkell similarly signed off his Daily Mirror piece with: "it should run longer than that similar-in-style production staged nightly just down the road at Number Ten." In April and July 1981, severe rioting broke out in Brixton, Toxteth and other urban areas, and was blamed on high unemployment and racial tensions. The play's gala performance coincided with the Toxteth riot, and Wells later told a journalist that having the Thatchers attend was "a bit like entertaining Nero while Rome burned". As its run ended, however, her fortunes had reversed dramatically. By July 1982 her approval ratings had doubled from the previous year, and Herbert Kretzmer wrote in his review of the TV version that the play "ran at the Whitehall until the Falklands War made it no longer funny to laugh at Mrs Thatcher".

== Production ==
In addition to Wells and Thorne, John Nettleton, John Cater and Joan Sanderson reprised their roles for the televised version. Wells told the press that the cast had been "enhanced" by the addition of Robert Stephens, Nicky Henson, Roy Kinnear, Terence Rigby and Mark Kingston; the cast of the stage version had performed much doubling of parts. The Sunday Telegraph reported in August 1982 that the small-screen version had just finished shooting, though in December its sister paper The Daily Telegraph claimed that it had been "recorded only a few days before transmission to ensure topicality". It was broadcast by ITV at 8:45pm on 28 December 1982.

== Reception ==
Reviewing the broadcast in The Telegraph the following day, Richard Last called it "the funniest bit of television seen this Christmas":

"Anyone for Denis?" by John Wells out of "Private Eye," came up like a bottle of vintage port which has stood for exactly the right amount of time in the cellar. The characterisations and the farcical style had been matured to near perfection. You had to remain pretty sharply on the alert to appreciate the full bouquet, for the political allusions and the laughs flew at a speed which left no time for recovery if you missed them on the wing.

He particularly praised "a tour de force by Angela Thorne, who has the PM's mannerisms off to the smallest speech inflexion and the way she clutches her handbag", and summed up: "I am not sure whether it is respectful to treat our leaders thus, but dear me, it does make life easier to bear".

In The Daily Mail, Herbert Kretzmer was also positive if slightly cooler: "It is to Mr Wells' credit that he has given his farce the kind of convoluted construction which would not have disgraced even such notable farceurs as Ben Travers and Brian Rix... one of the livelier exhibits of the festive season on the box. A pity it wasn't screened earlier in the week when we sat, bloated and comatose, watching rotten old movies." Like Last he singled out Thorne as the highlight: "It is the most brilliant impersonation I have seen. It is all there, from the tilt of her head to the controlled, steel-edged voice".

== Legacy ==
At the time Anyone for Denis? was broadcast, Wells talked about making a TV series with Thorne. On 23 December 1990, BBC One showed a half-hour film, Dunrulin, with the pair playing the Thatchers after her retirement from public life. Planned as the pilot for a series of six episodes written by Wells and Alistair Beaton, it had been made two years beforehand, but the BBC had put it on hold, first for it to be remade with a less harsh depiction of her children (Wells and Beaton had had Mark unemployed and living with his parents, and Carol homeless) and then indefinitely; even when the Corporation decided to screen it following her resignation in November 1990, they took legal advice about its broadcast and gave it minimal publicity. A.N. Wilson wrote in the Sunday Telegraph, "in light of what happened this autumn, to screen it seemed tasteless and cruel". Richard Last in the Daily Telegraph, while renewing his praise of Thorne, felt that, if it were to run for more than six episodes, the show "might die for want of sustenance". Hugh Hebert in The Guardian took the film as proof that "Margaret Thatcher is now definitively unfunny".

== Bibliography ==
- Cannadine, David (2017). Margaret Thatcher: A Life and Legacy. New York: Oxford University Press. ISBN 978-0-19-879500-1.
- Carpenter, Humphrey (2000). That Was Satire That Was: The Satire Boom of the 1960s. London: Victor Gollancz. ISBN 0575-06588-5.
- Thatcher, Carol (1996). Below the Parapet: The Biography of Denis Thatcher. London: HarperCollins. ISBN 978-0-00-255605-7.
- Young, Hugo (1991) [1st pub. 1989]. One of Us: A Biography of Margaret Thatcher (rev. ed.). London: Macmillan London. ISBN 0-333-56585-1.
