= Prime Minister parodies (Private Eye) =

Satirical feature in Private Eye magazine

Prime Minister parodies are a long-running feature of the British satirical magazine Private Eye, which have been included in the majority of issues since the magazine's inception. The parodies consist of one arch satirical personification of the prime minister of the United Kingdom of the day, and use that personification to send up continuously that Prime Minister's personality and style of leadership, and the personalities and general features of their cabinet. Such are their popularity that the parodies usually find their way into mainstream culture far beyond simply being viewed as a joke within the pages of Private Eye, and are subsequently mentioned often in other journalistic appraisals of the individual in question.

== List by prime minister ==
=== Harold Wilson: Mrs Wilson's Diary ===
Mrs Wilson's Diary was the imaginary diary of Prime Minister Harold Wilson's wife Mary, in the style of the BBC radio serial Mrs Dale's Diary. Written initially by Peter Cook and Richard Ingrams, then by Ingrams and John Wells, it chronicled the events in Wilson's life from Mary's more down-to-earth and homely perspective. Much fun was made of the Wilsons' petit-bourgeois lifestyle (her supposed fondness for Wincarnis tonic wine and his for HP sauce), as well as of her poetry. (Note: Wilson was often accused of trying to make his background appear more proletarian than it was.) The diary revived in 1974, when Wilson returned to Downing Street, before finally coming to an end on his resignation in 1976.

The "Diary" caught the mood of the nation in the mid- to late 1960s. The column subsequently appeared as a sketch on satirical television programmes, and was adapted as a musical play under the eye of Joan Littlewood (music by Jeremy Taylor), being performed in the West End. It was published in book form, and inspired a similar feature in the American magazine National Lampoon named Mrs Agnew's Diary, purporting to be the actual journal of Vice President Spiro Agnew's wife Judy.

=== Edward Heath: Heathco Newsletter ===
Heathco Newsletter purported to be an internal missive from Edward Heath, the managing director of a firm called Heathco, in which Heath addresses his staff in managementese jargon. This parodied Heath's emphasis on efficiency and modernisation, as well as his supposed coldness and social awkwardness. Cabinet ministers were recast as petty managers and clerks in this satire. The company's logo was a stylised yacht (Heath's hobby was yachting). The newsletters invariably ended with a request to staff which admonished them for stubbing their cigarettes out in the plastic cups in which the canteen served them with tea. Frequent reference was made to the malfunctioning of the Automatic Plastic Beaker Disposal Unit, or APBDU.

=== James Callaghan ===
There was no Prime Ministerial parody by Private Eye of James Callaghan's government.

=== Margaret Thatcher: Dear Bill ===
Dear Bill consisted of spoof letters from Denis Thatcher to his friend Bill Deedes, editor of the Daily Telegraph, about life as the henpecked consort of Margaret Thatcher. The series portrayed Denis as a right-wing alcoholic staggering between drinks with various friends, many of whom, like Bill and Denis, played golf. The putative author was often commanded to accompany his wife ("the Boss") on various tours—at home and abroad; electioneering, political and statesmanlike, plus "very" occasional holidays; Denis has his own slant on everywhere he goes, and often meets an old chummo with whom he can partake of a libation or two. A recurring feature of the letters are Denis's Wodehousian euphemisms for drinks ("lotions", "tinctures", "large ones", "snorts", "electric soup"). The column was written by Richard Ingrams and John Wells. Wells, also a comic actor, developed a sideline as an impersonator of Denis Thatcher. When published in book form, Dear Bill sold 125,000 copies in paperback and remained in the bestseller lists for six months.

The parody led to several spin-offs. Wells wrote and starred in a West End stage play titled Anyone for Denis? which ran for over a year from 1981 to 1982, and was then televised. Wells also collaborated with Secret Policeman's Ball series co-creator/producer Martin Lewis and Not the Nine O'Clock News series co-creator/producer John Lloyd on the comedy album Iron Lady: The Coming Of The Leader. The album was written by Wells who also appeared on it performing multiple characters. Lewis and Lloyd produced. Margaret Thatcher was portrayed by Janet Brown. Wells and Brown repeated their impersonations of the Thatchers in the 1981 James Bond film For Your Eyes Only.

=== John Major: The Secret Diary of John Major (aged 47¾) ===
The Secret Diary of John Major (aged 47¾) was a weekly spoof diary entry based on The Secret Diary of Adrian Mole, Aged 13¾ in which John Major was characterised as being hopelessly naïve and optimistic, as well as childish, dull, weak and obsessed by trivia. "My wife Norman", "Norma Lamont" and "Mr Dr Mawhinney" were recurring characters, and in the later years of his premiership he seemed oblivious to the fact that "Mr Heseltine" was actually running the government. He kept lists of his enemies in a Ryman notebook called his "Bastards Book", referring to Major's unguarded description of eurosceptic Cabinet members as "Bastards".

The diary reappears occasionally, such as after the revelation of his affair with Edwina Currie, when he was made a Knight of the Garter, and after he attended the funeral of Edward Heath.

=== Tony Blair: St Albion Parish News ===
St Albion Parish News was the newsletter of a fictional parish, "St Albion", in which Tony Blair's religious beliefs and style of public speaking saw him characterised as a trendy yet sanctimonious Church of England vicar. Members of his government were various parish officials, e.g. Gordon Brown as the grumpy parish treasurer, Hazel Blears as the bicycling deliverer of the parish newsletter, and Peter Mandelson as the church warden, in charge of running the parish's Millennium Tent on the village green.

Blair often received updates from his transatlantic confidant, George Bush, from the "Church of the Latter-Day Morons", or a topical variant thereof (such as the "Church of Latter-Day More Bombs" in times of war). From 1997 to 2001, during the presidency of Bill Clinton, the correspondence was described as coming from "The Church of the 7th Day Fornicators" in reference to Clinton's womanising.

In 1998, Sermon from St. Albion's, an ITV television series based on the column, was shown. It starred Harry Enfield as the Rev. Blair and was written by Private Eye editor Ian Hislop.

=== Gordon Brown: Prime Ministerial Decree ===
Prime Ministerial Decree was a mock Stalinist decree by "supreme leader" Gordon Brown, portrayed as a centralist dictator. Brown continuously hailed the "Age of Change" and often attempted to revise history (playing on Brown's degree in history), making harsh attacks on the "discredited regime" of "former Comrade Blair". The column made much of the Soviet-era tendency to coin philosophies related to certain people, often referring to "Blairist-Mandelsonism", "Osbornist-Cameronian" and other variants.

=== David Cameron: The New Coalition Academy/Cameron Free School ===
During his first premiership, a coalition with the Liberal Democrats, David Cameron (MA Oxon) was portrayed as the headmaster of The New Coalition Academy (formerly Brown's Comprehensive) along with Deputy Headmaster Nick Clegg (MA Cantab), whose contributions to the school newsletter were invariably cut short "owing to lack of space", often to make room for a gratuitous photograph of the headmaster's attractive wife. Setting the parody in an academy highlighted the academisation of schools that was being pushed by the Cameron–Clegg coalition.

The school's motto was "Duo in Uno" and its mission statement was different every issue. Key members of staff included Mr Cable the Business Studies teacher, whose lengthy reports the headmaster often promised "to get round to reading", Mr Osborne the bursar and his assistant Mr Alexander, who had joined the staff "since leaving school last year". The Secretary of State for Defence was the head of the cadets and the Home Secretary the master in charge of detentions. Former Secretary of State for Education Michael Gove was regularly pictured sitting on a child's play chair, dubbed the "naughty chair", for various misdemeanors. Members of the Labour Party were "temporary supply teachers". The election of the Mayor of London was referred to as "auditions for the role of Dick Whittington in the school panto."

Following the 2015 General Election, in which the Conservative Party won an outright majority, the parody school was renamed the Cameron Free School.

=== Theresa May: St. Theresa's Independent State Grammar School for Girls (and Boys) ===
The Cameron Free School was renamed St. Theresa's Independent State Grammar School for Girls (and Boys) after Theresa May assumed the premiership in 2016. After the 2017 general election and the Conservative–DUP agreement, it added "Incorporating the William III Orange Academy" to its title. The school's coat of arms featured a pair of leopard-print kitten heel women's shoes, parodying a favourite style of May's. In 2017 one of these shoes was replaced by an orange. The school's motto was "Unitas in Divisione" (United in Division). In 2018, the ongoing withdrawal from the "European Education Union" led to the school being placed in "special measures." After May's resignation, the school was renamed St. Somebody's Independent Grammar School for Girls (and Boys), not necessarily incorporating The William III Orange Academy covered with a banner reading "Temporarily Closed", and a question mark replacing the shoes in the coat of arms.

=== Boris Johnson: The People's PMQs ===
Upon Boris Johnson's accession the school theme was abandoned for the first time since the Tories returned to power, replaced by The People's PMQs, in which the prime minister broadcasts a livestream on Facebook taking questions from members of the public. The article parodies actual question-and-answer sessions that were held by Johnson. Johnson frequently wanders off topic and babbles incoherently, with references to Dominic Cummings (his special adviser) giving him hand signals from out of frame.

=== Prime Minister's WhatsApp ===
Later in Johnson's premiership, the Facebook element was abandoned in favour of a WhatsApp feed of the Prime Minister and his government called The Prime Minister's WhatsApp. The WhatsApp theme continued during Liz Truss's short period as PM (only a few weeks in 2022), throughout Rishi Sunak's premiership and into Keir Starmer's premiership.

=== Andy Burnham: Coronation Street ===
Coronation Street takes the form of a script for Coronation Street, a soap set in the fictional Manchester suburb of Weatherfield. Burnham’s character is the landlord of the pub, renamed as The Voters’ Return, with members of the Cabinet and others playing customers with roles and personalities to reflect their real-life positions. The jukebox regularly plays The Smiths, reflecting Burnham’s frequent references to their music.

== Audio parodies ==
The Private Eye recordings issued by the magazine from time-to-time, especially in its first fifteen years, featured comedic impersonations and lampoons of the following Prime Ministers:

- Harold Macmillan
- Sir Alec Douglas-Home
- Harold Wilson
- Edward Heath

The Prime Ministers were impersonated by various members of the Private Eye staff and friends, including Peter Cook, John Bird, Richard Ingrams, and Willie Rushton.

== See also ==
- Private Eye
- Prime Minister of the United Kingdom
- List of recurring in-jokes in Private Eye
- Details of the Private Eye recordings

== Bibliography ==
- Carpenter, Humphrey (2000). That Was Satire That Was: The Satire Boom of the 1960s. London: Victor Gollancz. ISBN 0575-06588-5.
- Marnham, Patrick (1982). The Private Eye Story: The First 21 Years. London: Fontana/Collins. ISBN 0006364535.
- Thatcher, Carol (1996). Below the Parapet: The Biography of Denis Thatcher. London: HarperCollins. ISBN 978-0-00-255605-7.
- Wilmut, Roger (1980). From Fringe to Flying Circus: Celebrating a Unique Generation of Comedy, 1960-1980. London: Eyre Methuen. ISBN 0-413-46950-6.
