= APBDU =

APBDU mey refer to:

- Anomalous pancreaticobiliary duct union or pancreaticobiliary maljunction, a disorder of the pancreas and bile duct
- Automatic Plastic Beaker Disposal Unit, a running joke in the satirical magazine Private Eye
