= Yo, Blair =

Quote by U.S. president George W. Bush

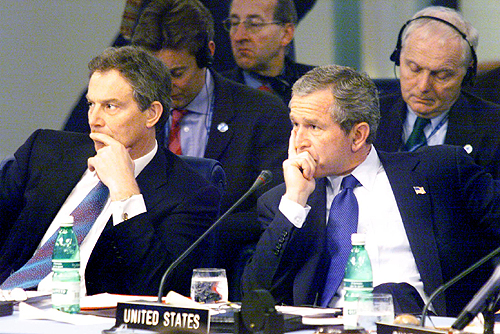
Blair and Bush in 2002

"Yo, Blair. How are you doing?" was an informal greeting reportedly made by United States President George W. Bush to British Prime Minister Tony Blair during the summit of the Group of Eight industrialized nations (G8) in St Petersburg, Russia, on 17 July 2006. The line was popularly quoted in the media.

== Phrasing ==
Although the greeting was popularized as "Yo, Blair", American media outlets such as The New York Times and The Washington Post transcribed it as "Yeah, Blair", while several British journalists, including Simon Hoggart and John Rentoul, have characterised the "Yo, Blair" transcript as a "myth":

You would think, wouldn't you, that if you were going to take a widely-reported phrase as the title of your polemic against Tony Blair you might just check that the phrase had actually been uttered as reported? You might even listen to the recording. Top marks to Simon Hoggart [...] for drawing our attention to the fact that George Bush never said "Yo, Blair!" Listen to the start of his programme and you'll hear the President very clearly saying: "Yeah, Blair, what are you doing?"

In a comment on Hoggart's piece, Bryan Appleyard concluded that the "Yo, Blair" version became "entrenched as recorded fact" because it corresponded to the "perceived 'inner truth' of the Blair–Bush poodle–master relationship".

Yo, Blair! is the title of a polemical 2006 book by Geoffrey Wheatcroft, attacking Blair on various issues, particularly his relationship with Bush.

== Meeting summary ==
There was considerable interest both in the "Yo, Blair" phrase itself and in the ensuing impromptu conversation. Although supposedly private, it was picked up by a microphone. In the course of the exchange, Bush, among other things, thanked Blair for the gift of a sweater and, more importantly, referred to an armed conflict that had just broken out in Lebanon between Israeli forces and the Shi'a group Hezbollah ("What they need to do is get Syria to get Hezbollah to stop doing this shit and it's all over"). This was reaffirmed by the suggestion to "get Kofi [Annan] on the phone with [Bashar] Assad and make something happen." He also stated that Condoleezza Rice would visit the area.

== "Yo, Blair" as a catchphrase ==
"Yo, Blair" or "Yo, [any surname]" almost immediately became a catchphrase in Britain. In her annual Language Report (2007) for the Oxford University Press, the lexicographer Susie Dent devoted over half a page to the term, including some of the references below.

When Blair rose to make a statement in the House of Commons on 19 July 2006, he was greeted with cries from the Opposition benches of "Yo!" A cartoon by Gerald Scarfe in The Sunday Times showed Bush in a rocking chair, dressed as a sheriff, directing his Secretary of State Condoleezza Rice, "Yo, Condi. Better go check out that sh*t. Don't hurry".

=== "Yo George" ===
This was the subject of a cartoon by Scarfe, reflecting on the Anglo-American "special relationship". In it, Bush, atop scenes of devastation, disbursed unequal quantities of munitions for Israel and aid for Lebanon. A small, plaintive Blair looked on and, raising his hand, asked, "Yo George. I just wondered if I might have a word?"

"Yo George", the highly political first track on Tori Amos' 2007 album American Doll Posse, is a direct reference to the "Yo, Blair" incident.

=== "Yo Vicar": Private Eye ===
The satirical magazine Private Eye began its regular spoof letter from the vicar of St Albion's parish church (the Rev. A.R.P. Blair, M.A.) with the greeting, "Yo!". The ensuing epistle contained a range of variants, "Yo, Running Scared", "Yo, Vicar" and "Yo, Dubya" (the latter invoking a well established play on Bush's middle initial).

== "Yo" as slang ==
"Yo" has been used as an exclamation to attract attention since the 15th century. In the early 20th century "yo" was used in lower middle class British slang as a "declaration of admiration... to the softer sex by the sterner". In the mid to late 20th century, the term was popularized, possibly independently of the previous usage, by the Italian-American community in Philadelphia, Pennsylvania. The term spread to other communities, notably the Philadelphia African-American community, before spreading beyond Philadelphia. In the late 20th century, it frequently appeared in hip hop music and became associated with African American Vernacular English.

Former British government minister Denis MacShane observed that "Yo, Blair" was the American equivalent of "wotcher, mate" and that metaphorically Bush and Blair had been addressing each other using the French informal tu ("you"), as opposed to the more formal vous.

== "Pedigree Chum" ==
Former British Foreign Secretary and NATO Secretary-General Peter Carrington reflected, "Iraq, and more recently Lebanon, have totally sidelined us. We have far less influence than we had. That 'Yo, Blair' exchange... was so humiliating".

Following a meeting in Washington, D.C. between Bush and Blair on 28 July to discuss the situation in Lebanon, cartoonist for The Times Neil Bennett, depicted, above the caption, "Gifts were exchanged before the Washington summit", a Burberry bag (an allusion to "Yo Blair") being swapped for a tin of dog food marked "Pedigree Chum". That was a reference to the charge of some that Blair had been acting as America's "poodle", a metaphor that had been used in British politics since at least 1907.

In May 2007 Bush denied that Blair was his "poodle" but remarked on his "dogged" style of leadership, while Anthony Seldon, who wrote an unauthorised biography of Blair, noted that when greeting Blair at the White House, Bush would typically welcome him with arms outstretched, yelling, "Hey. Blair. How y'doing'?"

== Harper event ==
On Monday July 7, 2008 at the 34th annual G8 summit in Toyako, Japan, while speaking with Nigerian President Umaru Yar'Adua, Bush summoned Canadian prime minister Stephen Harper with a brusque "Yo Harper!" Much like in the UK, political and public reaction was divided between this being an indication of the close relationship between the two, the subservience of Harper or simply another example of the "folksy" disposition of Bush.

== See also ==
- United Kingdom as the 51st state
- Anglo-American relations
- Foreign relations of the United Kingdom
- Foreign relations of the United States
