= Anyone for Denis? =

Anyone for Denis? may refer to:

- 'Dear Bill', a series of letters in satirical magazine Private Eye purporting to be from Denis Thatcher
- Anyone for Denis? (play) a West End stage revue based on the above
- Anyone for Denis? (video), a 1982 television adaptation of the play
