= Mary Wilson, Lady Wilson of Rievaulx =

English poet (1916–2018)

The Right Honourable The Lady Wilson of Rievaulx
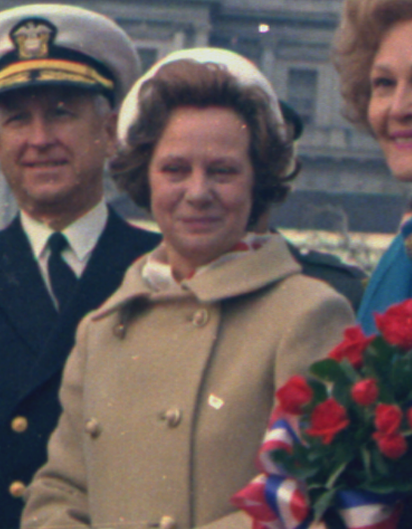
- Wilson in 1970
- Born: Gladys Mary Baldwin; 12 January 1916; Diss, Norfolk, England
- Died: 6 June 2018 (aged 102); London, England
- Resting place: St Mary's Old Church, St Mary's, Isles of Scilly
- Occupations: Poet; stenographer
- Known for: Spouse of the prime minister of the United Kingdom (1964–1970, 1974–1976)
- Political party: Labour
- Spouse: Harold Wilson (m. 1940; died 1995)
- Children: 2, including Robin

Gladys Mary Wilson, Baroness Wilson of Rievaulx (née Baldwin; 12 January 1916 – 6 June 2018) was an English poet and the wife of Harold Wilson, who twice served as British prime minister. She was the first British prime minister's spouse to become a centenarian, living to the age of 102 years, 145 days.

== Life ==
Gladys Mary Baldwin was born in Diss, Norfolk, the daughter of the Reverend Daniel Baldwin, who was a Congregationalist minister. She attended boarding school at Milton Mount College leaving aged 16 to attend a secretarial course for two years. She was employed as a stenographer at Lever Brothers in Port Sunlight before marrying Harold Wilson on New Year's Day 1940 at Mansfield College, Oxford. Baldwin and Wilson had two sons, Robin (born 1943) and Giles (born 1948).

In 1970, her volume of poetry Selected Poems was published, and, in 1976, Mary Wilson was one of three judges of the Booker Prize, the other judges being Walter Allen and Francis King. According to the Dictionary of National Biography entry for Harold Wilson, written by Roy Jenkins, Wilson was not satisfied with life in politics. It was this detachment which gave the Private Eye spoof "Mrs Wilson's Diary", the supposed diary of Wilson, written in the style of the BBC's daily radio serial Mrs Dale's Diary, a spurious look of authenticity.

Politically, she opposed her husband in the 1975 European Communities membership referendum by voting against continued membership and in her support for the Campaign for Nuclear Disarmament.

Wilson was widowed on 24 May 1995 when her husband died of colorectal cancer and Alzheimer's disease after ten years of illness. They were married for 55 years. She continued to live in Westminster, a short distance from Downing Street. She retained the couple's holiday home in the Isles of Scilly.

In 2010, at the age of 94, she attended the funeral of Michael Foot. Three years later, at the age of 97, she accepted an invitation to the funeral of Margaret Thatcher.

== Death ==
Wilson died following a stroke at St Thomas' Hospital in London on 6 June 2018, at the age of 102, having outlived her husband by 23 years. The longest-lived spouse of a British prime minister, she was the first to live beyond the age of 100. A private service followed by cremation took place on mainland Britain, and her ashes were buried with her husband at Old Town Churchyard in St Mary's, Isles of Scilly.

== Publications ==
- Wilson, Mary (1970). Selected Poems. London: Hutchinson. ISBN 978-0-09-105010-8.
- Wilson, Mary (1979). New Poems. London: Hutchinson. ISBN 978-0-09-139460-8.
- Wilson, Mary (2004). A Journey to Scilly. St. Mary's, Isles of Scilly: A.H. Read & Son.
