= A Melon for Ecstasy =

1971 novel by John Fortune and John Wells

- First edition
- Author: John Fortune and John Wells
- Language: English
- Genre: Comedy
- Publisher: Putnam
- Publication date: 1971
- Publication place: United States
- Media type: Print (Hardcover)
- Pages: 187 pp

A Melon for Ecstasy is a 1971 novel written by John Fortune and John Wells. The title is claimed to derive from an Arabic and Turkish proverb, "A woman for duty / A boy for pleasure / But a melon for ecstasy."

== Plot summary ==
Written in an epistolary style, consisting of newspaper cuttings, letters, and extensive excerpts from the diary of its protagonist, the novel tells the story of Humphrey Mackevoy, a young man who achieves sexual satisfaction by boring holes in trees and penetrating them with his penis.

Intercut with the story of how his passion leads him into confusion, shame and prison, but eventually into acceptance of, and almost pride in his peculiarity, are a series of comic sub-plots involving the local naturalists' society (are the holes appearing in trees around town really the work of the sabre-toothed dormouse?); a feud between local councillors that leads to mass poisoning; Mackevoy's unwitting involvements in the sexual fantasies of teenager Rose Hopkins; and the increasingly outrageous behaviour of "mummy".

== Literary significance and criticism ==
The novel is a satirical depiction of British sexual mores, newspaper letters to the editor, and public life in the late 1960s and early 1970s.
