= Where Was Spring? =

Where Was Spring? is a British television sketch comedy programme, which was first aired by the BBC in 1969–70 with a total of eleven episodes.

== Programme ==
The cast consisted of Eleanor Bron and John Fortune, two stalwarts of the British satire scene in the 1960s. The show consisted of a series of two-handed sketches performed only by Bron and Fortune, mostly playing married or romantic couples though often not seen romantically.

The sketches were performed in a television studio setting which reinforced the sophistication of the scripts. There were also animated sequences supplied by Klaus Voormann, designer of the cover for the Beatles' Revolver album. These were accompanied by songs specially commissioned from Ray Davies of the Kinks. One of these, Where Did My Spring Go?, echoed the series title.

One other distinctive feature of the show's style were stylised photographs of both Bron and Fortune shown between sketches where the couple are dressed as Graeco-Roman Gods (Jupiter/Venus), perhaps illustrative of the perfection or imperfection of classic male-female relationships.

Critics found the humor of the show sophisticated and sharp. "The show's caustic wit bites deep below the surface layers of life," wrote one reviewer.

== After 1970 ==
Recordings of the show are believed to have been wiped by the BBC as part of an economy measure. Many of the sketches were reproduced in the book Is Your Marriage Really Necessary? (1972) by Bron and Fortune, a hardcover with illustrating photographs.
