= John Fortune =

English actor and writer (1939–2013)

- Born: John Courtney Wood; 30 June 1939; Bristol, England
- Died: 31 December 2013 (aged 74); Hampshire, England
- Occupations: Actor; writer
- Spouses: Susan Fry Waldo, aka Susannah Waldo Wood (m. 1962; div. 1976); Emma Burge (m. 1995)
- Children: 3

John Courtney Fortune (born John Courtney Wood; 30 June 1939 – 31 December 2013) was an English actor, writer and satirist, best known for his work with John Bird and Rory Bremner on the television series Bremner, Bird and Fortune.

== Early life ==
Fortune was born John Courtney Wood in Bristol on 30 June 1939. He was educated at Bristol Cathedral School and King's College, Cambridge, where he was to meet and form a lasting friendship with John Bird.

== Career ==
Fortune's early work included contributions to Peter Cook's Establishment Club team in 1962, and as a regular member of the cast of the BBC-TV satire show Not So Much a Programme, More a Way of Life, both alongside Eleanor Bron and John Bird. Fortune and Bird also worked together on the TV show A Series of Birds in 1967, and Fortune and Bron wrote and performed a series of sketches for TV in Where Was Spring? in 1969. In 1971, with John Wells, he published the comic novel A Melon for Ecstasy, about a man who consummates his love affair with a tree. He appeared with Peter Sellers in a Barclays Bank television commercial in 1980, shortly before Sellers' death.

Along with writing several series for the BBC, in 1982 Fortune appeared in an episode of the BBC sitcom Yes Minister, as an army officer who brings the minister's attention to British-made weapons getting into the hands of terrorists. In 1999, he starred with Warren Mitchell and Ken Campbell in Art at Wyndham's Theatre in London's West End. He also appeared in the films Take A Girl Like You (1970), in which he shared a TV debate with John Bird, Kenny Everett's horror spoof Bloodbath at the House of Death (1984), England, My England (1995), Maybe Baby (2000), and Saving Grace (2000), and had a guest part in the sitcom Joking Apart.

In 1993, Fortune and Bird began co-starring with Rory Bremner in the sketch show Rory Bremner...Who Else? on Channel 4. In 1999, the show changed its name to Bremner, Bird and Fortune and continued until 2010, receiving several BAFTA nominations along the way.

Fortune's other work with John Bird included their series of satirical sketches The Long Johns, in which one interviewed the other, the latter being in the guise of a senior figure such as a politician, businessman or government consultant. The sketches earned several BAFTA award nominations, winning the Television Light Entertainment Performance award in 1997. In one episode, they were two of the very first to predict the 2008 financial crisis during an episode of The South Bank Show broadcast on 14 October 2007. In Fortune's latter years, he featured in the Radio 4 sitcom Ed Reardon's Week, playing the head of a literary agency and as theatrical agent Mel Simons in a 2008 episode of New Tricks.

Fortune died on 31 December 2013, aged 74. His agent Vivienne Clore said he died peacefully, with his wife Emma and dog Grizelle at his bedside.

== Filmography ==
Year	Title	Role	Notes
1970	Take a Girl Like You	Sir Gerald Culthorpe-Jones	
1982	The Missionary	Schoolmaster's voice	Voice
1984	Bloodbath at the House of Death	John Harrison	
1987	Hardwicke House	Educational psychologist in Episode 3, "Interview Day"	Only the first two episodes of the series were shown, with the last five pulled. It was scheduled to be screened on ITV on 4 March 1987. In 2019, all seven episodes were uploaded to YouTube.
1995	England, My England	Edward Hyde, Earl of Clarendon	
1999	The Strange Case of Delfina Potocka: The Mystery of Chopin	Second official	
2000	Saving Grace	Melvyn	
2000	Maybe Baby	Acupuncturist	
2001	The Tailor of Panama	Maltby	
2003	Calendar Girls	Frank	
2005	Match Point	John the Chauffeur	
