= Wincarnis =

British tonic wine

Wincarnis is a brand name of a British tonic wine, popular in Jamaica and some other former British colonies. The name is derived from "wine carnis", from the Latin meaning "of meat." It is a fortified wine (17%) now made to a secret recipe of grape juice, malt extracts, herbs and spices, but it no longer contains meat. Wincarnis has a similar taste to sweet sherry.

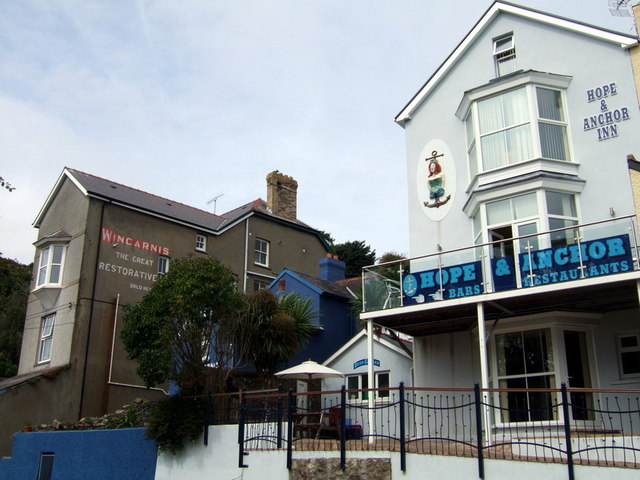
"Wincarnis: The Great Restorative," advertisement in Goodwick, Wales.

== History ==
Wincarnis was produced before 1881 by Coleman and Co Ltd in Norwich, England. Devised by William Juby Coleman, it was originally called Coleman's Liebig's Extract of Meat and Malt Wine. It was advertised as made with Port Wine, Liebig's Extract of Meat and extract of Malt, and called "the finest tonic and restorative in the world".

The brand was eventually owned by Hedges & Butler (part of Bass), which was acquired in 1998 by Ian Macleod Distillers Ltd of Broxburn, Scotland. Wincarnis is currently made by Broadland Wineries in Norfolk, and sold by Macleod.

== Markets ==
Wincarnis is now marketed as an aperitif wine. In Jamaica it is mixed with stout and milk. In Singapore, Malaysia and the Gulf, it is taken by new mothers as a tonic. It is well known by older people in the UK who use it as a tonic when not well. Ian MacLeod Distilleries marketing offers the ingredients:

Wincarnis Tonic Wine is a carefully formulated blend of enriched wine and malt extract with a unique infusion of selected therapeutic herbs and spices including gentian root, mugwort, angelica root, balm mint, fennel seed, coriander seed, peppermint leaves, cardamom seeds and cassia bark ... is a natural tonic incorporating herbs traditionally recognised for their ability to combat common ailments and alleviate their symptoms. It is rich in vitamins, especially energy-giving Vitamin B complex, and can have beneficial effects on the circulation system and blood pressure.

== See also ==
- Low-end fortified wine
- In the spoof "Mrs Wilson's Diary" in Private Eye magazine, British prime minister Harold Wilson was portrayed as a Wincarnis drinker.
- In the Yorkshire Television British TV sitcom You're Only Young Twice the residents of Paradise Lodge often drink Wincarnis.
