= Anyone for tennis? =

Saying

The phrase "Anyone for tennis?" (also given as "Tennis, anyone?") is an English language idiom primarily of the 20th century. The phrase is used to invoke a stereotype of shallow, leisured, upper-class toffs (tennis was, particularly before the widespread advent of public courts in the later 20th century, seen as a posh game for the rich, with courts popular at country clubs and private estates). It is a stereotypical entrance or exit line given to a young man of this class in a superficial drawing-room comedy.

== Usage ==
A close paraphrase of the saying, was used in George Bernard Shaw's 1914 drawing-room comedy Misalliance, in which Johnny Tarleton asks "Anybody on for a game of tennis?" (An 1891 story in the satirical magazine Punch put a generally similar notion in the mouth of a similar type of character: "I’m going to see if there’s anyone on the tennis-court, and get a game if I can. Ta-ta!".)

"Anyone for tennis?" is particularly associated with the early career of Hollywood star Humphrey Bogart, and he is cited as the first person to use the phrase on stage. At the start of his career, in the 1920s and early 1930s, Bogart appeared in many Broadway plays in what Jeffrey Meyers characterized as "charming and fatuous roles – in [one of] which he is supposed to have said 'Tennis, anyone?'".

If Bogart ever did speak the line, it would have presumably been in the 1925 play Hell's Bells, set at the Tanglewood Lodge in New Dauville, Connecticut. Bogart claimed that his line in the play was "It's forty-love outside. Anyone care to watch?", and that indeed is what is printed in the script. However, according to Darwin Porter, director John Hayden crossed out that line and replaced it with "Tennis, anyone?" before opening night. And several observers have asserted that he did say it, reportedly including Louella Parsons and Richard Watts Jr. Erskine Johnson, in a 1948 interview, reports Bogart as saying: "I used to play juveniles on Broadway and came bouncing into drawing rooms with a tennis racket under my arm and the line: 'Tennis anybody?' It was a stage trick to get some of the characters off the set so the plot could continue." But Bogart's usual stance was denial of using that precise phrase ("The lines I had were corny enough, but I swear to you, never once did I have to say 'Tennis, anyone?'"), although averring that it did characterize generally some of his early roles.

Though [Bogart's] early parts were as juveniles, he sometimes called them 'Tennis, anyone?' parts and that is why he is given credit for bringing that phrase into the language. He explained juveniles this way: 'The playwright gets five or six characters into a scene and doesn’t know how to get them offstage. So what does he do? He drags in the juvenile, who has been waiting in the wings for just such a chance. He comes in, tennis racquet under his arm, and says, "Tennis, anyone?" That, of course, solves the playwright’s problem. The player whom the author wants to get rid of for the time being accepts the suggestion. The leading lady, who is due for a love scene with the leading man, declines. So the others exit and all is ready for the love scene between the leading lady and man. It doesn’t always have to be tennis. Sometimes it’s golf or riding, but tennis is better because it gives the young man a chance to look attractive in spotless white flannels.'

— Stephan Humphrey Bogart, Bogart: In Search of My Father

The phrase continued to drift through media in the 20th century and, to a diminished extent, into the 21st, often at random or just because tennis generally is the subject, rather than specifically to invoke or mock vapid toffs. It appears in the lyric of the "Beautiful Girl Montage" in the classic 1952 musical movie Singin' in the Rain, in the Daffy Duck cartoons Rabbit Fire, Drip-Along Daffy and The Ducksters (1950–1951), and in the lyric and title of the 1968 song "Anyone for Tennis" by the British rock band Cream, which was the theme song of the film The Savage Seven. William Holden's shallow rich playboy character jokes "tennis, anyone?" when flirting with Joan Vohs's in the 1954 film Sabrina (in which Bogart plays another character). The television series Anyone for Tennyson? (1976–1978) riffs on the name, as does the 1981 stage play Anyone for Denis? "Anyone for Tennis" is the title of the B-side instrumental for Men at Work's 1981 single Who Can It Be Now?.

The phrase also occurs in Monty Python's spoof sketch Sam Peckinpah's "Salad Days". Chris de Burgh uses this phrase in the beginning of "Patricia the Stripper". In the Seinfeld episode The Comeback, Jerry recites an exaggerated 'Tennis anyone?' to gain the attention of the lady in a sports shop. And musical comedian Victor Borges' inflationary language routine, in which he added one to any number or phonetic equivalent (e.g. "wonderful" become "twoderfil"), inflated the phrase to "anytwo five elevennis".

In the first part of The Stones of Blood episode of the 16th season of Dr Who (the Fourth Doctor, played by Tom Baker), broadcast on 28 October 1978, the Doctor says “Any one for tennis?” to which Romana I, unaware of human sports, asks “Tennis?,” and the Doctor explains “Yes, it's an English expression. It means, is anyone coming outdoors to get soaked?”

In the final episode of Wallace & Gromit’s Cracking Contraptions, Wallace utters the phrase “Anyone for tennis, perchance?” after being outsmarted by Gromit in their previous game of mechanically assisted football.
