= John Wells (satirist) =

British actor and satirist (1936–1998)

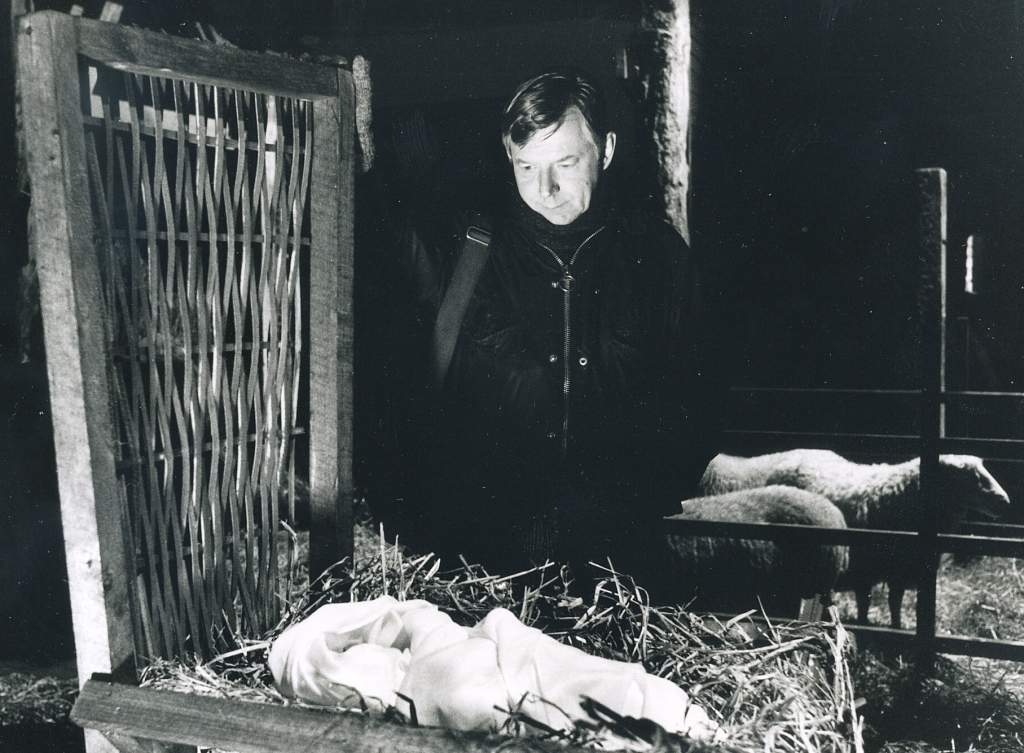
- From John Wells and the Three Wise Men (produced by Open Media in 1988)
- Born: John Campbell Wells; 17 November 1936; Ashford, Kent, England
- Died: 11 January 1998 (aged 61); London, England
- Education: St Edmund Hall, Oxford (BA)
- Occupations: Actor; satirist; writer
- Spouse: Teresa Chancellor (m. 1982)
- Children: Dolly Wells

John Campbell Wells (17 November 1936 – 11 January 1998) was an English actor, writer and satirist.

== Early life ==
The son of a cleric, Wells was born in Ashford, Kent, in 1936. He was educated at Eastbourne College and St Edmund Hall, Oxford.

== Career ==
Wells started in cabaret at Oxford and began his television career as a writer on That Was The Week That Was, the 1960s weekly satire show that launched the careers of David Frost and Millicent Martin, among others, and also appeared in the television programme Not So Much a Programme, More a Way of Life, as well as in The Secret Policeman's Other Ball. Besides making cameo appearances in films such as Casino Royale (1967) and Rentadick (1972), television dramas like Casanova (1987), an episode of Lovejoy (1991) and comedy shows like Yes Minister, he also wrote television scripts and screenplays, such as Princess Caraboo (1994).

In 1971, with John Fortune, he published the comedy A Melon for Ecstasy, about a man who consummates his love affair with a tree. Wells played the headmaster of Thursgood's Preparatory School in Tinker, Tailor, Soldier, Spy (1979).

Wells was one of the original contributors to the satirical magazine Private Eye and contributed to the column Mrs Wilson's Diary, the long-running spoof journal of the wife of Prime Minister Harold Wilson.

From 1979 he repeated that success with Dear Bill, a series of letters (co-written with Richard Ingrams) supposedly sent by Denis Thatcher, husband of Prime Minister Margaret Thatcher, to Bill Deedes. Wells developed the feature into a stage farce, Anyone for Denis?, first performed in 1981, in which he played Denis Thatcher. Co-starring Angela Thorne as Mrs. Thatcher, the play was a major West End hit, toured the UK and was adapted for television. He co-wrote Alice in Wonderland, a musical adaptation of Lewis Carroll’s novel with Carl Davis, which debuted at The Lyric Theatre in the West End, London.

Wells also played Denis Thatcher in the Bond movie For Your Eyes Only (1981). In 1990, he and Thorne again played the Thatchers in Dunrulin, a one-off TV sitcom-like satirical look at the couple in retirement. He also voiced Arnold the Elephant, Edward the Monkey and Bert in the children's TV series Charlie Chalk.

In 1988, Leonard Bernstein started working on a new version of his much-revised operetta Candide. The author of the original book, Hugh Wheeler, had died, and John Wells was asked to help revise the text. The first production of this "final version", by Scottish Opera, was followed by a "final revised version" in 1989, performances of which have been released on CD and DVD. An insert in the DVD ("Bernstein and Voltaire"), written by Wells, explained what Bernstein had wanted in this final revised version.

Wells authored Rude Words in 1991, a history of the London Library, for the institution's 150th anniversary.

In 1997, Wells appeared in the BBC situation comedy Chalk as ineffectual headmaster Richard Nixon. His fellow cast members do not recall him being ill on set, but he was too unwell to participate in the second series.

Wells' last book, House of Lords, was a best-seller and published a year before his death in 1998. The book is a historical and humorous study of the British peerage system.

== Personal life ==
In 1982, Wells married Teresa Chancellor (daughter of Sir Christopher and sister of Alexander). She had been married to Edward Gatacre, son of Sir William Forbes Gatacre. Their daughter, actress Dolly Wells, was the product of their affair; she was brought up believing Gatacre was her father and Wells was her stepfather.

Wells died of cancer in London in 1998 at the age of 61.

== Filmography ==
Title	Year	Role	Notes
Casino Royale	1967	Fordyce, Q's assistant	
The Bobo	1967	Pompadour Major Domo	
Asterix the Gaul	1967	Cacofonix aka Stopthemusix	English dub, uncredited
30 Is a Dangerous Age, Cynthia	1968	The Honorable Gavin Hopton	
Every Home Should Have One	1970	Tolworth	
Rentadick	1972	Owltruss	
For Your Eyes Only	1981	Denis Thatcher	
Bullshot	1983	American Scientist	
Greystoke: The Legend of Tarzan, Lord of the Apes	1984	Sir Evelyn Blount	
Revolution	1985	Corty	
Consuming Passions	1988	Dr. Forrester	
Princess Caraboo	1994	Reverend Hunt	
Gulliver's Travels	1996	Flimnap the Treasurer	TV Mini-Series, 1 episode
