= Red Gables (Carlisle) =

House in Carlisle, Cumbria, England

Coordinates: 54°53′42″N 2°55′42″W

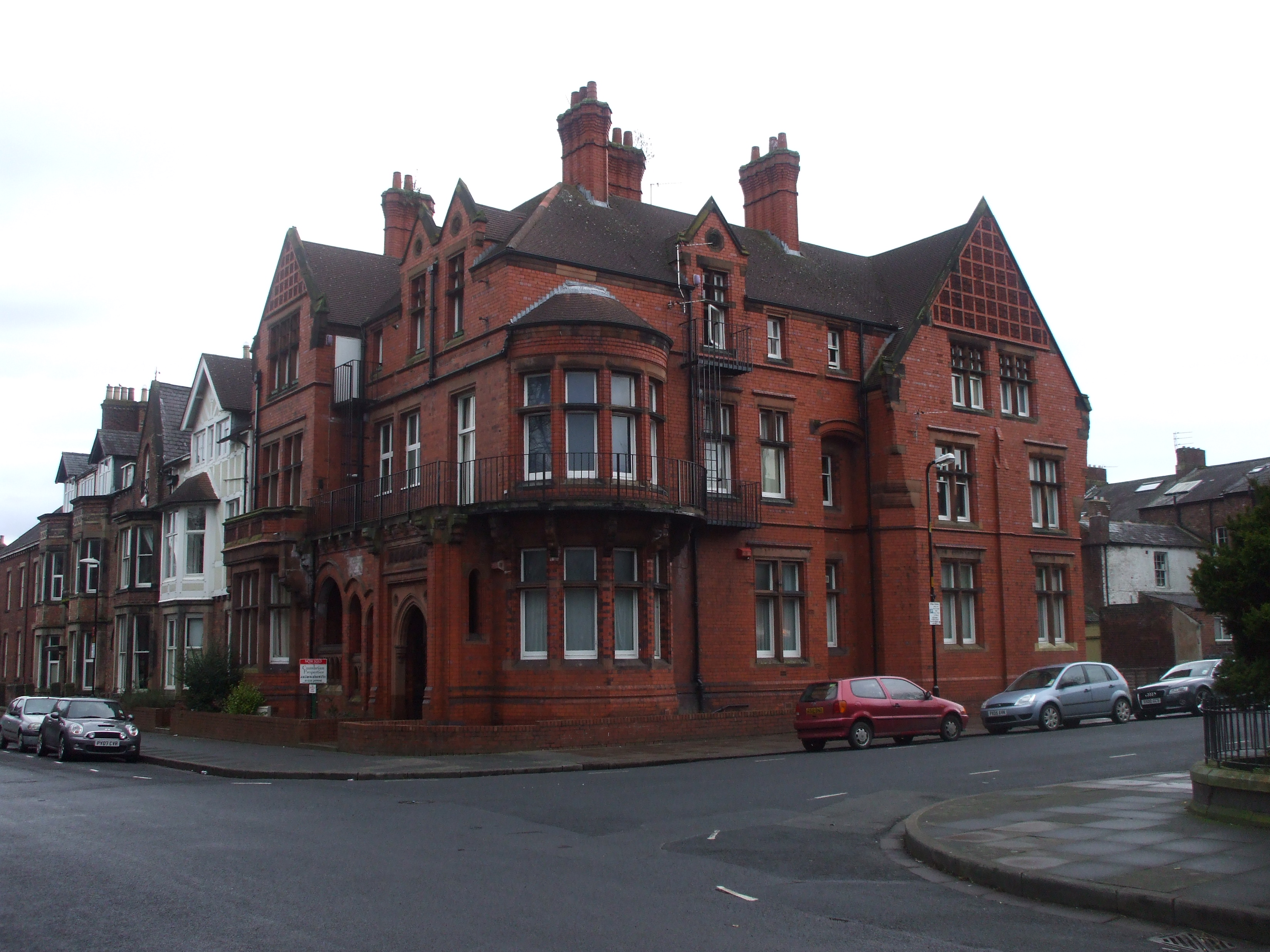

Red Gables is a large house in Carlisle, Cumbria, England. It was built originally for William Hudson Scott of the Hudson, Scott & Sons business, and the architect was George Dale Oliver, who designed it in the style of Alfred Waterhouse. After Scott died in 1907, it was used as a boarding school until 1966, when it was returned to residential use and converted into flats. The building is Grade II listed for statutory protection for its architectural and historic interest.
