= Bill Deedes =

British politician (1913–2007)

The Right Honourable The Lord Deedes KBE MC PC

Minister without Portfolio
- In office 13 July 1962 – 16 October 1964
- Prime Minister: Harold Macmillan; Alec Douglas-Home
- Preceded by: The Lord Mills
- Succeeded by: Eric Fletcher

Parliamentary Secretary to the Ministry of Housing and Local Government
- In office 18 October 1954 – 20 December 1955
- Prime Minister: Winston Churchill; Anthony Eden
- Preceded by: Ernest Marples
- Succeeded by: Enoch Powell

Member of the House of Lords
- Lord Temporal
- Life peerage 23 September 1986 – 17 August 2007

Member of Parliament for Ashford
- In office 23 February 1950 – 20 September 1974
- Preceded by: Edward Percy Smith
- Succeeded by: Keith Speed

Personal details
- Born: William Francis Deedes; 1 June 1913 Hampstead, London, England
- Died: 17 August 2007 (aged 94) Aldington, Kent, England
- Party: Conservative
- Spouse: Evelyn Branfort (died 2004)
- Children: 5
- Relatives: Wyndham Deedes (uncle); Drummond Money-Coutts (grandson); Sophia Money-Coutts (granddaughter)
- Education: Harrow School
- Military career
- Branch: British Army
- Service years: World War II
- Rank: Major
- Service number: 90126
- Awards: Military Cross

William Francis Deedes, Baron Deedes, KBE, MC, PC (1 June 1913 – 17 August 2007) was a British Conservative politician, army officer and journalist. He was the first person in Britain to have been both a member of the Cabinet and the editor of a major daily newspaper, The Daily Telegraph.

== Early life ==
Deedes was born in Hampstead in 1913, the second child and only son of landowner Herbert William Deedes and his wife Melesina Gladys, daughter of Philip Francis Chenevix Trench. His younger sister Margaret Melesina married the 21st Baron FitzWalter. He was brought up in the family home of Saltwood Castle until it was sold in 1925. He was educated at Harrow until after his father, who had struggled to manage the family's wealth for years, suffered heavy financial losses from the Wall Street crash of 1929 which eradicated their remaining fortunes.

== Journalism ==
Due to the lack of funds, Deedes was forced to leave school a year early and finish his exams with a tutor. After failing to get into a university, Deedes began his career as a reporter on the Morning Post in 1931, joining The Daily Telegraph when it took over the Post in 1937. Between 1931 and the beginning of the Second World War in 1939, he shared a home in Bethnal Green with his uncle Wyndham Deedes.

== War service ==
Deedes fought with the British Army in the Second World War, being based initially at Shrapnel Barracks in Woolwich as an officer in the 2nd Battalion, Queen's Westminsters, one of the Territorial Army (TA) units of the King's Royal Rifle Corps, into which he was commissioned in June 1939.

He gained the Military Cross near Hengelo, the Netherlands in April 1945. He rose to the rank of major and was the only officer to serve in 12th King's Royal Rifle Corps (2nd Queen's Westminsters) for the duration of the war. His battalion served as the motorised battalion of 8th Armoured Brigade in the North-west Europe campaign.

== Politics ==
Deedes came from a family with a tradition of public service. He was very proud of the fact that there had been a Deedes member of parliament in every century since 1600.

Deedes was elected as the Conservative Member of Parliament (MP) for Ashford in 1950. First serving as a junior minister under Winston Churchill for three years, he later entered Harold Macmillan's Cabinet in 1962 as Minister without Portfolio. He left the Cabinet in 1964, as Minister of Information, and subsequently stood down as an MP at the October 1974 election.

== Editorship and Fleet Street ==
Deedes was editor of The Daily Telegraph from 1974 to 1986 and, after he was replaced by Max Hastings, continued his career as a journalist. His tenure was noted for battles with the print unions.

After the 1999 Australian republic referendum, Deedes wrote in The Daily Telegraph: "I have rarely attended elections in any country, certainly not a democratic one, in which the newspapers have displayed more shameless bias. One and all, they determined that Australians should have a republic and they used every device towards that end."

He continued to comment on social and political issues through his newspaper columns until his death. In his later years, he gained a cult fanbase after two memorable appearances on Have I Got News for You and was, at the age of 88, the oldest guest ever to have appeared on the programme until 2012, when Baroness Trumpington appeared at the age of 90.

He was also a stalwart member of the Carlton Club and was appointed as an ambassador for UNICEF in 1998, running high-profile campaigns against landmines. In 2006, he wrote in an opinion piece for The Daily Telegraph that Islam "is the only faith on Earth that persuades its followers to seek political power and impose a law – sharia – which shapes everyone's style of life" and added that Islam "forbids" Muslims from conforming with British society. He continued to write into his 94th year, with his final article, published on 3 August 2007, about Darfur.

== Personal life ==
Deedes was married to Evelyn Hilary Branfoot, who died in May 2004, by whom he had two sons and three daughters. A convinced Christian like his father, he lived very unpretentiously on the edge of Romney Marsh, Kent, where his wife, Hilary, kept a menagerie of farm animals. He was never particularly well-off, preferring to use public transport whenever possible.

He was created a life peer on 23 September 1986, becoming Baron Deedes, of Aldington in the County of Kent, but he always preferred to be addressed as "Bill", rather than "Lord Deedes". He was the subject of This Is Your Life in 1998, when he was surprised by Michael Aspel.

== Death ==
Deedes died from bronchopneumonia at his home in Aldington on 17 August 2007, at the age of 94. There is a residential street named for him in the village, called Bill Deedes Way.

== Popular culture ==
=== Scoop ===
According to many sources, Deedes was the journalist used by Evelyn Waugh as the model and inspiration for the hapless William Boot, protagonist of the satirical novel Scoop. Deedes himself said he "spent part of my life brushing aside the charge", but admitted "that my inexperience and naivety as a reporter in Africa might have contributed a few bricks to the building of Boot." The two had reported together in 1936, trying to cover the Second Italo-Abyssinian War; Deedes arrived in Addis Ababa aged 22 with almost 600 pounds of luggage. Berhanu Kebele, Ethiopian ambassador to London, pointed out that Deedes's sharp journalistic instincts ensured Italian excesses were kept in the public eye.

Barring the question of age, a more appropriate model for Boot is William Beach Thomas who, according to Peter Stothard, "was a quietly successful countryside columnist and literary gent who became a calamitous Daily Mail war correspondent" in World War I.

=== "Dear Bill" ===
Deedes was close to Margaret Thatcher and her husband Denis. The spoof letters "from" Mr. Thatcher which appeared in satirical magazine Private Eye throughout the Thatcher years were always addressed to Dear Bill – the "Bill" in question was usually assumed to be Deedes; however some instalments (e.g. 16 May and 28 November 1986) would suggest otherwise. The two men regularly played golf together, with Deedes saying it was a public service to take the spouse of the Prime Minister away from the stress of being married to the country's head of government. The Eye also based its long-running editorial comment, "Shome mishtake shurely?", on Deedes' distinctive slur.

== Publications ==
- Swift and Bold: The Story of the King's Royal Rifle Corps in the Second World War 1939-1945, coedited with Sir Hereward Wake, Aldershot: Gale & Polden, 1949
- At War with Waugh: The Real Story of "Scoop", Macmillan, 2003 ISBN 1-4050-0573-4
- Brief Lives, Macmillan, 2004 ISBN 0-330-42639-7
- Dear Bill: A Memoir, Macmillan, 2005 ISBN 1-4050-5266-X
- Words and Deedes: Selected Journalism 1931-2006, Macmillan, 2006, ISBN 1-4050-5396-8

== Arms ==
Coat of arms of Bill Deedes
Crest An Eagle's Head erased per fess nebuly Gules and Argent between two Wings expanded Sable Escutcheon Per fess nebuly Gules and Argent three Martlets counterchanged

== Notes ==
Parliament of the United Kingdom
Preceded by Edward Percy Smith	Member of Parliament for Ashford; 1950–1974	Succeeded by Keith Speed
Political offices
Preceded by Ernest Marples	Parliamentary Secretary to the Ministry of Housing and Local Government; 1954–1955	Succeeded by Enoch Powell
Preceded by The Lord Mills	Minister without Portfolio; 1962–1964	Succeeded by Eric Fletcher
Media offices
Preceded by Maurice Green	Editor of The Daily Telegraph; 1974–1986	Succeeded by Max Hastings
