= Dear Bill =

Feature in the British satirical magazine Private Eye

DVD sleeve artwork for Anyone For Denis?

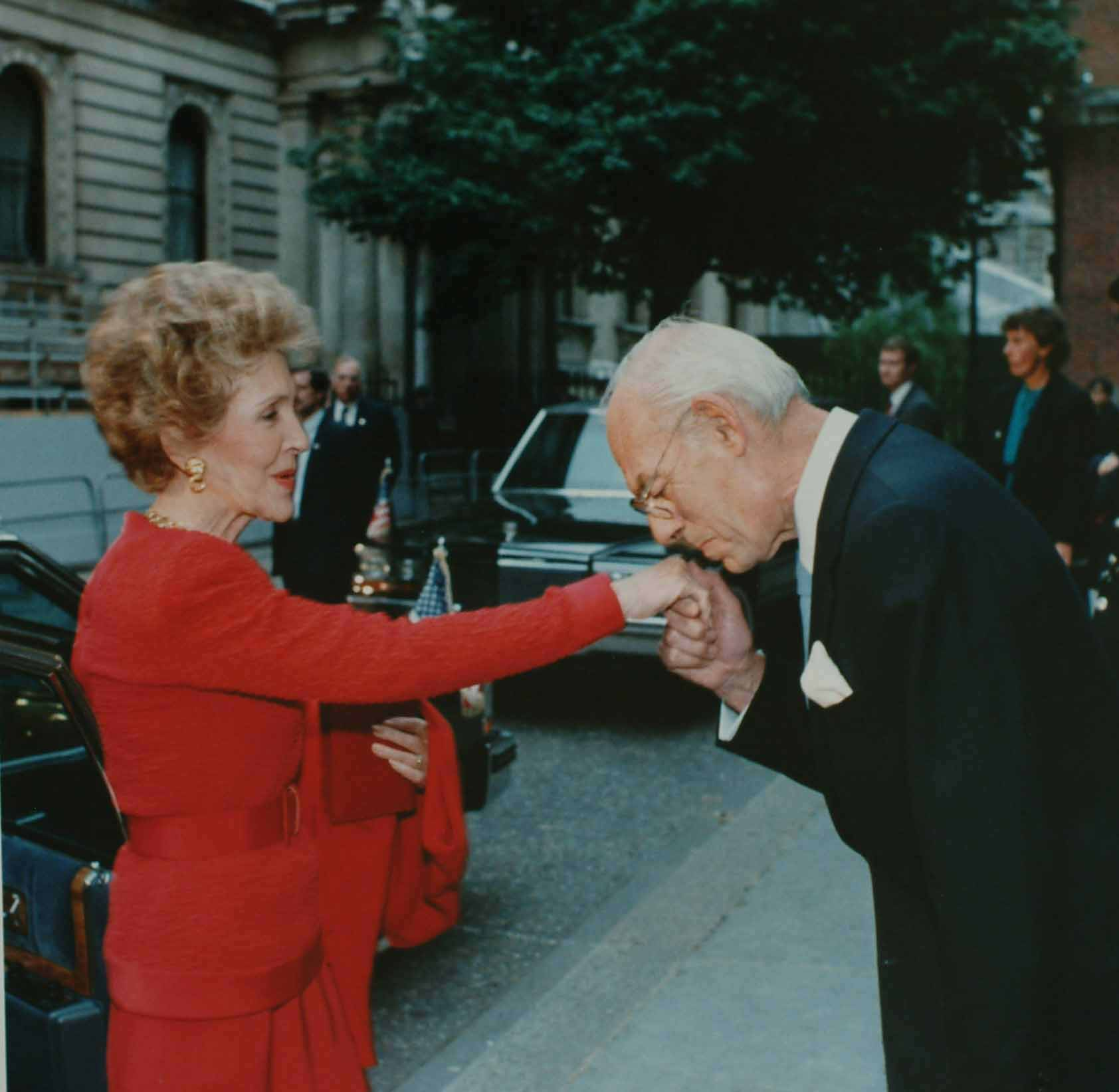
Denis Thatcher greeting Nancy Reagan in 1988, characteristically described by the letters as "obliged to turn out for Red Carpet duty, i.e. return of Conquering Hero and emaciated spouse at Heathrow..."

The "Dear Bill" letters were a regular feature in the British satirical magazine Private Eye, purporting to be the private correspondence of Denis Thatcher, husband of the then-Prime Minister, Margaret Thatcher. It was written by Richard Ingrams and John Wells, and illustrated with sketches by George Adamson for the first five years, and subsequently by Brian Bagnall.

The series took the form of fortnightly letters to "Bill" by his friend and golfing partner "Denis". The letters were split equally between reactionary grumblings about the state of the country and vituperative comments on contemporary politics, with regular passing references to the goings-on of a fictional collection of acquaintances and the consumption of a quite remarkable quantity of "electric soup". "Bill", whilst never identified as such in the series, was often taken as being Denis Thatcher's close friend Bill Deedes; Deedes later titled his autobiography Dear Bill: a memoir.

The series ran throughout the Thatcher government, first appearing two weeks after Margaret Thatcher was elected. It spawned a number of annual editions of the collected letters, one for each year, and even a stage play, Anyone for Denis?, with creator John Wells playing the title role. A television adaptation of the same name by Thames Television was broadcast in 1982.

The concept of writing satire from the point of view of a Prime Ministerial spouse was not new to the magazine, who had published Mrs Wilson's Diary (also a collaboration between Wells and Ingrams) along the same line during the Wilson government. It allowed the writers wide rein to comment on the personal peculiarities of senior politicians without seeming overly absurd, and was presented in a context that was – whilst clearly fictional – quite plausible. The assumed characteristics of the subject – a conservative reactionary, a "buffer's buffer" surveying the world through the bottom of a glass and not liking it one inch – gave ample opportunity for a rich and identifiable style; the image of Denis portrayed in the letters – a gin-soaked half-witted layabout, whose sole activity was to try to escape the wrath of "the Boss" – was a popular one, and Denis Thatcher remained in the public imagination as a less gaffe-prone version of the Duke of Edinburgh long after both the Thatcher government and the series itself had ended. The portrayal was not entirely negative; Denis Thatcher was portrayed as having a sharp and witty tongue, and a keen eye for events around him.

Whilst the letters may not have represented the real Denis Thatcher, they represented the Denis Thatcher their readers believed in. The poet Philip Larkin described the letters as consolidating "an imaginative reality that is more convincing than the morning papers" in an Observer review, and John Wells once argued that he had done more than every Downing Street publicist to endear the Thatchers to the British public. They played a major part in fashioning Denis Thatcher's popular public image.

Bill Deedes, along with the Thatchers' daughter Carol, argued that Denis himself played up to this image – by encouraging the portrayal of himself as a harmlessly incompetent buffoon, he could deflect any claims that he was manipulating government from "behind the throne".

== Bibliography ==
Dear Bill (1980) cover drawing by George Adamson

In addition to being published fortnightly in Private Eye, a series of collections were published:

1. Richard Ingrams and John Wells, ill. by George Adamson (1980). Dear Bill: The collected letters of Denis Thatcher. Private Eye Productions. ISBN 0-233-97303-6. (Letters from 18 May 1979 – 25 April 1980)
2. Richard Ingrams and John Wells, ill. by George Adamson (1981). The Other Half: Further letters of Denis Thatcher. Private Eye Productions. ISBN 0-233-97420-2. (Letters from 9 May 1980 – 24 April 1981)
3. Richard Ingrams and John Wells, ill. by George Adamson (1982). One for the Road. Private Eye Productions. ISBN 0-233-97511-X. (Letters from 24 April 1981 – 23 April 1982)
4. Richard Ingrams and John Wells, ill. by George Adamson (1983). My Round!. Private Eye Productions. ISBN 0-233-97607-8. (Letters from 7 May 1982 – 22 April 1983)
5. Richard Ingrams and John Wells, ill. by George Adamson (1984). Bottoms Up! Further letters of Denis Thatcher. Private Eye Productions. ISBN 0-233-97701-5. (Letters from 6 May 1983 – 4 May 1984)
6. Richard Ingrams and John Wells, ill. by Brian Bagnall (1985). Down the hatch!. Private Eye Productions. ISBN 0-233-97812-7.
7. Richard Ingrams and John Wells, ill. by Brian Bagnall (1986). Just the one. Private Eye Productions. ISBN 0-233-97984-0. (Letters from 12 July 1985 – 30 May 1986)
8. Richard Ingrams and John Wells, ill. by Brian Bagnall (1987). Mud in your eye!. Private Eye Productions. ISBN 0-233-98146-2. (Letters from 27 June 1986 – 29 May 1987)
9. Richard Ingrams and John Wells, ill. by Brian Bagnall (1988). Still going strong. Private Eye Productions. ISBN 0-233-98336-8. (Letters from 12 June 1987 – 10 June 1988)
10. Richard Ingrams and John Wells, ill. by Brian Bagnall (1989). Number 10. Private Eye Productions. ISBN 0-233-98477-1. (Letters from 24 June 1987 – 26 May 1989)
11. Richard Ingrams and John Wells, ill. by Brian Bagnall (1990). On and on? Further Letters of Denis Thatcher. Private Eye Productions. ISBN 0-552-13750-2. (Letters from 9 June 1989 – 25 May 1990)
