= Richard Ingrams =

English journalist

- Born: Richard Reid Ingrams; 19 August 1937 (age 89); London, England
- Education: University College, Oxford (BA)
- Occupations: Journalist, author, satirist
- Known for: Co-founder and second editor of Private Eye; founding editor of The Oldie
- Spouse: Sara Soudain (m. 2011)
- Children: 3
- Relatives: Leonard Ingrams (brother)

Richard Reid Ingrams (born 19 August 1937) is an English journalist, a co-founder and second editor of the British satirical magazine Private Eye, and founding editor of The Oldie magazine. He left the latter job at the end of May 2014.

== Early life and education ==
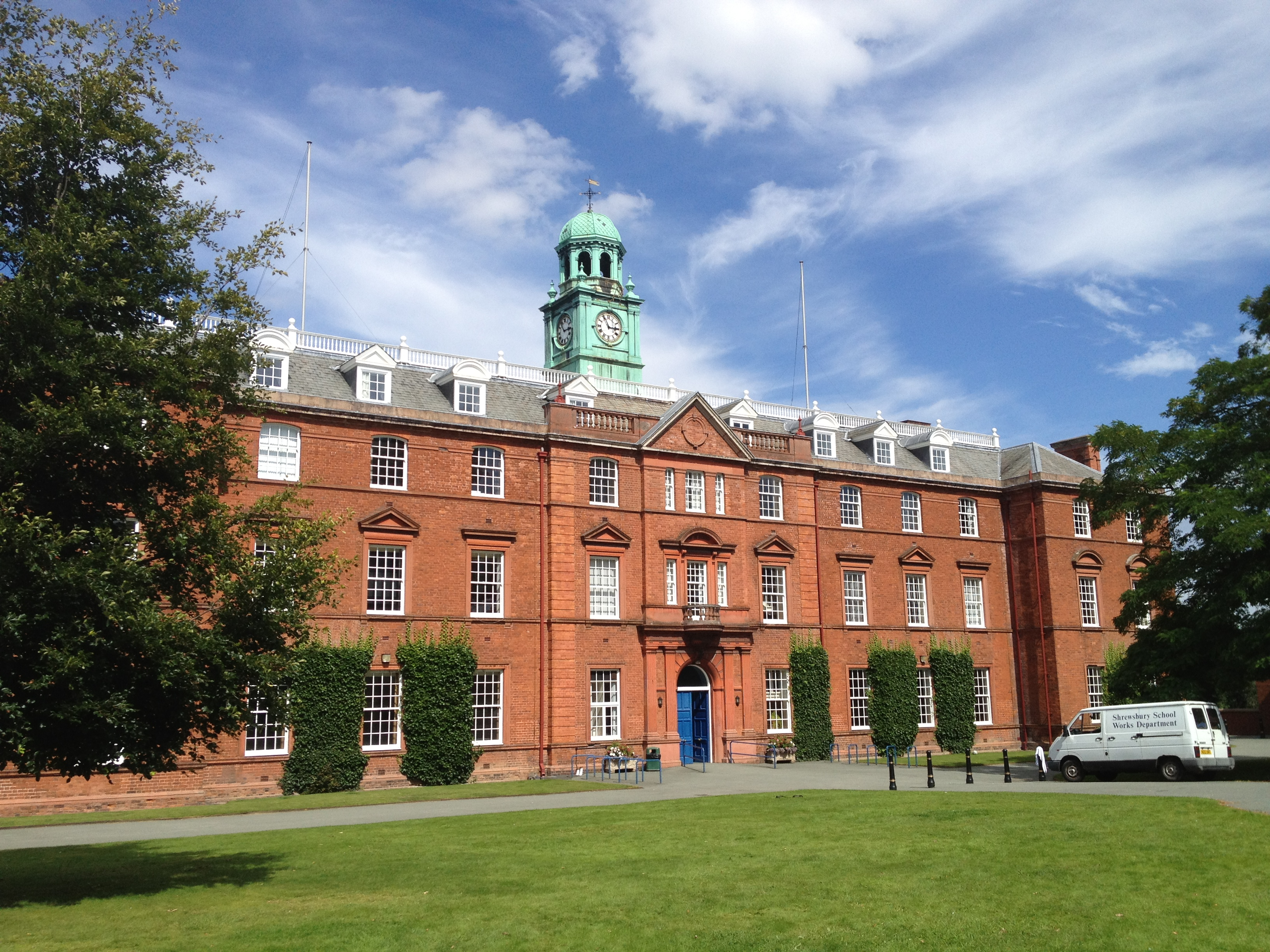
Shrewsbury School

Ingrams's parents, who had three other sons including the banker and opera impresario Leonard Ingrams, were Leonard St Clair Ingrams (1900–1953), an investment banker from a clergy family who worked as a government official in propaganda, economic warfare and the secret services during World War II, and Victoria, the daughter of Sir James Reid, private physician to Queen Victoria. Through his maternal grandmother and her ties to the Baring family, Ingrams is a direct descendant of the 19th-century prime minister Charles Grey.

Ingrams was educated at the independent preparatory school West Downs in Winchester, Hampshire, followed by Shrewsbury School, where he met Willie Rushton and edited the school magazine. Before attending Oxford, he did his National Service in the Royal Army Educational Corps; he served in the army ranks after failing his interview for officer training, something which was unusual for someone from his background at the time. At University College, Oxford, where he read Classics, he shared tutorials with Robin Butler, later cabinet secretary and sometimes referred to as a "pillar of the Establishment". Ingrams also met Paul Foot, another former Shrewsbury pupil, not yet the left-wing radical he became, who became a lifelong friend and whose biography Ingrams wrote after Foot's death.

== Career ==
Along with several other Old Salopians, including Willie Rushton, Ingrams founded Private Eye in 1962, taking over the editorship from Christopher Booker in 1963. It was a classic case, he claimed on Desert Island Discs in 2008, of the "old boy network". Private Eye was part of the satire boom of the early 1960s, which included the television show That Was The Week That Was, for which Ingrams wrote, and The Establishment nightclub, run by Peter Cook. When Private Eye ran into financial problems Cook was able to gain a majority shareholding on the proceeds of his brief but financially successful venture.

Ingrams vacated the editor's chair at the Eye in 1986, when Ian Hislop took over. In 1992 Ingrams created and became editor of The Oldie, a now monthly humorous lifestyle and issues magazine mainly aimed at the older generation. As of 2005, he was still chairman of Private Eye, working there every Monday, spending four days a week in London.

He was television critic for The Spectator from 1976 to 1984, though he rarely showed much enthusiasm for the medium. He was a regular on the radio panel quiz The News Quiz for its first twenty years and contributed a column to The Observer for eighteen years. In late 2005 he moved to The Independent, considering The Observer to have gone downhill, particularly as a consequence of its support for the Iraq war. In his 27 August 2011 column, he announced that he had been sacked by the newly appointed editor of The Independent. Shortly after the death of Jimmy Savile, Ingrams' The Oldie was the first publication to break the story of Savile's history of child abuse, after several national newspapers had been unwilling to print it.

After a series of clashes with James Pembroke, owner and publisher of The Oldie, Ingrams left the magazine at the end of May 2014 having resigned as editor. His most recent book is a biography of Ludovic Kennedy.

== Personal life ==
Ingrams married Mary Morgan on 24 November 1962; they had three children: a son, Fred, who is an artist; a second son, Arthur, who was disabled and died in childhood; and a daughter, Margaret ("Jubby") a mother of three who died in 2004, aged 39, of a heroin overdose in Brighton.

Ingrams played the organ for many years in his local Anglican church in Aldworth, Berkshire, each Sunday. The Romney Marsh Historic Churches Trust was formed under the patronage of Ingrams and the then Archbishop of Canterbury, Robert Runcie. In 2011 he announced he had converted to Roman Catholicism.

Ingrams currently lives in Berkshire with his wife (who is also his god-daughter) Sara, a medical researcher. Before they married in 2011, Ingrams had a "long-term partner, Debbie Bosley, a waitress-turned novelist 27 years his junior".

His sister-in-law (wife of his late brother Rupert, a publisher) was Davina Ingrams, 18th Baroness Darcy de Knayth; his nephew Caspar is the present baron.

A biography, Richard Ingrams: Lord of the Gnomes (ISBN 0-434-77828-1) by Harry Thompson, was published in 1994. In 2020, his life was encapsulated in a satirical mock-autobiography, "Richard Ingrams Writes his Memoirs", published in The Fence.

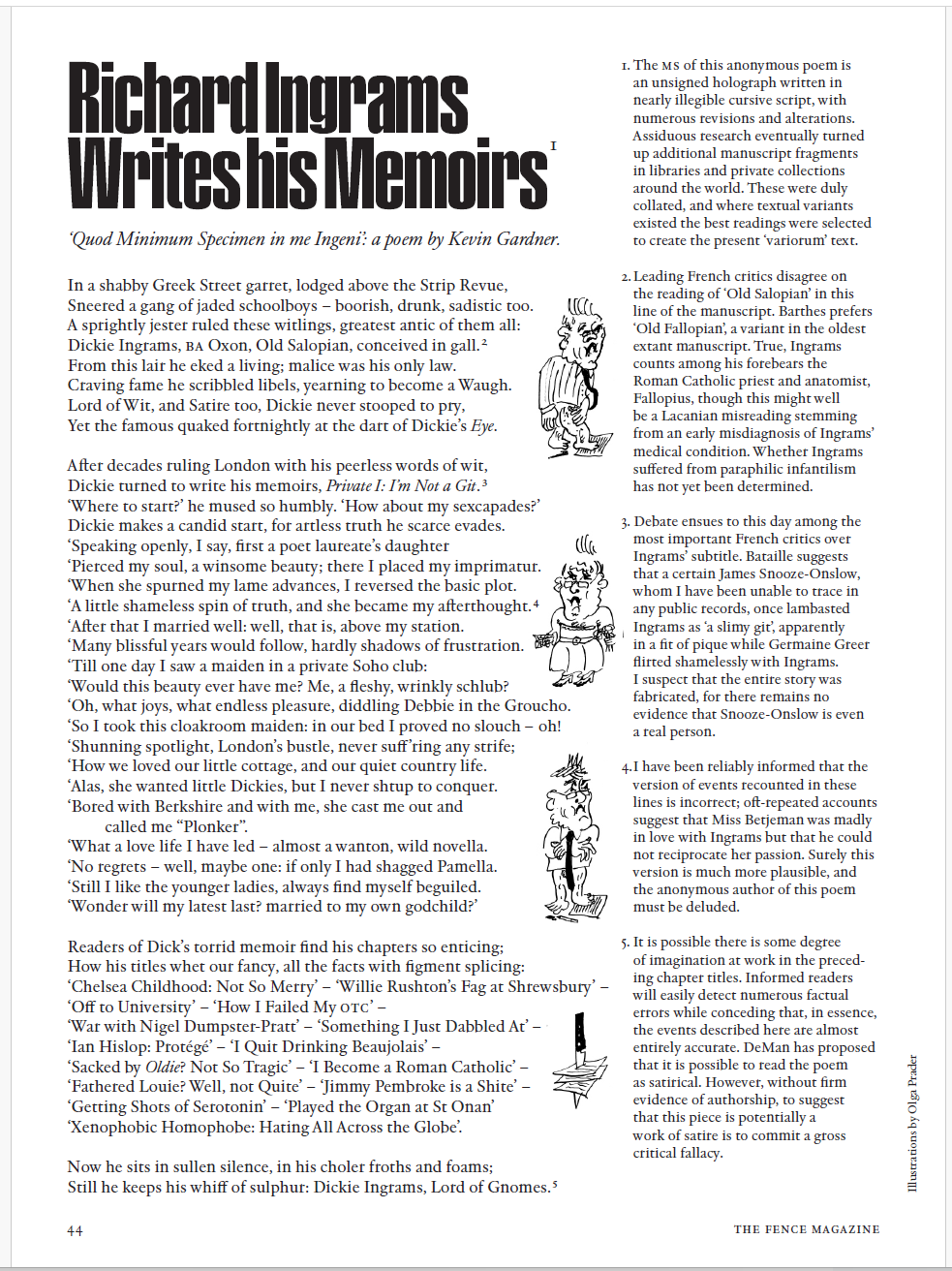
Richard Ingrams Writes His Memoirs

== Books by Ingrams ==
=== As author ===
- Mrs. Wilson's Diary (with John Wells, illustrated by William Rushton), 1965
- Mrs. Wilson's 2nd Diary (with John Wells, illustrated by William Rushton), 1966
- Mrs. Wilson's Diaries (with John Wells), 1967
- The Tale of Driver Grope (with Ralph Steadman), 1969
- The Bible for Motorists: By Old Jowett (with Barry Fantoni), 1970
- Harris in Wonderland: By Philip Reid (pseudonym of Ingrams and Andrew Osmond), 1973
- God's Apology: A Chronicle of Three Friends, 1977
- Goldenballs, 1979
- Dear Bill: The Collected Letters of Denis Thatcher (with John Wells), 1980
- Romney Marsh and the Royal Military Canal (with Fay Godwin), 1980
- The Other Half: Further Letters of Denis Thatcher (with John Wells), 1981
- One for the Road (with John Wells), 1982, (ISBN 978-0233975115)
- Piper's Places: John Piper in England & Wales (with John Piper), 1983, (ISBN 978-0701125509)
- My Round! (with John Wells), 1983, (ISBN 978-0233976075)
- Bottoms Up! (with John Wells), 1984, (ISBN 978-0233977010)
- Down the Hatch! (with John Wells), 1985, (ISBN 978-0233978123)
- John Stewart Collis: A Memoir, 1986, (ISBN 978-0701129767)
- Just the One (with John Wells), 1986, (ISBN 978-0233979847)
- The Best of "Dear Bill" (with John Wells), 1986, (ISBN 978-0747400264)
- Mud in Your Eye! (with John Wells), 1987, (ISBN 978-0233981468)
- You Might as Well be Dead, 1988, (ISBN 978-0954817671)
- Still Going Strong (with John Wells), 1988, (ISBN 978-0233983363)
- The Ridgeway: Europe's Oldest Road, 1988, (ISBN 978-0714825069)
- Number 10 (with John Wells]), 1989, (ISBN 978-0233984773)
- On and On (with John Wells), 1990, (ISBN 978-0552137508)
- Muggeridge: The Biography, 1995, (ISBN 978-0062513649)
- My Friend Footy: A Memoir of Paul Foot, 2005, (ISBN 978-1901784428)
- The Life and Adventures of William Cobbett, 2005, (ISBN 978-0006388258)
- Quips and Quotes: A Journalist's Commonplace Book, 2011, (ISBN 978-1901170160)
- Ludo and the Power of the Book: Ludovic Kennedy's Campaigns for Justice, 2017, (ISBN 978-1472109071)
- The Sins of G. K. Chesterton, 2021, (ISBN 978-1905128334)

=== As compiler and editor ===
- What the Papers Never Meant to Say: "Private Eye's" Second Book of Boobs, 1968
- The Life and Times of Private Eye 1961–1971, 1971
- Beachcomber: The Works of J. B. Morton, 1974
- Cobbett's Country Book: An Anthology of William Cobbett's Writings on Country Matters, 1974
- "Private Eye's" Book of Pseuds: A Mood Statement, 1975
- "Private Eye's" Second Book of Pseuds, 1977
- The Penguin Book of Private Eye Cartoons, 1983
- Dr Johnson by Mrs Thrale: The "Anecdotes" of Mrs Piozzi in Their Original Form, 1984
- England: An Anthology, 1989
- The Bumper Beachcomber, 1991
- The Oldie Book of Cartoons, 1996
- More Cartoons, 1996
- I Once Met: Fifty Encounters with the Famous, 1996
- Jesus: Authors Take Sides: An Anthology, 1999
- The Oldie Book of Cartoons, 1992–2009, 2009
- The Oldie Book of Cartoons: A New Selection, 2013

Media offices
Preceded by Christopher Booker	Editor of Private Eye; 1963–1986	Succeeded by Ian Hislop
