= Private Eye =

British satirical and current affairs magazine

Coordinates: 51.51485°N 0.13372°W

- A July 2011 cover following the closure of the News of the World, making ironic use of a 1982 headline from The Sun
- Editor: Ian Hislop
- Categories: Satirical news magazine
- Frequency: Fortnightly
- Circulation: ▼232,638 (Jul–Dec 2024)
- Founded: 1961; 65 years ago
- Company: Pressdram Ltd
- Based in: London W1; United Kingdom
- Language: English
- Website: www.private-eye.co.uk
- ISSN: 0032-888X

Private Eye is a British fortnightly satirical and current affairs news magazine, founded in 1961. It is published in London and has been edited by Ian Hislop since 1986. The publication is widely recognised for its prominent criticism and lampooning of public figures. It is also known for its in-depth investigative journalism into under-reported scandals and cover-ups.

Private Eye is Britain's best-selling current affairs news magazine, and such is its long-term popularity and impact that many of its recurring in-jokes have entered popular culture in the United Kingdom. The privately owned magazine bucks the trend of declining circulation for print media, having recorded its highest-ever circulation in 2016 of over 287,000 for that year's Christmas edition.

With a "deeply conservative resistance to change", it has resisted moves to online content or a glossy format: it has always been printed on cheap paper and resembles, in format and content, a comic rather than a serious magazine. Both its satire and investigative journalism have led to numerous libel suits. It is known for the use of pseudonyms by its contributors, many of whom have been prominent in public life—this even extends to a fictional proprietor, Lord Gnome.

== History ==
The forerunner of Private Eye was The Walopian, an underground magazine published at Shrewsbury School by pupils in the mid-1950s and edited by Richard Ingrams, Willie Rushton, Christopher Booker and Paul Foot. The Walopian (a play on the school magazine name The Salopian) mocked school spirit, traditions and the masters. After National Service, Ingrams and Foot went as undergraduates to Oxford University, where they met future collaborators including Peter Usborne, Andrew Osmond and John Wells.

The magazine was properly begun when they learned of a new printing process, photo-litho offset, which meant that anybody with a typewriter and Letraset could produce a magazine. The publication was initially funded by Osmond and launched in 1961. It is agreed that Osmond suggested the title, and sold many of the early copies in person, in London pubs.

The magazine was initially edited by Booker and designed by Rushton, who drew cartoons for it. Usborne was its first managing director. Its subsequent editor, Ingrams, who was then pursuing a career as an actor, shared the editorship with Booker from around issue number 10 and took over from issue 40. At first, Private Eye was a vehicle for juvenile jokes: an extension of the original school magazine, and an alternative to Punch.

Peter Cook—who in October 1961 founded The Establishment, the first satirical nightclub in London—purchased Private Eye in 1962, together with Nicholas Luard, and was a long-time contributor. Others essential to the development of the magazine were Auberon Waugh, Claud Cockburn (who had run a pre-war scandal sheet, The Week), Barry Fantoni, Gerald Scarfe, Tony Rushton, Patrick Marnham and Candida Betjeman. Christopher Logue was another long-time contributor, providing the column "True Stories", featuring cuttings from the national press. The gossip columnist Nigel Dempster wrote extensively for the magazine before he fell out with Ian Hislop and other writers, while Foot wrote on politics, local government and corruption. The receptionist and general factotum from 1984 to 2014 was Hilary Lowinger.

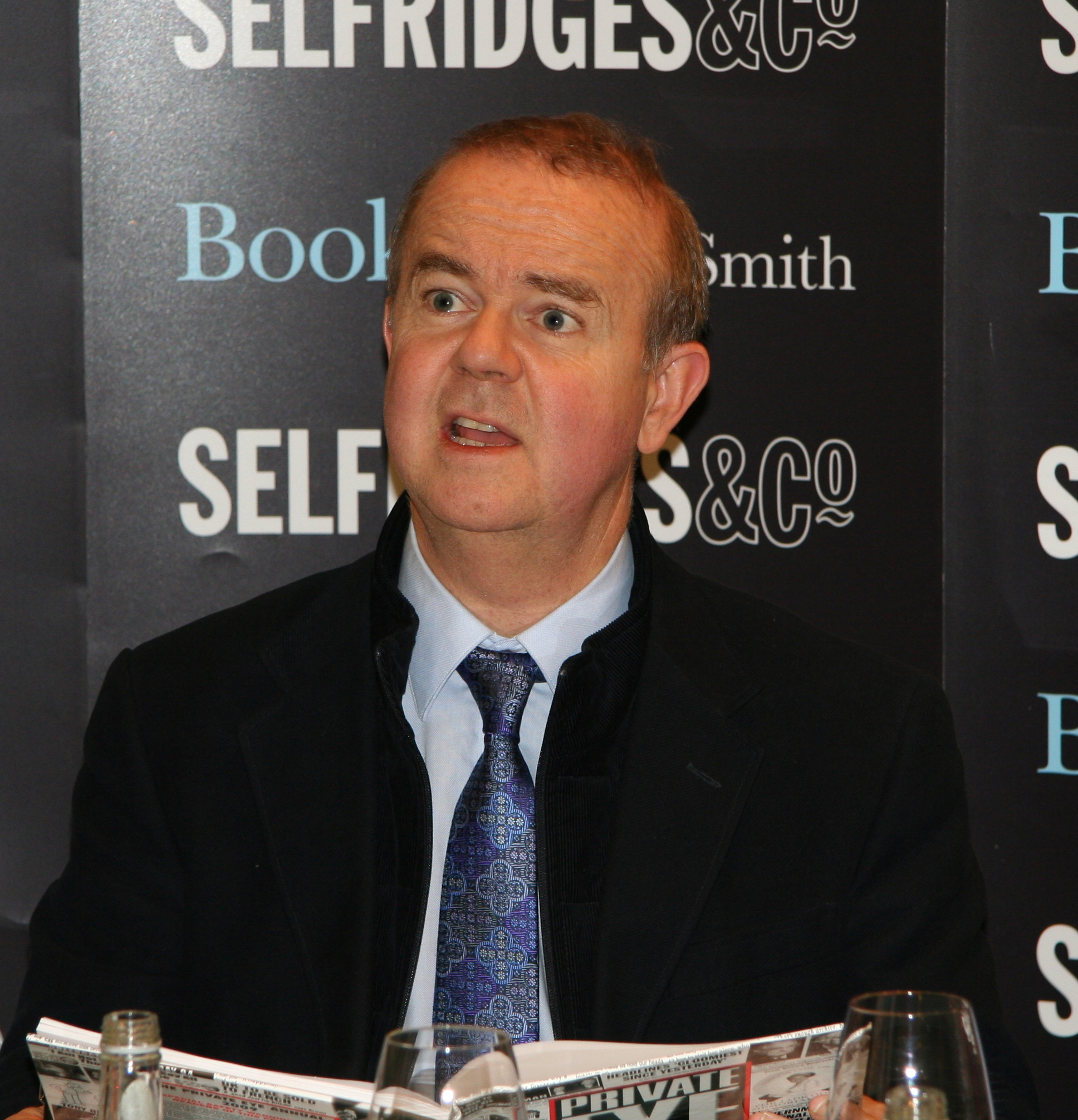
Ian Hislop at an Eye book launch in 2009

Ingrams continued as editor until 1986 when he was succeeded by Hislop. Ingrams remains chairman of the holding company.

== Style ==
Private Eye often reports on the misdeeds of powerful and important individuals and, consequently, has received numerous libel writs throughout its history. These include three issued by James Goldsmith (known in the magazine as "(Sir) Jammy Fishpaste" and "Jonah Jammy fingers") and several by Robert Maxwell (known as "Captain Bob"), one of which resulted in the award of costs and reported damages of £225,000, and attacks on the magazine by Maxwell through a book, Malice in Wonderland, and a one-off magazine, Not Private Eye. Its defenders point out that it often carries news that the mainstream press will not print for fear of legal reprisals or because the material is of minority interest.

As well as covering a wide range of current affairs, Private Eye is also known for highlighting the errors and hypocritical behaviour of newspapers in the "Street of Shame" column, named after Fleet Street, the former home of many papers. It reports on parliamentary and national political issues, with regional and local politics covered in equal depth under the "Rotten Boroughs" column (named after the rotten boroughs of the pre-Reform Act 1832 House of Commons). Extensive investigative journalism is published under the "In the Back" section, often tackling cover-ups and unreported scandals. A financial column called "In the City" (referring to the City of London), written by Michael Gillard under the pseudonym "Slicker", has exposed several significant financial scandals and described unethical business practices.

Some contributors to Private Eye are media figures or specialists in their field who write anonymously, often under humorous pseudonyms, such as "Dr B Ching" (a reference to the Beeching cuts) who writes the "Signal Failures" column about the railways. Stories sometimes originate from writers for more mainstream publications who cannot get their stories published by their main employers.

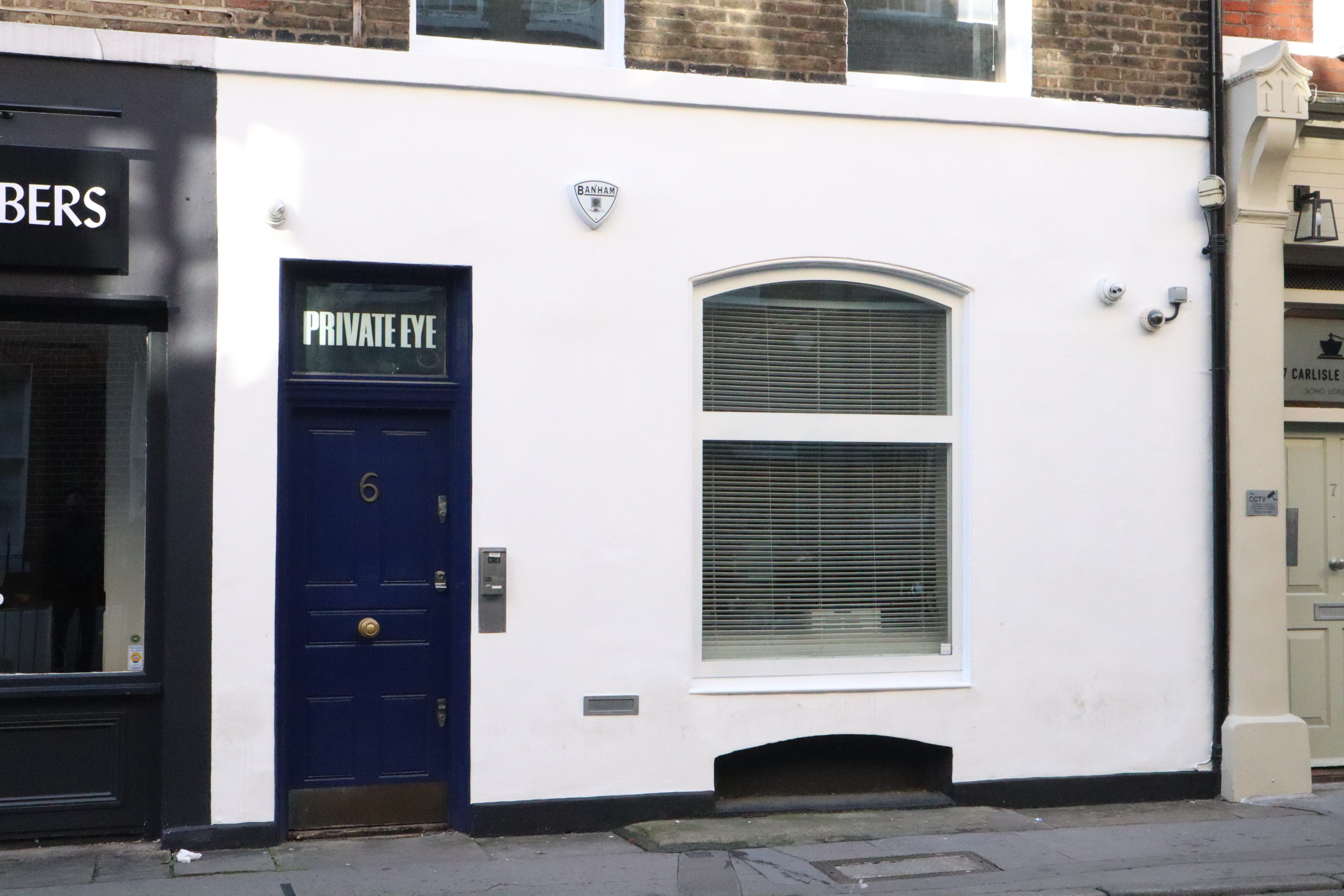
Private Eye headquarters at 6 Carlisle Street in Soho

Private Eye has traditionally lagged other magazines in adopting new typesetting and printing technologies. At the start, it was laid out with scissors and paste and typed on three IBM Electric typewriters in italics, pica and elite typewriter fonts, lending an amateurish look to the pages. For some years after layout tools became available the magazine retained this technique to maintain its look, although the three older typewriters were replaced with an IBM composer. Today the magazine is still predominantly in black and white (though the cover and some cartoons inside appear in colour) and there is more text and less white space than is typical for a modern magazine. Much of the text is printed in the standard Times New Roman font. The former "Colour Section" was printed in black and white like the rest of the magazine: only the content was colourful.

== Notable columns ==
A series of parody columns referring to the Prime Minister of the day has been a long-term feature of Private Eye. While satirical, during the 1980s, Ingrams and John Wells wrote an affectionate series of fictional letters from Denis Thatcher to Bill Deedes in the Dear Bill column, mocking Thatcher as an amiable, golf-playing drunk. The column was collected in a series of books and became a stage play ("Anyone for Denis?") in which Wells played the fictional Denis, a character now inextricably "blurred with the real historical figure", according to Ingrams.

In The Back is an investigative journalism section notably associated with journalist Paul Foot (the Eye has always published its investigative journalism at the back of the magazine). Private Eye was one of the journalistic organisations involved in sifting and analysing the Paradise Papers, and this commentary appears in In the Back.

Nooks and Corners (originally Nooks and Corners of the New Barbarism), an architectural column severely critical of architectural vandalism and "barbarism", notably modernism and brutalism, was originally founded by John Betjeman in 1971 (his first article attacked a building praised by his enemy Nikolaus Pevsner) and carried on by his daughter Candida Lycett Green. For four decades beginning in 1978, it was edited by Gavin Stamp under the pseudonym Piloti. The column notably features a discussion of the state of public architecture and especially the preservation (or otherwise) of Britain's architectural heritage.

Street of Shame is a column addressing journalistic misconduct and excesses, hypocrisy, and undue influence by proprietors and editors, mostly sourced from tipoffs—it sometimes serves as a venue for the settling of scores within the trade, and is a source of friction with editors. This work formed the basis of much of Ian Hislop's testimony to the Leveson Inquiry, and Leveson was complimentary about the magazine and the column. The term street of shame is a reference to Fleet Street, the former centre of British journalism, and has become synonymous with it.

The Rotten Boroughs column focuses on actual or alleged wrongdoing in local or regional governments and elections, for example, corruption, nepotism, hypocrisy and incompetence. The column's name derives from the 18th-century rotten boroughs.

Eye World is a set of three columns focused on global events. A central "... Watch" column, authored by "Dr Grim", discusses human rights abuses, while the "Letter from ..." and "Postcard from..." columns feature reports and commentary from uncredited foreign correspondents.

The long-running True Stories column, originally by Christopher Logue, features verified but surreal news items, from eccentric local crimes to bizarre public incidents. Funny Old World is a similar section comprising events found and submitted by readers.

There are also several recurring miniature sections.

== Special editions ==
The magazine has occasionally published special editions dedicated to the reporting of particular events, such as government inadequacy over the 2001 foot and mouth outbreak, the conviction in 2001 of Abdelbaset al-Megrahi for the 1988 Lockerbie bombing (an incident regularly covered since by "In the Back"), and the purported MMR vaccine controversy (since shown to be medical fraud committed by Andrew Wakefield) in 2002.

A special issue was published in 2004 to mark the death of long-time contributor Paul Foot. In 2005, The Guardian and Private Eye established the Paul Foot Award (referred to colloquially as the "Footy"), with an annual £10,000 prize fund, for investigative/campaigning journalism, in memory of Foot.

== In-jokes ==
The magazine has many recurring in-jokes and convoluted references, often comprehensible only to those who have read the magazine for many years. They include euphemisms designed to avoid the notoriously plaintiff-friendly English libel laws, such as replacing the word "drunk" with "tired and emotional", or using the phrase "Ugandan discussions" to denote illicit sexual exploits.

== Cartoons ==
As well as many one-off cartoons, Private Eye features several regular comic strips:

- Apparently by Mike Barfield – satirising day-to-day life or pop trends
- Celeb by Charles Peattie and Mark Warren, collectively known as Ligger – a strip about a celebrity rock star named Gary Bloke, which first appeared in 1987. A BBC sitcom version was spun off in 2002.
- Desperate Business by Modern Toss – stereotypes a range of professions, such as an estate agent showing a couple a minuscule house, with the caption: "It's a bit smaller than it looked on your website".
- EUphemisms by RGJ – features a European Union bureaucrat making a statement, with a caption suggesting what it means in real terms, depicting the EU in a negative or hypocritical light. For example, an EU official declares: "Punishing Britain for Brexit would show the world we've lost the plot", with the caption reading: "We're going to punish Britain for Brexit. We've lost the plot".
- Fallen Angels – a regular cartoon with a caption depicting problems (often bureaucratic) in the National Health Service
- First Drafts by Simon Pearsell – original drafts of popular books
- Forgotten Moments in Music History – features cryptic references to notable songs and performers.
- It's Grim Up North London by Knife and Packer – a satire about Islington "trendies" which has been featured since 1999.
- Logos as They Should Be – a satire of logos from some of the world's most-known companies
- The Premiersh*ts by Paul Wood – a satire of professional football and footballers, in the Premier League
- Snipcock & Tweed by Nick Newman – about two book publishers
- Supermodels by Neil Kerber – satirising the lifestyle of supermodels; the characters are unfeasibly thin.
- Yobs and Yobettes by Tony Husband – satirising yob culture, featuring since the late 1980s
- Young British Artists by Birch – a spoof of the Young British Artists movement such as Tracey Emin and Damien Hirst

Some of the magazine's former cartoon strips include:

- The Adventures of Mr Millibean – former Leader of the Opposition, Ed Miliband, is portrayed as Rowan Atkinson's Mr. Bean
- Andy Capp-in-Ring – a parody of Andy Capp, satirising Labour leadership candidate Andy Burnham and his rivals, portraying Burnham as Capp
- Barry McKenzie – a strip in the mid-1960s detailing the adventures of an expatriate Australian in Earl's Court, London and elsewhere, written by Barry Humphries and drawn by Nicholas Garland
- Battle for Britain – a satire of British politics (1983–87) in terms of a World War II war comic
- The Broon-ites – a pastiche of the Scottish cartoon strip The Broons, featuring Gordon Brown and his close associates. The speech bubbles are written in broad Scots.
- Dan Dire, Pilot of the Future? and Tony Blair, Pilot for the Foreseeable Future – parodies of the Dan Dare comics of the 1950s, satirising (respectively) Neil Kinnock's time as Labour leader, and Tony Blair's Labour government
- Dave Snooty and his New Pals – drawn in the style of The Beano, it parodied David Cameron as "Dave Snooty" (a reference to the Beano character "Lord Snooty"), involved in public schoolboy-type behaviour with members of his cabinet. Cameron is portrayed as wearing an Eton College uniform with bow tie, tailcoat, waistcoat and pinstriped trousers.
- The Directors by Dredge & Rigg – commented on the excesses of boardroom fat cats.
- The Cloggies by Bill Tidy – about clogging dancers
- The Commuters by Grizelda – followed the efforts of two commuters to get a train to work.
- Global Warming: The Plus Side – a satire of the effects of global warming, suggesting mock "positive" impacts of the phenomena, such as bus-sized marrows in village vegetable competitions, vastly decreased fossil prices due to melting permafrost, and the proliferation of British citrus orchards
- Gogglebollox by Goddard – a satirical take on recent television shows
- Great Bores of Today by Michael Heath
- The Has-Beano – a pastiche of The Beano used to satirise The Spectator and Boris Johnson (who features as the lead character, Boris the Menace)
- Hom Sap by David Austin
- Liz – a cartoon about the Royal Family drawn by Cutter Perkins and RGJ in the style of the comic magazine Viz (with the speech in Geordie dialect). Ran from issue 801 to 833.
- Meet the Clintstones – The Prehistoric First Family – drawn in the style of The Flintstones, this was a parody of Bill and Hillary Clinton during his presidency and the 2008 US presidential election.
- Off Your Trolley by Reeve & Way – is set in an NHS hospital.
- The Regulars also by Michael Heath – is based on the drinking scene at the Coach and Horses pub in London (a regular meeting place for the magazine's staff and guests), and features the catchphrase "Jeff bin in?" (a reference to pub regular, the journalist Jeffrey Bernard).
- Scenes You Seldom See by Barry Fantoni – satirising the habits of British people by portraying the opposite of what is the accepted norm.

At various times, Private Eye has also used the work of Ralph Steadman, Wally Fawkes, Timothy Birdsall, Martin Honeysett, Willie Rushton, Gerald Scarfe, Robert Thompson, Ken Pyne, Geoff Thompson, "Jorodo", Ed McLachlan, Simon Pearsall, Kevin Woodcock, Brian Bagnall, Kathryn Lamb and George Adamson.

== Other products ==
Private Eye has, from time to time, produced various spin-offs from the magazine, including:

- Books, e.g. annuals, cartoon collections and investigative pamphlets
- Audio recordings
- Private Eye TV, a 1971 BBC TV version of the magazine
- Memorabilia and commemorative products, such as Christmas cards

== Criticism and controversy ==
=== Diana, Princess of Wales ===
The front cover of the "Diana issue", number 932, in September 1997

Some have found the magazine's irreverence and sometimes controversial humour offensive. Following the death of Diana, Princess of Wales in 1997, Private Eye printed a cover headed "Media to blame". Under this headline was a picture of many hundreds of people outside Buckingham Palace, with one person commenting that the papers were "a disgrace", another agreeing, saying that it was impossible to get one anywhere, and another saying, "Borrow mine. It's got a picture of the car."

Following the abrupt change in reporting from newspapers immediately following her death, the issue also featured a mock retraction from "all newspapers" of everything negative that they had ever said about Diana. This was enough to cause a flood of complaints and the temporary removal of the magazine from the shelves of some newsagents. These included WHSmith, which had previously refused to stock Private Eye until well into the 1970s and was characterised in the magazine as "WH Smugg" or "WH Smut" on account of its policy of stocking pornographic magazines.

=== Other complaints ===
The issues that followed the Ladbroke Grove rail crash in 1999 (number 987), the September 11 attacks of 2001 (number 1037; the magazine even included a special "subscription cancellation coupon" for disgruntled readers to send in) and the Soham murders of 2002 all attracted similar complaints. Following the 7/7 London bombings the magazine's cover (issue number 1137) featured Prime Minister Tony Blair saying to London mayor Ken Livingstone: "We must track down the evil mastermind behind the bombers...", to which Livingstone replies: "...and invite him around for tea", about his controversial invitation of the Islamic theologian Yusuf al-Qaradawi to London.

=== MMR vaccine ===
During the early 2000s Private Eye published many stories on the MMR vaccine controversy, supporting the interpretation by Andrew Wakefield of published research in The Lancet by the Royal Free Hospital's Inflammatory Bowel Disease Study Group, which described an apparent link between the vaccine and autism and bowel problems. Many of these stories accused medical researchers who supported the vaccine's safety of having conflicts of interest because of funding from the pharmaceutical industry.

Initially dismissive of Wakefield, the magazine rapidly moved to support him, in 2002 publishing a 32-page MMR Special Report that supported Wakefield's assertion that MMR vaccines "should be given individually at not less than one-year intervals". The British Medical Journal issued a contemporary press release that concluded: "The Eye report is dangerous in that it is likely to be read by people who are concerned about the safety of the vaccine. A doubting parent who reads this might be convinced there is a genuine problem, and the absence of any proper references will prevent them from checking the many misleading statements."

In a review article published in 2010, after Wakefield was disciplined by the General Medical Council, regular columnist Phil Hammond, who contributes to the "Medicine Balls" column under the pseudonym "MD", stated that: "Private Eye got it wrong in its coverage of MMR" in maintaining its support for Wakefield's position long after shortcomings in his work had emerged. In an interview with BBC Newsnight looking at the past 40 years of the magazine, Ian Hislop said MMR was one of things he got wrong as editor.

=== Accusations of hostility to unions ===
Senior figures in the trade union movement have accused the publication of having a classist anti-union bias, with Unite chief of staff Andrew Murray describing Private Eye as "a publication of assiduous public school boys" and adding that it has "never once written anything about trade unions that isn't informed by cynicism and hostility". The Socialist Worker also wrote that "For the past 50 years, the satirical magazine Private Eye has upset and enraged the powerful. Its mix of humour and investigation has tirelessly challenged the hypocrisy of the elite. ... But it also has serious weaknesses. Among the witty—if sometimes tired—spoof articles and cartoons, there is a nasty streak of snobbery and prejudice. Its jokes about the poor, women and young people rely on lazy stereotypes you might expect from the columns of the Daily Mail. It is the anti-establishment journal of the establishment."

=== Blasphemy ===
The 2004 Christmas issue received many complaints after it featured Pieter Bruegel's painting of a nativity scene, in which one wise man said to another: "Apparently, it's David Blunkett's" (who at the time was involved in a scandal in which he was thought to have impregnated a married woman). Many readers sent letters accusing the magazine of blasphemy and anti-Christian attitudes. One stated that the "witless, gutless buggers wouldn't dare mock Islam". It has, however, regularly published Islam-related humour such as the cartoon which portrayed a "Taliban careers master asking a pupil: What would you like to be when you blow up?".

Many letters in the first issue of 2005 disagreed with the former readers' complaints, and some were parodies of those letters, "complaining" about the following issue's cover—a cartoon depicting Santa's sleigh shredded by a wind farm: one said: "To use a picture of Our Lord Father Christmas and his Holy Reindeer being torn limb from limb while flying over a windfarm is inappropriate and blasphemous."

=== "Fake news" ===
In November 2016, Private Eye's official website appeared on a list of over 150 "fake news" websites compiled by Melissa Zimdars, a US lecturer. The site was listed as a source that is "purposefully fake with the intent of satire/comedy, which can offer important critical commentary on politics and society, but have the potential to be shared as actual/literal news." The Eye rejected any such classification, saying its site "contains none of these things, as the small selection of stories online are drawn from the journalism pages of the magazine", adding that "even US college students might recognise that the Headmistress's letter is not really from a troubled high school". Zimdars later removed the website from her list, after the Eye had contacted her for clarification.

=== Israel–Gaza war cover ===
In 2023, Private Eye published a satirical cover on the Gaza war, reading "This magazine may contain some criticism of the Israeli government and may suggest that killing everyone in Gaza as revenge for Hamas atrocities may not be a good long-term solution to the problems of the region." The magazine was both criticised and praised for its stance, with some accusing the magazine of antisemitism, while others called it brave for criticising the Israeli government. Critics condemned the magazine, while supporters defended its critique as not antisemitic but a legitimate questioning of the proportionality of Israel's response.

== Libel cases ==
As editor since 1986, Ian Hislop is listed in the Guinness Book of Records as the most sued man in English legal history. Private Eye has long been known for attracting libel lawsuits which, in English law, can easily lead to the award of damages. The publication "sets aside almost a quarter of its turnover for paying out in libel defeats" although the magazine frequently finds other ways to defuse legal tensions, such as by printing letters from aggrieved parties. From 1969 to the mid-1980s, the magazine was represented by human rights lawyer Geoffrey Bindman.

The writer Colin Watson was the first person to successfully sue Private Eye, objecting to being described as "the little-known author who ... was writing a novel, very Wodehouse but without jokes". He was awarded £750.

The cover of the tenth-anniversary issue in 1971 (number 257) showed a cartoon headstone inscribed with an extensive list of well-known names, and the epitaph: "They did not sue in vain".

In the 1971 case of Arkell v Pressdram, Arkell's lawyers wrote a letter which concluded: "His attitude to damages will be governed by the nature of your reply." Private Eye responded: "We acknowledge your letter of 29th April referring to Mr J. Arkell. We note that Mr Arkell's attitude to damages will be governed by the nature of our reply and would therefore be grateful if you would inform us what his attitude to damages would be, were he to learn that the nature of our reply is as follows: fuck off." Arkell dropped the complaint. The magazine has since used this exchange as a euphemism for a blunt and coarse dismissal, i.e.: "We refer you to the reply given in the case of Arkell v. Pressdram". As with "tired and emotional" this usage has spread beyond the magazine.

In 1976 James Goldsmith brought criminal libel charges against the magazine, meaning that if found guilty, editor Richard Ingrams and the author of the article, Patrick Marnham, could be imprisoned. He sued over allegations that he had conspired with the Clermont Set to assist Lord Lucan to evade the police, who wanted him in connection with the murder of his children's nanny. Goldsmith won a partial victory and eventually settled with the magazine. The case threatened to bankrupt Private Eye, which turned to its readers for financial support in the form of a "Goldenballs Fund". Goldsmith was referred to as "Jaws". Goldsmith's solicitor Peter Carter-Ruck was involved in many litigation cases against Private Eye; the magazine refers to his firm as "Carter-Fuck".

Robert Maxwell won a significant sum from the magazine when he sued over their suggestion that he looked like a criminal. Hislop claimed that his summary of the case: "I've just given a fat cheque to a fat Czech" was the only example of a joke being told on News at Ten.

Sonia Sutcliffe, wife of the "Yorkshire Ripper" Peter Sutcliffe, sued over allegations in January 1981 that she had used her connection to her husband to make money. Outside the court in May 1989, Hislop quipped about the then-record award of £600,000 in damages: "If that's justice then I'm a banana." The sum was reduced on appeal to £60,000. Readers raised a considerable sum in the "Bananaballs Fund", and Private Eye donated the surplus to the families of Peter Sutcliffe's victims. In Sonia Sutcliffe's 1990 libel case against the News of the World, it emerged that she had indeed benefited financially from her husband's crimes, although the details of Private Eye's article had been inaccurate.

In 1994, retired police inspector Gordon Anglesea successfully sued the Eye and three other media outlets for libel over allegations that he had indecently assaulted under-aged boys in Wrexham in the 1980s. In October 2016, he was convicted of historic sex offences. Hislop said the magazine would not attempt to recover the £80,000 damages awarded to Anglesea, stating: "I can't help thinking of the witnesses who came forward to assist our case at the time, one of whom later committed suicide telling his wife that he never got over not being believed. Private Eye will not be looking to get our money back from the libel damages. Others have paid a far higher price." Anglesea died in December 2016, six weeks into a 12-year prison sentence.

In 1999, former Hackney London Borough Council executive Samuel Yeboah won substantial damages and an apology after the Rotten Borough column "at least 13 times" described him as corrupt and claimed he used "the race card" to avoid criticism.

A victory for the magazine came in late 2001 when a libel case brought by Cornish chartered accountant John Stuart Condliffe was dropped after six weeks with an out-of-court settlement in which Condliffe paid £100,000 towards the Eye's defence. Writing in The Guardian, Jessica Hodgson noted, "The victory against Condliffe—who was represented by top media firm Peter Carter-Ruck and partners—is a big psychological victory for the magazine".

In 2009, Private Eye successfully challenged an injunction brought against it by Michael Napier, the former head of the Law Society, who had sought to claim "confidentiality" over a report that he had been disciplined by the Law Society for a conflict of interest. The ruling had wider significance in that it allowed other rulings by the Law Society to be publicised.

== Ownership ==
The magazine is owned by an eclectic group of people and is published by a limited company, Pressdram Ltd, which was bought as an "off the shelf" company by Peter Cook in November 1961.

Private Eye does not publish a list of its editors, writers, designers and staff. In 1981 the book The Private Eye Story stated that the owners were Cook, who owned most of the shares, with smaller shareholders including actors Dirk Bogarde and Jane Asher, and several of those involved with the founding of the magazine.

Shareholders as of the annual company return dated 26 March 2021

- Jane Asher
- Elizabeth Cook
- The executor of the estate of Lord Faringdon
- Ian Hislop (also a director)
- Private Eye (Productions) Ltd
- Anthony Rushton (also a director)
- The executor of the estate of Sarah Seymour
- The Private Eye Trust (majority shareholder)
- Peter Usborne (1937–2023)
- Brock van den Bogaerde (a nephew of Bogarde)
- Sheila Molnar
- Geoff Elwell (also the company secretary).

Within its pages, the magazine always refers to its owner as the mythical proprietor "Lord Gnome", a satirical dig at autocratic press barons.

== Logo ==
The magazine's masthead features a cartoon logo of an armoured knight, Gnitty, with a bent sword, parodying the "Crusader" logo of the Daily Express. Gnitty is occasionally redrawn to reflect current events; for instance, during the COVID-19 pandemic, Gnitty was pictured wearing a mask.

The logo for the magazine's news page is a naked Mr Punch caressing his erect and oversized penis while riding a donkey and hugging a female admirer. It is a detail from a frieze by "Dickie" Doyle that once formed the masthead of Punch magazine, which the editors of Private Eye had come to loathe for its perceived descent into complacency. The image, hidden away in the detail of the frieze, had appeared on the cover of Punch for nearly a century and was noticed by Malcolm Muggeridge during a guest-editing spot on Private Eye. The "Rabelaisian gnome", as the character was called, was enlarged by Gerald Scarfe and put on the front cover of issue 69 in 1964 at full size. He was then formally adopted as a mascot on the inside pages, as a symbol of the old, radical incarnation of Punch magazine that the Eye admired.

The masthead text was designed by Matthew Carter, who later designed the web fonts Verdana and Georgia, and the Windows 95 interface font Tahoma. He wrote, "Nick Luard [then co-owner] wanted to change Private Eye into a glossy magazine and asked me to design it. I realised that this was a hopeless idea once I had met Christopher Booker, Richard Ingrams and Willie Rushton."

== See also ==
- The Spectator
- The Onion
- Humour magazine
- List of satirical magazines
- List of satirical news websites
