= Philip Jackson (actor) =

English actor (born 1948)

- Born: 18 June 1948 (age 78); Retford, Nottinghamshire, England
- Occupation: Actor
- Years active: 1969–present
- Spouse: Sally Baxter
- Children: 2

Philip Jackson (born 18 June 1948) is an English actor. He appeared as Chief Inspector Japp in both the television series Agatha Christie's Poirot and in BBC Radio dramatisations of Poirot stories; as Melvin "Dylan" Bottomley in Porridge; and as Abbot Hugo, one of the recurring adversaries in the 1980s series Robin of Sherwood.

== Life and career ==
Jackson was born in Retford, Nottinghamshire. He was educated at Retford King Edward VI Grammar School, where his best friend was the poet Max Blagg, and started acting while studying Drama and German at the University of Bristol. He has since worked in the theatre in Leeds, Liverpool and London. His stage work includes Pozzo in Samuel Beckett's Waiting for Godot at the Queen's Theatre in the West End in 1991 and Willy Loman in Arthur Miller's Death of a Salesman at the West Yorkshire Playhouse, Leeds in 2010. He was nominated for a Screen Actors Guild Award for his role in Little Voice (1998).

His television appearances have included Coronation Street, Robin of Sherwood, A Touch of Frost, Foyle's War, Midsomer Murders, Heartbeat, Little Britain, Hamish Macbeth, Raised by Wolves and Last of the Summer Wine. He has also appeared in the films Scum, Paul McCartney's Give My Regards to Broad Street, Brassed Off, Mike Bassett: England Manager, "Grow Your Own", and My Week with Marilyn. He also appeared in the music video of A-Ha's "Take On Me".

In 2000 he appeared as Dyer/Hawksmoor in Nick Fisher's adaptation for BBC Radio 4 of Peter Ackroyd's Hawksmoor (novel), and in 2001 he starred in the BBC Radio 4 adaptation of the Petrella mysteries by Michael Gilbert, and guest-starred in the Doctor Who audio play Valhalla. In 2009 he starred as Gaynor's father Roy in the BBC Two sitcom Home Time. In a BBC Radio 4 radio adaptation of Terry Pratchett's Night Watch, he played Commander Vimes and in Pratchett's Mort, he played Death's butler/cook, Albert who is eventually revealed to be Alberto Malich. He also voiced Risda Tarkaan on the BBC radio drama version of C. S. Lewis' The Last Battle. In 2011, he read Gulliver's Travels as an audiobook, as well as Martin Cruz Smith's Three Stations for BBC Radio 4’s Book at Bedtime. In 2011, Jackson starred as Ron in the three-part BBC comedy drama series Sugartown alongside Sue Johnston and Tom Ellis.

In 2012, he appeared in the Academy Award-nominated My Week with Marilyn as Marilyn's security guard.

From 2014 to 2016 he co-starred in the BBC sitcom Boomers.

He plays Jaz Milvane in the Radio 4 series Ed Reardon's Week, written by Christopher Douglas and Andrew Nickolds.

== Personal life ==
Jackson is married to actress Sally Baxter. The couple have two children.

== Filmography ==
- Rogue Male (1976, TV film) as 1st Seaman
- Scum (1979) as Greaves
- Give My Regards to Broad Street (1984) as Alan
- The Doctor and the Devils (1985) as Andrew Merry-Lees
- Slip-Up (1986, TV film) as Purgavie
- The Fourth Protocol (1987) as Burkinshaw
- High Hopes (1988) as Martin
- Brassed Off (1996) as Jim
- The Opium War (1997) as Captain White
- Little Voice (1998) as George
- Cousin Bette (1998) as De Wissembourg
- Mike Bassett: England Manager (2001) as Lonnie Urquart
- A Little Trip to Heaven (2005) as William
- I Want Candy (2007) as Stephen, Joe's Dad
- Margaret (2009, TV film) as Bernard Ingham
- My Week with Marilyn (2011) as Roger Smith
- Spike Island (2012) as Mr Jackson
- The Best Offer (2013) as Fred
- Believe (2013) as Bob
- Peterloo (2018) as John Knight

== Television ==
- Porridge (1974, 1 episode) as Melvin "Dylan" Bottomley
- Last of the Summer Wine (1976, 3 episodes) as Gordon Simmonite
- The Brothers (1976, 1 episode) as Garage Mechanic
- Pennies from Heaven (1978) as Dave
- Leave it to Charlie (1978: "Home and Away") as Geoffrey
- Sounding Brass (1980) as Arthur Mannion
- Coronation Street (1982) as Smithy
- Robin of Sherwood (1984–86) as Abbot Hugo de Rainault
- The Play on One: The Dark Room (1988) as Greg
- Hamish Macbeth (1996: "A Perfectly Simple Explanation") as Malachi McBean
- Touching Evil (1997) as Jim Keller
- Bramwell (1 episode, 1997) as Ronald
- The Last Salute (12 episodes, 1998–1999) as Leonard Spanwick
- Murder Most Horrid (2 episodes, 1994–99)
- The Sins (2000), as Mickey
- Victoria Wood with All the Trimmings (2000) as Willis
- Silent Witness, (2001: "Faith") as Detective Inspector Mike Toner
- Crime and Punishment (2002) as Marmaladov
- Cruise of the Gods (2002) as Hugh Bispham
- Agatha Christie's Poirot (1989–2002, 2013) as Chief Inspector James Japp
- Little Britain (1 episode, 2003) as Breakfast Cereal Director
- Trust (2003 one episode only)
- Heartbeat (2 episodes, 1998–2004) as Brian Simpson
- Hustle (1 episode, 2004: "The Last Gamble") as Arthur Bond
- Murder in Suburbia (2004 one episode only) as Bill Jackson
- A Touch of Frost (2 episodes, 1999–2005) as Detective Sergeant Sharpe
- Funland (2005) as Leo Finch
- Foyle's War (2006: "Invasion") as Alan Carter
- New Tricks (2006) as suspect Andrew Bartlett
- The Chase (2007)
- Place of Execution (2008)
- The Long Walk to Finchley (2008) as Alderman Roberts
- Crooked House (2008)
- Midsomer Murders (1 episode, 2009: "The Glitch") as Daniel Snape
- Home Time (2009) as Roy Jacks
- Pete versus Life (2010–2011) as Frank
- Sugartown (2011) as Ron
- Cuckoo (2012) as Tony Edwards
- Shameless (2013) as Barry
- Boomers (2014–2016) as Alan
- DCI Banks (2014: "Bad Boy") as Al Jenkins
- Death in Paradise (2014) as David Witton
- Raised by Wolves (2013–2016) as Grampy
- The Good Karma Hospital (14 episodes, 2017-2018 and 2022) as Paul Smart
- Bad Move (2017) as Ken
- Shakespeare & Hathaway: Private Investigators (2020) as Chamberlin, episode 3.3 "The Sticking Place"
- Sherwood (2022–2024) as Mickey Sparrow
- The Day of the Jackal (2024) as Trevor (Guest actor), Season 1 Episode 10
- Daddy Issues (2025) as Jackie, Series 2
