= The Wipers Times (play) =

2016 play by Ian Hislop and Nick Newman

- Original language: English
- Written by: Ian Hislop; Nick Newman
- Subject: The Wipers Times

Premiere
- Date: 22 September 2016
- Place: Watermill Theatre, Newbury, Berkshire

The Wipers Times is a play by Ian Hislop and Nick Newman, based on their 2013 BBC dramatization of the creation of The Wipers Times newspaper during World War I.

== Productions ==
The play premiered at the Watermill Theatre, Newbury from 22 September to 29 October 2016.

Following its run at the Watermill, the play toured to the Lyceum Theatre, Sheffield, New Wolsey Theatre, Ipswich and Salisbury Playhouse during November 2016.

The play transferred to the Arts Theatre in London's West End from 21 March to 13 May 2017. From September to November 2017 began another tour at the New Theatre, Cardiff, Oxford Playhouse, Palace Theatre, Westcliff-on-Sea, Yvonne Arnaud Theatre, Guildford, Manchester Opera House, Theatre Royal, Glasgow and Everyman Theatre, Cheltenham.

From August to October 2018, the play embarked an 11-week UK tour beginning at Nottingham Theatre Royal before touring to Oxford Playhouse, Northcott Theatre, Exeter, Festival Theatre, Malvern, Curve, Leicester, Devonshire Park Theatre, Eastbourne and Birmingham Repertory Theatre. Following the tour, the play returned to the Arts Theatre in London's West End running from 16 October to 1 December 2018.

== Studying the play ==
The play has been widely used as a text to be studied in the UK. Brown and Massey have reflected on the use of the play together with The Wipers Times itself to teach students about both the reality and complexity of soldier's experiences but also to help develop an understanding of the processes by which historical accounts are built.
