= Nick Newman (cartoonist) =

British cartoonist

- Born: 17 July 1958 (age 68); Kuala Lumpur, Malaysia
- Education: Ardingly College
- Alma mater: Oriel College, Oxford
- Occupations: Cartoonist, scriptwriter
- Known for: A Bunch of Amateurs; My Dad's the Prime Minister; The Wipers Times

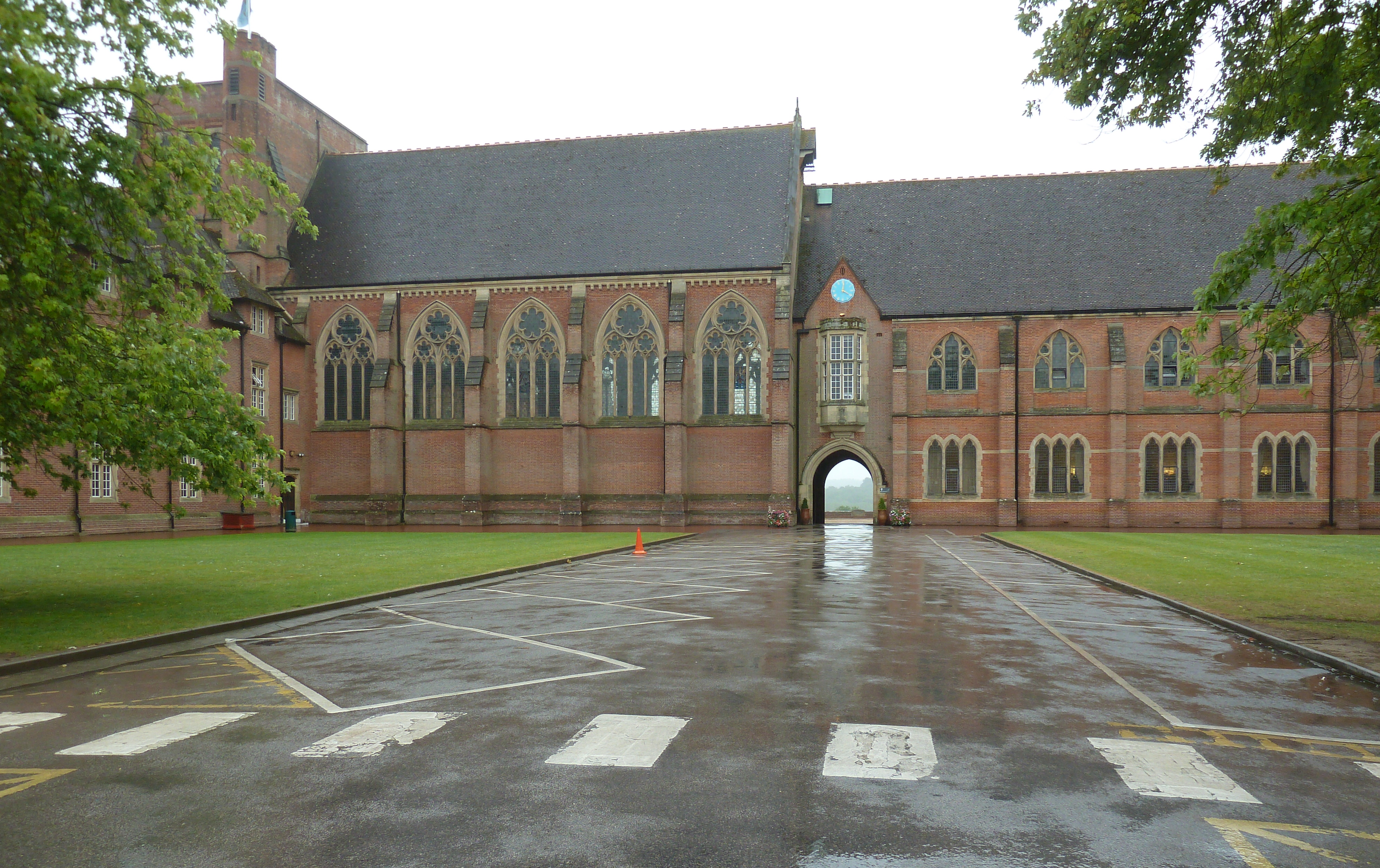
Ardingly College

Nick Newman (born 17 July 1958) is a satirical British cartoonist and comedy scriptwriter.

== Early life ==
The son of an RAF officer, Newman was born in Kuala Lumpur and schooled at Ardingly College where his satirical career began, working on revues with Ian Hislop. In his last term at Ardingly, Newman was "asked to leave" (thrown out), after wiring up the chapel to play rock music ("Happy in the Lord" by Stackridge) during a chapel service. Despite this incident Newman managed to secure a place at Oriel College, Oxford where he read history and continued collaborating with Hislop, who was studying English at Magdalen College.

== Career ==
Hislop and Newman subsequently wrote for Maureen Lipman and co-wrote several episodes of Murder Most Horrid for Dawn French. Newman and Hislop's credits also include two series of My Dad's the Prime Minister for BBC One, sketches for Harry Enfield & Chums, creating the character Tim Nice-But-Dim, and the BBC Radio 4 series Gush, a satire based on the first Gulf War, in the style of Jeffrey Archer. Writing for radio, he has co-written all episodes of Dave Podmore's World of Cricket, Dave Podmore's Ashes and Strictly Dave Podmore with performer Chris Douglas and Andrew Nickolds and The News at Bedtime with long-time friend and schoolmate Ian Hislop. Also with Chris Douglas, he wrote two series of Mastering the Universe for Dawn French on Radio 4. In 2008 he co-wrote A Bunch of Amateurs – starring Burt Reynolds, Sir Derek Jacobi and Samantha Bond – which was the Royal Film Performance for that year.

Newman's career as a cartoonist began in 1976, when he sold his first drawings to Yachting Monthly – and by 1981 he was working regularly for Private Eye. Since 1989, he has been pocket cartoonist for The Sunday Times. His cartoons and strips have appeared in many other publications including Punch and The Spectator. He also draws for Times Higher Education (THE), Estates Gazette, The Wisden Cricketer, the Wisden Almanack and The Big Issue. The Cartoon Art Trust voted him Pocket Cartoonist of the Year 1997 and Gag Cartoonist of the Year 1998 and 2005. He won the Sports Journalists' Association's award for Sports Cartoonist of the Year in 2005, 2007 and 2008.

He has produced many cartoon anthologies and books, including three Wallace & Gromit adventures (with Tristan Davies, published by Hodder & Stoughton).
