= A Bunch of Amateurs =

2008 film by Andy Cadiff

- Theatrical release poster
- Directed by: Andy Cadiff
- Written by: Nick Newman; John Ross; Ian Hislop; Jonathan Gershfield
- Produced by: David Parfitt
- Starring: Burt Reynolds; Imelda Staunton; Derek Jacobi; Samantha Bond
- Cinematography: Ashley Rowe
- Edited by: Mark Thornton
- Music by: Christian Henson
- Release date: 19 December 2008
- Running time: 96 minutes
- Country: United Kingdom
- Language: English

A Bunch of Amateurs is a 2008 British comedy film directed by Andy Cadiff, and stars Burt Reynolds, Derek Jacobi, Alistair Petrie and Samantha Bond. In November 2008, the premiere in Leicester Square was attended by Elizabeth II. The screenplay was written by Nick Newman, John Ross, Ian Hislop and Jonathan Gershfield.

== Plot ==
A washed-up Hollywood star is flown to England to play the title role in King Lear at "Stratford" believing he will be appearing onstage at the legendary RST in Stratford-upon-Avon, the birthplace of William Shakespeare. Instead he finds he has signed on with the "Stratford Players" in the Suffolk village of Stratford St John. He goes to the United Kingdom with his career deteriorating and having problems with his daughter who is an aspiring actress on the fringes of the New York theatre. The local villagers are somewhat of a motley crew and are naturally delighted to have such an - albeit unsuccessful - star playing with them. Reynolds plays a typically selfish American with no time for manners, and displays an appalling lack of class, considering himself too big for this lowly setting. The transition to humble actor, happy to play with the British actors takes some time, but eventually he is reconciled with his estranged daughter and realises that he is no better, in terms of talent and intelligence, than his amateur colleagues.

== Cast ==
- Burt Reynolds as Jefferson Steele
- Samantha Bond as Dorothy Nettle
- Imelda Staunton as Mary
- Derek Jacobi as Nigel Dewberry
- Camilla Arfwedson as Amanda Blacke
- Charles Durning as Charlie Rosenberg
- Lorraine Ashbourne as Janine Jarvis
- Gemma Lawrence as Verity Nettle
- Peter Gunn as Frank Dobbins
- Tony Jayawardena as Kevin Patel
- Alistair Petrie as Rupert Twisk
- Peter Wight as Mike Bell
- Kelly Price as Lauren Bell
- Surendra Kochar as Kevin's Mum
- Kirsty More as School Girl

== Release ==
The film had its UK premiere at the Royal Film Performance, an event held in aid of the Film & TV Charity, on 17 November 2008, at the ODEON Leicester Square. The event was attended by Elizabeth II and the Duke of Edinburgh. The film chosen for the event was originally supposed to be Harry Potter and the Half-Blood Prince, but it was changed when the release date was pushed back.

== Reception ==
The film was poorly received by critics, with criticism mostly focusing on the film's stale humour and Burt Reynolds's performance.
