= Dave Podmore =

Fictional English cricketer

Dave Podmore is a fictional English cricketer. Co-written by the English actor and writer Christopher Douglas, Andrew Nickolds and Nick Newman, his column appears in The Guardian.

== Fictional character ==
Podmore began his career with Leicestershire, and he is married to Jackie Podmore, a lap-dancer. He owns a psychotic dog called Saxon. He views cricket as a means to making easy money through match-fixing, benefit nights, appearances at supermarket openings and the aborted attempt to open the Dave Podmore Academy of Cricket Excellence.

Before the 2006/7 Ashes series he was appointed sledging coach to the Australian cricket team.

His Test batting average is 4.

"An edge through the slips against Sri Lanka, they cannot take that away from me ...except in Wisden which says it was leg byes".

== Radio series ==
Dave Podmore (played by Douglas) also became a comic radio series broadcast on BBC Radio 4, and often repeated on BBC Radio 4 Extra. Between 2001 and 2007 there were three series of Dave Podmore's Cricket Night. An Ashes special, Dave Podmore's Ashes Quest, was broadcast at the end of 2006 and the beginning of 2007. "A History of the Ashes in 100 objects" (inspired by the acclaimed BBC Radio 4 series A History of the World in 100 Objects) was broadcast to coincide with the Ashes series in December 2010. To celebrate the start of the 2013 Ashes series, "Dave Podmore's Ashes Shame" was broadcast on 7 June 2013.

Reviewing the past week's radio for The Daily Telegraph in July 2015, Gillian Reynolds wrote, "Dave Podmore’s Toughest Test (Radio 4, Sunday) brought back the great Pod, fictional archetype of the semi-celebrity sportsman presenter, hilarious yet appalling creation of Christopher Douglas, Andrew Nickolds and Nick Newman", praising the episode's, "Sublime parodies (of The One Show, the 1950s Home Service, Pathé news, languid chaps at the Garrick, James Corden’s raucous Sky TV sports quiz A League of Their Own, a comradely Hugh Grant and a snappy BBC Radio 5 Live headline)". In December 2016, Radio Times chose Dave Podmore Cleans Up for Christmas amongst its selection of the "best radio for Christmas 2016".

Two books have also been produced, titled Pod Almighty and Word of Pod.
