= Sugartown (TV series) =

Television series

- Genre: Comedy drama
- Created by: Jodi Reynolds; Sally Dexter
- Written by: Jodi Reynolds; Sally Dexter
- Directed by: Christine Gernon
- Starring: Shaun Dooley; Tom Ellis; Sue Johnston; Miranda Raison; Phillip Jackson; Georgia King; Rob Kendrick; Paul J Medford; Juliet Cowan; Sally Dexter
- Country of origin: United Kingdom
- Original language: English
- No. of series: 1
- No. of episodes: 3

Production
- Executive producers: Jodie Reynolds; Kate Croft; Simon Wilson
- Producer: Susie Liggat
- Running time: 60 minutes
- Production company: Shed Media Scotland

Original release
- Network: BBC One
- Release: 24 July – 7 August 2011

Sugartown is a three-part comedy drama series for the BBC filmed in and around the seaside towns of Filey in North Yorkshire, and Bridlington in the East Riding of Yorkshire, utilising the John Bull rock factory. It is set in a fictional seaside town called Sugartown, credited as the home of rock and still the site of the struggling Burr's rock factory.

== Plot ==
Jason Burr (Shaun Dooley) owns the Burr's rock factory and it trying to keep it afloat. His brother, Max Burr (Tom Ellis), has plans to redevelop Sugartown as a modern leisure resort. These plans do not include the factory. Opposing these plans, local residents Carmen (Georgia King) and Travis (Rob Kendrick) hit upon Sugartown's history of dance as a possible way to restore the town's fortunes.

Tensions between the brothers are not helped by the fact that both are in love with Emily (Miranda Raison) and the drama begins on the evening of Jason's proposal to her.

== Broadcast and reception ==
Broadcast during the 22:35 slot on BBC1, the first episode rated below average with 2.00 million viewers (13.72% audience share) in the provisional BARB overnight ratings. It was beaten in the ratings by The Lovely Bones on Channel 4 and fell below the slot average of 2.39m (15.4% audience share) for BBC1 for the year to date. The second episode broadcast was watched by 1.5 million instead. Once again, this failed to reach the slot average of 2.39 million, but unlike the first episode, missed the average by just under one million viewers.

The opening episode received poor reviews from The Guardian's Sam Wollaston who branded it "lame, tired, predictable and uninteresting"; Christopher Hooton, of the Metro, who described it as a "3-part disaster-piece" and "pretty much beyond repair"; and Paddy Shennan, in the Liverpool Echo, who described the actors as "playing cardboard cutouts acting out a painful, pitiful pathetic and patronising plot". Writing in The Stage, Harry Venning praised the first ten minutes before adding that the goodwill they generated "was squandered in the truly dreadful 50 minutes that followed". Tom Sutcliffe, in The Independent described it as a mis-scheduled children's programme, writing, "it's hard to see Sugartown as anything else, so guileless is its plotting and so jauntily empty of threat are its characterisations." Sutcliffe conceded that it was not a bad show of its type but doubted it would appeal to many, summarizing it as "cocoa for the mind". Writing in The Herald, Alan Morrison judged that "cliche is the stuff that Sugartown is made of" but that its feel good simplicity was of a piece with Sunday night TV and that "Sugartown is ready to wrap itself around viewers for the next two weeks like a snuggly blanket on the living-room sofa". In conclusion he stated that Sugartown "won’t (and needn’t) do a whole lot more than satisfy the sweet tooth of a Sunday-night audience." In The Scotsman, Paul Whitelaw, was scathing about the general type of cosy northern comedy dramas and Sugatown in particular. He compared it unfavourably with Victoria Wood and Ealing Comedy and finished by saying, "Pastel-coloured in sugary shades of CBBC, it should be studiously avoided if you're lactose intolerant or simply intolerant of vacuous entertainment."

Jane Murphy, for Orange, disagreed with the late airing time, saying that "surely this is the kind of please-everyone programme that would fit neatly into the just-past-Sunday-teatime slot." For CultBox, David Lewis gave a three star review, saying that the balance between comedy and drama "doesn't quite work" and "while the dialogue sparkles, the action does not." In the Radio Times, Alison Graham was extremely negative, stating "After ten minutes of this gormless show you’ll feel as if you’re caught up in a dreadful theme-park ride that hurls you through dank tunnels of cliché." She later summarized her feelings on her Radio Times blog with the simple statement, "It made me want to die."

The Daily Telegraph listed all three episodes in their "TV Highlights" section for the day. However, they did not give it wholehearted support, describing episode one as a type of comedy that "has seen better days" but was "not without charm". Episode two received the comment "Admittedly it isn't often very funny, but it's warm and entertaining enough." Finally, episode three gained this assessment, "It's not groundbreaking, but Sue Johnston is as reliable as ever, and at least it doesn't have a laughter track."

== Episodes ==
Sugartown was released on region 2 DVD on 5 September 2011.

No.	Title	Directed by	Written by	Original release date	UK viewers (audience share)
1	"Episode One"	Christine Gernon	Jodi Reynolds and Sally Dexter	24 July 2011	2.0 million (13.7%)
Jason's surprise engagement party for Emily is derailed by the return of his brother, Max, who wants to redevelop the town – starting with a controversial new nightspot. But when the locals discover Sugartown once had a proud tradition of dance, they realise they may just have found a way to save their community with the town troublemaker Travis.
2	"Episode Two"	Christine Gernon	Jodi Reynolds and Sally Dexter	31 July 2011	1.5 million (10.5%)
Jason re-launches the Rock Factory in an effort to save it from Max's hostile takeover. But Max is after more than Jason's business; he is also gunning for Jason's fiancée, Emily. Meanwhile, Sam and Carmen open Sugartown's Dance Academy. But the town learn more than salsa, as an old secret is revealed that may change the town's fortunes forever.
3	"Episode Three"	Christine Gernon	Jodi Reynolds and Sally Dexter	7 August 2011	1.45 million (10.4%)
The Sugartown wedding of the year is back on, which is good news for the whole community who haven't had much to celebrate of late. Is Emily's heart in the right place? Meanwhile, Margery and the gang are harbouring a shocking secret about Max and the entire Burr family legacy.
