= My Dad's the Prime Minister =

- Genre: Comedy
- Created by: Ian Hislop; Nick Newman
- Written by: Ian Hislop and Nick Newman
- Directed by: Juliet May
- Starring: Robert Bathurst; Carla Mendonça; Jasper Britton; Joe Prospero; Emma Sackville
- Theme music composer: Steve Brown
- Composer: Steve Brown
- Country of origin: United Kingdom
- Original language: English
- No. of series: 2
- No. of episodes: 13

Production
- Executive producers: Sophie Clarke-Jervoise; Ian Gordon; Elaine Sperber
- Producer: Matthew Francis
- Cinematography: Chris Goodger
- Editor: Jake Bernard
- Running time: 30 minutes
- Production companies: CBBC; BBC Entertainment

Original release
- Network: BBC One; CBBC Channel
- Release: 23 March 2003 – 31 December 2004

My Dad's the Prime Minister is a 2003–2004 British sitcom written by Ian Hislop and Nick Newman, and was a co-production between CBBC and BBC Entertainment. It centres on the life of the Prime Minister, his family and his spin doctor. Its main cast include Robert Bathurst, Joe Prospero, Carla Mendonça, Brian Bovell and Emma Sackville.

It was filmed at Bushey in Watford, and extras included students of the nearby Bushey Hall School and Bushey Meads School.

Series 1 was shown on BBC One as part of its CBBC strand, in April and May 2003. Season 2 was promoted to a primetime slot on BBC One, airing in November and December 2004. Series 1 focused more on Dillon (the Prime Minister's son), while the second season had greater coverage of the life of the Prime Minister.

== Synopsis ==
Dillon Phillips is twelve years old, and also burdened with a father who is the Prime Minister and has just been voted "Naffest Man in Britain" by his favourite pop magazine. His dad's smarmy and unlikeable spin doctor, Duncan Packer, interferes with everything and the slightest bit of bad behaviour may trigger an international crisis. Dillon's mother, Clare, is a successful businesswoman and has little time for him, while his older sister, Sarah, is annoyingly bossy and dismissive of her brother and his problems: however, the pair do occasionally join forces in order to fight against their oppressive regime, and especially against Packer. At school, Dillon's only real friend is a boy known as 'Geezer', the other boys (a boy known as 'Flash', his main nemesis, in particular) frequently picking on him because of his father's position, especially when the latter shows him up, for example by arriving at the school's sports day in a helicopter. Dillon achieves some solace through imagining himself as a feisty, Jeremy Paxman-style, newsreader and interviewer, constantly interrogating his parents and sister and the odious Packer on matters that impinge on him. Most episodes open and close with these 'fantasy' newsflashes. He also occasionally gets some support from his kindly paternal grandmother, who takes surprisingly little interest in Michael's political career, preferring instead to focus on the achievements of her other son and her grandchildren.

== Cast ==
- Robert Bathurst as Michael Phillips
- Joe Prospero as Dillon Phillips
- Carla Mendonça as Clare Phillips
- Emma Sackville as Sarah Phillips
- Jasper Britton as Duncan Packer
- Brian Bovell as Detective Andy Sharp (Series 1)
- Paterson Joseph as Detective Gary McRyan (Series 2)
- Simeon Gunn as JJ
- Joe Gunn as Geezer
- Liam Hess as Dom Clackson
- Luke Newberry as Lighthouse
- Leagh Conwell as James "Flash" Gordon
- Eugene Simon as Harry
- Marcia Warren as Granny Phillips
- Robert Vansittart as Chancellor
- Michael Cronin as Mr Speaker
- Michael Fenton Stevens as Home Secretary
- Neil McCaul as Foreign Secretary
- Jane Bertish as Education Secretary
- Martin Chamberlain as Trade and Industry Secretary
- Steve Toussaint as Transport Secretary
- Amanda Holt as Health Secretary
- Albert Welling as Opposition Leader
- Kenny Ireland as Union Leader

== Episodes ==
=== Series overview ===
Series	Episodes	Originally released	
Series	Episodes	First released	Last released
1	6	23 March 2003	27 April 2003
2	7	5 November 2004	31 December 2004

=== Series 1 (2003) ===
No.	Title	Directed by	Written by	Original release date
1	"Sports Day"	Juliet May	Ian Hislop and Nick Newman	23 March 2003
The Prime Minister's son Dillon anticipates sports day humiliation.
2	"The Party"	Juliet May	Ian Hislop & Nick Newman	30 March 2003
In an attempt to restore his credibility, the Prime Minister organises a celebrity party at Downing Street.
3	"Ghosts"	Juliet May	Ian Hislop & Nick Newman	6 April 2003
During a weekend at Chequers, Dillon has to show that he is not afraid of ghosts, while the Prime minister Must prove that he's not scared of his Belgian counterpart.
4	"The School Play"	Juliet May	Ian Hislop & Nick Newman	13 April 2003
As rehearsals for the school's stage production begin, Dillon is hiding something and Granny's arrival does not help. Will things be all right on the night?
5	"The Project"	Juliet May	Ian Hislop & Nick Newman	20 April 2003
Dillon is working hard on his project.
6	"Homework"	Juliet May	Ian Hislop & Nick Newman	27 April 2003
Can Dillon and his new friend foil the PM's plans to introduce an extra hour's homework a day - just for boys?

=== Series 2 (2004) ===
No. overall	No. in series	Title	Directed by	Written by	Original release date
7	1	"Election"	Juliet May	Ian Hislop & Nick Newman	5 November 2004
Father and son clash at the general election polls.
8	2	"Exam"	Juliet May	Ian Hislop & Nick Newman	12 November 2004
Is the PM's arithmetic up to a GCSE maths test? Can Dillon avoid a date with Amanda Gruntly?
9	3	"Desert Island"	Juliet May	Ian Hislop & Nick Newman	26 November 2004
The offer of a holiday puts Michael in a tight spot.
10	4	"Marathon"	Juliet May	Ian Hislop & Nick Newman	3 December 2004
The PM tries to prove his fitness when rumours of ill health dog Downing Street.
11	5	"Jobless"	Juliet May	Ian Hislop & Nick Newman	10 December 2004
A temporarily suspended Clare spends more time with her family, but they are keen as she returns to work.
12	6	"Diaries"	Juliet May	Ian Hislop & Nick Newman	17 December 2004
The PM confronts the serious business of having his portrait painted.
13	7	"Powerless"	Juliet May	Ian Hislop & Nick Newman	31 December 2004
The last-ever episode of the children's political comedy-drama.

== Home release ==
Series 1 was released on DVD and video in 2004 by DD Video, under license from the BBC.
