= The Wipers Times =

Satirical British trench magazine from the First World War

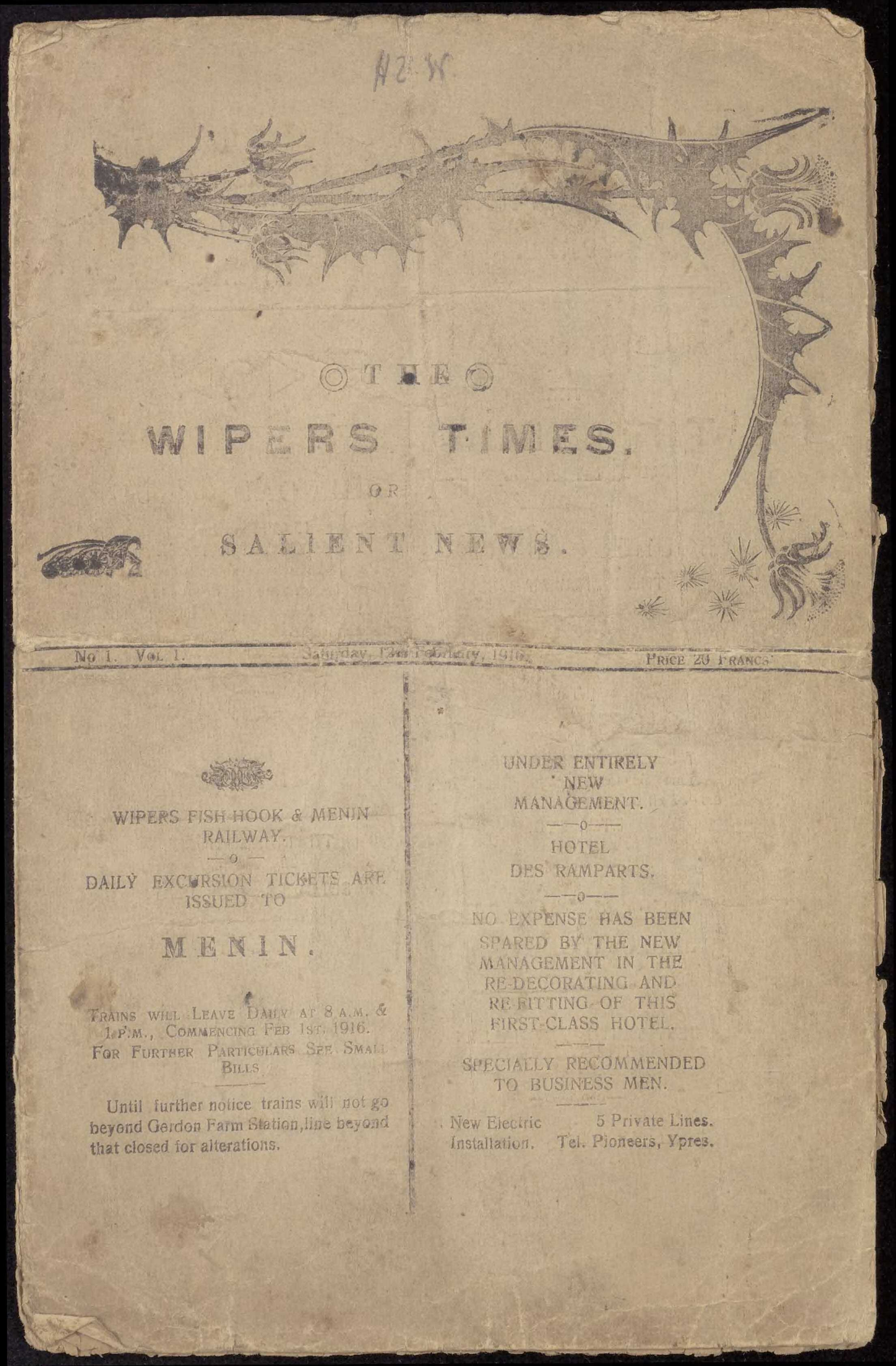
- The Wipers Times, first issue (12 February 1916)
- Editor: Capt. F. J. Roberts
- Sub-editor: Lt. J. H. Pearson
- Frequency: Intermittent
- Format: ca. 27.8 cm x 18 cm
- First issue: February 1916
- Final issue: December 1918
- Country: Belgium and France
- Language: English

The Wipers Times was a trench magazine that was published by British soldiers fighting in the Ypres Salient during the First World War.

In early 1916, the 12th Battalion, Sherwood Foresters stationed in the front line at Ypres, Belgium, came across an abandoned printing press. A sergeant who had been a printer in peacetime salvaged it and printed a sample page. The paper itself was named after Tommy slang pronunciation of Ypres.

== Publication history ==
Under its initial title The Wipers Times or Salient News, the first issue was published on 12 February 1916, with a circulation of one hundred copies. It was followed by another 22 issues, mostly consisting of 12 pages each.

While the size and the layout of the magazine remained consistent, its main title changed many times. Previous titles remained listed in the subtitle in chronological order, for instance: The B.E.F. Times: with which are incorporated The Wipers Times, The "New Church" Times, The Kemmel Times & The Somme-Times. Every main title change initiates a new volume and issue sequence and as result, there are several instances of 'volume 1, number 1'.

Publication was held up after February 1918 by the German offensive on the western front in that year, but at the end of the War, two issues were published as The Better Times. The second of these was billed as the Xmas, Peace and Final Number.

== Personnel ==
The names of the staff involved in the paper are mostly unrecorded. The editor was Captain (later Lieutenant-Colonel) Frederick John Roberts, MC, the sub-editor was Lieutenant (later Lieutenant-Colonel) John Hesketh ("Jack") Pearson, DSO, MC. A notable contributor to the paper was the Gunner Gilbert Frankau. Also worthy of note are the engravings by E. J. Couzens; his portrait of a chinless platoon commander clutching his cane and wondering "Am I as offensive as I might be?" became the paper's motif. Most other contributors from the Division used pseudonyms, some now obscure, some intended to satirise contemporary newspaper pundits such as William Beach Thomas (of the Daily Mail) and Hilaire Belloc and some ironic, such as P.B.I. (Poor Bloody Infantry).

== Contents ==
The paper consisted of poems, reflections, wry in-jokes and lampoons of the military situation the Division was in. In general the paper maintained a humorously ironic style that today can be recognised in satirical magazines such as The Duffel Blog, Private Eye, Le Canard enchaîné and The Onion.

=== Adverts ===
The covers of the issues were mostly mock adverts, richly typeset, often for war-related music-hall extravaganzas. Similar adverts appeared on the back and front inside covers:

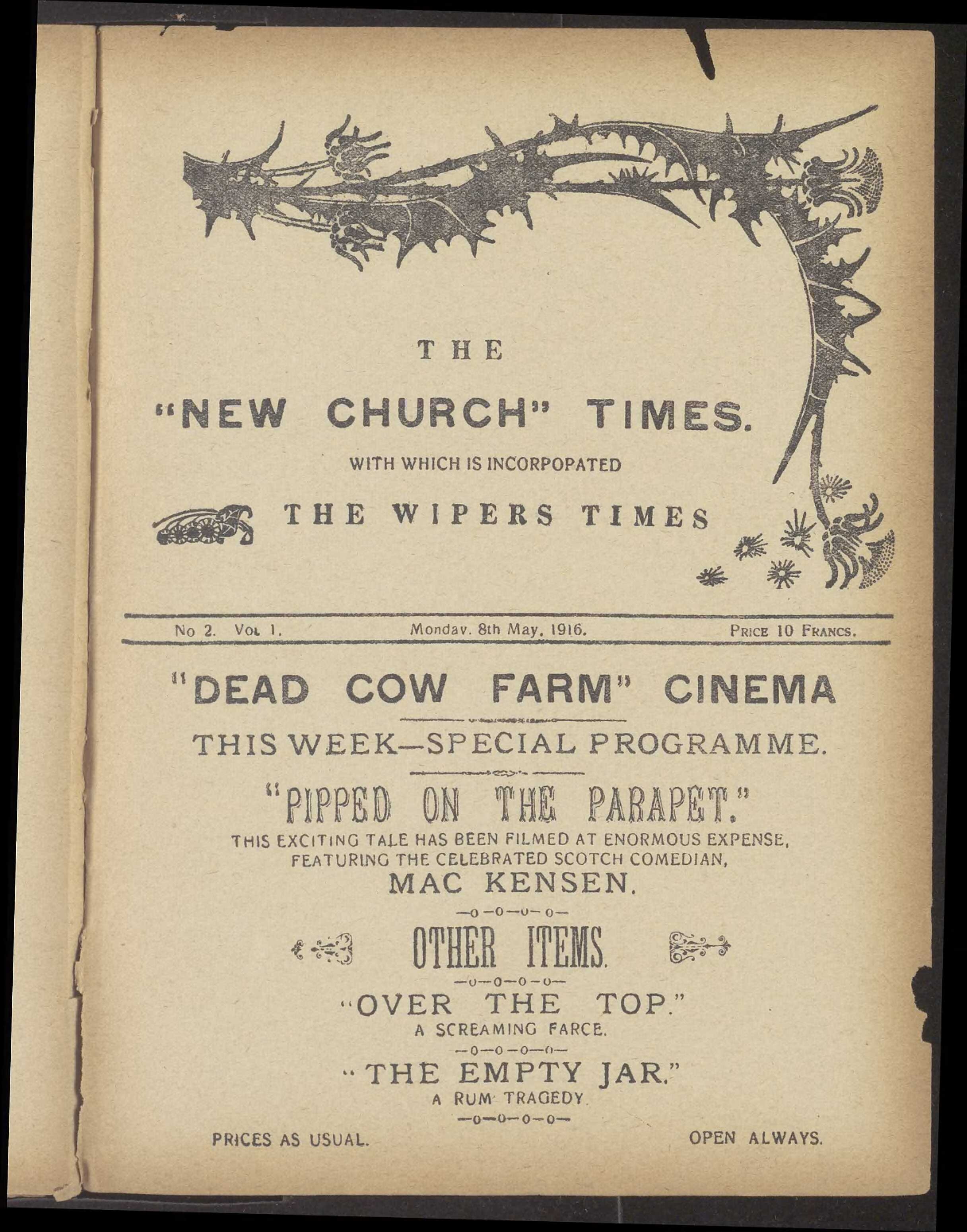

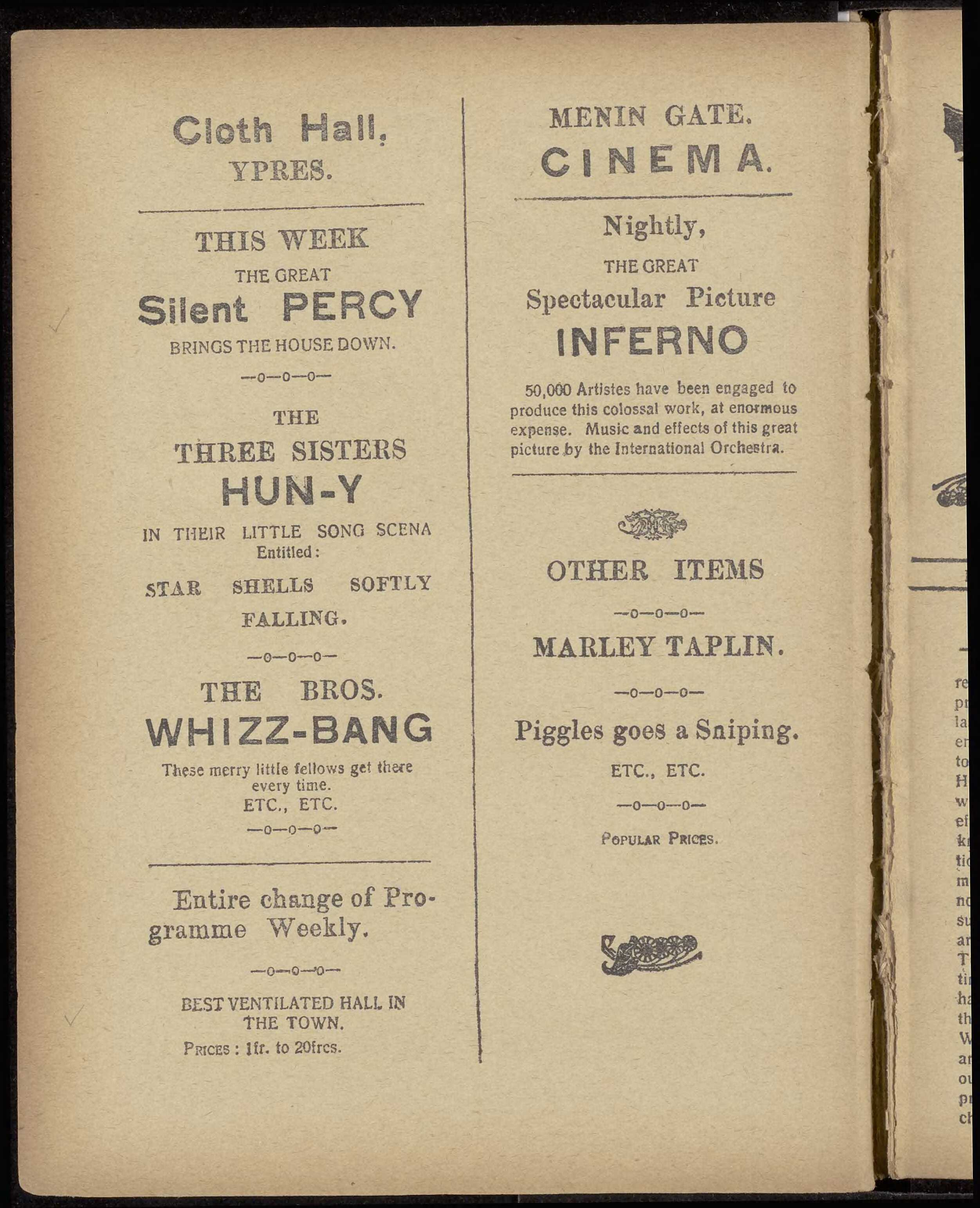

There were also offers for stays at unlikely locations like the city ramparts, and for weapons like the flammenwerfer (flamethrower) and even for the complete Ypres Salient front line:

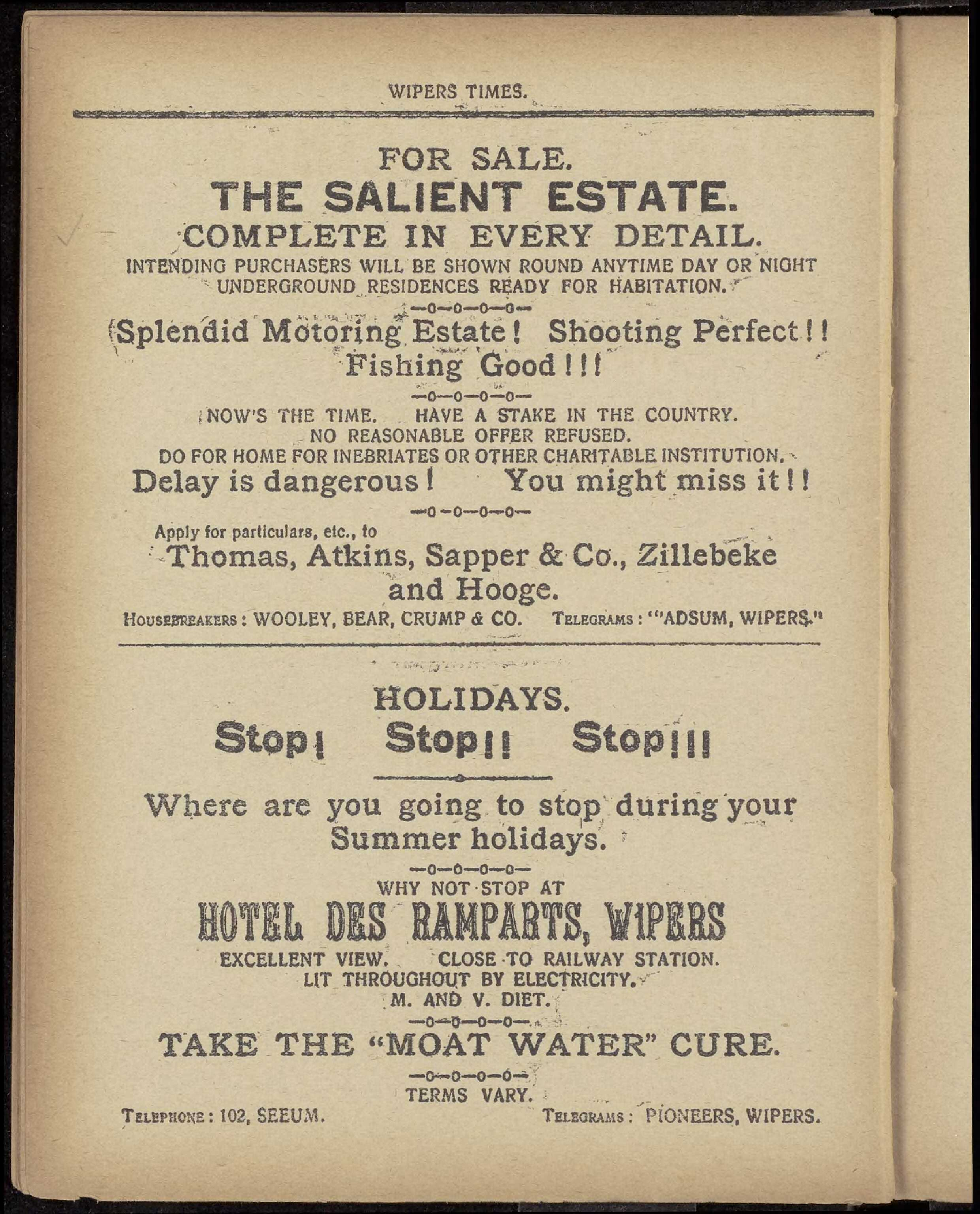

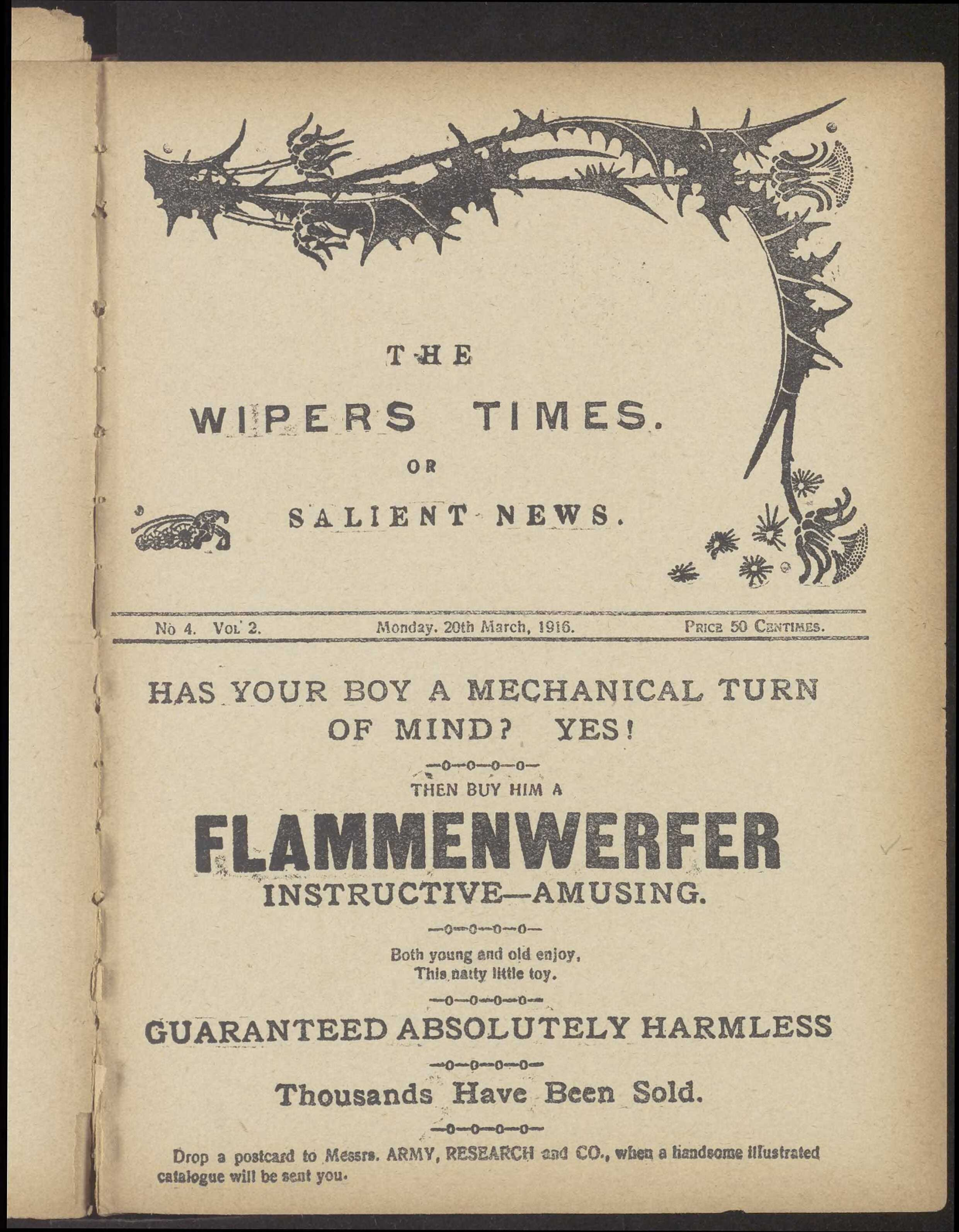

=== Vocabulary ===
The daily concerns of trench soldiers all make an appearance in the articles, sometimes explicit and sometimes as in-jokes for which outsiders would not have the key.

Shelling (whether from the enemy or one's own side): is referred to all through the magazine. There are occasional small ads purportedly from Minnie (German trench mortar) to Flying Pig (British ditto) and various poems complaining about, or apologising for, incidents where British guns shelled their own lines.

Sex: the collections of pornography known to the Division as "The Munque Art Gallery" and "Kirschner's" are frequently mentioned and occasionally advertised, as are the local brothels: the Fancies, the Poplar tree and Plug Street.

Drink: the continued supply of rum and whisky was a prime concern for all at the front. In one serial story, Narpoo Rum, a certain 'Herlock Shomes' spent five issues tracking rum-thieves round Hooge. Brief references also turn up to panic buying of supplies by unnamed individuals in the Division after rumours of a whisky drought.

Rats: these bred in enormous numbers in the trenches, chiefly fed on corpses but with an eye for anything left in a dugout. One poem in the paper describes how a rat and his wife opened a tin of sardines, ate the contents then sealed the tin back up for the author to find.

=== Articles ===
The reality of life in the trenches rarely breaks through what the editor termed the paper's 'hysterical hilarity' but when it does, the gallows humour is clear and may appear callous to modern eyes. One example is a quote from an article in a British national newspaper about a bungled trench-raid, followed by a sharp comment from the editor of the Wipers Times:

"...They climbed into the trench and surprised the sentry, but unfortunately the revolver which was held to his head missed fire. Attempts were made to throttle him quietly, but he succeeded in raising the alarm, and had to be killed." This we consider real bad luck for the sentry after the previous heroic efforts to keep him alive.

Another such, from the column "Verbatim Extracts from Intelligence Summaries" reads as follows:

"At 10 p.m. the "Flying Pig" dropped a round in our front line at X 9 D 5 2. The trench was completely wrecked—the crater formed being 14 feet deep and 25 feet across. It is consoling to think that over 40 rounds have been fired from this gun into the enemy trenches during the last week." (Very consoling to the P.B.I.)

Even the weather wasn't immune to it, if one wanted to lay odds on the forecasts:

5 to 1 Mist

11 to 2 East Wind or Frost

8 to 1 Chlorine.

=== Poetry ===
Much of the copy submitted by soldiers of the Division was poetry. Some was good, some was doggerel and occasional pieces were excellent: but not all was welcome. The fourth issue contained this notice from the editor:

We regret to announce that an insidious disease is affecting the Division, and the result is a hurricane of poetry. Subalterns have been seen with a notebook in one hand, and bombs in the other absently walking near the wire in deep communication with their muse. Even Quartermasters with "books, note, one" and "pencil, copying" break into song while arguing the point re "boots. gum, thigh". The Editor would be obliged if a few of the poets would break into prose as the paper cannot live by poems alone.

Nonetheless, much of the space in the paper was taken up by poems. Two typical examples are given below.

Realizing Men must laugh,
Some Wise Man devised the Staff :
Dressed them up in little dabs
Of rich variegated tabs :
Taught them how to win the War
On A.F.Z. 354 :
Let them lead the Simple Life
Far from all our vulgar strife :
Nightly gave them downy beds
For their weary, aching heads :
Lest their relatives might grieve
Often, often gave them leave,
Decorations too, galore :
What on earth could man wish more?
Yet, alas, or so says Rumour,
He forgot a sense of Humour!

The world wasn't made in a day,
And Eve didn't ride on a bus,
But most of the world's in a sandbag,
The rest of its plastered on us.

=== Miscellanea ===
The paper is sprinkled with small paragraphs and half-column articles such as "People We Take Our Hats Off To" (frequently the French), "Things We Want to Know", "Answers to Correspondents" and small ads. Some were obviously spoofs:

LONELY PRESIDENT wishes correspond with anyone.

Can write charming note. Has corresponded with most of the crowned heads of Europe.-

Write "Dignitas," Washington, U.S.A.

To Subaltern: Yes, every junior officer may carry a F.M.'s baton in his knapsack, but we think you'll discard that to make room for an extra pair of socks before very long.

TO LET-;Fine freehold estate in salubrious neighbourhood. Terms moderate. Owner going east shortly.-;Apply Bosch and Co., Messines.

While others were not for outsiders:

Things We Want To Know

The name of the celebrated infantry officer who appears daily in the trenches disguised as a Xmas tree.

How much money changed hands when it was known that he didn't get married on leave.

Whether a certain officer is shortly publishing a little song entitled "Why was I so careless with the boots."

To Troubled.-;Certainly think you have just complaint against people in the next dugout, and if you care to take the matter further there is no doubt you will get damages. It certainly was scandal if, as you affirm, the picture was one of Kirschner's.

We regret a further rise in property today.

== Acronyms and slang ==
- B.E.F. = British Expeditionary Force
- F.M. = Field Marshal
- Flying pig = British 9.45 inch Heavy Mortar
- Minnie = Minenwerfer - German trench mortar
- napoo/narpoo = there's none/there's no more (corrupted from il n'y a plus)
- P.B.I. = Poor Bloody Infantry
- AFZ = Army Form Zero - the Army has a numbered Form for every possible purpose - AFZ = loo paper

== Published editions ==
=== Original issues ===
There appear to be few surviving copies of original issues. This is not surprising considering the circumstances in which they were produced and distributed. The In Flanders Fields Museum in Ypres has an original copy of the first issue from 12 February 1916 in its collection. The British Library holds original copies of several issues (31 July 1916; 1 December 1916; 26 February 1918).

=== Facsimile editions ===
A book containing facsimiles of the first fifteen issues of the Wipers Times was published in early 1918. In 1930 the entire series was published in one volume. This was reprinted (with introduction and notes) in 1973 and again in 1988. A further edition was produced in 2006.

In 2026, a new facsimile edition project was announced by Talbot House, following the acquisition of Captain Frederick Roberts’ original print proofs of the Wipers Times. According to Talbot House, the project involves the reproduction of all twenty-three issues using Roberts’ annotated proofs, including censor stamps, editorial notes, and original spelling variations. The editions are scheduled for release on their corresponding publication dates, 110 years after their original appearance, and are accompanied by newly researched historical commentary.

- The Wipers Times: A facsimile reprint of the trench magazines: The Wipers Times-The New Church Times-The Kemmel Times-The Somme Times-The B.E.F. Times. Herbert Jenkins Ltd. 1918.
- The Wipers Times: Including for the first time in one volume a facsimile reproduction of the complete series of the famous wartime trench magazines. Eveleigh Nash & Grayson. 1930.
- The Wipers Times. P. Davies. 1973. ISBN 0-432-01292-3.
- The Wipers Times. Macmillan. 1988. ISBN 0-333-47653-0.
- The Wipers Times: The Complete Series of the Famous Wartime Trench Newspaper. Little Books. January 2006. ISBN 1-904435-60-2.
- Suffering from Cheerfulness: The best bits from The Wipers Times. Little Books. May 2007. ISBN 978-1-904435-66-2.
- The Wipers Times: The Famous First World War Trench Newspaper. Conway. September 2013. ISBN 9781844862337.

== Television ==
In 2013 the BBC broadcast a dramatisation, written by Ian Hislop and Nick Newman. Captain Fred Roberts was played by Ben Chaplin and Lt Jack Pearson by Julian Rhind-Tutt, with Michael Palin, Ben Daniels and Emilia Fox in supporting roles.

== Theatre ==
In September 2016, a stage adaptation of The Wipers Times opened at The Watermill Theatre in Newbury, adapted by Ian Hislop and Nick Newman from television script. In 2017, the production was scheduled to transfer to London's West End for a season at The Arts Theatre (March–May 2017). Over Remembrance Day weekend, the show was running at the Theatre Royal in Glasgow. In February 2018, a UK tour was announced for August–December 2018.
