= Ed Reardon's Week =

British radio series

Ed Reardon's Week is a sitcom on BBC Radio 4 recorded semi-naturalistically in the style of a radio drama. It concerns the story of a curmudgeonly middle-aged writer described in the show's publicity material as an "author, pipesmoker, consummate fare-dodger and master of the abusive email". The names of two central characters, Ed Reardon (played by Christopher Douglas) and Jaz Milvane (played by Philip Jackson), are references to the characters Edwin Reardon and Jasper Milvain, who appear in George Gissing's 1891 novel New Grub Street, which is set in the hack-literary London of the late 19th century, although Edward was revealed to be Ed's given name in the second episode of the third series and Milvain is referred to as Jaz Milvane.

Ed lives in precarious circumstances with his cat, Elgar, scraping a living as a hack writer by working through commissions for coffee table books such as The Brands Hatch Story and Pet Peeves, a book of celebrity pet anecdotes. Much of this work comes through his agent Felix (John Fortune), who Ed believes still owes him royalties, and Felix's assistant Ping – shortened from Pandora Ingleby-Thomas (Sally Hawkins in series 1, 3, and 4, and Barunka O'Shaughnessy in the second series and the fifth series onwards) – an archetypal Sloane Ranger who rejects the amorous advances he makes occasionally in early episodes. The character of Felix was written out in Series 7 as John Fortune died in 2013.

He makes a small income from running a creative writing course at the local night school, where his lessons frequently mention the single episode of Tenko that he wrote. Ed also earns an occasional £10 fee for taking part in identity parades at his local police station. He is an alumnus of Shrewsbury School. The programme contains many references to Berkhamsted, Hertfordshire, where Ed lives.

The theme music is a dixieland version of "Am I Blue?" It was recorded at the 606 Club in London, and performed by session musicians present.

The series is written by Christopher Douglas and Andrew Nickolds, and produced by Simon Nicholls (first three series) and Dawn Ellis (fourth series onwards). From series 16, the writer is Christopher Douglas.

== Origins of the character of Ed ==
Speaking on Pick of the Week Christopher Douglas explained where Ed's character came from: "Simon Gray's published diaries were mainly about how badly treated he'd been by producers, actors, critics and electronic machinery. His impotent rage against his employers was one of the inspirations for Ed Reardon, the character I co-write, perform and in some ways resemble. Ed often rants from the point of view of appalled gentleman author, but he can also play the thwarted radical."

== Ed's literary background ==
Ed considers himself a serious writer but there is little evidence to support his view of himself. His only novel, Who Would Fardels Bear?, was published in the 1970s, and was adapted into a film (Sister Mom) by Ed's friend, Jaz Milvane (played by Philip Jackson). Because the setting was moved from Oldham to California and the lead role was taken by Sally Field, the film's faithfulness to the novel is in doubt. Milvane is a successful British Hollywood film director in the mould of Tony Scott or Adrian Lyne. Ed's only other screen credit is a 1982 episode of the BBC wartime drama, Tenko ("Escape from the Bamboo Noose") and, based on the evidence provided in the drama so far, this may well be his only other non-coffee table book project. During his early career, Ed also wrote various stage plays, all of which seem to have been both unfortunately timed and titled, bearing striking (yet apparently accidental) resemblances to works by Willy Russell and Mike Leigh. An early amateur film made with Jaz Milvane, "The 4th Sausage" (an allusion to European New Year staple, Dinner for One), is the focus of Episode 6, Series 11.

=== Ed's books ===
- Who Would Fardels Bear?
- Came She With Fantastic Garlands (Lost)
- Jane Seymour's Household Hints
- The Brands Hatch Story
- 34 At The Last Count – the unofficial Prime Suspect book
- Pet Peeves (publisher: Sow's Ear)
- Nigel Mansell's Love Poetry
- Pet Peeves 2
- Postal Panoply (publisher: Septred Isle [sic])
- Shed 22lb in a Week the Vanessa Feltz Way
- Armando Iannucci's Carpathian Walks
- John Kettley's Big Book of Weather
- Kevin Pietersen's Big BBQ Book
- A Taste of Paraquat, The Reigate Poisoner Autobiography
- The Stig's big book of Speed Cameras (Series 7, Episode 5 & Series 11, Episode 1)
- It's Been Emotional (uncredited ghost-written autobiography of Vinnie Jones, publ Sep 2013)
- It's Been a Roller Coaster (Ghost-written autobiography of the Archbishop of Canterbury)
- Modernists Roadtrip, Antiques, and the story of discovery, potholes and loss
- Desert Orchid's autobiography
- I, Cheggars (ghost-written autobiography of Keith Chegwin (Season 14, episode 1))
- Arrows of Desire (ghost-written autobiography of Eric Bristow (Season 6, episode 2))

=== Ed's radio work ===
- The Amazing True Story Of The South Tring Bubble
- The South Tring Bubble (Reworking of the above for Hemel Sound)
- Cheese Cricket (Pilot for a radio panel show)

=== Ed's stage work ===
- Educating Peter (referencing Educating Rita)
- Stanley Valentine (referencing Shirley Valentine)
- Blood Sisters (referencing Blood Brothers)
- Alistair's Party (referencing Abigail's Party)
- The Mouserap musical (referencing The Mousetrap)

=== Ed's TV work ===
- Tenko
- Danger Mouse
- Roland Rat Christmas Special
- Holby City (original treatment)
- Japanese Night on BBC2 (un-aired, replaced by An Evening With Jaz Milvane)

== Ed's family ==
Ed has a son and a daughter, Jake and Eli, who make occasional appearances. An insight into Ed as a father is given in "The Operation" (S.2 Ep.6), where Jake complains: "that's all we ever got from you... a sarcastic one-liner followed by a 'now leave me alone to sink into a drunken stupor of self-loathing.'"

Ed's father, Sidney, (played by David Warner) made an appearance in the episode "Dad". Appearing just as bad-tempered and impatient as Ed, Sidney demonstrated more understanding of popular culture by being familiar with the children's television programme Dick and Dom in da Bungalow. He emigrated to Australia for tax reasons with a new partner, following Ed's failed attempt to secure his inheritance.

== Ed's current life ==
Ed taught a screenwriting class from Series 1 to 15, held weekly at the local sports centre, although this ended when the students all realised their assets and emigrated. This adult education group spent a lot of time giving him advice and making comments about his general lack of achievement, between complaints about being forced to watch his Tenko episode endlessly (an in-joke, as one of the class was played by Stephanie Cole, who had a leading role in Tenko). Ed also played in a Dixieland jazz band called The Bayou Boys with his more successful friends, his instrument of choice being the jug. In the first episode, Jaz sits in with them on trumpet, making Ed's contribution seem anaemic by comparison.

Ed has lived in a one-bedroom flat with his cat Elgar in Berkhamsted, in the borough of Dacorum, Hertfordshire, ever since he sold his London home after a messy divorce. This is described as "living at the cutting edge, or to be more accurate, "above The Cutting Edge", as he has a flat over a hairdressing salon of this name."

Ed was seen heading into surgery for coronary bypass (necessitated by his lifelong affair with "beer and baccy" and mature cheddar cheese) at the end of the second series, with Felix on the one hand, abetted by Jaz, pushing him to start on a new novel for Jaz to film ("Put plenty of cricket in it." says Felix) while Ping is urging him to commit to Pet Peeves 2, the fee for which will be needed to pay his hospital bill.

At the end of the first series (Ep. 5), a blossoming romance with a young woman of similar temperament was cruelly dashed by her allergy to cats, dander from which could be found in Ed's beard. At the end of the fourth series Ed became involved with the popular novelist Mary Potter (Sally Grace), spending several nights a week with her by the start of the fifth series, though by the end of the seventh series he had rekindled an old romance with Fiona (Jenny Agutter). By Series 12 his romantic focus had moved to his agency colleague, Maggie (Pippa Haywood).

== Humour ==
Much humour comes from Ed's rants and inability to stop himself from getting carried away in his angry tirades, often triggered by learning that somebody younger than him is proving more successful (such as the author of Eats, Shoots and Leaves, Lynne Truss; one tirade follows Ed receiving several copies of the book as gifts for his birthday and working out how much in royalties Truss will have received because of the book sales). Underlying this however, are observations of the injustices and stupidities ("sheer asininity") of modern life.

== Writers ==
Ed Reardon is played by actor Christopher Douglas, who also co-wrote the series with Andrew Nickolds. A spin-off book was published in November 2005.

== Awards ==
Ed Reardon's Week has twice been voted Best Radio Programme by the Broadcasting Press Guild, at their 32nd Annual Television and Radio Awards in 2006 and at the 37th in 2011.

== Critical reaction ==
Gillian Reynolds, writing for The Daily Telegraph, called Reardon a "sublime creation" who was becoming "a national treasure" in 2012, and in 2016 complimented Douglas's "sublime performance" that makes Ed Reardon the "supreme social commentator on our times". The Independent also praised it, saying it "crackled with great lines, without any of that telegraphing you get too often in Radio 4 comedy". Miranda Sawyer in The Guardian found Reardon brilliantly observed, but more annoying than funny.

== Stage version ==
Christopher Douglas and Andrew Nickolds have written a stage version, Ed Reardon: A Writer's Burden, which played at the Pleasance Courtyard during the 2011 Edinburgh Fringe Festival (An Evening with Ed Reardon.) and was directed by Adrian Lloyd-James.

== Episode list ==
Series 1 was originally broadcast on BBC Radio 4 in January and February 2005. Series 2 ran from December 2005 until January 2006, Series 3 from 15 December 2006 to 19 January 2007 and Series 4 from November 2007 to December 2007. Series 5 began weekly transmission on Radio 4 on Monday 6 October 2008 at 11:30am. Each episode is available as streaming audio over the internet, through the BBC's Listen Again service, for 30 days after broadcast.

Series 1 was repeated in August–September 2007 on BBC 7. Series 12 started airing on BBC Radio 4 in October 2017, and the latest (Series 16) began airing on Monday 30 June 2025.

Episodes are available on BBC Sounds website.

=== Series 1 ===
Episode	Title	Original Airdate	Story
1	The Swim	7 January 2005	Ed Reardon travels to London for an expensive lunch with his agent, Felix. But this ends up being 'downgraded' to a café snack with Felix's new assistant Ping. But his anger at this is soon assuaged by the offer of £2,000 to write novelty book "Pet Peeves"
2	Pulp Non-Fiction	14 January 2005	The success of "Pet Peeves" (briefly #197 on the Amazon Sales Ranking) leads to a guest spot on SAGA radio and an attempt at speed dating.
3	Holby City	21 January 2005	Urgently needing money to repair his leaking roof, Ed agrees to write and pitch a treatment for TV's 'Holby City'.
4	The Old Lock-Keeper	28 January 2005	The death of fellow writer Ted Cartwright leads to a vacant spot as writer for the local newspaper's regular column 'The Old Lock-keeper'.
5	The Winona Defence	4 February 2005	To Ed Reardon, she is always 'The Girl'
6	King of the Road	11 February 2005	Ed Reardon gets asked by his student son Jake if he can get Jaz Milvane to give a talk at his university. Which Ed agrees to, as long as he can be in charge of the Q&A.

=== Series 2 ===
Episode	Title	Original Airdate	Story
1	Rogue Mail	21 December 2005	A pyre of "Da Vinci Code"s thwarts Ed's chances of celebrity success, forcing him to accept the job of writing "Sceptred Isle Publishing"'s latest respectful royal cash-in. Guest starring Matthew Holness as Lee, Head of Sceptred Isle Publishing.
2	The Speech	28 December 2005	Ed is called upon to write two speeches. One for his daughter Ellie's wedding and another for celebrity jockey Seamus McGee to use on the After-Dinner speech circuit.
3	The Last Laugh	4 January 2006	Can Ed's photobooth travails inspire new work from the most successful comedy writing duo of the last twenty-five years, Clive Swift and Terry Savage. Guest starring Andy Hamilton as Terry Savage
4	Our Man In Berkhamsted	11 January 2006	The Berkhamsted Literary Festival is in town, much to Ed's annoyance. But can the prospect of romance persuade him to get involved?
5	A Hint of Calvados	18 January 2006	Ed's episode of Tenko gets selected to be shown on BBC Two's "Japan Night" special, opening the door to the possibility of even more paid work at the Corporation. Guest starring Chris Addison as TV boss
6	The Operation	25 January 2006	Convalescing after a heart attack, Ed might finally have the time to write his next novel.

=== Series 3 ===
Episode	Title	Original Airdate	Story
1	The Name-Check	15 December 2006	Ed discovers a way to make extra money from his new radio play commission "The South Tring Bubble". Guest Starring Sean Lock as the plumber
2	Dad	22 December 2006	With grim childhood memoirs all the rage, Ed decides to cash-in with his own fictitious tale of youthful suffering and misery. Guest starring David Warner as Sidney (Ed's father)
3	Undercover	29 December 2006	In the undercover world of espionage that is being a "Mystery Shopper", can Agent Grey Fox afford to trust anyone?
4	The Dig	5 January 2007	Ed volunteers at a live-in archaeological dig as a means of avoiding the bailiffs. This opens up opportunities in the world of pop history. Guest starring Mark Watson as Tom
5	Murder Most Rewritten	12 January 2007	Ed gets a job writing the script for a Corporate Murder Mystery Weekend. Are the middle management team from PowerSouth capable of unravelling the intricacies of "The Family Silver Mystery"?
6	The Libel Action	19 January 2007	Ed gets the perfect writing assignment - a lengthy article on the flaws and failures of Jaz Milane for a large amount of money.

=== Series 4 ===
Episode	Title	Original Airdate	Story
1	January The 31st	16 November 2007	The reports of Ed's death prove greatly exaggerated. And his return to the land of the living means he's required to complete his tax return by deadline day. Even if Jaz Milvane is shooting a major ITV drama on his street.
2	Ruth and Reconciliation	23 November 2007	Ed's insistence on a strict definition of "local author" being applied by the Berkhamsted bookshop leads to an encounter with Ruth, the daughter of an author from far-off Tring. Can Ed's seduction technique of stalking, deceit and impersonation of an Ofsted Inspector prove successful?
3	The Wrong Fleece	30 November 2007	After two stolen bottles of vodka, Ed jots down a superb, guaranteed bankable idea. Unable to remember it the next day, Ed goes on a quest to recover the lost fleece where the idea was pocketed.
4	The Old Boys Network	7 December 2007	An Old Salopian reunion dinner leads to a new commission from a fellow ex-pupil, the history of their French farmhouse in the Dordogne.
5	Role Reversal	14 December 2007	Ed signs up for cash-in-hand work roleplaying characters for training interviews. This opens doors for both opportunity and revenge.
6	Trimarans That Pass in the Night	21 December 2007	Ed seems to have found himself in a happy and healthy relationship with fellow author Mary Potter. This is not a state of affairs that Felix Jeffrey Associates can possibly tolerate.

=== Series 5 ===
Episode	Title	Original Airdate	Story
1	The Last Miaow	6 October 2008	With Mary Potter on the cusp of possible success, this is not the best time for Elgar to go missing.
2	The CV of Dorian Gray	13 October 2008	Ed is assigned by Felix Jeffrey Associates to mentor their latest signing, an actual twelve year old YouTube sensation.
3	Anger Management	20 October 2008	Ed is ghost-writing "The Armageddon Factor", a gripping action adventure set in the world of race car driving. The increasing demands for changes from Ping would normally have infuriated Ed, but this is a new relaxed, calmer Reardon thanks to anger management training.
4	Educating Peter	27 October 2008	Jaz Milvane wishes to return to his first love, theatre. And he's chosen a revival of one of Ed's early plays "Educating Peter".
5	The Great Escape	3 November 2008	Ed's enthusiasm for contributing fabricated travel pieces for "Herts & Bucks Life" magazine rises considerably when he meets its new owner Carol. Guest Starring: Rebecca Front as Carol, Lewis MacLeod as Aussie
6	Granddad	10 November 2008	It's time for Ed to take on his share of grandfatherly responsibilities. His ability to look after another human may match his ability to look after himself.Lisa Coleman as Eli

=== Series 6 ===
Episode	Title	Original Airdate	Story
1	The Charterhouse Redemption	11 January 2010	As a Charterhouse Court resident Ed faces a dilemma. A quiet, well-maintained life of retired contemplation or a return to writing.
2	Charity Begins Next Door	18 January 2010	Ed is offered work helping producing speeches for Felix Jeffrey's charity fundraiser. A perfect opportunity for his new creative writing student to learn the tricks of the trade.
3	The Cruise	25 January 2010	The Bayou Boys are hitting the High Seas as resident band on a luxury Scottish Island cruise.
4	Cheese Cricket	1 February 2010	Ed devises a brand new format to rescue Radio4's half six comedy panel show slot. But will it make it beyond the pilot?
5	A Bottle of Ulterio Motivo	8 February 2010	Ed becomes a trusted advisor to a wealthy young woman hoping to open a new theme bar in Berkhamsted. But is her interest in him more than just professional?
6	Elgar Writes	15 February 2010	Miaow

=== An Audience with Ed Reardon ===
Episode	Title	Original Airdate	
1	An Audience with Ed Reardon	20 October 2010	Before a privileged audience at the Edinburgh Festival, Ed presents extracts from some of his favourite works.

=== Series 7 ===
Episode	Title	Original Airdate	Story
1	In the Current Climate	10 January 2011	In the age of austerity, Ed gets to ghostwrite a book of tips for the hard-up.
2	From Bean to Cup	17 January 2011	Ed's stint cat-sitting for a neighbour provides him with the perfect house to impress a lady. Guest starring: Paul Merton as houseowner
3	Become a Successful Writer	24 January 2011	Having witnessed American writer Mort Rich deliver a presentation on "profitable scripting", Ed starts his own venture judging submitted manuscripts for a fee.
4	Parsnip Junction	31 January 2011	A revival of seventies children's TV show "Parsnip Junction" gives Ed the change to work on Britain's affectionately remembered railway station, staffed by equally loved vegetables. Guest starring Geoffrey Palmer as Charles Cobbold, the creator of "Parsnip Junction".
5	Writer in Residence	7 February 2011	Ed's decision to abandon Radio 3 and 4 for the more popular, and less Cambridge-centric, Radio 5 and Talksport leads to him developing a different communication style when dealing with others. Which might be just perfect for the position of 'Writer in Residence' at his son-in-law's university.
6	Summer of '76	14 February 2011	Ed makes contact with a former girlfriend via Facebook. Can he now rekindle an old flame that last burnt when they were both labelled as 'faces of the future' by the Observer magazine. Guest Starring Jenny Agutter as Fiona Templeton

=== Series 8 ===
Episode	Title	Original Airdate	Story
1	Have a Great Weekend	3 April 2012	Ed's girlfriend Fiona was once a 'bubbly stewardess' in an advert for British Caledonia airlines. On the iconic ad's thirtieth anniversary The Observer offers to send her to Paris for a reunion feature. And a plus one can come along.
2	Original British Drama	10 April 2012	The BBC are excited to learn that newly released papers reveal Crackerjack's Peter Glaze to have been a secret agent known as "The Scorpion".
3	It's a Nude Nude Nude Nude World	17 April 2012	Jaz Milvane turns sixty and asks Ed to curate a moving tribute event at the Dorchester. But finding a copy of Jaz's first film proves tricky.
4	Making a Difference	24 April 2012	Inspired by Fiona, Ed decides to stand up for his principles and launch a campaign against poor train services. Is the media ready for his unique campaigning style?
5	Rosicrucian Armageddon 2	1 May 2012	Ed's verbosity impresses Graham Pearson, designer of the Open World Video Game sensation "Rosicrucian Armageddon", so much that he's hired to work on the sequel. Guest Starring: Corrie Corfield as herself
6	Keeping the Flame Alive	8 May 2012	The Olympics are coming, and Ed faces eviction so his landlord can cash-in. Maybe helping out on Jaz Milvane's new feelgood British movie "Babes In The Pool" will get him the quick cash injection he needs.

=== Ed Reardon's Christmas Week ===
(50th episode)

Episode	Title	Original Airdate	Story
1	Ed Reardon's Christmas Week: It started in August	25 December 2012	All is not well in Ed's relationship, so he faces spending Christmas alone with just Elgar for company.

=== Series 9 ===
Episode	Title	Original Airdate	Story
1	The Personal Statement	11 Nov 2013	Hoping to patch things up with Fiona, Ed retires from writing and returns to the world of job interviews, C.V.s and personal statements. Guest starring: Melanie Hudson as Interviewer
2	The Intern	18 Nov 2013	Major changes are afoot at Felix Jeffrey Associates, which leads to Ping having to work with an annoying, enthusiastic, gossipy new colleague - Ed Reardon.
3	The Berkhamsted Job	25 Nov 2013	After a fire wrecks Ed's home (and half his beard), he begins the process of claiming on the insurance.
4	Blood of the Reardons	2 Dec 2013	Ed discovers there's money to be made in getting involved in the medical trials testing Moldova's latest miracle appetite suppressant. Guest starring Claudie Blakley as Dr Liz Newcombe, Lisa Coleman as Eli
5	Intellectual Fireworks	9 Dec 2013	Jaz Milvane opens a residential college and hires Ed as a tutor. Felicity Montagu as Rosemary, Carolyn Pickles as Maureen
6	The Bride of Auntie	16 Dec 2013	Radio4's highbrow quiz show "What Do You Know?" is always looking for intelligent contestants. And now that Ed has been banned from his local pub quiz, an extended run on the show could turn out to be profitable. Duncan Preston as Neil Hardacre, Vicki Pepperdine as Laura Pope

=== Series 10 ===
Episode	Title	Original Airdate	Story
1	The Go-To Destination	13 May 2015	Felix Jeffrey Associates has a new owner, the previous one's mother. And Suzan's first decision is to put Ed and Jaz Milvane together on the promotional video for London's newest luxury development "The Toaster". Starring Simon Greenall as Doorman, Vicki Pepperdine as Laura Pope, and Raquel Cassidy as Suzan.
2	One Man, Two Charlies	20 May 2015	Newly homeless, Ed is living as a caretaker in a warehouse for bankrupt stock. Desperately needing money, he agrees to write two different recipe books for two very different celebrity chefs. Starring Celia Imrie as Charlotte, Phaldut Sharma as Charlie
3	My Companion	27 May 2015	When an old publisher dies, Ed ends up agreeing to go to the funeral with his ex-wife Janet. The prospect of a reconciliation is not acceptable to their children. Starring Joanna Brookes as cattery woman, Nicola Sanderson as Janet, Lisa Coleman as Eli, Sam Pamphilon as Jake
4	Joan of the Junction	3 June 2015	Still homeless, Ed ends up as Second Mate on the good ship "Kill Bill", and is inspired to pitch a TV series based on his new captain, Joan. Starring Pam Ferris as Joan
5	Moby Dave	10 June 2015	There's a huge buzz in the media world about ITV's new Sunday night drama "Joan Of The Junction". Starring Pam Ferris as Joan, Jack Farthing as Jonathan
6	The New Thirty	17 June 2015	Felix Jeffrey Associates has a new owner - Ping. And Ed gets inspirational advice on what to do with his life from a dream. Starring Lisa Coleman as Eli, Sam Pamphilon as Jake, Jeremy Paxman as himself

=== Ed Reardon at Christmas ===
Episode	Title	Original Airdate	Guest star
1	Ed Reardon at Christmas: The Ghost of Christmas Books	1 January 2016	When his agents' offices are empty over Christmas, Ed can move in to finish his latest topical commission. He just has to deal with a home for Elgar and the new guest editor of the Today programme first. Guest Starring John Humphrys as himself

=== Series 11 ===
Episode	Title	Original Airdate	Story
1	The Reboot	4 October 2016	Ed is enjoying the best years of his life as a mature student sleeping in all day and watching "Homes Under The Hammer". But an encounter with Professor Antonia Sandham gives him the motive to be more sociable. Starring Sylvestra Le Touzel as Antonia Sandham.
2	All About Eve	11 October 2016	Ed becomes the editor of the University's student newspaper "Love Herts".
3	Generation Why Bother	18 October 2016	A chance encounter with an accountant gets Ed thinking about his pension.
4	The Rectifier	25 October 2016	The freedom that University provides gives Ed Reardon time to work on a new book. As no publisher seems interested in "In The Shadow Of The Workhouse: The Demonisation Of The Poor In The Age Of The Kiln-Fired Brick", Ed needs to find a way to finance self-publishing the novel.
5	Poetry! No Thanks	1 November 2016	When the University plans a statue to Beryl Bassett - the plucky wartime singer that became a national treasure - Ed breaks one of his golden rules and agrees to join a committee.
6	The 4th Sausage	8 November 2016	Ed is in trouble with the University authorities for his innovative fund-raising methods. But then he discovers that a short comedy sketch he recorded with Jaz Milvane decades earlier has become a cult sensation in Belgium. Will Wallonian royalties for "Sir Jasper's Breakfast" save his student status?

=== Series 12 ===
Episode	Title	Original Airdate	Story
1	The Writer in the Van	24 October 2017	Ping heads to the Festival circuit to sign up new young talent, leaving Ed's affairs to be run by Maggie. Her abilities as an agent immediately get him a regular column for "Your Motor Home" and, more importantly, the use of a motor home. The regular cast this series are joined by guests Monica Dolan, Vicki Pepperdine, Don Gilet, Karl Theobald and Tyger Drew-Honey.
2	Diabetes Day	31 October 2017	Ping's urgent need to match her friends' daily step count and Ed's urgent need to improve his health leads to a neat deal.
3	The Legacy	7 November 2017	Ed's children are concerned he has not written a Will. Especially when his son's legal advisor "Dozza" reveals that his late father had a previously undiscovered property.
4	An Enemy of the People	14 November 2017	An encounter at the local Recycling Centre inspires Ed to run for local office.
5	How Did I Do?	21 November 2017	Ed becomes embroiled in the world of customer satisfaction surveys when trying to track down a lost package from the delivery company "Lickety Click"
6	A Different Direction	28 November 2017	Romance is blossoming with Maggie. But will their own personal circumstances get in the way?

=== Series 13 ===
Episode	Title	Original Airdate	Story
1	The Wooden Spoon	30 April 2019	Ed's plan to write "S for Sparrowhawk" is thwarted by a hungry Elgar, his relations with Maggie complicated by his method of getting free meals and his home life dealing with the need for a home.
2	The Ed Talk	7 May 2019	Ed recalls he once lent £5 to his school friend Jeff Dayton. Who is now the millionaire inventor Jeff Daytona. Time to get his money back. Plus interest. Guest starring Colin McFarlane as Jeff Daytona
3	Bezzies	14 May 2019	Ed and Jaz Milvane get teamed up to star in the new reality show "Bezzies", where Best Friends have to compete to solve challenging tasks in a remote Scottish location.
4	Planned Parenthood	21 May 2019	Ed's son Jake is going to be a father and so urgently needs more content to fill his latest website "Stranger Than Fact". While Ping is on the search for a donor to help her with her dream of being a mother.
5	Punk Rock Vampires	28 May 2019	Andy Pond, the Professor of Sitcom at South Herts University, is hoping to win a lottery grant to help showcase the numerous cult horror films shot at Deadnettle House (cp. Oakley Court / Bray Studios). So Ed's role as script-writer on "Punk Rock Vampires" could prove invaluable.
6	The Bed Blocker	4 June 2019	Following an accident involving a mobility scooter, gatepost, alcohol and Ping - Ed is in hospital with two broken legs. Given the bed, food and company, Ed plans to make his stay last as long as possible.

=== Ed Reardon at Christmas ===
Episode	Title	Original Airdate	Story
1	Ed Reardon's 2020 Christmas Week: Upstairs Room At The Inn	22 December 2020	It's nearly Christmas, and Ed needs a room at the inn. The Lock Keeper's Arms, that is. But first, he's got to deal with "Screege".

=== Series 14 ===
Episode	Title	Original Airdate	Story
1	Prosecco o'Clock	8 June 2021	In these 'unprecedented times' Ed is enjoying unprecedented times himself as he has become financially independent and is living in a superb stylish capsule urban living unit.
2	You're Cancelled	15 June 2021	Ed's son Jake tries to enlist his fathers' help, egged on by Ed's writing class who insist he and Jake could be like 'those two Whitehall fellas'. However, Ed is distracted when an unexpected meeting leads to the renewal of an old acquaintance who is now on probation...
3	The Jethro Tree	22 June 2021	Ed becomes an activist when he joins his daughter Eli on a protest to save an ancient oak tree.
4	Battleaxe	29 June 2021	Ping asks Ed to write her granny's memoirs insisting she has Great British Battleaxe potential and could be a national treasure.
5	Elgar's Nose	6 July 2021	Whilst Ed is enjoying his new lifestyle afforded to him by his pension Elgar, his trusty feline companion, develops a nasty sneeze.
6	Platinum Writer	13 July 2021	Back on his uppers, Ed finds himself having to choose between a project with Jaz Milvain, or with Maggie...

=== Series 15 ===
Dedicated to co-writer Andrew Nickolds, who died mid-way through writing this series.

Episode	Title	Original Airdate	Story
1	The Storyteller	13 July 2023	Ed is alone following the death of Elgar (at 25). Can looking after a cat for new student Winnie help him heal?
2	Pallet Wood Inspirations	20 July 2023	Maggie introduces Ed to the world of pallet wood.
3	The Bromance	27 July 2023	Ed meets a fan and new friend, Derek, at the pool, despite Ping's warnings and Jake's discouragement. Guest Starring Robert Powell as Derek.
4	Ed In Paris	3 August 2023	Ed heads for Paris, while Jaz is letting everyone know that he is heading to The Lords.
5	Ed Reardon Is On Fire!	10 August 2023	It's been sixteen weeks and four days now since the death of Elgar and Ed needs a distraction.
6	The Mousetrap	17 August 2023	Ed has resorted to DIY pest control now that Elgar & the downstairs cat have both ceased all activities. Meanwhile, opportunities for independent production beckon...

=== Series 16 ===
Episode	Title	Original Airdate	Story
1	A Crumbling Ediface	30 June 2025	Ed seeks a new source of income to replace the one he's lost from his writing class, now cancelled after all the third age students' property wealth became so vast they all relocated to Dubai. Never one to be defeated, Ed applies for an ostler's job at The Countrywoman magazine and clears his storage cupboard to illegally sub-let it as an 'opportunity for boutique capsule living'. He may be lucky and get a human being to live there – or maybe an actor.
2	A Pigeon In Sainsbury's	07 July 2025	Ed rediscovers an old radio play, becomes involved in a battle re-enactment society and faces the very serious decision of finding a name for his new life partner - the offspring of Elgar. Guest Starring Stephen Mangan as Stephen Mangan.
3	'Gen Ed'	14 July 2025	Ed throws himself into his new role as Theatre Critic for 'The Countrywoman'. Guest Starring Robert Powell as Sir Peter.
4	Artificial Asininity	21 July 2025	Ed rages against the world of artificial intelligence when he takes on a show with Jaz Milvain.
5	For the Sake of the Planet	28 July 2025	Ed is offered a role as 'Writer in Residence' - but is he on the wrong side of the fence?
6	Blocked!	04 August 2025	Ed has finally decided that enough is enough and has decided to stop writing. For good. Unless Zadie Smith can convince him otherwise.

== Cast list ==
- Ed Reardon – Christopher Douglas
- Jaz Milvane – Philip Jackson
- Ping (Pandora Ingleby-Thomas) – Sally Hawkins (series 1, 3 & 4); Barunka O'Shaughnessy (series 2 and 5 onwards).
  - Ping has a sister Py (Pyrocanthus) who appears in the Series 7 episode "Parsnip Junction", played by Katy Wix.
- Eli – Lisa Coleman
- Jake – Sam Pamphilon
- Felix – John Fortune (Final appearance in "Writer in Residence", Series 7 prior to John Fortune's death in 2013)
- Olive – Stephanie Cole (Series 1–14); Sally Grace (Series 15)
- Pearl – Rita May (Series 1–8); Alison Steadman (Series 9); Brigit Forsyth (Series 10–14)
- Stan – Geoffrey Whitehead
- Suzan – Raquel Cassidy (Series 10)
- Fiona – Jenny Agutter (Series 7 onwards)
- Maggie – Pippa Haywood (Series 12 onwards)
- Winnie – Ellen Thomas (Series 15)
