= The News at Bedtime =

BBC Radio comedy series

- A screenshot of an online trailer for The News at Bedtime featuring Jack Dee (left) as John Tweedledum and Peter Capaldi (right) as Jim Tweedledee.
- Other names: News at Bedtime
- Running time: 15 minutes
- Country of origin: United Kingdom
- Language: English
- Home station: BBC Radio 4
- Starring: Jack Dee; Peter Capaldi; Lucy Montgomery; Vicki Pepperdine; Dan Tetsell; Lewis MacLeod; Alex MacQueen
- Written by: Ian Hislop; Nick Newman
- Produced by: Simon Nicholls
- Recording studio: Maida Vale Studios
- Original release: 24 December 2009 – 31 December 2010
- No. of series: 1
- No. of episodes: 8
- Opening theme: A remix of the BBC News theme playing "Twinkle Twinkle Little Star".
- Website: BBC website

The News at Bedtime is a satirical comedy series on BBC Radio 4 written by Ian Hislop and Nick Newman, writers of the satirical Private Eye magazine. The series is a spoof of news programs, in particular shows such as The Today Programme, set in "Nurseryland", a place in which all nursery rhymes and children's stories are real. The News at Bedtime stars Jack Dee and Peter Capaldi as the main newsreaders, John Tweedledum and Jim Tweedledee. The series was broadcast over the Christmas period in 2009, from Christmas Eve 2009 to New Year's Day 2010 with a special "Year in Review" episode broadcast on 31 December 2010.

== Plot ==
The News at Bedtime is a news programme broadcast from the magical world of Nurseryland, in which nursery rhymes and children's stories are real. The main news readers are John Tweedledum and Jim Tweedledee, who both make it clear that they dislike each other. Tweedledum sees himself as more professional, compared to Tweedledee who likes celebrity culture. Whenever Tweedledum gets annoyed by Tweedledee (or vice versa), he hits him with a toy rattle. The other main contributors to the program are Mary Mary, the Contrary Correspondent who reports live from news stories; Peter Rabbi who presents the Thought for the Day religious slot; and weather reporter Dilly Dilly.

== Production ==
The News at Bedtime is written by the editor of Private Eye and his close friend and sometime Private Eye contributor Nick Newman, and was inspired by a column they had written for the magazine. Newman said of the writing process that when writing for Private Eye, they find a news story and then a nursery rhyme to fit it. However, for the radio series the process was reversed, "because it's timeless, rather than topical (though there is an element of topicality about it)."

Newman also said: "It's such a mad world, nursery rhymes, when you think about it logically. There's quite an interesting story behind some of them. Like Humpty Dumpty - we all think it's about an egg falling off a wall. But really, Humpty Dumpty was a cannon in the English Civil War that one of the sides managed to blow up, and it fell. So all the King's horses and all the King's men couldn't put Humpty together again - that's the origins of it. Some of these stories are true, and real news events. Part of the oral tradition of news!"

== Reception ==
The show has been received well by critics. Tom Cole in the Radio Times wrote: "The News At Bedtime is an almost hypnologic take on the conventions of a modern radio news program, which presents streams of dreamlike absurdity with a staunchly straight face. While the content is a little silly at times, comedy fans and news junkies will still find plenty to enjoy."

Jane Thynne said in The Independent: "You wouldn't need to be a Today aficionado to find this series a delight... All of it was pitch perfect, totally inventive, and very funny."

== Episodes ==
No.	Title	Original release date
1	"Episode 1"	24 December 2009
John Tweedledum, Jim Tweedledee and Mary Mary report on the scandal of Jack and his genetically modified beanstalk.
2	"Episode 2"	25 December 2009
It is Christmas in Nurseryland, and as everyone prepares for the Christmas Message from The Queen of Hearts, The News at Bedtime reports on the ongoing strike action threatened by Santa Claus over modernisation.
3	"Episode 3"	28 December 2009
In a special episode, The News at Bedtime cover the nutrition of Nurseryland, interviewing food campaigner Jack Sprat and with Mary Mary covering the news that a house made from sweets is to be demolished because it is unhealthy.
4	"Episode 4"	29 December 2009
Jim Tweedledee reports live from Mooston as the world prepares for a space mission which will see the first cow to jump over the Moon.
5	"Episode 5"	30 December 2009
Mary Mary reports on a medical operation to try and save the live of an old lady who swallowed a fly, while John Tweedledum interviews Gregory Griggs about the death of Cock Robin.
6	"Episode 6"	31 December 2009
There is a disturbing news about the death of an egg sat on a wall, so Mary Mary attempts to interview one of the king's horses and one of the king's men.
7	"Episode 7"	1 January 2010
It is New Year's Day and the riot police are called upon during the Teddy Bears' Picnic.
8	"Special: The Year in Review"	31 December 2010
Co-news anchors John Tweedledum (Jack Dee) and Jim Tweedledee (Peter Capaldi) host a very special review of the previous year in Nursery Land.
