= Christopher Douglas (British actor) =

British actor and writer

Christopher Douglas (born c.1955) is a British actor and writer.

He is the voice of Ed Reardon in BBC Radio 4's long-running sitcom Ed Reardon's Week, which he co-wrote with Andrew Nickolds. Ed Reardon's Week has completed sixteen series and was the winner of the Broadcasting Press Guild's "Best Radio Programme" award in 2005 and again in 2010. Douglas is also the voice and co-creator of the world's most disappointing cricketer Dave Podmore, a Radio 4 regular since 2001.

Other radio credits include a two-part adaptation of George Gissing's New Grub Street, two series of Mastering The Universe, co-written with Nick Newman and starring Dawn French. With Nicola Sanderson, he co-wrote three series of the radio comedy, Beauty Of Britain, starring Jocelyn Jee Esien.

Douglas wrote and directed the improbably long-running career of Nicholas Craig (Nigel Planer), whose autobiography I, An Actor was first published in 1988, and who has continued to appear on TV and on stage ever since.

== Background ==
Douglas was the son of actor, director and TV producer Douglas Neill and of Carol Howard-Eady, an actress and stage manager. Douglas's step-father Derek Clark was briefly an actor before becoming a director and producer, retiring in 1992 as Director of Programmes for HTV.

Douglas was educated at Downs Preparatory School and Clifton College. He left school at 15 to work as an assistant stage manager in various regional theatres, such as Porthcawl, Ilfracombe, Bristol Old Vic, Worcester and the Wyvern, Swindon, where he made his performing debut as the back end of Alfred the Horse. In 1972, he joined the Young Vic company as an acting assistant stage manager. He took up writing in 1979 but continued to work as an actor. He is secretary of the Weekenders Cricket Club.

== Writing credits ==
THEATRE

- Theatrical Digs (Edinburgh and New End, 1981)
- Scout's Honour (Lyric Hammersmith 1987 - Best Comedy nomination, Standard Drama Awards)
- An Evening with Nicholas Craig starring Nigel Planer (Hampstead Theatre, National Theatre and touring 1988–2002)
- Ed Reardon: A Writer's Burden (Edinburgh and tour 2011)

RADIO

- The Englishman Abroad (Saturday Night Theatre, 1980)
- I, An Actor... (series 1989).
- Thirty episodes of Dave Podmore, co-written with Nick Newman and Andrew Nickolds (1997-2018)
- "Life, Death and Sex with Mike and Sue" (1999), two series of Mastering the Universe, with Nick Newman (2005 & 2009)
- Ed Reardon's Week, co-written with Andrew Nickolds (2004– to date)
- Dolly (Radio 4 Afternoon Play, 2009)
- three series of Beauty of Britain, co-written with Nicola Sanderson (2009–12)
- New Grub Street (two-part adaptation, 2016)
- "Tristram Shandy: In Development" (Drama On 4).

TV

- Tygo Road (co-written with Richard Cottan, BBC 2 series 1990)
- The Naked Actor (BBC 2 series 1991)
- The Nicholas Craig Masterclass (BBC 2 series 1992)
- It's Not Cricket with Rory Bremner (BBC 2 1998)
- The Age Thing (BBC pilot starring Patricia Hodge and Hugh Bonneville 1998)
- A Master Class in Film Villiany [sic] with Nicholas Craig (2003) (BBC 1 2003)
- How to be Eighteenth-Century (BBC4 and BBC2 2006)
- How to be Sci-Fi (BBC4 2006)
- The Rock and Roll Years (BBC1 pilot 2006)
- Mark Lawson Interviews Nicholas Craig (BBC4 2008)
- How to be Edwardian (BBC4 2007)
- How to be Old (BBC4 2009)

BOOKS

- Spartan Cricketer, a biography of D.R.Jardine (George Allen & Unwin 1984. Reissued by Methuen in 2002 and 2003)
- I, An Actor... (Pavilion Books 1988, Pan Books 1989 and Methuen 2001, reissued 2008 and again in 2017)
- Pod Almighty! (Simon and Schuster 1996)
- The Word of Pod, (Collected columns from The Guardian, Methuen 2002)
- Ed Reardon’s Week (Simon & Schuster 2005, paperback 2006)
- ghosted ...and June Whitfield (Transworld 2000)

JOURNALISM

- Guardian columnist (as Dave Podmore) 1996–2006
- Numerous articles for The Guardian, Times, Independent, Telegraph, Mail on Sunday, Wisden and The Wisden Cricketer

DIRECTING

- I, An Actor… stage show 2002
- Series 2 of The Nicholas Craig Masterclass (BBC2 1992)
- "How to be Eighteenth-Century" (BBC4 and BBC2 2006)
- How to be Sci-Fi (BBC4 2006)
- How to be Edwardian (BBC4 2007)
- Mark Lawson Interviews Nicholas Craig (BBC4 2007)
- How to be Old (BBC4 2009)

== Presenting ==
- Pick of the Week Radio 4
- Comedy Club Radio 4 Extra
- Timeshift BBC2
- "The London Residences of George Gissing" (2016)
- "200 Years of The Cumberland Market" (2016)

=== Acting credits ===
- THEATRE: seasons at The Young Vic, Cheltenham and Birmingham.
- FILM: The Hireling (Dir. Alan Bridges, 1972). Penda's Fen (Dir. Alan Clarke, 1973).
- SHORTS: Dave Podmore in the Fast Lane and Dave Podmore in the Pressure Cooker (Hat Trick 2004), Dave Podmore's Top Cricket Tips (2015),
- TV: Fathers and Families, Secret Army, Cats Eyes, Matilda's England, Crossroads (100+ episodes as Martin, the cheeky barman), Crown Court, Rooms, The Flockton Flyer, four series as Samuel Onedin in The Onedin Line (1977–80), Radio, The Lenny Henry Show, Reilly, Ace of Spies, The Bill, Casualty, Early Travellers to America, The Bill and Sean Show (Hat Trick pilot), Lead Balloon (BBC2 2007), Hey Hey We’re the Monks! (BBC2 2008).
- RADIO: Member of BBC Radio Drama Company 1983–84. I, An Actor... (Radio 4 series 1989). Twenty-seven Dave Podmore shows (Radio 5 and 4 1997–2017). Mastering the Universe with Dawn French (2006/08). Club of Queer Trades (2005) London Life (2006), Peacefully in Their Sleeps (2007). Gus MacDonald (2008). Dolly (2009). Brian Gulliver's Travels (2011). Beauty of Britain (2009–12).

== Publications ==
- Douglas, Christopher (2003). Douglas Jardine: Spartan Cricketer. Methuen. ISBN 978-0-413-77226-8.
