= Ian Hislop =

British journalist, satirist and television personality (born 1960)

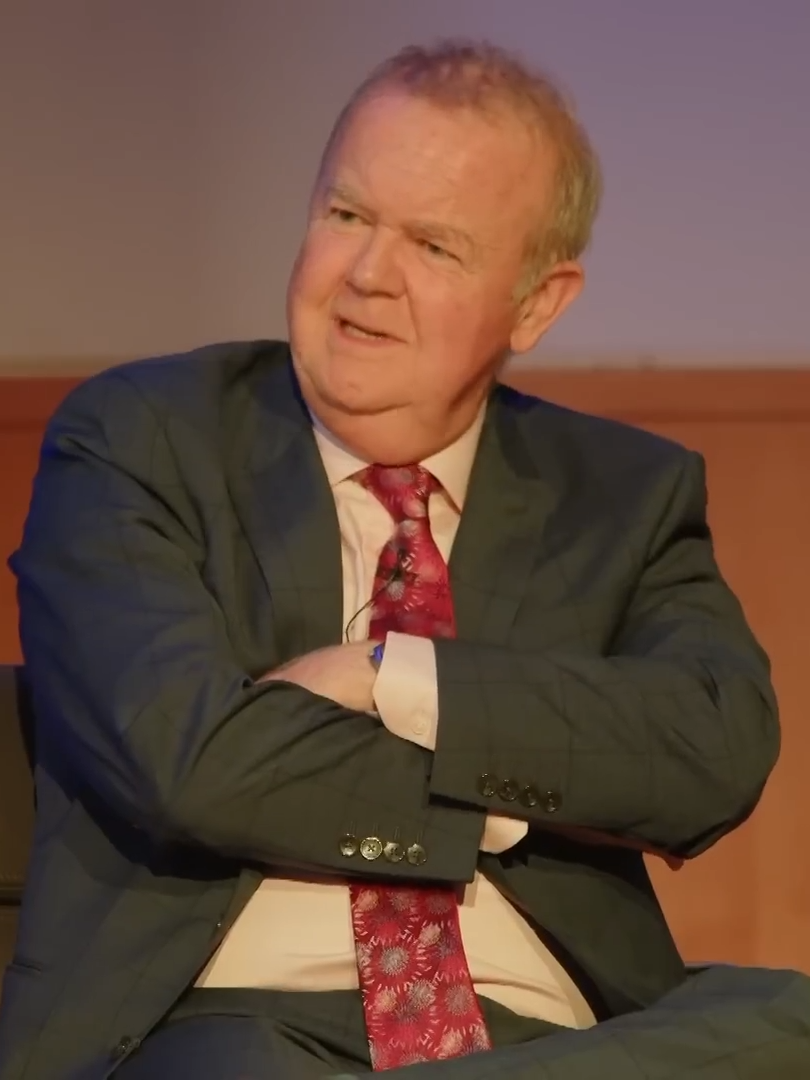
- Hislop in 2022
- Born: Ian David Hislop; 13 July 1960 (age 66); Mumbles, Swansea, Wales
- Education: Magdalen College, Oxford (BA)
- Occupations: Magazine editor; screenwriter; journalist; comedian; columnist
- Employer: Pressdram Ltd (Private Eye)
- Known for: Private Eye; Have I Got News for You; Spitting Image
- Spouse: Victoria Hamson (m. 1988)
- Children: 2, including Will Hislop

Ian David Hislop (born 13 July 1960) is a British journalist, satirist and television personality. He is the editor of the satirical magazine Private Eye, a position he has held since 1986. He has appeared on many radio and television programmes and has been a team captain on the BBC satirical quiz show Have I Got News for You since its inception in 1990 and remains the only person to appear in all of its episodes as the other team captain Paul Merton did not appear in 7 of the 8 episodes of series 11 (1996). Hislop has frequently been involved in legal battles, as Private Eye has often been sued for libel over the years.

== Early life ==
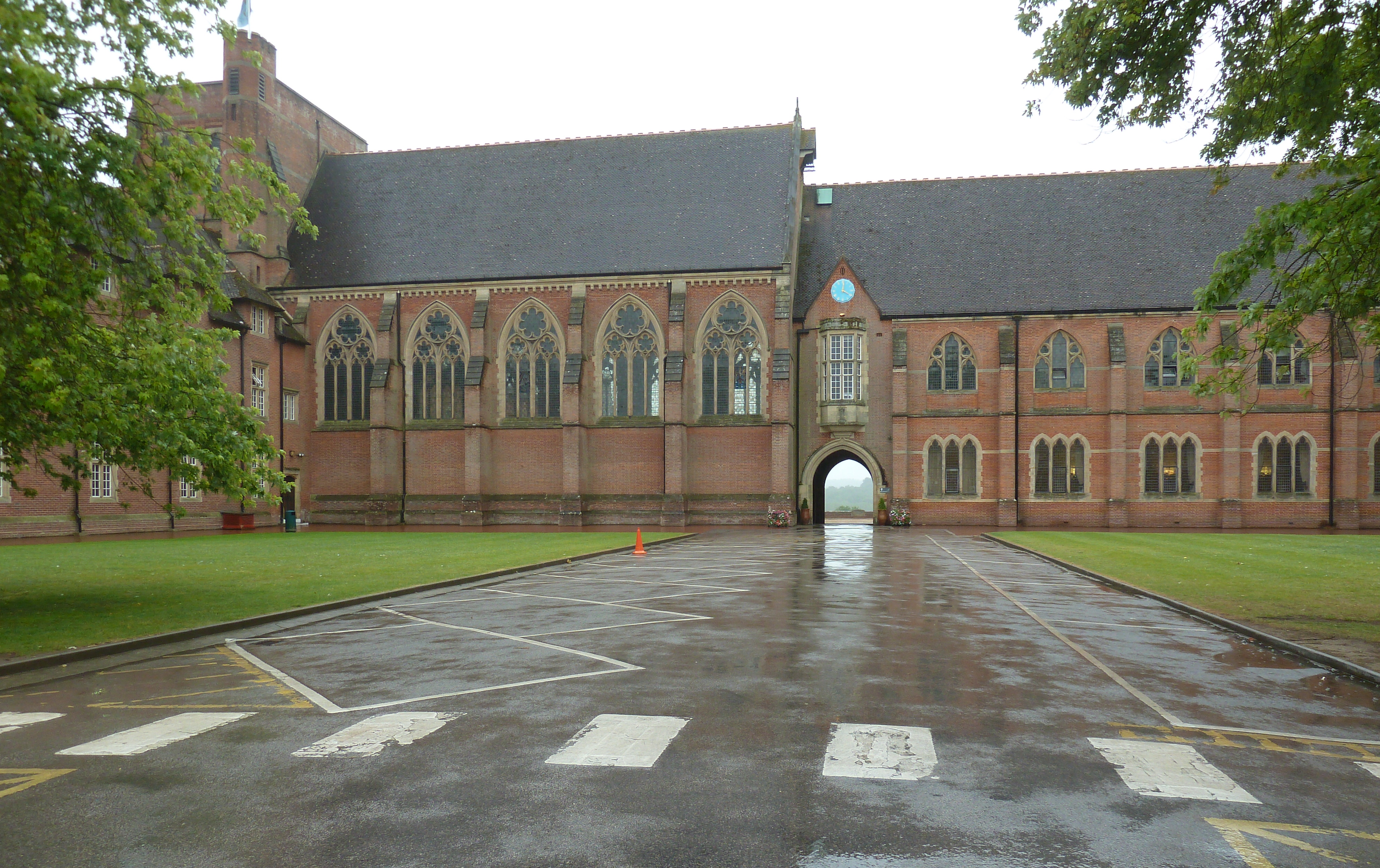
Ardingly College in West Sussex

Hislop was born on 13 July 1960 in Mumbles, Swansea, to a Scottish father, David Hislop, from Ayrshire, and a Channel Islander mother born in Jersey, Helen Rosemarie Hislop (née Beddows), who left for Wales in her late teens.

Hislop did not know his grandparents. His paternal grandfather, David Murdoch Hislop, died just before he was born. His maternal grandfather, William Beddows, was originally from Lancashire.

When he was five months old, Hislop's family began to travel around the world because of his father's job as a civil engineer. During his infant years, Hislop lived in Nigeria, Kuwait, Saudi Arabia, and Hong Kong. Hislop has said he possibly went to school with Osama bin Laden while in Saudi Arabia. When Hislop was 12 years old his father died; his mother died when he was 32. On his return to Britain he was educated at Ardingly College, an independent boarding school, where he became head boy, and began his satirical career directing and appearing in revues alongside Nick Newman.

Hislop's and Newman's association continued when they attended Oxford University together; later they worked together at Private Eye and on comedy scriptwriting jobs. Hislop applied to read philosophy, politics and economics at Oxford, but changed to English literature before arriving at Magdalen College. His Oxford tutors included Bernard O'Donoghue, John Fuller and David Norbrook. While at university, Hislop was actively involved in student journalism; he relaunched and edited the satirical magazine Passing Wind. He graduated with a 2:1 in 1981.

== Career ==
=== Private Eye ===
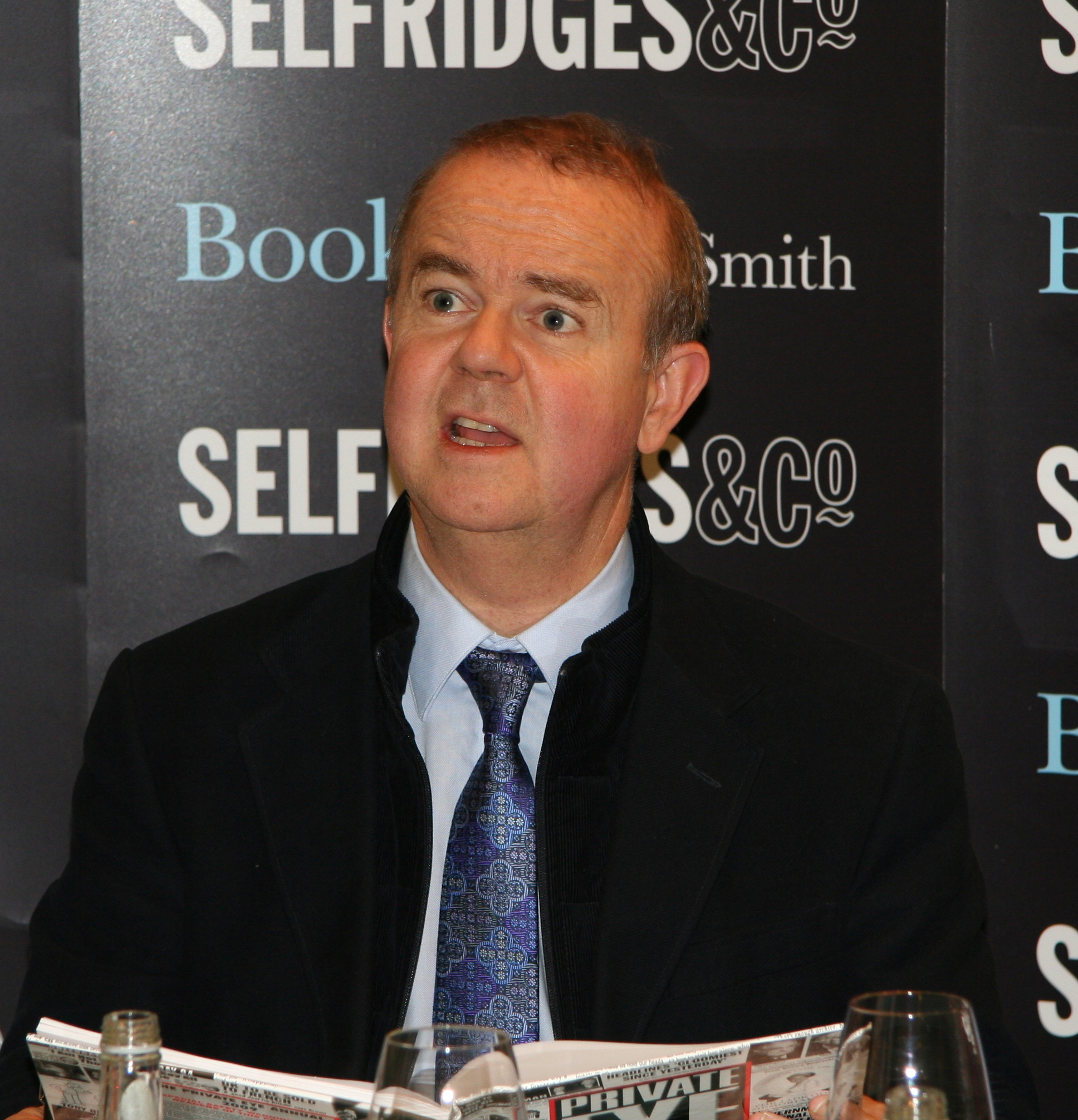
Hislop at a Private Eye book signing in 2009

At Oxford, Hislop revived and edited the magazine Passing Wind, for which he interviewed Richard Ingrams, who was then editor of Private Eye, and Peter Cook, then the majority shareholder. Hislop's first article in the Eye appeared in 1980 before he sat his university finals. A parody of The Observer magazine's "Room of My Own" feature, it described an IRA prisoner on the dirty protest decorating his cell in "fetching brown". Hislop joined the publication immediately after leaving Oxford, and became editor in 1986 following Ingrams's departure. This met opposition from Eye journalists Peter McKay and Nigel Dempster, who attempted a revolt against Hislop with the former taking Peter Cook out for lunch in an attempt to dissuade him from appointing Hislop. Cook, reportedly drunk after the lunch, instead announced Hislop was "welcome aboard". The new editor, dismissive of society gossip, sacked both McKay and Dempster from the magazine without hesitation.

As editor of Private Eye, Ian Hislop is reputedly the most sued man in English legal history. A libel case was brought against Private Eye and Hislop in 1986 by the publisher Robert Maxwell after the magazine accused him of funding Labour leader Neil Kinnock's travel expenses as a means of gaining a peerage. After the case Hislop quipped: "I've just given a fat cheque to a fat Czech". After his death in 1991, Maxwell was revealed to be an extensive fraudster, illegally drawing on his companies' pension funds; his last writ for libel against the Eye and Hislop was about this "malicious" and "mendacious" claim.

Another libel case in May 1989 threatened the magazine's existence when it was ordered to pay £600,000 in damages following an action for libel by Sonia Sutcliffe, wife of the Yorkshire Ripper, Peter Sutcliffe. Hislop told reporters waiting outside the High Court: "If that's justice, then I'm a banana." The award was dropped to £60,000 on appeal. In an interview with Third Way magazine in 1995 he explained his intentions in his work: "Satire is the bringing to ridicule of vice, folly and humbug. All the negatives imply a set of positives. Certainly in this country, you only go round saying, 'That's wrong, that's corrupt' if you have some feeling that it should be better than that. People say, 'You satirists attack everything.' Well, we don't, actually. That's the whole point."

In April 2017, Hislop won the London Press Club's print journalist of the year award; in his acceptance speech he said that Private Eye obtaining its best ABC sales figures since the magazine's launch 55 years earlier proved that "journalism is A, worth doing, and B, worth paying for both in terms of paying journalists and the public paying up for it".

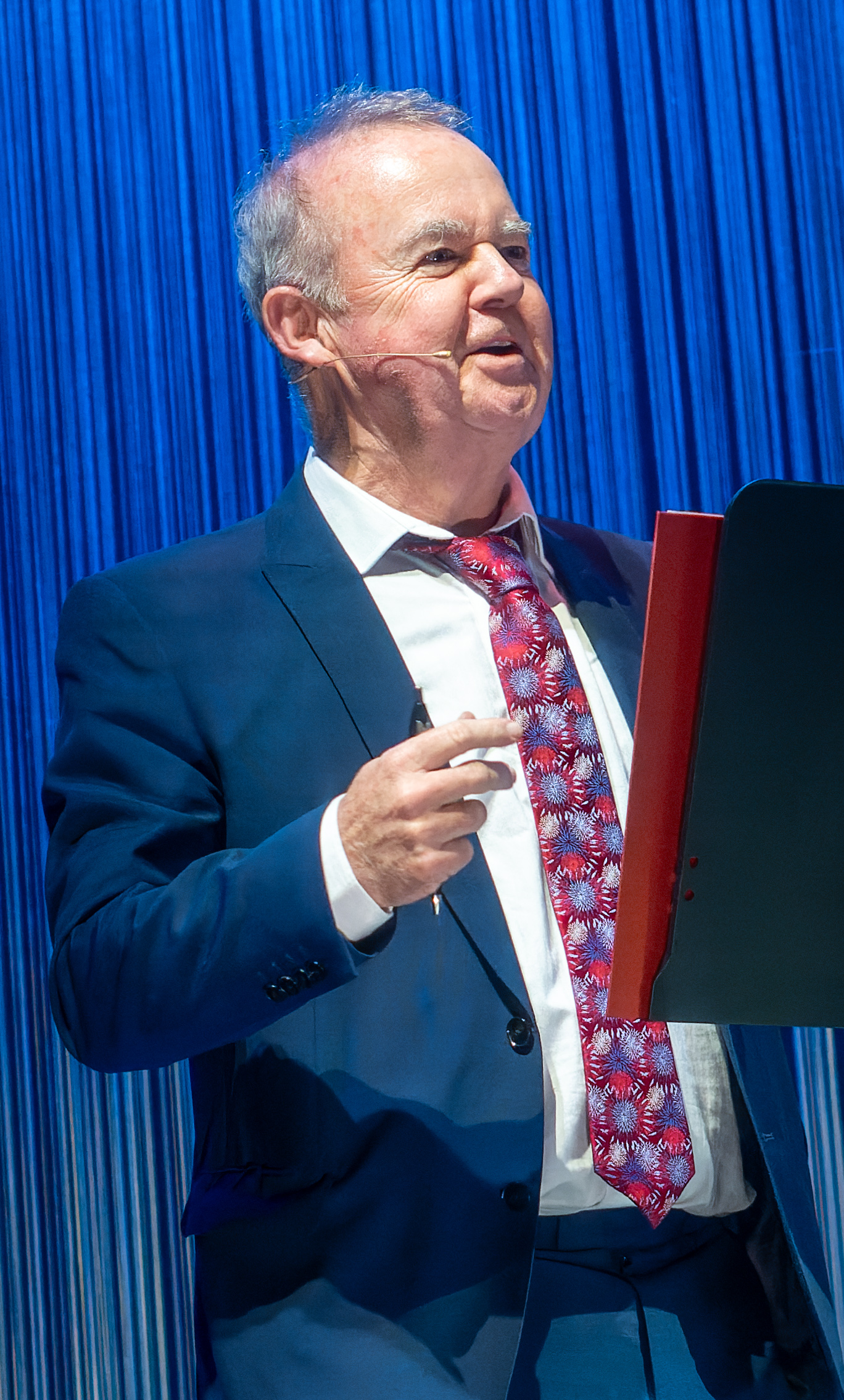
Hislop speaking at An Evening With Private Eye in 2023

In January 2022, Hislop alongside fellow Eye journalists Richard Brooks and Solomon Hughes presented evidence on MPs' conduct to the House of Commons' Standards Committee.

=== Bibliography and plays ===
Hislop is credited as the author of the recent Private Eye annuals.

- The Wipers Times (2016), a play based on the WWI newspaper, by Hislop and Nick Newman.
- A Bunch of Amateurs (2017) by Hislop and Nick Newman.
- I Object: Ian Hislop's Search for Dissent (2018) by Hislop and Tom Hockenhull.
- Trial by Laughter (2018), a play on the trials of William Hone, by Hislop and Nick Newman, originally broadcast in 2017 on BBC Radio 4.
- Spike (2022), a play about Spike Milligan during the period he was writing The Goon Show, by Hislop and Nick Newman.

=== Television and radio work ===
Hislop's television debut was on the short-lived Channel 4 chat show Loose Talk in 1983, an experience he disliked so much that he included it on his list of most hated items when he first appeared on the BBC show Room 101. Hislop, usually in partnership with Nick Newman, was a scriptwriter on the 1980s political satire series Spitting Image, in which puppets were used to depict well-known figures, mostly politicians. He even had a puppet of himself, which sometimes appeared as a background character in sketches.

Hislop has been a team captain on Have I Got News for You, against the team led by Paul Merton, since it began in 1990. He is the only person to have appeared in every episode of its run, even filming an episode in the seventh series in spite of suffering from appendicitis, when he had discharged himself from hospital immediately before the show.

With regular writing partner Nick Newman, Hislop wrote the BBC Radio 4 series Gush, a satire based on the first Gulf War, in the style of Jeffrey Archer. With Newman he also wrote the family-friendly satirical sitcom My Dad's the Prime Minister and in the early nineties for the Dawn French vehicle Murder Most Horrid. Hislop and Newman wrote the Radio 4 series The News at Bedtime, a satire on fairy tales which aired over the 2009 Christmas season. The series starred Jack Dee as John Tweedledum and Peter Capaldi as Jim Tweedledee; the two present the "news of the day" in the world of fairy tales, while arguing with each other as did their namesakes.

Hislop has presented serious television programmes. These include School Rules, a three-part Channel 4 study on the history of British education; an edition of the BBC's Who Do You Think You Are?, in which he attempted to trace his ancestry, and Not Forgotten, a four-part series on Channel 4 detailing the impact on British society of the First World War. A further programme, Not Forgotten: Shot at Dawn, was broadcast in January 2007, and a sixth episode, Not Forgotten: The Men Who Wouldn't Fight, featuring the stories of conscientious objectors such as Ronald Skirth, was aired on 10 November 2008. He also presented one episode of the BBC's Great Railway Journeys, in which he travelled in India ("India East to West" from Calcutta to Rajasthan). In May 2007 he presented a programme on BBC Four, Ian Hislop's Scouting for Boys, celebrating Robert Baden-Powell's book which inspired the Scout movement (he is also an Ambassador for The Scout Association).

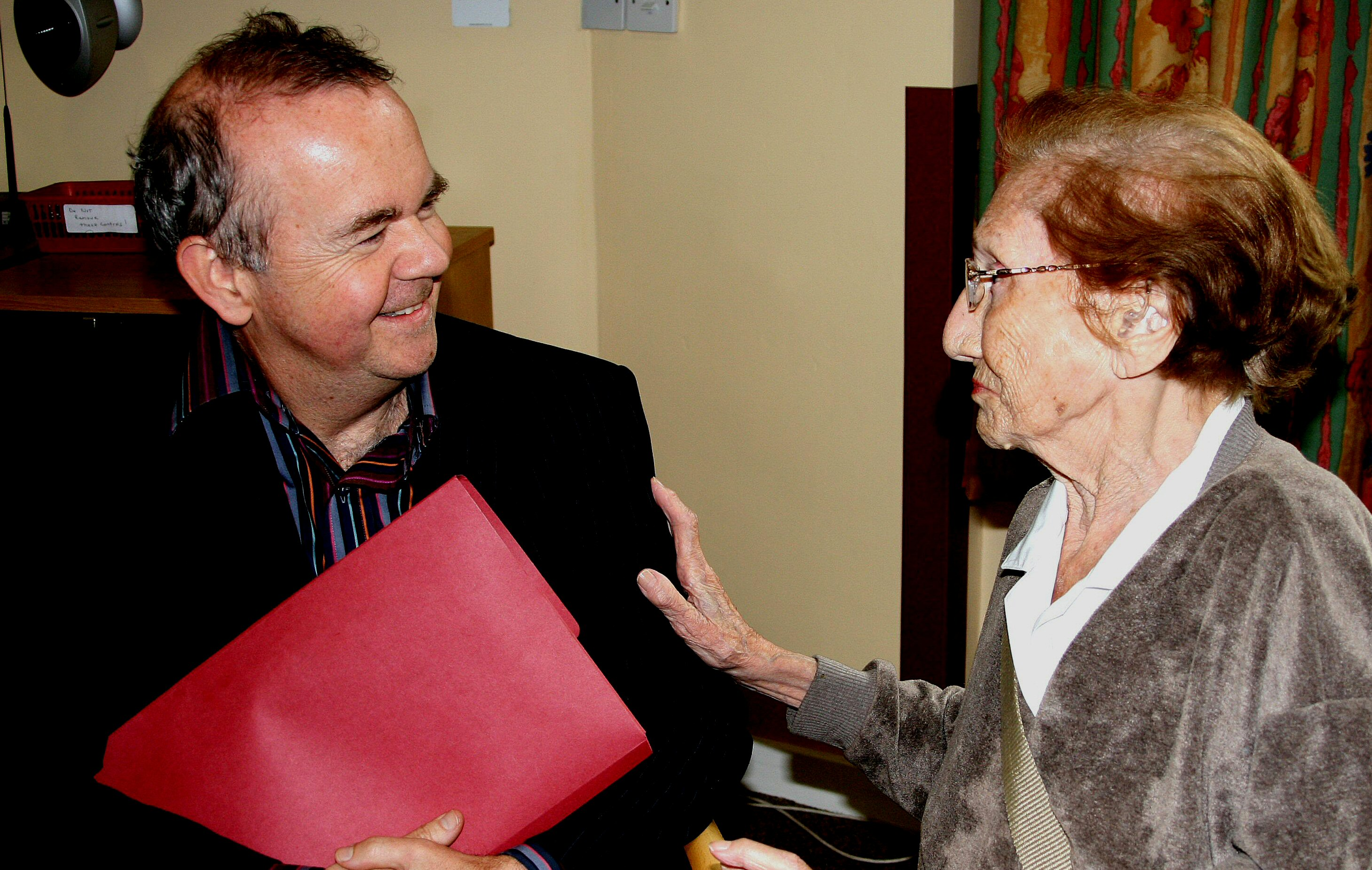
Hislop chatting with a resident at Nightingale House, Wandsworth Common, London, 2008

He has also written and presented factual programmes for Radio 4 about such subjects as tax rebellions, female hymn composers, scouting and patron saints of Britain and Ireland. In 2007 he became the only person to make a second guest appearance on Room 101. He has also been a screenwriter for comedian Harry Enfield. In 2010, Hislop played a small role in the Greek television series The Island, which was based on his wife's bestselling novel. The series premiered on 11 October 2010 on Greece's Mega television channel.

Hislop has presented several programmes for BBC Four, dealing with topics such as the Beeching Axe and the role of the Poet Laureate. The former, Ian Hislop Goes off the Rails, about the Beeching Report and its impact on the British railway network, was first aired on 2 October 2008, and achieved the second-highest audience to date for any BBC Four programme (and the highest for a documentary) with 1.3 million viewers. The latter, Ian Hislop's Changing of the Bard, launched the May 2009 BBC Four Poetry season, and Hislop recounted the history of the post from the first official holder, John Dryden, to the then recently announced first female, first Scot and first openly bisexual laureate, Carol Ann Duffy. His series on Victorian social reformers, Ian Hislop's Age of the Do-Gooders, aired on BBC Two beginning on 29 November 2010. His programme on the history of banks, When Bankers were Good, first aired on BBC Two in November 2011, and dealt with famous bankers from history, such as the Rothschilds, the Gurneys and the Lloyds, as well as 19th-century philanthropists and reformers such as Charles Dickens and Elizabeth Fry.

He has also appeared on Question Time. In one edition he made an open attack on Jeffrey Archer, who had been imprisoned for perjury, when his wife, Mary Archer, was a fellow panellist. She was noticeably angry that the matter had been raised. In 2004, Question Time's 25th anniversary celebrations included a vote in which viewers chose the confrontation as the best moment in the programme's history; it won 51% of the votes, double the number for the second-placed entry. In another episode he criticised the premise of capital punishment, something which had been advocated by Conservative panel member Priti Patel, and more recently has discussed Britain's vote to leave the European Union. In 2003 he was listed in The Observer as one of the 50 funniest acts in British comedy.

Ian Hislop's Stiff Upper Lip - An Emotional History of Britain, about how a meme for repression of emotions spread through British culture, began on 2 October 2012 and ran for three episodes on BBC Two. Beginning on 9 April 2014, Hislop presented a three-part BBC Two series Ian Hislop's Olden Days. In 2016, he presented The Secret of Beethoven's Fifth Symphony, the personal and creative story behind the symphony. Later in the same year, Hislop gave the prestigious George Orwell Lecture at London's UCL. The following year, he fronted the BBC Two documentary Who Should We Let In? Ian Hislop on the First Great Immigration Row. The programme examined attitudes to immigration from the Victorian era to the First World War.

Hislop has also curated an exhibition for the British Museum, called I Object: Ian Hislop's Search for Dissent, which was presented from 6 September 2018 to 20 January 2019. As the editor of Private Eye, Hislop has received an award for Outstanding Contribution to British Media at the Campaign British Media Awards 2019. Hislop has also been recognised for his broadcasting career, having produced TV and radio documentaries on immigration and the First World War.

== Personal life ==
Hislop married author Victoria Hamson in 1988; they have two children, Emily and Will. They lived in Sissinghurst in Kent, but later moved to Chelsea. In 2012 council planners refused Hislop's plans to extend his five-storey townhouse in Chelsea, describing the proposals as "detrimental" to both his own property and the rest of the terrace. His son, Will Hislop, is an actor, writer and stand-up comedian.

A variety of dahlia, first bred in 2010, is named "Ian Hislop" after him.

=== Religious views ===
In Caroline Chartres's book Why I Am Still an Anglican, Hislop opens his chapter by saying "I've tried atheism and I can't stick at it: I keep having doubts. That probably sums up my position." In 1996, Hislop presented an award-winning documentary series for Channel 4 about the history of the Church of England, called Canterbury Tales. His other works include the four-part BBC Radio 4 series The Real Patron Saints.

On 4 September 2009, Hislop appeared at "The Gathering", organised by the Archbishop of Canterbury, Rowan Williams, at Canterbury Cathedral to discuss religion, society and journalism, among other issues, in front of an audience of about 1,000.

=== Political views ===
Hislop has mocked all major British political parties during his career. Appearing on Question Time on 18 September 2008, he praised Liberal Democrat Treasury spokesman Vince Cable for his analysis of the 2008 financial crisis, and expressed support for the Liberal Democrats, jocularly stating "I'm standing for them".

In a 2009 "Five minutes with" interview with Matthew Stadlen for BBC News, Hislop stated that if he were required, "at the point of a gun", to stand in an election for any British political party, he would stand for the fictional "Vince Cable for Treasurer Party". After the formation of the coalition government in 2010, Hislop remarked in an interview, "I like the idea of this coalition neutralising the loonies on both sides".

He has also been highly critical of the leadership of the European Union, calling for a referendum on the Treaty establishing a Constitution for Europe in a 2003 recording of Have I Got News for You. However, referring to Britain's vote to leave the European Union, Hislop said on Question Time that "after an election or a referendum, even if you lose the vote, you are entitled to go on making the argument".

A joke on the front of Private Eye in 2016 titled "BREXIT LATEST" mocking the reaction to Brexit received "fifty or so" letters of complaint in the next issue. Hislop mocked this, saying that "There was one [letter] from a vicar, too, who told me that it was time to accept the victory of the majority of the people and to stop complaining. ... I wrote back and told him that this argument was a bit much, coming from a church that had begun with a minority of 12." He has expressed dismay over the level of public debate in the aftermath of Britain's vote to leave the EU and the 2016 election of Donald Trump, describing it as Orwellian in nature, saying that "one is unsure whether to feel relieved at the sense of déjà vu or worried about the possibility of history repeating itself, not as farce, but as tragedy again".

Media offices
Preceded by Richard Ingrams	Editor of Private Eye; 1986–present	Succeeded by Incumbent
