= Andrew Nickolds =

British comedy writer (1949–2022)

Andrew Nickolds (1949 – 2022) was a British comedy writer. He wrote for Maureen Lipman's Agony, The Lenny Henry Show, Ed Reardon's Week, and Dave Podmore.
