= List of appearances of Bob Grant on stage and screen =

Grant as Jack Harper in On the Buses

Bob Grant was an English actor, comedian and writer, best known for playing bus conductor Jack Harper in the television sitcom On the Buses, as well as its film spin-offs and stage version. He was born at Hammersmith and educated at Aldenham School. After National Service as a 2nd Lieutenant with the Royal Artillery he trained at the Preparatory Academy to the Royal Academy of Dramatic Art, Highgate, London. He entered show business as a stand-up comic, playing the halls from Chelsea Palace to the Glasgow Empire. He played in repertory at York, Horsham, High Wycombe, Leicester, Oxford and Scarborough and toured with many productions including Big Soft Nellie and Charley's Aunt. He played Kitely in the Theatre Workshop production of Ben Jonson's Every Man in His Humour both at Stratford and the Théâtre Sarah‑Bernhardt, Paris, for the 1960 Fourth International Season of the Theatre of the Nations Festival. He was awarded the best supporting performance at the festival by the Young Critics Circle.

On the London stage he appeared in Blitz! at the Adelphi, Sparrows Can't Sing at Wyndham's and Mrs. Wilson's Diary at the Criterion, and Houses By The Green at the Royal Court. He wrote and directed Instant Marriage at the Piccadilly, and appeared in No Time for Sergeants at Her Majesty's, the latter on both radio and television. He played the part of George Brown in Mrs. Wilson's Diary for London Weekend Television, and appeared in Z-Cars, Softly, Softly, and The Borderers for the BBC. He played the role of Jack Harper in all 74 episodes of On the Buses for Independent Television, and as a writer with Stephen Lewis for a number of episodes from series 5 onwards. He reprised the role for the three On the Buses feature films that followed the series. He performed in many radio plays for the BBC and also wrote and performed The Frosty-Fresh Man for BBC Radio 4 and ABC Radio Canberra. In the latter part of his career, he spent much of his time writing plays in collaboration with Anthony Marriott. In the 1990s, he became well-known to Pitlochry Festival Theatre audiences with appearances in The Little Foxes, The Cherry Orchard, A Month of Sundays, Spider's Web, and Death of a Salesman.

== Stage credits ==
=== As actor ===
This table contains Grant's known professional theatrical roles. It also contains the occasions when he both acted and directed, and on one occasion, designed the set. It does not contain those productions where he was a director but did not appear on stage. Note, roles prior to 1954 are incomplete.

Repertory theatre stage credits of Grant from 1952 – 1956
Year	Title	Theatre	Role	Notes	Ref.
1952	Worm's Eye View	Court Royal, Horsham (Note: Opened in 1912 as the Carfax Electric Theatre, and later converted to a cinema. Converted to a theatre in 1935, later known as the Court Royal, and finally the Royal, before closing in 1956.)	Sydney	Stage début. Note, Anthony Hayward for Grant's obituary in The Independent, and Ian Herbert in Grant's Who's who entry, both state that Grant's stage début was in Worm's Eye View at the Court Royal, Horsham, in November 1952. However, there was no advertised production of the play at the Court Royal for that year and it is doubtful that this was Grant's début. A production of the play was staged at the theatre from the 4 May 1953 for six days.	
1953	John Gabriel Borkman	Rudolf Steiner House	Vilhelm Foldal	Grant also produced the second act of W. S. Gilbert's Engaged (Note: Annual public performance (1953) of the Repertory Group for the Preparatory Academy to the Royal Academy of Dramatic Art.)	
1954	Night Must Fall	Tower Theatre	In repertory	First production under the directorship of Neil Gibson	
1954	The Living Room	Tower Theatre	In repertory		
1954	And This Was Odd	Tower Theatre	In repertory		
1954	The Sacred Flame	Tower Theatre	In repertory		
1954	Don't Listen Ladies	Tower Theatre	In repertory	Original play in French by Sacha Guitry. Adapted by Stephen Powys and Guy Bolton	
1954	The Return	Tower Theatre	In repertory		
1954	It's a Boy	Tower Theatre	Dudley Leake (groom)		
1954	Intimate Relations	Tower Theatre	In repertory		
1954	Trial and Error	Tower Theatre	In repertory		
1954	There's Always Juliet	Tower Theatre	In repertory		
1954	My Wife's Lodger	Tower Theatre	In repertory		
1954	Meet Mr. Callaghan	Tower Theatre	In repertory		
1954	High Temperature	Tower Theatre	In repertory		
1954	The Man	Tower Theatre	In repertory		
1954	Nothing But the Truth	Tower Theatre	In repertory		
1954	The Respectful Prostitute	Tower Theatre	In repertory		
1954	The Browning Version	Tower Theatre	In repertory		
1954	Champagne for Breakfast	Tower Theatre	In repertory		
1954	The Astonished Ostrich	Tower Theatre	In repertory	By Archie N. Menzies	
1954	One Wild Oat	Tower Theatre	In repertory		
1954	Dial M for Murder	Tower Theatre	In repertory		
1954	French for Love	Tower Theatre	In repertory		
1954	Dracula	Tower Theatre	In repertory		
1954	The Little Hut	Tower Theatre	In repertory	Adapted from the play La petite hutte by André Roussin	
1954	Summer in December	Tower Theatre	In repertory		
1954	Flare Path	Tower Theatre	In repertory		
1954	The Magistrate	York Theatre Royal	Walk on part	Grant was a former York repertory actor. York Repertory Company held a reception on the stage of the Theatre Royal to celebrate its nineteenth birthday	
1954	Lovers' Leap	Tower Theatre	In repertory		
1954	Someone Waiting	Tower Theatre	In repertory		
1954	Escapade	Tower Theatre	In repertory		
1954	Western Wind	Tower Theatre	In repertory		
1954	Romeo and Juliet	Tower Theatre	In repertory		
1954	Dear Charles	Tower Theatre	In repertory		
1954	Piccadilly Alibi	Tower Theatre	In repertory		
1954	Red Letter Day	Tower Theatre	In repertory		
1954	The Food of Love	Tower Theatre	In repertory		
1954	A Guardsman's Cup of Tea	Tower Theatre	In repertory	Written by Thomas Browne	
1954	Affairs of State	Tower Theatre	In repertory		
1955	Just William	Tower Theatre	John Brown		
1955	Me and My Girl	Tower Theatre	Lupino Lane		
1955	Anna Christie	Tower Theatre	Walk on part		
1955	The Archers	Tower Theatre	Walter Gabriel		
1955	Honeymoon Beds	Tower Theatre	P. C. Woodhouse	By Cedric Richards	
1955	Night Was Our Friend	Tower Theatre	Dr. John Harper		
1955	The Martin's Nest	Tower Theatre	Colonel Trevor Bulstrode		
1955	Private Lives	Intimate Theatre	Victor		
1955	See How They Run	Intimate Theatre (Note: A decision was taken to rename the theatre as the Intimate Theatre. The announcement was made to the audience on 28 February 1955 by Neil Gibson, who explained that the change was to avoid confusion as to the professional status of the company: It was felt that the name 'Repertory Theatre' implied an amateur status.)	Corporal Clive Winton		
1955	The Paragon	Intimate Theatre	Aged character cameo		
1955	Separate Rooms	Intimate Theatre	Gary Bryce		
1955	A Little of What You Fancy	Intimate Theatre	Bertie Castleford	The farce was written by Grant	
1955	The Dashing White Sergeant	Intimate Theatre	Robert Cuningham		
1955	Seagulls Over Sorrento	Intimate Theatre	Badger		
1955	East Lynne	Intimate Theatre	Captain William Levison	Grant also directed	
1955	Desire in the Night	Intimate Theatre	Walk on part		
1955	Sabrina Fair	Intimate Theatre	Chauffeur		
1955	For Better, For Worse	Intimate Theatre	Two different furniture men		
1955	Waiting for Gillian	Intimate Theatre	Honourable William Stephen Fitzharding Bule		
1955	Jane Steps Out	Intimate Theatre	Major-General Wilton		
1955	Blind Alley	Intimate Theatre	Walk on part		
1955	MacAdam and Eve	Intimate Theatre	Adam MacAdam		
1955	He Walked In Her Sleep	Intimate Theatre	Sir Andrew Tankerton		
1955	And Then There Were None	Intimate Theatre	Justice Lawrence John Wargrave		
1955	Book o the Month	Intimate Theatre	Colonel Howard Barnes-Bradley		
1955	The Love Match	Intimate Theatre	Bill Brown		
1955	The Secret Tent	Intimate Theatre	Inspector Thornton		
1955	Worm's Eye View	Intimate Theatre	Sam Porter		
1955	Rain	Intimate Theatre	Joe Horn		
1955	Tons of Money	Intimate Theatre	Aubrey Allington	Grant also directed	
1955	Beside the Seaside	Intimate Theatre	Yankee dancer		
1955	Present Laughter	Intimate Theatre	Morris Dixon		
1955	Witness for the Prosecution	Intimate Theatre	Leonard Vole	Two-week run	
1955	Where There's A Will	Intimate Theatre	Alfie Brewer (Turkish bath attendant)		
1955	Rising Heifer	Intimate Theatre		Set design only	
1955	Job For The Boy	Intimate Theatre	Walk on part		
1955	Random Harvest	Intimate Theatre	Lawyer		
1955–1956	Cinderella pantomime	Intimate Theatre	Baron Hardup	Jean Hyett took the title role	
1956	Beauty and the Beast	Intimate Theatre	Merchant		
1956	Simon and Laura	Intimate Theatre	Butler	This was the last play Grant and Hyett performed for the Wycombe Repertory Theatre	

Main theatre stage credits of Grant from 1956
Year	Title	Theatre	Role	Notes	Ref.
1956	The Good Soldier Schweik	Duke of York's Theatre	Bretschneider	Produced by Joan Littlewood and her Theatre Workshop company based at Theatre Royal Stratford East, London	
1956–1957	The Bed	Touring theatre	Leonard Jolijoli	English adaptation of Moumou (or Mou Mou) by Jean de Létraz (Note: The original title was Bed for Beginners. The first dates were at the Norwich Hippodrome in the week commencing 30 July 1956. In some theatres, the play was known as Pajama [sic] Tops.)	
1957	No Time for Sergeants	Her Majesty's Theatre			
1958	Poet and Pheasant	Watford Palace Theatre	Frank Higgins		
1958	Always Friday Night	Watford Palace Theatre	Ben Bailey		
1959	Robinson Crusoe	Watford Palace Theatre	Will Atkins		
1959	Dry Rot	Watford Palace Theatre	Fred Phipps		
1960	Babes in the Wood	Watford Palace Theatre	Will Scarlet		
1960	Pretty as Paint	Touring theatre	Scrubby Willows	The show opened at the Opera House, Leicester, and then toured Exeter, Cardiff and the Watford Palace Theatre, before moving to London	
1960	Ned Kelly	Theatre Royal Stratford East	Pat Quinn	Produced by Joan Littlewood and her Theatre Workshop company	
1960	Every Man in His Humour	Théâtre Sarah‑Bernhardt	Kitely, a Merchant	Directed by Joan Littlewood. World premiere of Littlewood's production at the Fourth International Season of the Theatre of the Nations Festival	
1960	Every Man in His Humour	Theatre Royal Stratford East	Kitely, a Merchant		
1960	Sparrows Can't Sing	Theatre Royal Stratford East	Fred Jug	Directed by Joan Littlewood. Written by Stephen Lewis	
1960	Sparrows Can't Sing	East Berlin	Fred Jug	The company represented England at the 4th East Berlin Festival (Note: The company left London on 2 October 1960 and were scheduled to return on 6 October 1960 in a specially chartered plane. However, they were left stranded at Copenhagen Airport, and the Stratford show on 6 October 1960 had to be cancelled.)	
1960	Lock, Stock and Barrel	Theatre Royal, Newcastle	Lolly Larkin		
1960	Charley's Aunt	Oxford Playhouse	Lord Fancourt Babberley (impersonating the aunt)	Many considered Grant's rendition of the Lord Babberley role to be the best	
1961	Sparrows Can't Sing	Wyndham's Theatre	Fred Jug	Transferred from Theatre Royal Stratford East	
1961	Big Soft Nellie	Oxford Playhouse	Mr. Twigg	Three night run before transferring to the Theatre Royal Stratford East	
1961	Big Soft Nellie	Theatre Royal Stratford East	Mr. Twigg		
1962	Blitz!	Regal, Edmonton	Alfred ("Alfie") Locke	It opened at Edmonton before transferring to the Adelphi	
1962–1963	Blitz!	Adelphi Theatre	Alfred ("Alfie") Locke		
1964	Don't Ask Me, Ask Dad	State, Kilburn	George Eastwood	Book and lyrics by Grant. The original title was The Kitty and then changed to Don't Ask Me, Ask Dad, the title of one of the songs in the show. The name was changed again to Instant Marriage when it moved to the Piccadilly	
1964–1965	Instant Marriage	Piccadilly Theatre	George Eastwood	Directed by Grant	
1965	Twang!!	Palace Theatre, Manchester	Sheriff of Nottingham	A Birmingham opening on 21 October 1965 was scheduled and cancelled. The Manchester preview opened on 3 November 1965 at the Palace Theatre with a script that was unfinished	
1965–1966	Twang!!	Shaftesbury Theatre	Sheriff of Nottingham		
1967	MacBird!	Theatre Royal Stratford East	Macbird (Lyndon B. Johnson)	Directed by Joan Littlewood (Note: Macbird was refused a licence by the Lord Chamberlain on the grounds that it made fun of the head of state of a friendly power. It was presented at the Theatre Royal by the Theatre Royal Club, and only members of the club, or affiliated clubs, were able to buy seats.)	
1967	Hold on Hortense	Theatre Royal Stratford East	Bob Grant and his clowns	A second performance was played on 29 May 1967	
1967	Intrigues and Amours	Theatre Royal Stratford East	Constant		
1967	Mrs. Wilson's Diary	Theatre Royal Stratford East	George Brown and the 1st Removal Man		
1967–1968	Mrs. Wilson's Diary	Criterion Theatre	George Brown (Note: After George Brown's resignation from the Government on 15 March 1968, the character of George Brown was switched with Barbara Castle, as the plot required a Cabinet Minister.) and the 1st Removal Man	The play was transferred to the Criterion Theatre after breaking all box office records at the Theatre Royal, Stratford	
1968	Charlie Came To Our Town	Harrogate Grand Opera House	Caretaker	Alan Plater wrote the musical specifically for the Harrogate Festival of Arts and Sciences (Note: In 1965, Alan Plater wrote a play for television called In The Nutter, about an anarchist who persuaded a northern town's dignitaries to paint the whole town white for an anniversary. Plater then expanded it into a light-hearted musical for the Harrogate Festival under the title Charlie Came to Our Town.)	
1968	The Houses by the Green	Royal Court Theatre	Mervyn Molyneaux (old Jewish stockbroker)		
1968	The Tutor	Royal Court Theatre	Pastor		
1968–1969	Cinderella pantomime	New Theatre, Bromley			
1969–1971	Pyjama Tops	Whitehall Theatre	Leonard Jolly	This was another English adaptation of Moumou (or Mou Mou) by Jean de Létraz	
1972	The Londoners	Theatre Royal Stratford East	Sid	Musical based on Sparrers Can't Sing	
1972	Stop It, Nurse!	Windmill Theatre, Great Yarmouth	Felix (the motorcyclist and eventual patient)		
1973	Busman's Holiday	Pavilion Theatre, Torquay	Willie Beattie	Production of the play Busman's Holiday by Sam Cree	
1973	No Sex Please, We're British	Minerva Theatre, Sydney (Australia)	Brian Runnicles	Grant took the lead for a month from 22 November 1973 (Note: Jonathan Daly, the original lead in Melbourne, walked out on the production a few weeks after its opening and flew back to America. The Australian understudy, Allan Kingsford‑Smith, took over the role but box office takings dipped.)	
1974	No Sex Please, We're British	The Playhouse, Weston-super-Mare	Brian Runnicles		
1974	Package Honeymoon	Devonshire Park Theatre	Jack	Written by Grant. It also starred Anna Karen	
1974–1975	Cinderella pantomime	Princes Hall			
1975	Darling Mr. London (Note: In 1996, staged as Continental Call Girls at the St. Andrew's Lane Theatre, Dublin.)	Grand Theatre, Wolverhampton	Curate Mark Thompson	Written by Grant and Anthony Marriott. David Jason took the lead role of Edward Hawkins	
1975	One for the Pot	Touring theatre	Charlie Barnet	Opened at the Wyvern Theatre, Swindon, on 18 August 1975, and toured for ten weeks	
1975–1976	Jack and the Beanstalk	Lewisham Concert Hall	Muddles	Stephen Lewis was cast as the King	
1976	Pyjama Tops	Touring theatre	Leonard Jolly	This was another English adaptation of Moumou (or Mou Mou) by Jean de Létraz. The play opened at the Grand Theatre, Wolverhampton on 2 March 1976 and toured provincial theatres for twenty weeks	
1976–1977	Dick Whittington	Cliffs Pavilion	Idle Jack		
1977	The Taming of the Shrew	Touring theatre	Two roles: In the induction, Christopher Sly, a tinker. In the play, Vincentio of Pisa, father of Lucentio	Starred Wendy Craig. The tour started at the Forum, Billingham on 14 February 1966, and continued until the end of April at Wilmslow, Peterborough, Richmond, Brighton, Leeds, Oxford, Norwich, Bath and Cardiff	
1977	The Wizard of Oz	New Theatre, Cardiff		The show ran from 29 June to 23 July 1977	
1977	Pygmalion	Birmingham Repertory Theatre	Alfred Doolittle		
1977–1978	A Christmas Carol	Birmingham Repertory Theatre	Ebenezer Scrooge		
1978	No Sex Please, We're British	Regal Theatre, Perth, Western Australia	Brian Runnicles		
1978	Two and Two Make Sex	Shanklin Theatre	George Williams, a property dealer	Two-play repertory with Shock. The two-in-one set was designed by Kenneth Turner. Directed by Grant and ran until 30 September 1978	
1978	Shock	Shanklin Theatre	Terry Dexter, an airline pilot	By Brian Clemens. Directed by John Newman	
1978	Kiss Me, Kate	Birmingham Repertory Theatre	Debt collector	The show ran from 10 November to 9 December 1978	
1978–1979	Robinson Crusoe	Churchill Theatre	Mrs Crusoe		
1979	Tommy	Queens Theatre, Shaftesbury Avenue	Uncle Ernie	Transferred from Queen's Theatre, Hornchurch	
1979	Doctor in the House	Weymouth Pavilion	Bromley, hospital porter		
1979–1980	Jack and the Beanstalk	Ashcroft Theatre			
1980	The Miracle Shirker	Queen's Theatre, Hornchurch		Written by Wally K. Daly	
1980	Come Play With Me	Touring theatre		It was scheduled to play theatres from March to July 1980. However, the run was cancelled at the end of May because the production company, Bob Holmes Management, had got into "financial difficulties" (Note: The farce Love's A Luxury was scheduled originally to play theatres, but the author, Edward Hoile, objected to the proposed nude scenes.)	
1980	Line 'Em	Cottesloe Theatre (now the Dorfman Theatre) at the Royal National Theatre	Chaser		
1980–1981	Oh! Calcutta!	Touring theatre	Writer, compère, and one part as an ageing husband	National tour that opened at the Theatre Royal, Bath on 22 September 1980	
1981	Oh! Calcutta!	Touring theatre	Writer, compère, and one part as an ageing husband	Nationwide New Zealand tour	
1981–1982	Cinderella pantomime	Birmingham Repertory Theatre	Ugly sister		
1982	Anyone For Denis?	Touring theatre	Denis Thatcher	The opening night was at York Theatre Royal. The play was taken to 24 different theatres	
1982–1983	Cinderella pantomime	The Alexandra, Birmingham	Ugly sister		
1983	Comic Cuts	Queen's Theatre, Hornchurch	Byron Greenswood		
1983	Keeping Down With the Joneses	Richmond Theatre	Raymond Blake	The tour continued at The Hexagon from 20 September 1983, then went to the Yvonne Arnaud Theatre for four weeks from 26 September 1983	
1983–1984	Toad of Toad Hall	Birmingham Repertory Theatre	Ratty		
1984	Pyjama Tops	Pier Theatre, Bournemouth	Leonard Jolly	Grant also directed	
1984	Pyjama Tops	Weymouth Pavilion	Leonard Jolly	Grant also directed	
1984–1985	Treasure Island	Birmingham Repertory Theatre	Ben Gunn		
1985	Anyone For Denis?	Touring theatre	Denis Thatcher	The production opened in June at the Bournemouth Playhouse and moved on to Richmond, Wolverhampton, Peterborough, Birmingham, Manchester and other major cities	
1985–1986	Cinderella pantomime	De Montfort Hall	Ugly sister (Krystle)		
1986	The Winter's Tale	Birmingham Repertory Theatre	Autolycus		
1986–1987	Cinderella pantomime	Harlequin Theatre, Redhill	Ugly sister		
1987	Rising Damp	Hyatt Regency Hotel, Singapore	Rupert Rigsby	Adapted from The Banana Box by Eric Chappell. Café Theatre Company tour of Central and South East Asia (Note: The Café Theatre Company was established by Derek Woodward and presented popular theatrical productions featuring established British television actors in a dinner theatre setting in international hotel ballroom venues.)	
1987–1988	Jack and the Beanstalk	Palmers Green Theatre	Simple Simon		
1988–1989	Guys and Dolls	Leicester Haymarket Theatre	Arvide Abernathy		
1990	Hands Off My Crumpet	Touring theatre	Godfrey Croker, the managing director of a crumpet factory	The tour opened at Doncaster Civic Theatre on 15 January 1990 (Note: The production company went into liquidation in early February, and the tour was cancelled after only three shows.)	
1990	Private Lives	International Hotel, Kuwait		Café Theatre Company tour of the Middle East. The group toured Abu Dhabi, Dubai and Muscat. Sponsored by Cathay Pacific	
1990	Arsenic and Old Lace	Pitlochry Festival Theatre	Mr. Gibbs (lodger)	Opened on 4 May 1990. Grant was in five of the six plays scheduled for the festival	
1990	Sailor Beware!	Pitlochry Festival Theatre			
1990	Separate Tables	Pitlochry Festival Theatre			
1990	The Little Foxes	Pitlochry Festival Theatre	Oscar Hubbard		
1990	The Cherry Orchard	Pitlochry Festival Theatre	Roger Kemp		
1990–1991	Seven Brides For Seven Brothers	Leicester Haymarket Theatre		Opened on 16 November 1990	
1991	When Did You Last See Your Trousers?	Leicester Haymarket Theatre			
1991	Piaf	Perth Theatre	Louis Leplée (Piaf's manager)	The show ran for three weeks	
1991	Celebrity Concert	Perth Theatre	Himself	Fund raising concert for Peace Child International	
1991–1992	Jack and the Beanstalk	Perth Theatre	Squire Skinflint		
1992	A Month of Sundays	Pitlochry Festival Theatre	Michael Aylott (rest home resident)		
1992	Spider's Web	Pitlochry Festival Theatre			
1992	Death of a Salesman	Pitlochry Festival Theatre	Ben Loman		
1993	A Flea In Her Ear	Pitlochry Festival Theatre	Chandebise and Poche		
1993	Beyond Reasonable Doubt	Pitlochry Festival Theatre	Mr. Justice Treadwell (judge)		
1993	You Never Can Tell	Pitlochry Festival Theatre	Walter (the waiter)		
1993	La Vie de Bohème	Pitlochry Festival Theatre	In repertory		
1994	Murder at the Vicarage	Pitlochry Festival Theatre	Police Inspector		
1994	Hobson's Choice	Pitlochry Festival Theatre	Hobson employee		
1994	The Will	Pitlochry Festival Theatre	Mr. Devizes Senior (solicitor)	One of a quartet of short plays by J. M. Barrie that the company performed. The production was supported by the Post Office	
1995	Hobson's Choice	Chichester Festival Theatre	Jim Heeler	The play finished at Chichester on 21 July 1995	
1995	Hobson's Choice	Touring theatre	Jim Heeler	The tour started in Guildford and finished in the Theatre Royal, Bath, at the beginning of October 1995, before heading to the Lyric Theatre	
1995–1996	Hobson's Choice	Lyric Theatre, London	Jim Heeler	It starred Leo McKern and Nichola McAuliffe	
1997	Breaking the Code	Pitlochry Festival Theatre	Dillwyn Knox		
1997	The Sunshine Boys	Pitlochry Festival Theatre	Al Lewis		
1998	Murder Is Easy	Devonshire Park Theatre	Luke Fitzwilliam	Summer drama season. He starred alongside Margaret Ashcroft	
1998	Funny Money	Devonshire Park Theatre	Henry Perkins (accountant)	Last stage role	

=== As director ===
This table contains Grant's stage work as a director. It does not include those productions in which he also appeared, which are shown in the table above.

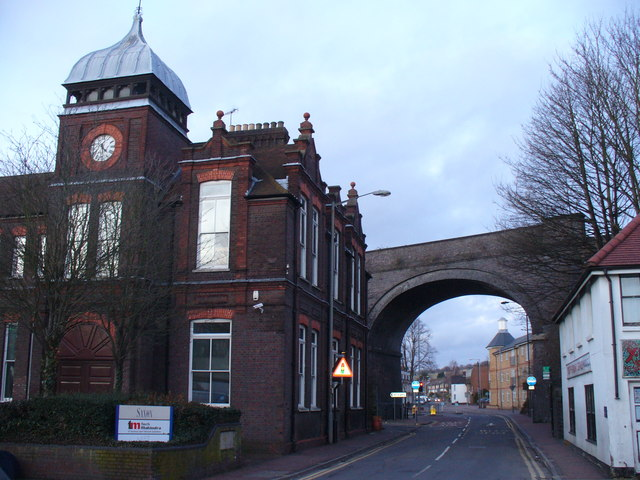
Former Wycombe Repertory Theatre

Director credits of Grant
Year	Title	Theatre	Notes	Ref.
1955	A Question of Fact	Tower Theatre		
1955	As Long as They're Happy	Intimate Theatre		
1955	The Seven Year Itch	Intimate Theatre		
1955	Down Came a Blackbird	Intimate Theatre		
1955	The Moon Is Blue	Intimate Theatre		
1967	The Marie Lloyd Story	Theatre Royal Stratford East	Assistant Director	

== Radio plays ==
Grant took part in many radio broadcasts in his career, including interviews, poetry readings and talks about the theatre and acting. The following is a list of plays in which he was involved.

Radio plays of Grant
Year^{[a]}	Title	Episode	Station	Role	Notes
1959	Thirty-Minute Theatre	I Bought a Jalopy	BBC Light Programme	Car owner	
1959	Dombey and Son		BBC Home Service	Mr. Toots	Adapted for radio in eight parts by Hilary Oldfield Box
1960	Thirty-Minute Theatre	The Man Who Changed His Name	BBC Light Programme		The last of six plays by members of the Crime Writers' Association
1960	The Saturday Matinee	A Feather in His Cap	BBC Home Service	Sergeant Smithers	By Joan Morgan
1961	No Bother		BBC Home Service		Written and read by Grant
1963	Lord Halewyn		BBC Third Programme	Griffons, one of Halewyn's men	By Michel de Ghelderode. Fourteen scenes/episodes were broadcast
1963	For The Young Joanna Turpentine	The Rocket Witch	BBC Home Service		A dialogue story by Michael Mason
1963	For The Young Joanna Turpentine	The Beefeateria Motel	BBC Home Service		
1963	For The Young Joanna Turpentine	The Great Bullion Robbery	BBC Home Service		
1963	Platonov		BBC Third Programme	Abram Vengerovich	
1964	The Day Dumbfounded Got His Pylon		BBC Third Programme	Im	By Henry Livings
1965	Abu Hassan		BBC Third Programme	Masrur	At the time, Grant was directing and appearing in Instant Marriage at the Piccadilly Theatre
1965	The Sponge Room		BBC Home Service	Edwards	By Keith Waterhouse and Willis Hall
1966	Midday Story	A Harbour of Refuge	BBC Home Service	Read by Grant	By W. W. Jacobs
1966	A Man Like That		BBC Third Programme	William	By Stanley Eveling
1966	Saturday Night Theatre	The Cure for Love	BBC Home Service	Harry Lancaster	By Walter Greenwood
1967	Saturday Night Theatre	Eden End	BBC Home Service	Charles Appleby	Theatre in the Round Company, Scarborough
1967	Afternoon Theatre	The Frosty-Fresh Man	BBC Radio 4	Multiple parts: Atkins, Buster's Porridge, and Williams	Written by Grant
1968	The 17-Jewelled Shockproof Swiss-Made Bomb	F8 and Then Infinity	BBC Radio 2	The Major	Episode 1. A serial in six parts by Roy Clarke
1968	The 17-Jewelled Shockproof Swiss-Made Bomb	Light the Blue Touch Paper and Retire	BBC Radio 2	The Major	Episode 2
1968	The 17-Jewelled Shockproof Swiss-Made Bomb	The Minestrone Thickens and is Stirred	BBC Radio 2	The Major	Episode 3
1968	The 17-Jewelled Shockproof Swiss-Made Bomb	Saraband to a Burning Fuse	BBC Radio 2	The Major	Episode 4
1968	The 17-Jewelled Shockproof Swiss-Made Bomb	Smaller Shrinks the Standing Corn	BBC Radio 2	The Major	Episode 5
1968	The 17-Jewelled Shockproof Swiss-Made Bomb	Don't Go Near The Water	BBC Radio 2	The Major	Episode 6
1968	Big Soft Nellie		BBC Radio 3	Mr. Twigg	By Henry Livings with Bryan Pringle
1968	The Events at Black Tor	Such as Sit in Darkness	BBC Radio 2	Father Michael Probert	Episode 1. A serial in six parts by Roy Clarke. Produced by Alan Ayckbourn
1968	The Events at Black Tor	The Unquiet Dead	BBC Radio 2	Father Michael Probert	Episode 2
1968	The Events at Black Tor	The Fires of Hell	BBC Radio 2	Father Michael Probert	Episode 3
1968	The Events at Black Tor	The Hounds of Hell	BBC Radio 2	Father Michael Probert	Episode 4
1968	The Events at Black Tor	The Things that Emerge with the Dark	BBC Radio 2	Father Michael Probert	Episode 5
1968	The Events at Black Tor	The Deepest Dark	BBC Radio 2	Father Michael Probert	Episode 6
1968	Sunday Play	The Frosty-Fresh Man	2CN (Australia)	Multiple parts: Atkins, Buster's Porridge, and Williams	Sold to both Australian and New Zealand radio stations
1968	Saturday Night Theatre	Protection	BBC Radio 4	Divisional Superintendent Collins	
1968	The Northern Drift		BBC Radio 3	Himself	A selection of prose, poems, and songs from the North of England
1968	Afternoon Theatre	The World of Miss Edwina Finch's Cat	BBC Radio 4	Charlie	Written by Roy Clarke
1969	The Prisoner		BBC Radio 3	Potter	Produced by Alan Ayckbourn
1970	Three from the North	A Bang with a Spanner	BBC Radio 4	John	Episode two. Written by Derek Walker
1970	Five from the North	A 'Napple and a 'Norange	BBC Radio 4		Episode five. Written by Albert Rhodes
1972	The Monday Play	The Prisoner	BBC Radio 4	Potter	Included in a book of six plays called We All Come to It in the End by Don Haworth
1974	Thirty-Minute Theatre	Love in Triplicate	BBC Radio 4	Stephen Watson	
1977	Saturday Night Theatre	Pen-Friends	BBC Radio 4	Bill	Written by Ken Whitmore
1977	Morning Story	The Bored Housewife of Bradford	BBC Radio 4	Narrated by Grant	Written and read by Grant
1978	Afternoon Theatre	Ahead of the Game	BBC Radio 4	George	Written by Allen Saddler
1979	Just Before Midnight		BBC Radio 4	Master	A mime for radio by Henry Livings
1979	My Delight		BBC Radio 4	Himself	Grant describes one of the pleasures of life
1979	Story Time	A Rogue's Life	BBC Radio 4	Narrated by Grant	Written by Wilkie Collins and abridged in ten parts by Elizabeth Bradbury
1979	Thirty-Minute Theatre	The Hitch	BBC Radio 4	Bob Foxton	
1980	Urn		BBC Radio 4	Harold	Written by Henry Livings and Bernard Cribbins
1980	The Monday Play	The Adventures of the Ingenious Gentleman Don Quixote de la Mancha	BBC Radio 4	Don Quixote	Adapted for radio in two parts by John Arden. Bernard Cribbins played the role of Sancho Panza
1980	Hordes of the Things	Chronicle Four	BBC Radio 4	HobLob, the Monstrous Spider	
1980	Carol in the Advent Calendar		BBC Radio 4	Mr. Gorblestone and Old Father Time	Written by Ken Whitmore
1982	Thirty-Minute Theatre	The Great Times Crossword Conspiracy	BBC Radio 4	Contrabine	Written by Ken Whitmore
1983	Thirty-Minute Theatre	Metamorphosid Arkwright	BBC Radio 4	Sid Arkwright	Written by John Turner and Ian McMillan
1984	Afternoon Theatre	The Artillery Terrace Hot Five Stomp Again	BBC Radio 4	Grandad	Written by David Luck
1985	The Afternoon Play	Hoodlums	BBC Radio 4	Max	Written by Peter Whalley
1986	The Afternoon Play	The Red Telephone Box	BBC Radio 4	Chief Inspector Cockfoster	Written by Ken Whitmore
1986	The Afternoon Play	Down to Earth	BBC Radio 4	Cyril	Written by Neil Shenton

== Recordings ==
- Blitz!, London: EMI Records, 1962, OCLC 18093861
- Instant Marriage: Original London cast recording, London: Oriole Records, 1964, OCLC 1057793325
- Twang!!: Original cast recording, London: United Artists, 1966, OCLC 53462567
- Mrs. Wilson's Diary: Original cast recorded live on 14 October 1967 at the Theatre Royal, Stratford, London: Parlophone, 1968, OCLC 56992600
- Line 'Em: Original cast, London: Royal National Theatre, 4 September 1980, OCLC 1205420719, "Recorded live on 4 September 1980 at the National Theatre (Cottesloe), London."

== Film ==
Film credits of Grant
Year	Title	Role	Notes	Ref.
1959	I'm All Right Jack	Card player	Uncredited: Four workers playing cards behind the pallets. Grant is on the left and nearest the camera. The other three card players were played by David Lodge, Keith Smith, and Kenneth J. Warren	
1960	The Criminal	Prisoner	Uncredited	
1963	Sparrows Can't Sing	Perce		
1965	Help!	Cameo	Grant's scenes were cut from the film	
1969	Till Death Us Do Part	Man in Pub		
1971	On the Buses	Jack Harper		
1972	Mutiny on the Buses	Jack Harper		
1973	Holiday on the Buses	Jack Harper		

== Television ==
The following is a list of television programmes in which Grant was involved.

Television appearances of Grant
Year	Title	Episode	Station	Role	Notes	Ref.
1959	Quatermass and the Pit	The Wild Hunt	BBC One	Ted (Electrical technician — uncredited)	Series 1, Episode 5	
1959	Quatermass and the Pit	Hob	BBC One	Ted (Electrical technician — uncredited)	Series 1, Episode 6. He was electrocuted while laying a power cable inside the chamber	
1961	Sir Francis Drake	The Doughty Plot	Independent Television	Clements		
1963	No Hiding Place	Solomon Dancey's Luck	Independent Television	Alexander Mudgeon		
1964	Armchair Theatre	A Jug of Bread	Independent Television	Ben		
1964	The Plane Makers	Appointment in Brussels	Independent Television	Antique Dealer	Series 3, Episode 11	
1965	Merry-Go-Round	The Incredible Adventures of Professor Branestawm	BBC One	Professor Branestawm	Broadcast as part of the Merry-Go-Round children's education series	^{[a]}
1967	Softly, Softly	James McNeil, Aged 23	BBC One	Napier	Series 2, Episode 12	^{[a]}
1968	Z-Cars	Punch-Up: Part 1	BBC One	Ted Griffin	Series 6, Episode 157	^{[a]}
1968	Z-Cars	Punch-Up: Part 2	BBC One	Ted Griffin	Series 6, Episode 158	^{[a]}
1969	Mrs. Wilson's Diary		Independent Television	George Brown	It was scheduled originally to be broadcast on 23 November 1968 (Note: The Independent Television Authority (ITA) objected to certain scenes that characterised George Brown, the former Foreign Secretary, as a drunk. London Weekend Television refused to make the cuts requested by the ITA, but eventually backed down, and the scenes were reshot.)	
1969–1973	On the Buses		Independent Television	Jack Harper	Grant appeared in all 74 episodes and as a writer with Stephen Lewis for a number of episodes from series 5 onwards	
1969	All Star Comedy Carnival		Independent Television	Jack Harper		
1970	Comedy Playhouse	The Jugg Brothers	BBC One	Robert Jugg	Written by Grant and Stephen Lewis. Comedy pilot for Series 9 of the Comedy Playhouse	^{[a]}
1970	The Borderers	The Quacksalver	BBC Two	William Peck	Series 2, Episode 7	^{[a]}
1970	This Is Your Life	Reg Varney	Independent Television	Himself	Series 10, Episode 25	
1971	This Is Your Life	Doris Hare	Independent Television	Himself	Series 12, Episode 7	
1972	All Star Comedy Carnival		Independent Television	Jack Harper	The On the Buses segment was written by Grant and Stephen Lewis	
1973	Mike and Bernie Go West		Westward Television	Himself	One-off chat show hosted by Mike and Bernie Winters. Anna Karen was also interviewed.	
1975	It's a Celebrity Knockout	Craven Cottage	BBC One	Himself		^{[a]}
1975	Comedy Premiere	Milk-o	Independent Television	Jim Wilkins	Written by Grant and Anthony Marriott	
1976	It's a Celebrity Knockout	Selhurst Park	BBC One	Himself		^{[a]}
1977	It's a Celebrity Knockout	Stamford Bridge	BBC One	Himself		^{[a]}
1978	It's a Celebrity Knockout	Craven Cottage	BBC One	Himself		^{[a]}
1979	It's a Celebrity Knockout	Loftus Road	BBC One	Himself		^{[a]}
1980	It's a Celebrity Knockout	Craven Cottage	BBC One	Himself		^{[a]}
1981	Grampian Television News	Interview	Grampian Television	Himself	Grant is interviewed on his role in Oh! Calcutta!	
1982	Central News	Interview	Central Television	Himself	Geoff Meade at the New Theatre Oxford, where the satire play, Anyone for Denis, was performed. Grant is interviewed	
1985	Central News	Interview	Central Television	Himself	Bharat Patel interview with Grant	
1987	Central News	Interview	Central Television	Himself	Interview with Grant at East Midlands Airport where he had just arrived from Dublin. He said that "he had had little work recently and needed to be alone to sort out his life."	
1987	The Pamela Armstrong Show	Interview	BBC Two	Himself	Interview with Pamela Armstrong	
1987	Daytime	The price of fame: in and out of the public eye	ITV	Himself	Discussion show with Sarah Kennedy	
1990	Wogan	Interview	BBC One	Himself	Interview with the former cast of On the Buses about plans to revive the series as Back on the Buses	

== Awards and honours ==
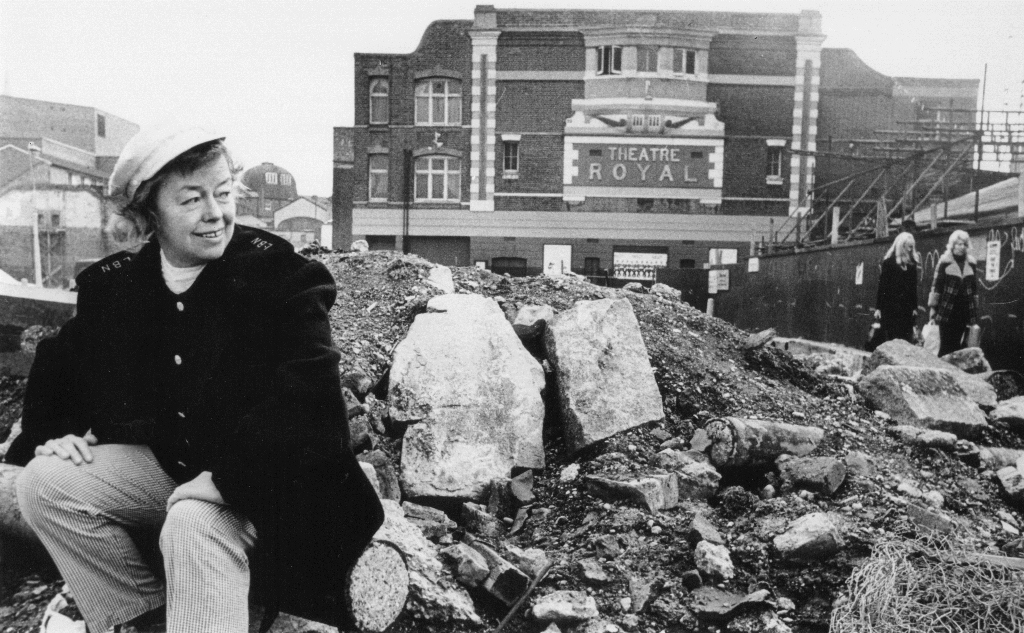
Joan Littlewood directed Grant, as Kitely, in Every Man in His Humour, at the Fourth International Season of the Theatre of the Nations Festival. In the 1990s, Grant became well-known to Pitlochry Festival Theatre audiences with many stage appearances.

Awards and honours presented to Grant
Year	Film or Production	Award	Category	Result	Ref.
1960	Every Man in His Humour	Fourth International Season of the Theatre of the Nations Festival — Young Critics Circle	Best Supporting Performance	Won (Note: Shared with Cyril Cusack.)	

== Publications ==
- Marriott, Anthony; — (1978). Darling Mr. London: a farce. London: Samuel French. ISBN 978-0-573-11113-6. OCLC 1038431648.
- Marriott, Anthony; — (1978). No room for love: a farce. London: Samuel French. ISBN 978-0-573-11310-9. OCLC 5379828.
- Marriott, Anthony; — (1991). Home is where your clothes are: a comedy in two acts. London: Samuel French. ISBN 978-0-573-01789-6. OCLC 26310819.

== See also ==
- Joan Littlewood
- On the Buses
- Pitlochry Festival Theatre
- Theatre Workshop

== Bibliography ==
=== Books and journals ===
- Atwell, David (1980). Cathedrals of the movies: a history of British cinemas and their audiences. London: Architectural Press. ISBN 978-0-85139-562-3. OCLC 905456943.
- Barrie, James Matthew (1914). Half hours. New York: C. Scribner's sons. OCLC 1031801065.
- Bingham, John; Gunn, Barbara (1957). Acting for You. London: The Lutterworth Press. OCLC 774622944.
- Chapman, John; Lloyd, Jeremy (1985). Keeping down with the Joneses: A comedy. New York: Samuel French, Inc. ISBN 978-0-573-61115-5. OCLC 12175177.
- Goorney, Howard (1981). The Theatre Workshop story. London: Eyre Methuen. ISBN 978-0-413-47610-4. OCLC 255545640.
- Herbert, Ian (1977). Who's who in the theatre: a biographical record of the contemporary stage (16th ed.). London: Pitman. pp. 668–669. ISBN 978-0-273001-63-8. OCLC 1036916139.
- Jackson, Peter, ed. (20 December 1969). "6.0 All Star Comedy Carnival 8.30" (JPEG). TVTimes. London: Independent Television Publications. ISSN 0962-1660. Archived from the original on 22 March 2020. "Christmas 1969 & New Year Double Issue. Des O'Connor in Santa hat and beard, cover design by John Farman"
- Lemmon, David, ed. (1989). British Theatre Yearbook. New York: St. Martin's Press. ISBN 978-0-312031-98-5. OCLC 20701207.
- Stewart, John (2006). Broadway musicals, 1943 to 2004. Jefferson: McFarland & Company. ISBN 978-0-7864-2244-9. OCLC 61362150.
- Walker, John, ed. (2003). Halliwell's Film Guide 2004 (19th ed.). New York: HarperResource. ISBN 978-0-007167-12-8. OCLC 1052808936.
- White, Leonard (2003). Armchair Theatre: The Lost Years. Tiverton: Kelly Publications. ISBN 978-1-903053-18-8. OCLC 53030738.

=== Theatre programmes ===
- Chichester Festival Theatre. "Hobson's Choice" (3 May 1995) [Programme]. Mike Simmons Programme Collection, Series: Programmes, ID: SIM/PG/888 (Microfilm Reference X024/088). Bristol: University of Bristol Theatre Collection. Retrieved 26 May 2021.
- Forum Theatre (14 February 1977). The Taming of the Shrew, Forum Theatre, Billingham, Cleveland (PDF) (Programme). Stockton-on-Tees: Heritage Stockton, Stockton Central Library. p. 6. 1645. Archived (PDF) from the original on 10 July 2020.
- "Mark Furness & Bruce Warwick present Bob Grant in 'Oh! Calcutta!' Nationwide New Zealand tour 1981. Souvenir issue" (1981) [Programme]. Theatre programmes for variety, comedy, and music hall shows and performances toured throughout New Zealand, Series: Theatre Programmes, ID: Eph-B-VARIETY-1981. Wellington: Alexander Turnbull Library, National Library of New Zealand. Retrieved 26 May 2021.
- Leicester Haymarket. "Seven Brides for Seven Brothers" (1990) [Programme]. Local Studies Ephemera, Series: 115 to 792 Theatre, ID: 792 Ephemera. Leicester: Record Office for Leicestershire. Retrieved 26 May 2021.
- Lyric Theatre. "Hobson's Choice" (1995) [Programme]. Mander & Mitchenson Collection, Series: Lyric Theatre, Shaftesbury Avenue, London, ID: MM/2/TH/LO/LYR/61. Bristol: University of Bristol Theatre Collection. Retrieved 26 May 2021.
- Pavilion Theatre (1973). Busman's Holiday Programme (Programme). Torquay: Stilwell Darby & Co.
- Regal Theatre (30 March 1978). "No Sex, Please, We're British. Comedy". www.mopa.ptt.wa.gov.au. Perth: Museum of Performing Arts His Majesty's Theatre. PRG-443. Archived from the original on 27 November 2020.
- Chronological Table of Productions at the Theatre Royal (PDF) (Report). Stratford East: Theatre Royal Stratford East. 2012. p. 67. Archived (PDF) from the original on 14 March 2021.
- Theatre Royal. "Hobson's Choice" (2 October 1995) [Programme]. Theatre Collection, Series: Programmes, ID: PR/2137. Bristol: University of Bristol Theatre Collection. Retrieved 26 May 2021.
- Whitehall Theatre (1969). Pyjama Tops Programme (Programme). London: Paul Raymond Organisation.
- Williams, Nigel. "Line 'Em. A new play by Nigel Williams: Programme with rehearsal photographs" (18 August 1980) [Programme]. Royal National Theatre, Series: Cottesloe Programmes, ID: RNT/PP/1/4/41. London: National Theatre Archive, Royal National Theatre. Retrieved 26 May 2021.

=== Websites ===
- "All Star Comedy Carnival". www.bfi.org.uk. London: British Film Institute. 1972. Archived from the original on 15 October 2023.
- "Pamela Armstrong. Season 1". www.radiotimes.com. London: Immediate Media Company. 28 January 1987. Archived from the original on 5 February 2022.
- "All On the Buses Episodes 1969 to 1973". www.comedy.co.uk. London: British Comedy Guide. 1969. Archived from the original on 22 March 2020.
- Cater, Martin (28 February 2019). "On the Buses at 50". networkonair.com. London: Network Distributing Limited. Archived from the original on 31 July 2019.
- Clark, John Stephen (7 December 2019). "Theatre Heritage Australia — Minerva Theatre, Sydney (Part 3)". www.theatreheritage.org.au. Sydney: Theatre Heritage Australia. Archived from the original on 22 March 2020.
- Dobermann, Harry (29 December 1964). "Appointment in Brussels Writer John Gray Director Peter Collinson". wymark.org.uk. Archived from the original on 22 March 2020.
- Dobermann, Harry (1968). "Till Death us do Part". dobermann.wymark.org.uk. Hovedstaden. Archived from the original on 22 March 2020.
- "The Doughty Plot". www.bfi.org.uk. London: British Film Institute. 1961. Archived from the original on 15 October 2023.
- Harris, Roland B. (October 2004). Sussex Extensive Urban Survey (EUS). Horsham Historic Character Assessment Report (PDF). www.westsussex.gov.uk (Report). Chichester: West Sussex County Council. p. 21. Archived (PDF) from the original on 10 July 2020.
- Inner Circle (17 December 2017). "Inner Circle: Alumini Interview: Derek Woodward". issuu.com. London: Regent's University London. pp. 28–29. Archived from the original on 10 July 2020 – via Issuu. "For alumni and friends of Regent's University London."
- "Welcome to the New Theatre Online Archive". www.newtheatrecardiff.co.uk. Cardiff: New Theatre Cardiff. 1977. Archived from the original on 21 November 2018.
- "This Is Your Life Season 10. Episode 25: Reg Varney". www.radiotimes.com. London: Immediate Media Company. 20 May 1970. Archived from the original on 3 December 2022.
- "Solomon Dancey's Luck". www.bfi.org.uk. London: British Film Institute. 1963. Archived from the original on 15 October 2023.
- "Sparrows Can't Sing". www.bfi.org.uk. London: British Film Institute. 1963. Archived from the original on 15 October 2023.

=== Media ===
- Grant, Bob (19 January 1959). Quatermass and the Pit — The Wild Hunt (Television). London: BBC. Event occurs at 31 minutes 16 seconds. Archived from the original on 22 March 2020. "Come on Ted"
- Grant, Bob (26 January 1959). Quatermass and the Pit — Hob (Television). London: BBC. Event occurs at 2 minutes 12 seconds. Archived from the original on 10 March 2020. "Has been electrocuted"
- Grant, Bob (1959). I'm All Right Jack (Motion picture trailer). Paris: StudioCanal. Event occurs at 41 seconds. "You berk"
- Grant, Bob (1960). The Criminal (Motion picture trailer). Paris: StudioCanal. Event occurs at 1 minute 56 seconds.
- Doris Hare (29 December 1971). This Is Your Life (Television). Leeds: Independent Television. Event occurs at 2 minutes 59 seconds. Archived from the original on 10 August 2017 – via ITV Archive. "Bob Grant"
- Grant, Bob (1 March 1981). Oh Calcutta — Bob Grant (Digital) (Television). Glasgow: Grampian Television. Event occurs at 24 minutes 18 seconds. 10674. Archived from the original on 10 July 2020 – via Moving Image Archive. "Grampian Television News Tape L0070"
- Grant, Bob (12 May 1982). Central News: Play — Anyone for Denis (16mm) (Television). Lincoln: Central Television. Duration 2 minutes 4 seconds. Archived from the original on 21 March 2020 – via Media Archive for Central England. "Geoff Meade at the Apollo Theatre, Oxford, where the satire play, Anyone for Denis, is being performed. Interview with Bob Grant who plays Denis Thatcher"
- Grant, Bob (23 December 1985). Central News East: Sheep and Music (Betacam SP) (Television). Lincoln: Central Television. Duration 1 minute 46 seconds. Archived from the original on 21 March 2020 – via Media Archive for Central England. "Bharat Patel interview with Bob Grant (Ugly sister)"
- Grant, Bob (27 January 1987). Central News East: Bob Grant (Betacam SP) (Television). Lincoln: Central Television. Duration 1 minute 37 seconds. Archived from the original on 21 March 2020 – via Media Archive for Central England. "Niall Brown reports that the actor Bob Grant has returned after going missing for five days"

=== Newspapers ===
==== Aberdeen Evening Express ====
- "Now Bob reviews the bare facts". Aberdeen Evening Express. 30 March 1981. p. 7. OCLC 751636405 – via British Newspaper Archive.

==== Arab Times ====
- "Private Lives: The best light comedy to come out of England". Arab Times. Kuwait. 21 March 1990. p. 15. OCLC 7442756.

==== Birmingham Daily Gazette ====
- S., S. (7 August 1956). "Aston Hippodrome. Private? Not Their Lives". Birmingham Daily Gazette. p. 5. OCLC 17643638 – via British Newspaper Archive.

==== Birmingham Daily Post ====
- Middleham, Edgar (12 October 1965). "Two blows for theatre lovers". Birmingham Daily Post. p. 19. OCLC 1080828265 – via British Newspaper Archive.
- "Diary move". Birmingham Daily Post. 9 October 1967. p. 27. OCLC 1080828265 – via British Newspaper Archive.
- "Mr. George Brown resigns". Birmingham Daily Post. 16 March 1968. p. 1. OCLC 1080828265 – via British Newspaper Archive.
- Duckworth, Leslie (26 March 1975). "Darling Mr. London ... at the Grand Theatre, Wolverhampton". Birmingham Daily Post. p. 2. OCLC 1080828265 – via British Newspaper Archive.
- Slim, John (21 October 1975). "One for the Pot ... at the Grand Theatre, Wolverhampton". Birmingham Daily Post. p. 24. OCLC 1080828265 – via British Newspaper Archive.
- "Christmas/New Year at the Rep". Birmingham Daily Post. 29 November 1977. p. 2. OCLC 1080828265 – via British Newspaper Archive.

==== Buckinghamshire Examiner ====
- Erskine, Sandy (7 January 1955). "High Wycombe. Just William, Alick Hayes from the book of Richmal Crompton, directed by Neil Gibson". Buckinghamshire Examiner. Chesham. p. 6. ISSN 0964-1432. OCLC 1065269176 – via British Newspaper Archive.
- Erskine, Sandy (14 January 1955). "High Wycombe. Me and My Girl, by L. Arthur Rose, Douglas Farber and Noel Gay, produced by Alfred Bradley". Buckinghamshire Examiner. Chesham. p. 2. ISSN 0964-1432. OCLC 1065269176 – via British Newspaper Archive.
- Erskine, Sandy (21 January 1955). "High Wycombe. Anna Christie, by Eugene O'Neill, directed by Neil Gibson". Buckinghamshire Examiner. Chesham. p. 10. ISSN 0964-1432. OCLC 1065269176 – via British Newspaper Archive.
- Erskine, Sandy (28 January 1955). "High Wycombe. The Archers, by Edward J. Mason and Geoffrey Webb, directed by Neil Gibson". Buckinghamshire Examiner. Chesham. p. 10. ISSN 0964-1432. OCLC 1065269176 – via British Newspaper Archive.
- Erskine, Sandy (4 February 1955). "High Wycombe. Beds, by Cedric Richards, directed by Neil Gibson". Buckinghamshire Examiner. Chesham. p. 8. ISSN 0964-1432. OCLC 1065269176 – via British Newspaper Archive.
- Erskine, Sandy (11 February 1955). "High Wycombe. A Question Of Fact, by Wynyard Browne, directed by Robert Grant". Buckinghamshire Examiner. Chesham. p. 2. ISSN 0964-1432. OCLC 1065269176 – via British Newspaper Archive.
- Erskine, Sandy (18 February 1955). "High Wycombe. Night Was Our Friend, by Michael Pertwee, directed by Neil Gibson". Buckinghamshire Examiner. Chesham. p. 10. ISSN 0964-1432. OCLC 1065269176 – via British Newspaper Archive.
- Erskine, Sandy (25 February 1955). "High Wycombe. The Martin's Nest, by Joan Morgan, directed by Neil Gibson". Buckinghamshire Examiner. Chesham. p. 12. ISSN 0964-1432. OCLC 1065269176 – via British Newspaper Archive.
- Erskine, Sandy (4 March 1955). "High Wycombe. Private Lives, by Noel Coward, directed by Steven Scott". Buckinghamshire Examiner. Chesham. p. 12. ISSN 0964-1432. OCLC 1065269176 – via British Newspaper Archive.
- Nemo (4 March 1955). "Kaleidoscope". Buckinghamshire Examiner. Chesham. p. 4. ISSN 0964-1432. OCLC 1065269176 – via British Newspaper Archive.
- Erskine, Sandy (11 March 1955). "High Wycombe. See How They Run, by Philip King, directed by Ivor Dun". Buckinghamshire Examiner. Chesham. p. 10. ISSN 0964-1432. OCLC 1065269176 – via British Newspaper Archive.
- Erskine, Sandy (18 March 1955). "High Wycombe. The Paragon, by Roland and Michael Pertwee, directed by Ivor Dean". Buckinghamshire Examiner. Chesham. p. 6. ISSN 0964-1432. OCLC 1065269176 – via British Newspaper Archive.
- Erskine, Sandy (25 March 1955). "High Wycombe. Separate Rooms, by Joseph Carol and Alan Dissehart, directed by Neil Gibson". Buckinghamshire Examiner. Chesham. p. 12. ISSN 0964-1432. OCLC 1065269176 – via British Newspaper Archive.
- Erskine, Sandy (1 April 1955). "High Wycombe. A Little of What You Fancy, by Robert S. Grant, directed by Neil Gibson". Buckinghamshire Examiner. Chesham. p. 10. ISSN 0964-1432. OCLC 1065269176 – via British Newspaper Archive.
- Erskine, Sandy (8 April 1955). "High Wycombe. The Dashing White Sergeant, by Charles Campbell Gairdner and Rosamunde Pilcher, directed by Neil Gibson". Buckinghamshire Examiner. Chesham. p. 12. ISSN 0964-1432. OCLC 1065269176 – via British Newspaper Archive.
- Erskine, Sandy (15 April 1955). "High Wycombe. The Seagulls Over Sorrento, by Hugh Hastings, directed by Neil Gibson". Buckinghamshire Examiner. Chesham. p. 6. ISSN 0964-1432. OCLC 1065269176 – via British Newspaper Archive.
- Erskine, Sandy (22 April 1955). "High Wycombe. East Lynne, by Mrs. Henry Wood, directed by Robert Grant". Buckinghamshire Examiner. Chesham. p. 6. ISSN 0964-1432. OCLC 1065269176 – via British Newspaper Archive.
- Erskine, Sandy (29 April 1955). "High Wycombe. Desire in the Night, by Patrick Cargill, directed by Neil Gibson". Buckinghamshire Examiner. Chesham. p. 6. ISSN 0964-1432. OCLC 1065269176 – via British Newspaper Archive.
- Paxman, Carol (6 May 1955). "High Wycombe. Sabrina Fair, by Samuel Taylor, directed by Neil Gibson". Buckinghamshire Examiner. Chesham. p. 10. ISSN 0964-1432. OCLC 1065269176 – via British Newspaper Archive.
- Paxman, Carol (13 May 1955). "High Wycombe. For Better, For Worse, by Arthur Watkyn, directed by Neil Gibson". Buckinghamshire Examiner. Chesham. p. 2. ISSN 0964-1432. OCLC 1065269176 – via British Newspaper Archive.
- Erskine, Sandy (20 May 1955). "High Wycombe. Waiting for Gillian, by Ronald Millar, directed by Neil Gibson". Buckinghamshire Examiner. Chesham. p. 16. ISSN 0964-1432. OCLC 1065269176 – via British Newspaper Archive.
- Erskine, Sandy (3 June 1955). "High Wycombe. Intimate Theatre: As Long as They're Happy, by Vernon Sylvaine, directed by Robert Grant". Buckinghamshire Examiner. Chesham. p. 8. ISSN 0964-1432. OCLC 1065269176 – via British Newspaper Archive.
- Erskine, Sandy (10 June 1955). "High Wycombe. Intimate Theatre: Jane Steps Out, by Kenneth Herne, directed by Neil Gibson". Buckinghamshire Examiner. Chesham. p. 10. ISSN 0964-1432. OCLC 1065269176 – via British Newspaper Archive.
- Erskine, Sandy (17 June 1955). "High Wycombe. Intimate Theatre: Blind Alley, by Jack Poppiewell, directed by Neil Gibson". Buckinghamshire Examiner. Chesham. p. 6. ISSN 0964-1432. OCLC 1065269176 – via British Newspaper Archive.
- Erskine, Sandy (24 June 1955). "High Wycombe. Intimate Theatre: The Seven Year Itch, by George Axelrod, directed by Robert Grant". Buckinghamshire Examiner. Chesham. p. 9. ISSN 0964-1432. OCLC 1065269176 – via British Newspaper Archive.
- Erskine, Sandy (1 July 1955). "High Wycombe. Intimate Theatre: Down Came a Blackbird, by Peter Blackmore, directed by Robert Grant". Buckinghamshire Examiner. Chesham. p. 10. ISSN 0964-1432. OCLC 1065269176 – via British Newspaper Archive.
- Erskine, Sandy (8 July 1955). "High Wycombe. Intimate Theatre: MacAdam and Eve, by Roger MacDougall, directed by Neil Gibson". Buckinghamshire Examiner. Chesham. p. 10. ISSN 0964-1432. OCLC 1065269176 – via British Newspaper Archive.
- Erskine, Sandy (5 August 1955). "High Wycombe. Intimate Theatre: He Walked In Her Sleep, by Norman Cannon, directed by Neil Gibson". Buckinghamshire Examiner. Chesham. p. 2. ISSN 0964-1432. OCLC 1065269176 – via British Newspaper Archive.
- Erskine, Sandy (12 August 1955). "High Wycombe. Intimate Theatre: And Then There Were None, by Agatha Christie, directed by Neil Gibson". Buckinghamshire Examiner. Chesham. p. 2. ISSN 0964-1432. OCLC 1065269176 – via British Newspaper Archive.
- Erskine, Sandy (19 August 1955). "High Wycombe. Intimate Theatre: Book O The Month by Basil Thomas, directed by Neil Gibson". Buckinghamshire Examiner. Chesham. p. 7. ISSN 0964-1432. OCLC 1065269176 – via British Newspaper Archive.
- Erskine, Sandy (2 September 1955). "High Wycombe. Intimate Theatre: The Love Match by Glenn Melvyn, directed by Neil Gibson". Buckinghamshire Examiner. Chesham. p. 7. ISSN 0964-1432. OCLC 1065269176 – via British Newspaper Archive.
- Erskine, Sandy (9 September 1955). "High Wycombe. Intimate Theatre: The Secret Tent by Elisabeth Addyman, directed by Neil Gibson". Buckinghamshire Examiner. Chesham. p. 10. ISSN 0964-1432. OCLC 1065269176 – via British Newspaper Archive.
- Erskine, Sandy (16 September 1955). "High Wycombe. Intimate Theatre: Worm's Eye View, by R. E. Delderfield, directed by Neil Gibson". Buckinghamshire Examiner. Chesham. p. 7. ISSN 0964-1432. OCLC 1065269176 – via British Newspaper Archive.
- Erskine, Sandy (23 September 1955). "High Wycombe. Intimate Theatre: The Moon is Blue, by F. Hugh Herbert, directed by Robert S. Grant". Buckinghamshire Examiner. Chesham. p. 14. ISSN 0964-1432. OCLC 1065269176 – via British Newspaper Archive.
- Erskine, Sandy (30 September 1955). "High Wycombe. Intimate Theatre: Rain, John Colton and Clemence Randolph, from Somerset Manaham's story Miss Thompson, directed by Steven Scott". Buckinghamshire Examiner. Chesham. p. 9. ISSN 0964-1432. OCLC 1065269176 – via British Newspaper Archive.
- Erskine, Sandy (7 October 1955). "High Wycombe. Intimate Theatre: Tons of Money, by Will Evans and Valentine, directed by Robert Grant". Buckinghamshire Examiner. Chesham. p. 6. ISSN 0964-1432. OCLC 1065269176 – via British Newspaper Archive.
- Birch, Clive (14 October 1955). "High Wycombe. Intimate Theatre: The Seaside, by Leslie Sands, produced by Steven Scott". Buckinghamshire Examiner. Chesham. p. 6. ISSN 0964-1432. OCLC 1065269176 – via British Newspaper Archive.
- Birch, Clive (21 October 1955). "High Wycombe. Intimate Theatre: Present Laughter, by Leslie Sands, by Noël Coward, directed by Harry Gwyn Davies". Buckinghamshire Examiner. Chesham. p. 6. ISSN 0964-1432. OCLC 1065269176 – via British Newspaper Archive.
- Birch, Clive (28 October 1955). "High Wycombe. Intimate Theatre: Witness for the Prosecution, by Agatha Christie, produced by Neil Gibson". Buckinghamshire Examiner. Chesham. p. 6. ISSN 0964-1432. OCLC 1065269176 – via British Newspaper Archive.
- Birch, Clive (18 November 1955). "High Wycombe. Intimate Theatre: Where There's A Will, by R. F. Delderfield, directed by Neil Gibson". Buckinghamshire Examiner. Chesham. p. 10. ISSN 0964-1432. OCLC 1065269176 – via British Newspaper Archive.
- Birch, Clive (2 December 1955). "High Wycombe. Intimate Theatre: Rising Heifer, by Robin Maugham, directed by Basil Ashmore and Neil Gibson". Buckinghamshire Examiner. Chesham. p. 10. ISSN 0964-1432. OCLC 1065269176 – via British Newspaper Archive.
- Birch, Clive (9 December 1955). "High Wycombe. Intimate Theatre: Job For The Boy, by Dennis Driscoll, directed by Neil Gibson". Buckinghamshire Examiner. Chesham. p. 2. ISSN 0964-1432. OCLC 1065269176 – via British Newspaper Archive.
- Birch, Clive (16 December 1955). "High Wycombe. Intimate Theatre: Random Harvest, by James Hilton, directed by Neil Gibson". Buckinghamshire Examiner. Chesham. p. 2. ISSN 0964-1432. OCLC 1065269176 – via British Newspaper Archive.
- Birch, Clive (30 December 1955). "High Wycombe. Intimate Theatre: Cinderella, words by Ronald Parr, music from Sir Arthur Sullivan, directed by Neil Gibson". Buckinghamshire Examiner. Chesham. p. 2. ISSN 0964-1432. OCLC 1065269176 – via British Newspaper Archive.
- Birch, Clive (13 January 1956). "High Wycombe. Intimate Theatre: Beauty and the Beast, by Nicholas Stuart Gray, directed by Steven Scott". Buckinghamshire Examiner. Chesham. p. 2. ISSN 0964-1432. OCLC 1065269176 – via British Newspaper Archive.
- Birch, Clive (20 January 1956). "High Wycombe. Intimate Theatre: Simon And Laura, by Alan Melville, directed by Neil Gibson". Buckinghamshire Examiner. Chesham. p. 8. ISSN 0964-1432. OCLC 1065269176 – via British Newspaper Archive.

==== The Canberra Times ====
- "Radio". The Canberra Times. 29 June 1968. p. 16. OCLC 220340116.
- "Actor leaves". The Canberra Times. 26 September 1973. p. 21. OCLC 220340116.

==== Cheshire Observer ====
- "Royalty Theatre". Cheshire Observer. Chester. 15 September 1956. p. 14. OCLC 1119849997 – via British Newspaper Archive.

==== Coventry Evening Telegraph ====
- "Forthcoming". Coventry Evening Telegraph. 16 September 1977. p. 18. OCLC 232330580 – via British Newspaper Archive.

==== Daily Mirror ====
- Short, Don (15 January 1966). "Bang!! goes Twang!!". Daily Mirror. London. p. 1. OCLC 11996384 – via British Newspaper Archive.
- "Poor George Brown". Daily Mirror. London. 1 April 1968. p. 11. OCLC 11996384 – via British Newspaper Archive.
- "TV Mirror". Daily Mirror. London. 28 January 1987. p. 16. OCLC 11996384 – via British Newspaper Archive.

==== The Daily Telegraph ====
- "Alan Plater: Obituaries Prolific dramatist whose acute ear for dialogue struck an authentic note in Z-Cars and Softly, Softly". The Daily Telegraph. London. 26 June 2010. p. 33. ISSN 0841-7180. OCLC 1081089956. Archived from the original on 1 January 2020.

==== The Illustrated London News ====
- Trewin, J. C. (17 August 1968). "Working like Trojans". The Illustrated London News. p. 27. ISSN 0019-2422. OCLC 1223470206 – via British Newspaper Archive.

==== The Independent ====
- Hayward, Anthony (21 November 2003). "Bob Grant. Lothario conductor in the sitcom On the buses". The Independent. London. p. 21. ISSN 0951-9467. OCLC 185201487. Archived from the original on 25 April 2019.

==== Kent & Sussex Courier ====
- "It's panto time again". Kent and Sussex Courier. Tunbridge Wells. 6 December 1968. p. 7. ISSN 1746-9317. OCLC 751610695 – via British Newspaper Archive.
- "Shows. Eastbourne". Kent and Sussex Courier. Tunbridge Wells. 15 November 1974. p. 27. ISSN 1746-9317. OCLC 751610695 – via British Newspaper Archive.
- Duckworth, Leslie (19 December 1975). "Choice of 7 pantomimes". Kent and Sussex Courier. Tunbridge Wells. p. 11. ISSN 1746-9317. OCLC 751610695 – via British Newspaper Archive.
- "Packed Winter Music Season". Kent and Sussex Courier. Tunbridge Wells. 27 October 1978. p. 16. ISSN 1746-9317. OCLC 751610695 – via British Newspaper Archive.

==== Lichfield Mercury ====
- "Cinders returns". Lichfield Mercury. 4 December 1981. p. 10. OCLC 855838931 – via British Newspaper Archive.
- "Christmas on the riverbank". Lichfield Mercury. 9 December 1983. p. 29. OCLC 855838931 – via British Newspaper Archive.
- "Rep hits gold". Lichfield Mercury. 21 December 1984. p. 22. OCLC 855838931 – via British Newspaper Archive.

==== Middlesex County Times ====
- "No more playing". Middlesex County Times. Ealing. 30 May 1980. p. 21. OCLC 751639097 – via British Newspaper Archive.

==== Newcastle Evening Chronicle ====
- Watson, Albert (10 May 1975). "Off the buses and on to the milk float". Newcastle Evening Chronicle. p. 5. ISSN 0960-3573. OCLC 749984539 – via British Newspaper Archive.

==== Newcastle Journal ====
- Billany, Fred (22 November 1968). "Why Mrs W's Diary was scrapped". Newcastle Journal. p. 1. ISSN 0307-3645. OCLC 500148937 – via British Newspaper Archive.
- "Getting to the bottom of a saucy story". Newcastle Journal. 19 January 1990. p. 7. ISSN 0307-3645. OCLC 500148937 – via British Newspaper Archive.

==== Perthshire Advertiser ====
- Fulton, Graham (27 March 1990). "Pitlochry theatre set for successful season". Perthshire Advertiser. Perth. p. 4. ISSN 1462-7205. OCLC 1064899316 – via British Newspaper Archive.
- "What's On". Perthshire Advertiser. Perth. 1 May 1990. p. 36. ISSN 1462-7205. OCLC 1064899316 – via British Newspaper Archive.
- Fulton, Graham (8 May 1990). "Murder and mayhem ... it's business as usual at Pitlochry!". Perthshire Advertiser. Perth. p. 21. ISSN 1462-7205. OCLC 1064899316 – via British Newspaper Archive.
- "Lesley Mackie returns to star in Perth Piaf". Perthshire Advertiser. Perth. 9 April 1991. p. 4. ISSN 1462-7205. OCLC 1064899316 – via British Newspaper Archive.
- Fulton, Graham (12 April 1991). "Bob is the World's Most Famous Bus Conductor". Perthshire Advertiser. Perth. p. 9. ISSN 1462-7205. OCLC 1064899316 – via British Newspaper Archive.
- "Peace Child celebrity night at Perth Theatre". Perthshire Advertiser. Perth. 26 April 1991. p. 15. ISSN 1462-7205. OCLC 1064899316 – via British Newspaper Archive.
- Fulton, Graham (3 December 1991). "Panto time at Perth Theatre". Perthshire Advertiser. Perth. p. 34. ISSN 1462-7205. OCLC 1064899316 – via British Newspaper Archive.
- Fulton, Graham (1 May 1992). "Blockbuster opens Pitlochry season". Perthshire Advertiser. Perth. p. 5. ISSN 1462-7205. OCLC 1064899316 – via British Newspaper Archive.
- Fulton, Graham (12 May 1992). "Logan in nursing home gives a five-star performance". Perthshire Advertiser. Perth. p. 11. ISSN 1462-7205. OCLC 1064899316 – via British Newspaper Archive.
- "The Spider is showing its age". Perthshire Advertiser. Perth. 19 May 1992. p. 11. ISSN 1462-7205. OCLC 1064899316 – via British Newspaper Archive.
- Fulton, Graham (6 October 1992). "Pitlochry Salesman production one for the record". Perthshire Advertiser. Perth. p. 37. ISSN 1462-7205. OCLC 1064899316 – via British Newspaper Archive.
- Fulton, Graham (18 May 1993). "Comedy cheer launches 1993 theatre season at Pitlochry". Perthshire Advertiser. Perth. p. 34. ISSN 1462-7205. OCLC 1064899316 – via British Newspaper Archive.
- Fulton, Graham (25 May 1993). "Contrasting but equally entertaining at Pitlochry". Perthshire Advertiser. Perth. p. 11. ISSN 1462-7205. OCLC 1064899316 – via British Newspaper Archive.
- "Major production gets stamp of approval". Perthshire Advertiser. Perth. 28 June 1994. p. 33. ISSN 1462-7205. OCLC 1064899316 – via British Newspaper Archive.
- Cargill, Peter (5 July 1994). "Timeless Barrie plays at Pitlochry". Perthshire Advertiser. Perth. p. 31. ISSN 1462-7205. OCLC 1064899316 – via British Newspaper Archive.

==== Reading Evening Post ====
- "Programme Highlights". Reading Evening Post. 4 January 1969. p. 9. ISSN 1353-9264. OCLC 1263776311 – via British Newspaper Archive.
- "Other events". Reading Evening Post. 10 January 1975. p. 10. ISSN 1353-9264. OCLC 1263776311 – via British Newspaper Archive.
- "What's On". Reading Evening Post. 12 September 1983. p. 8. ISSN 1353-9264. OCLC 1263776311 – via British Newspaper Archive.

==== Sandwell Evening Mail ====
- "Brum's own special arts Grant". Sandwell Evening Mail. 28 February 1986. p. 25. OCLC 52228801 – via British Newspaper Archive.

==== The Singapore Business Times ====
- Chua, Livia (17 November 1988). "Comic goings-on in a suburban house". The Singapore Business Times. p. 25. OCLC 464523982.
- Lye, Jaime (20 November 1988). "Good lines not quite enough". The Singapore Business Times. p. 12. OCLC 464523982.

==== The Stage ====
- "Rudolf Steiner Hall. PARADA Repertory Group". The Stage. London. 23 July 1953. p. 8. ISSN 0038-9099 – via British Newspaper Archive.
- "On Next Week". The Stage. London. 4 February 1954. p. 12. ISSN 0038-9099 – via British Newspaper Archive.
- "On Next Week". The Stage. London. 11 February 1954. p. 12. ISSN 0038-9099 – via British Newspaper Archive.
- "On Next Week". The Stage. London. 18 February 1954. p. 12. ISSN 0038-9099 – via British Newspaper Archive.
- "On Next Week". The Stage. London. 25 February 1954. p. 12. ISSN 0038-9099 – via British Newspaper Archive.
- "On Next Week". The Stage. London. 4 March 1954. p. 12. ISSN 0038-9099 – via British Newspaper Archive.
- "On Next Week". The Stage. London. 11 March 1954. p. 12. ISSN 0038-9099 – via British Newspaper Archive.
- "On Next Week". The Stage. London. 25 March 1954. p. 12. ISSN 0038-9099 – via British Newspaper Archive.
- "On Next Week". The Stage. London. 1 April 1954. p. 20. ISSN 0038-9099 – via British Newspaper Archive.
- "On Next Week". The Stage. London. 8 April 1954. p. 12. ISSN 0038-9099 – via British Newspaper Archive.
- "On Next Week". The Stage. London. 15 April 1954. p. 12. ISSN 0038-9099 – via British Newspaper Archive.
- "On Next Week". The Stage. London. 22 April 1954. p. 12. ISSN 0038-9099 – via British Newspaper Archive.
- "High Wycombe". The Stage. London. 29 April 1954. p. 12. ISSN 0038-9099 – via British Newspaper Archive.
- "On Next Week". The Stage. London. 6 May 1954. p. 12. ISSN 0038-9099 – via British Newspaper Archive.
- "On Next Week". The Stage. London. 13 May 1954. p. 12. ISSN 0038-9099 – via British Newspaper Archive.
- "On Next Week". The Stage. London. 20 May 1954. p. 12. ISSN 0038-9099 – via British Newspaper Archive.
- "On Next Week". The Stage. London. 27 May 1954. p. 12. ISSN 0038-9099 – via British Newspaper Archive.
- "On Next Week". The Stage. London. 3 June 1954. p. 12. ISSN 0038-9099 – via British Newspaper Archive.
- "On Next Week". The Stage. London. 22 July 1954. p. 12. ISSN 0038-9099 – via British Newspaper Archive.
- "On Next Week". The Stage. London. 5 August 1954. p. 12. ISSN 0038-9099 – via British Newspaper Archive.
- "On Next Week". The Stage. London. 12 August 1954. p. 12. ISSN 0038-9099 – via British Newspaper Archive.
- "On Next Week". The Stage. London. 19 August 1954. p. 12. ISSN 0038-9099 – via British Newspaper Archive.
- "On Next Week". The Stage. London. 2 September 1954. p. 12. ISSN 0038-9099 – via British Newspaper Archive.
- "On Next Week". The Stage. London. 9 September 1954. p. 12. ISSN 0038-9099 – via British Newspaper Archive.
- "On Next Week". The Stage. London. 16 September 1954. p. 12. ISSN 0038-9099 – via British Newspaper Archive.
- "York's 19th Birthday". The Stage. London. 23 September 1954. p. 12. ISSN 0038-9099 – via British Newspaper Archive.
- "On Next Week". The Stage. London. 30 September 1954. p. 12. ISSN 0038-9099 – via British Newspaper Archive.
- "On Next Week". The Stage. London. 7 October 1954. p. 12. ISSN 0038-9099 – via British Newspaper Archive.
- "On Next Week". The Stage. London. 14 October 1954. p. 12. ISSN 0038-9099 – via British Newspaper Archive.
- "On Next Week". The Stage. London. 21 October 1954. p. 12. ISSN 0038-9099 – via British Newspaper Archive.
- "On Next Week". The Stage. London. 28 October 1954. p. 12. ISSN 0038-9099 – via British Newspaper Archive.
- "High Wycombe has regular 'house-full' boards". The Stage. London. 4 November 1954. p. 16. ISSN 0038-9099 – via British Newspaper Archive.
- "On Next Week". The Stage. London. 11 November 1954. p. 12. ISSN 0038-9099 – via British Newspaper Archive.
- "On Next Week". The Stage. London. 2 December 1954. p. 12. ISSN 0038-9099 – via British Newspaper Archive.
- "F. J. B. Theatres. Norwich Hippodrome". The Stage. London. 26 July 1956. p. 2. ISSN 0038-9099 – via British Newspaper Archive.
- S., L. G. (3 July 1958). "Domestic Farce at Watford". The Stage. London. p. 9. ISSN 0038-9099 – via British Newspaper Archive.
- S., L. G. (18 December 1958). "A Good Idea Not Well Used". The Stage. London. p. 10. ISSN 0038-9099 – via British Newspaper Archive.
- "Watford. Robinson Crusoe". The Stage. London. 1 January 1959. p. 9. ISSN 0038-9099 – via British Newspaper Archive.
- "Return to Watford". The Stage. London. 5 November 1959. p. 20. ISSN 0038-9099 – via British Newspaper Archive.
- S., L. G. (7 January 1960). "Watford. Babes in the Wood". The Stage. London. p. 38. ISSN 0038-9099 – via British Newspaper Archive.
- "New Musical Farce". The Stage. London. 25 February 1960. p. 27. ISSN 0038-9099 – via British Newspaper Archive.
- "New Musical Farce on Way to Town". The Stage. London. 3 March 1960. p. 18. ISSN 0038-9099 – via British Newspaper Archive.
- "Berlin Festival". The Stage. London. 12 May 1960. p. 22. ISSN 0038-9099 – via British Newspaper Archive.
- H, P (7 July 1960). "Dealing with Jonson at Breakneck Speed". The Stage. London. p. 18. ISSN 0038-9099 – via British Newspaper Archive.
- L, J-P (7 July 1960). "Jonson in Paris". The Stage. London. p. 17. ISSN 0038-9099 – via British Newspaper Archive.
- M., R. B. (1 September 1960). "Theatre Workshop. Joan Littlewood lmost makes the Sparrers Sing!". The Stage. London. p. 17. ISSN 0038-9099 – via British Newspaper Archive.
- "Sparrers for Berlin Festival". The Stage. London. 29 September 1960. p. 1. ISSN 0038-9099 – via British Newspaper Archive.
- "Lock, Stock and Barrel". The Stage. London. 13 October 1960. p. 17. ISSN 0038-9099 – via British Newspaper Archive.
- "Charley's Aunt". The Stage. London. 5 January 1961. p. 32. ISSN 0038-9099 – via British Newspaper Archive.
- "Underdog with pipe-dreams". The Stage. London. 21 September 1961. p. 15. ISSN 0038-9099 – via British Newspaper Archive.
- "Big Soft Nellie". The Stage. London. 16 November 1961. p. 8. ISSN 0038-9099 – via British Newspaper Archive.
- "Blitz". The Stage. London. 22 March 1962. p. 8. ISSN 0038-9099 – via British Newspaper Archive.
- Lenoir, Jean-Pierre (26 July 1962). "Jean-Pierre Lenoir Sums up the Sixth Annual Season of Theatre of the Nations". The Stage. London. p. 15. ISSN 0038-9099 – via British Newspaper Archive.
- "Blitz! - Broadway's Most Costly Show". The Stage. London. 15 August 1963. p. 1. ISSN 0038-9099 – via British Newspaper Archive.
- "Don't Ask Me". The Stage. London. 4 June 1964. p. 27. ISSN 0038-9099 – via British Newspaper Archive.
- "Name change for Albery/Rix Musical". The Stage. London. 16 July 1964. p. 1. ISSN 0038-9099 – via British Newspaper Archive.
- "Yorkshire Relish". The Stage. London. 1 April 1965. p. 7. ISSN 0038-9099 – via British Newspaper Archive.
- "Littlewood Returns to Direct Macbird". The Stage. London. 23 March 1967. p. 17. ISSN 0038-9099 – via British Newspaper Archive.
- "Littlewood's Return with Macbird". The Stage. London. 13 April 1967. p. 18. ISSN 0038-9099 – via British Newspaper Archive.
- Marriott, R. B. (1 June 1967). "Theatre Should be Full for this Production". The Stage. London. p. 13. ISSN 0038-9099 – via British Newspaper Archive.
- H., P. (28 September 1967). "The Wilsons Lampooned". The Stage. London. p. 15. ISSN 0038-9099 – via British Newspaper Archive.
- Marriott, R. B. (30 November 1967). "Joan Littlewood stages The Marie Lloyd Story". The Stage. London. p. 13. ISSN 0038-9099 – via British Newspaper Archive.
- "Plater premiere". The Stage. London. 25 July 1968. p. 22. ISSN 0038-9099 – via British Newspaper Archive.
- Marriott, R. B. (10 October 1968). "Build homes for people, not on top of people!". The Stage. London. p. 13. ISSN 0038-9099 – via British Newspaper Archive.
- B., P. W. (17 October 1968). "Lenz and Brecht at the Court". The Stage. London. p. 7. ISSN 0038-9099 – via British Newspaper Archive.
- M., R. B. (25 September 1969). "Pyjama Tops at the Whitehall". The Stage. London. p. 15. ISSN 0038-9099 – via British Newspaper Archive.
- Marriott, R. B. (6 April 1972). "Littlewood back at Stratford Royal with The Londoners". The Stage. London. p. 10. ISSN 0038-9099 – via British Newspaper Archive.
- "Stop It, Nurse!". The Stage. London. 17 August 1972. p. 56. ISSN 0038-9099 – via British Newspaper Archive.
- "Busman's Holiday at the Pavilion". The Stage. London. 16 August 1973. p. 84. ISSN 0038-9099 – via British Newspaper Archive.
- "Mike and Bernie Go West". The Stage. London. 23 August 1973. p. 14. ISSN 0038-9099 – via British Newspaper Archive.
- "News and people in Australia". The Stage. London. 6 December 1973. p. 24. ISSN 0038-9099 – via British Newspaper Archive.
- "No Sex, Please We're British". The Stage. London. 15 August 1974. p. 80. ISSN 0038-9099 – via British Newspaper Archive.
- "Aldershot action". The Stage. London. 17 October 1974. p. 7. ISSN 0038-9099 – via British Newspaper Archive.
- "ATV plan to find fresh sit com. Network plays to be seen next month". The Stage. London. 15 May 1975. p. 11. ISSN 0038-9099 – via British Newspaper Archive.
- E., B. (11 September 1975). "Touring One For The Pot". The Stage. London. p. 17. ISSN 0038-9099 – via British Newspaper Archive.
- "On the Way". The Stage. London. 26 February 1976. p. 1. ISSN 0038-9099 – via British Newspaper Archive.
- "Triumph tours '77". The Stage. London. 6 January 1977. p. 1. ISSN 0038-9099 – via British Newspaper Archive.
- Melling, John Kennedy (13 January 1977). "Southend". The Stage. London. p. 34. ISSN 0038-9099 – via British Newspaper Archive.
- "Shanklin. Shanklin Thetare". The Stage. London. 8 June 1978. p. 5. ISSN 0038-9099 – via British Newspaper Archive.
- "Isle of Wight. Repertory". The Stage. London. 17 August 1978. pp. 69–70. ISSN 0038-9099 – via British Newspaper Archive.
- "Regional Theatre". The Stage. London. 26 October 1978. p. 22. ISSN 0038-9099 – via British Newspaper Archive.
- Fitzgerald, Ann (23 November 1978). "Birmingham". The Stage. London. p. 21. ISSN 0038-9099 – via British Newspaper Archive.
- "Regional Theatre". The Stage. London. 11 January 1979. p. 16. ISSN 0038-9099 – via British Newspaper Archive.
- "Summer Shows 1979". The Stage. London. 28 June 1979. p. 8. ISSN 0038-9099 – via British Newspaper Archive.
- "Weymouth. Doctor In The House". The Stage. London. 16 August 1979. p. 101. ISSN 0038-9099 – via British Newspaper Archive.
- "All-star cast for Ashcroft panto". The Stage. London. 22 August 1979. p. 3. ISSN 0038-9099 – via British Newspaper Archive.
- "Author's objection halts nude show". The Stage. London. 18 November 1979. p. 1. ISSN 0038-9099 – via British Newspaper Archive.
- "Come Play With Me". The Stage. London. 14 February 1980. p. 29. ISSN 0038-9099 – via British Newspaper Archive.
- "Paul Tomlinson rehearses". The Stage. London. 14 February 1980. p. 27. ISSN 0038-9099 – via British Newspaper Archive.
- "Production News". The Stage. London. 26 June 1980. p. 25. ISSN 0038-9099 – via British Newspaper Archive.
- Braun, Eric (19 February 1981). "Familiar presence reassures". The Stage. London. p. 23. ISSN 0038-9099 – via British Newspaper Archive.
- "On Next Week". The Stage. London. 25 February 1982. p. 35. ISSN 0038-9099 – via British Newspaper Archive.
- "York. Anyone For Denis?". The Stage. London. 18 March 1982. p. 9. ISSN 0038-9099 – via British Newspaper Archive.
- "Birmingham. Alexandra". The Stage. London. 16 December 1982. p. 37. ISSN 0038-9099 – via British Newspaper Archive.
- "Hornchurch. Comic Cuts". The Stage. London. 14 April 1983. p. 15. ISSN 0038-9099 – via British Newspaper Archive.
- "Production News". The Stage. London. 8 September 1983. p. 2. ISSN 0038-9099 – via British Newspaper Archive.
- Tatlow, Peter (20 October 1983). "Falling about at nuclear fall out. Guildford. Keeping Down With the Jones'". The Stage. London. p. 11. ISSN 0038-9099 – via British Newspaper Archive.
- "On Next Week". The Stage. London. 17 May 1984. p. 35. ISSN 0038-9099 – via British Newspaper Archive.
- "Weymouth Pavilion". The Stage. London. 28 June 1984. p. 10. ISSN 0038-9099 – via British Newspaper Archive.
- "Summer 84 Stage. Bournemouth cont. Pyjama Tops". The Stage. London. 16 August 1984. p. 16. ISSN 0038-9099 – via British Newspaper Archive.
- FitzGerald, Ann (17 January 1985). "Birmingham. Treasure Island". The Stage. London. p. 11. ISSN 0038-9099 – via British Newspaper Archive.
- "Bob Grant - off the buses and into No 10". The Stage. London. 20 June 1985. p. 14. ISSN 0038-9099 – via British Newspaper Archive.
- "The Dennis season". The Stage. London. 4 July 1985. p. 23. ISSN 0038-9099 – via British Newspaper Archive.
- "Panto News". The Stage. London. 17 October 1985. p. 3. ISSN 0038-9099 – via British Newspaper Archive.
- Davies, Mike (23 January 1986). "Leicester. Cinderella". The Stage. London. p. 26. ISSN 0038-9099 – via British Newspaper Archive.
- "Production News". The Stage. London. 6 March 1986. p. 23. ISSN 0038-9099 – via British Newspaper Archive.
- "Sally Cinders". The Stage. London. 6 November 1986. p. 4. ISSN 0038-9099 – via British Newspaper Archive.
- Tatlow, Peter (22 January 1987). "Redhill. Cinderella". The Stage. London. p. 20. ISSN 0038-9099 – via British Newspaper Archive.
- Hepple, Peter (14 January 1988). "Palmers Green. Jack and the Beanstalk". The Stage. London. p. 22. ISSN 0038-9099 – via British Newspaper Archive.
- "Production News. Bob Grant". The Stage. London. 16 November 1989. p. 12. ISSN 0038-9099 – via British Newspaper Archive.
- "Theatre News. Griffin demise". The Stage. London. 15 March 1990. p. 2. ISSN 0038-9099 – via British Newspaper Archive.
- Fulton, Graham (9 August 1990). "Pitlochry. The Little Foxes". The Stage. London. p. 16. ISSN 0038-9099 – via British Newspaper Archive.
- Fulton, Graham (11 October 1990). "Pitlochry. The Cherry Orchard". The Stage. London. p. 34. ISSN 0038-9099 – via British Newspaper Archive.
- "Production News. Seven Brides for Seven Brothers". The Stage. London. 15 November 1990. p. 12. ISSN 0038-9099 – via British Newspaper Archive.
- "Production News". The Stage. London. 7 February 1991. p. 11. ISSN 0038-9099 – via British Newspaper Archive.
- Fulton, Graham (9 May 1991). "Perth. Piaf". The Stage. London. p. 21. ISSN 0038-9099 – via British Newspaper Archive.
- "Production News". The Stage. London. 15 April 1993. p. 10. ISSN 0038-9099 – via British Newspaper Archive.
- Fulton, Graham (27 May 1993). "Pitlochry. A Flea In Her Ear". The Stage. London. p. 24. ISSN 0038-9099 – via British Newspaper Archive.
- "Production News". The Stage. London. 5 August 1993. p. 11. ISSN 0038-9099 – via British Newspaper Archive.
- "Pitlochry Festival". The Stage. London. 5 May 1994. p. 10. ISSN 0038-9099 – via British Newspaper Archive.
- "Pitlochry. Murder at the Vicarage". The Stage. London. 30 June 1994. p. 26. ISSN 0038-9099 – via British Newspaper Archive.
- Fulton, Graham (7 July 1994). "Pitlochry. Hobson's Choice". The Stage. London. p. 27. ISSN 0038-9099 – via British Newspaper Archive.
- "Theatre Week". The Stage. London. 11 May 1995. p. 43. ISSN 0038-9099 – via British Newspaper Archive.
- "On Next Week". The Stage. London. 4 January 1996. p. 38. ISSN 0038-9099 – via British Newspaper Archive.
- Fulton, Graham (12 June 1997). "Pitlochry. Breaking the Code". The Stage. London. p. 13. ISSN 0038-9099 – via British Newspaper Archive.
- "Pitlochry. The Sunshine Boys". The Stage. London. 31 July 1997. p. 12. ISSN 0038-9099 – via British Newspaper Archive.
- "Eastbourne. Funny Money". The Stage. London. 16 July 1998. p. 14. ISSN 0038-9099 – via British Newspaper Archive.

==== Staines & Ashford News ====
- "Theatres". Staines & Ashford News. 31 August 1995. p. 23. ISSN 1743-4572. OCLC 500155765 – via British Newspaper Archive.

==== The Sun ====
- "Where to sea stars for free". The Sun. London. 18 June 1998. p. 2. ISSN 0307-2681. OCLC 723661694. ProQuest 369030671.

==== The Tatler ====
- Cookman, Anthony (8 June 1960). "This workshop needs tidying". Tatler. London. p. 38. ISSN 0263-7162. OCLC 60627370 – via British Newspaper Archive.
- Cookman, Anthony (20 November 1965). "The troubles of Twang!!". Tatler. London. pp. 25–26. ISSN 0263-7162. OCLC 60627370 – via British Newspaper Archive.

==== The Times ====
- "The Arts. Duke Of York's Theatre: The Good Soldier Schweik". The Times. No. 53481. London. 16 March 1956. p. 3. ISSN 0140-0460. OCLC 819006206. Gale CS50681456.
- "Kelly Gang Played As Romantics". The Times. No. 54779. London. 24 May 1960. p. 16. ISSN 0140-0460. OCLC 819006206. Gale CS268656312.
- "Brecht Company's Paris Award". The Times. No. 54823. London. 14 July 1960. p. 6. ISSN 0140-0460. OCLC 819006206. Gale CS101539566.
- "Two Festivals in Berlin". The Times. No. 54870. London. 7 September 1960. p. 16. ISSN 0140-0460. OCLC 819006206. Gale CS270098215.
- "The Sparrers did not sing". The Times. No. 54896. London. 7 October 1960. p. 6. ISSN 0140-0460. OCLC 819006206. Gale CS101277511.
- "Theatre Workshop At Wyndham's". The Times. No. 55034. London. 20 March 1961. p. 3. ISSN 0140-0460. OCLC 819006206. Gale CS51994740.
- "A Mother Courage of Petticoat Lane". The Times. No. 55386. London. 9 May 1962. p. 5. ISSN 0140-0460. OCLC 819006206. Gale CS84107945.
- "London to See The Poker Session". The Times. No. 55921. London. 29 January 1964. p. 13. ISSN 0140-0460. OCLC 819006206. Gale CS219375165.
- "Weekend Broadcasting". The Times. No. 56013. London. 16 May 1964. p. 12. ISSN 0140-0460. OCLC 819006206. Gale CS202729136.
- "ITV/London". The Times. No. 62724. London. 24 March 1987. p. 41. ISSN 0140-0460. OCLC 819006206. Gale IF0500037491.

==== West Sussex County Times ====
- "Theatre Royal, Carfax, Horsham". West Sussex County Times. Horsham. 1 May 1953. p. 4. OCLC 469839222 – via British Newspaper Archive.
