= Samuel Cowan (historian) =

Scottish historian

- Born: 1835
- Died: 18 June 1914 (aged 78 or 79)

Samuel Cowan (1835 – 18 June 1914) was a Scottish historian, antiquarian, biographer, publisher and journalist who wrote several books, including Mary Queen of Scots and Who Wrote the Casket Letters (1901), The Gowrie Conspiracy (1902), The Ancient Capital of Scotland (1904) and The Royal House of Stuart (1908).

Cowan was also a justice of the peace.

Between 1866 and 1907, Cowan was the printer and publisher of the Perthshire Advertiser.

== Personal life ==
His father was James Cowan, registrar of Monkton and Prestwick.

In 1864, Cowan married Jane Jack, of Largs, with whom he had one son and two daughters. At the time of his death, the family was living at 33 Fountainhall Road in Edinburgh.

Cowan was a member of the Society of Antiquaries of Scotland.
