= Frank Vance Strauss =

Ohio businessman

Frank Vance Strauss was an Ohio businessman who was the first to specialize in printing the theatre programme in New York City.

He was born on 04 Jan 1863 in Columbus, Ohio, to Nathan Strauss and Hanna Strauss nee Heilberg. He later changed his name to Frank Vance Storrs. He married Amanda Mayer on 18 Sep 1906 in Cleveland, Ohio. They had two daughters, Carolyn Mayer Storrs and Anne Mayer Storrs. He died on 09 Mar 1939 at age 66 in West Palm Beach, Florida.

Strauss began by collecting ads for the Madison Square Theatre and transformed the programme from a four-page leaflet into a magazine playbill that included advertisements and the credits. Strauss began his work in 1884 and a year later recruited companies like Caswell Massey, Runkel Brothers Cocoa, and Schirmer Pianos to be advertised in his programs. In 1891, Strauss merged with his main competitor and, by 1905, standardized the "design and layout of the programs so that the makeup would be easier and the sizes of advertising space uniform."

Because the programs were of higher quality, audiences collected them as souvenirs. Strauss and other publishers started to create albums and leather-bound volumes specifically for collecting programs. In 1918, Strauss sold the company to his nephew, Richard M. Huber. Under Huber, the company's name changed to The Magazine Theater Program, and by 1924, it was printing 16,000,000 playbills for over 60 theatres. This began Huber's monopoly over program printing for Broadway theatres.

Although Strauss founded the idea for the magazine Playbill, Huber is given credit for starting the New York Theater Program Corporation, which in 1934-35 titled its magazine The Playbill. The Playbill layout varied during this time. The more successful a show is, the more pages The Playbill contains. Anything Goes was 48 pages while the Post Road was only 12 pages. Advertisements could also subscribe to a specific show and not a whole season. This was evident when advertisements contained the show's title within their ads. During the production of Rain or Shine, Rogers Peet Company clothing store placed an ad that read, “Rain or shine Scotch Mists are fine. Handsome, stylish overcoats that are wetproof, too!” Advertisements were not the only additions to the playbill, but also short articles that discussed fashion, car care, book reviews, interviews, and even jokes.

In 1956, after 70 years as a family company, Huber sold The Playbill to producer and real estate magnate Roger L. Stevens. Stevens changed the name to Playbill and no longer allowed a production's image to dominate the cover. Instead, the cover was a generic design with the play's information inside the Playbill. Public outcry forced Stevens to allow a colorful band to strip across the top of the Playbill with the show's information printed underneath. Over time, the colorful band generalized into the yellow strip that is still common in today's Playbill.

Theatre playbills have become very valuable articles of information about a city or nation’s cultural history. The current Playbill collects samples of all their publications, which helps researchers understand what genre of theatre was produced during a particular decade. Unfortunately, a fire destroyed all of Playbill’s theatre listings before 1924.
