= Instant Marriage =

Instant Marriage is a musical with music by Laurie Holloway and words by Bob Grant.

It premiered at the Piccadilly Theatre in London on 1 August 1964, playing for 366 performances. The cast featured Joan Sims, Paul Whitsun-Jones, Bob Grant, Stephanie Voss, Rex Garner, Harold Goodwin and Wallas Eaton.

There was an Australian production in 1965, playing at the Tivoli Theatre in each of Melbourne and Sydney.
