= Wycombe Repertory Theatre =

Building in High Wycombe, England

Coordinates: 51.6323°N 0.7528°W

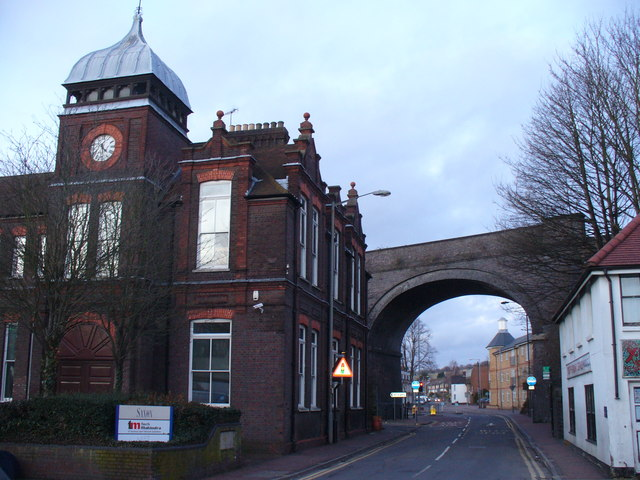
Former Wycombe Repertory Theatre

The Wycombe Repertory Theatre, later referred to as the Tower Theatre and the Intimate Theatre, was a repertory (or stock) theatre in High Wycombe, Buckinghamshire. It opened in 1946 and closed in 1958.

== History ==
The Wycombe Repertory Theatre opened on 16 December 1946, an event attended by Hugh Williams. The original management consisted of director Ian Dobbie, production manager Nick Simms, stage manager Jack Stone, and catering manager Edward Shoesmith, the four of whom had served with the Royal Electrical and Mechanical Engineers during World War II. The first play at the Wycombe was Gerald Savoy's George and Margaret. The theatre contained approximately 300 seats.

In March 1952 the theatre, which had undergone various personnel changes since its opening, was renamed to the Tower Theatre. In June 1953, an appeal was made for increased attendance in order to keep the theatre open. Though the theatre did indeed remain open, it was taken over in August of that year by George Radford. The first play produced under this new management was The Gioconda Smile.

In 1954, management of the theatre changed hands to actor-producer Neil Gibson. The theatre was renamed once again in 1955, this time to the Intimate Theatre. The theatre went on to experience financial difficulties throughout the late 1950s. Attempts to remedy these difficulties included subscription-based ticket sales, the opening of a membership-only licensed bar, and a Supporters' Club dance. While these activities were successful in their own right, they did little to improve the financial situation of the theatre. In April 1957, Gibson announced that he was closing the theatre for the summer.

The theatre reopened in July 1957. Despite various attempts to draw in larger crowds, the theatre's financial difficulties continued through 1958. In December of that year, Gibson announced the final closure of the theatre after having presented nearly 400 shows in its 12 years of operation.
