= Twang!! =

1965 musical by Lionel Bart

- London Cast Album cover
- Music: Lionel Bart
- Lyrics: Lionel Bart
- Book: Lionel Bart & Harvey Orkin
- Basis: The Robin Hood legend
- Productions: 1965 West End

Twang!! is a musical with music and lyrics written by Lionel Bart and a book by Bart and Harvey Orkin, an American theatrical agent and former writer for The Phil Silvers Show. When production faced issues, American writer Burt Shevelove was called on to help fix the book. The piece, a spoof of the character and legend of Robin Hood, was a disastrous box-office failure and cost Bart his personal fortune.

After a preview in Manchester, Twang!! opened at the Shaftesbury Theatre in London's West End on 20 December 1965 and closed on 29 January 1966 after just 43 performances, receiving scathing reviews and playing to mostly empty houses. Bart produced it with Bernard Delfont and John Bryan, and Joan Littlewood directed but quit before it opened. She was replaced by Shevelove and Bart. Twang!! is remembered as "the most expensive flop" in West End history up to that time.

In 2008, the Estate of Lionel Bart commissioned Julian Woolford to write a new book for the musical which was performed in 2013 at Guildford School of Acting. This version is now licensed through MTI.

== Synopsis ==
Robin Hood and his Merry Men attempt to break into Nottingham Castle, in a variety of preposterous disguises, in order to prevent a marriage between the nymphomaniac "court tart" Delphina and the hairy Scots laird Roger the Ugly, arranged for the purpose of securing the loan of Scottish troops for bad Prince John.

The new version is a "meta-musical" with a completely different plot. Robin Hood has lost his 'Twang' and is not the hero he once was. Much the Miller's Son arrives in Sherwood Forest having run away from home and is arrested by the sheriff. He is rescued by Robin and the Men before discovering that in Nottinghamshire life is a musical comedy. He falls in love with Delphina whilst Maid Marion helps Robin find his missing 'twang' before King Richard returns to re-establish order.

== Roles and principal cast ==
- Alan-a-Dale – Elric Hooper
- Sir Guy of Gisborne – Howard Goorney
- Mystery Voice in "Unseen Hands" – Long John Baldry
- Mutch – Kent Baker
- Robin Hood – James Booth
- Little John – Bernard Bresslaw
- Will Scarlett – Ronnie Corbett
- Friar Tuck – Will Stampe
- Sheriff of Nottingham – Bob Grant
- Maid Marian – Toni Eden
- Prince John – Maxwell Shaw
- Delphina – Barbara Windsor
- Roger the Ugly – Philip Newman

== Production ==
The cast included the strongest players from Littlewood's Theatre Workshop, including Ronnie Corbett, Barbara Windsor and James Booth. But Twang!! ran into difficulty from the start. The script was weak, especially the part of Robin Hood, which was badly underwritten. When Booth expressed his concerns, he was repeatedly assured that the part would be expanded to a starring role. Littlewood demanded a rewrite, but constant, confusing revisions failed to improve the script. Littlewood, the choreographer Paddy Stone, the designer Oliver Messel, and the writers failed to work together. Rehearsals were disorganised and fraught with tension; Bart was drinking; Littlewood threatened to walk out. At a rehearsal, Littlewood accused Bart of failing to fulfill his creative responsibilities because he was too strung-out on LSD. Bart, in turn, accused Littlewood of ruining the piece.

A Birmingham tryout was scheduled and cancelled. A Manchester preview opened on 3 November 1965 at the Palace Theatre with a script that was unfinished. Word of the disaster leaked to the tabloids. Littlewood quit the company, and a script doctor, American Burt Shevelove, was brought in to fix the script and score, leading to more confusing changes, but nothing helped. The scenes had no relation to the songs, and Twang!! transferred to London preceded by continued bad press. The show opened in disarray at London's Shaftesbury Theatre on 20 December 1965. Still, Bart thought he could save the show. On opening night, the musical director, Ken Moule, collapsed of exhaustion and still had failed to orchestrate the second act. Two songs were cut in the hours before the curtain rose, and the piece was played for camp, even adding some transvestism. The house lights kept going up and down throughout the performance, and vicious arguments were overheard backstage. Twang!! garnered scornful and derisive reviews. The critics noted the lack of heroics and the pseudo-pantomime delivery, although there were some effective musical sequences, including a scene around a gallows that became a morris dance around a maypole. Windsor also came in for some praise.

The show had been intended as a romp that poked fun at the Crusades, the attitude of the Church and the human flaw of wanting to turn an outlaw into a hero. Orkin believed the show failed because they failed to establish the exact butt of that satire; it was too vague and inconsequential. Bart lost his personal fortune in Twang!! and was devastated by the failure of the show. So was Booth, who made no money for a year while preparing for it. For Ronnie Corbett, however, the failure of Twang!! was a lucky break – it meant he was free to participate in The Frost Report, his breakthrough in television, and also the show where he first worked with Ronnie Barker. Orkin went on to be a regular on the short-lived Not So Much a Programme, More a Way of Life, as well as vice-president of Columbia Pictures. He wrote the novel Scuffler, which was praised by humorist S. J. Perelman and the actor Richard Burton when it was published in 1974.

When revived at the Union Theatre, London in 2018, the musical received some positive reviews. It was dubbed "a meta-musical with bags of heart" by The Stage.

== Songs ==
Act I

- May a Man Be Merry – Alan-a-Dale
- Welcome to Sherwood Forest – Robin, Mutch, Little John, Will, Friar Tuck, Alan-a-Dale
- Wander – Robin, Marian
- What Makes a Star? – Prince John, Heralds and Company
- Make an Honest Woman [of Me] – Delphina, Crusaders' Wives
- Roger the Ugly – Prince John, Sir Guy, Sheriff
- To the Woods – Marian, Delphina
- Dreamchild – Marian
- With Bells On – Robin and Company
- Sighs – Little John, Delphina, Alan-a-Dale
- You Can't Catch Me! – Robin, Marian

Act II

- Living a Legend – Robin
- Unseen Hands – Mystery Voice
- Writing on the Wall – Delphina
- Wander (reprise) – Marian, Robin
- Roger the Ugly (reprise) – Prince John, Sir Guy, Sheriff, Sir Roger
- Whose Little Girl Are You? – Delphina
- Follow the Leader – Little John, Will, Alan-a-Dale, Mutch, Friar Tuck
- I'll Be Hanged – Robin, Company
- Tan-Ta-Ra! – Robin, Marian, Company

A cast album, produced by George Martin, was recorded and released in 1966 on the United Artists Records label on LP (no. ULP 1116). It was re-released in 1987 on the TER label (no. 1055) on LP and cassette. A CD-R pressing was sold in the U.S. exclusively through the online reseller Footlight in 2011. The recording includes a track called "Twang!!" at the beginning of side B.
