= Comedy Playhouse (series 9) =

The ninth series of Comedy Playhouse, the long-running BBC series, consisted of four episodes and aired from 18 December 1969 to 15 January 1970.

== Background ==
Series Nine, which was the first to be in colour, consisted of four episodes, each of which had a different cast, storyline and writer. None of the episodes made it to its own series. All episodes were aired on Thursday at 7:30pm on BBC1 and were 30 minutes long.

== Episodes ==
Title	Airdate	Writers	Overview	IMDb link
Joint Account	18 December 1969	Michael Seddon	Keith Barron starred as Rodney, who had recently married Celia (played by Sarah Atkinson), who is a dreadful cook. Geoffrey Whitehead played George.	
The Jugg Brothers	1 January 1970	Bob Grant & Stephen Lewis	Bob Grant and Stephen Lewis, who starred together in On the Buses, starred as Robert and Stephen Jugg. Fanny Carby also starred as Lilly Dolly and Queenie Watts starred as Annie Bundle.	
An Officer and a Gentleman	8 January 1970	Myles Rudge	In this programme, James Grout starred as Major Gissing, while Ken Wynne played Sid Coil, Patricia Hayes played Mrs Telfer, Diana King played Miss Jellicoe and Raymond Westwell played Dimitri Yevgenyvitch.	
Who's Your Friend?	15 January 1970	Terence Edmond	Who's Your Friend was set in an escort agency, with Bernard Cribbins as Jimmy Sampson, a professional escort. Maggie Fitzgibbon starred as Laura Marshall and Frank Thornton appeared as Mr Walters.	
