= Programme (booklet) =

Informational booklet given out before a live event

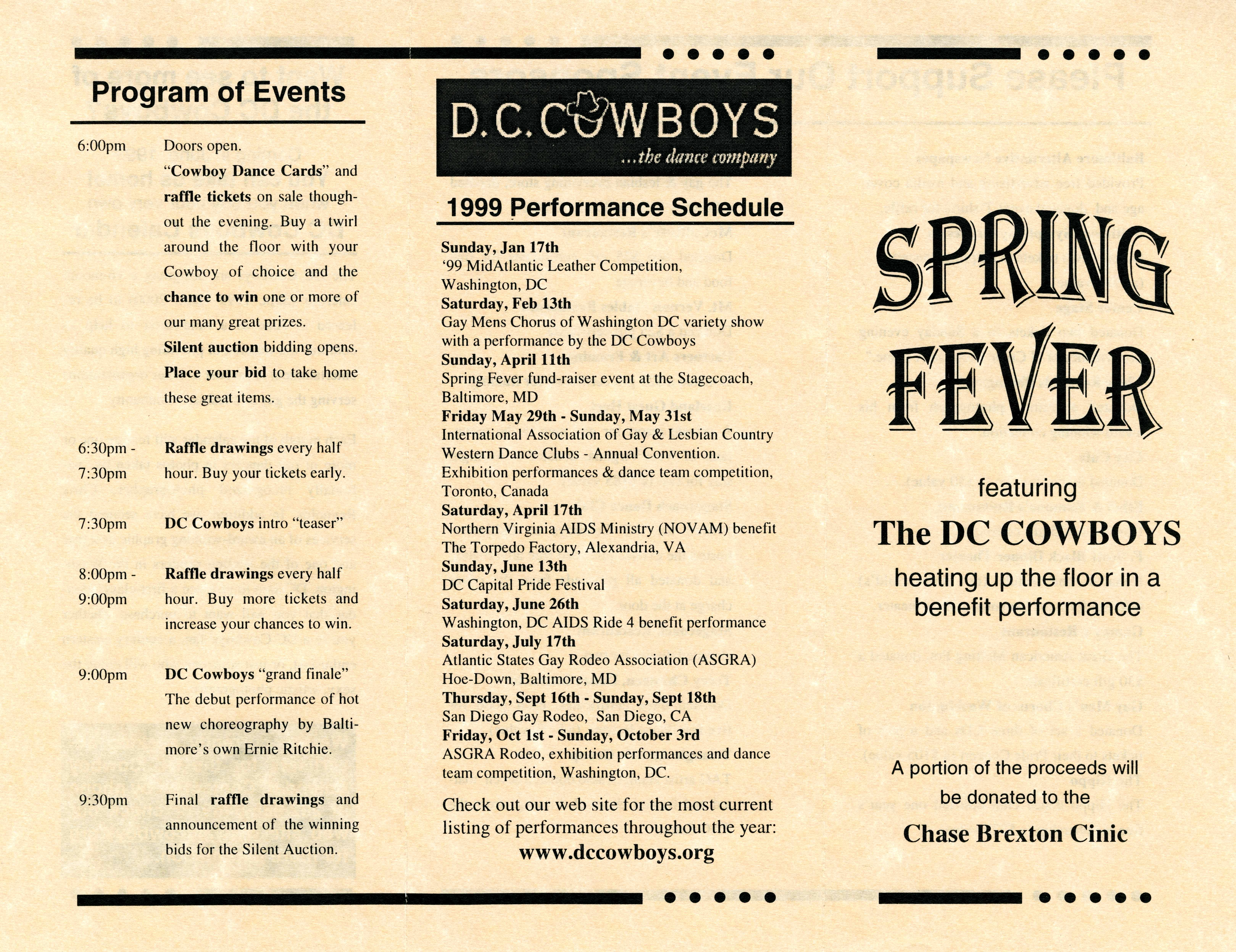
Programme from a DC Cowboys dance company event in 1999, listing the timings of the events of the evening

A programme or program (see spelling differences) is a booklet available for patrons attending a live event such as theatre performances, concerts, fêtes, sports events, etc. It is a printed leaflet outlining the parts of the event scheduled to take place, principal performers and background information. In the case of theatrical performances, the term playbill is also used. It may be provided free of charge by the event organisers or a charge may be levied.

== Performing arts ==
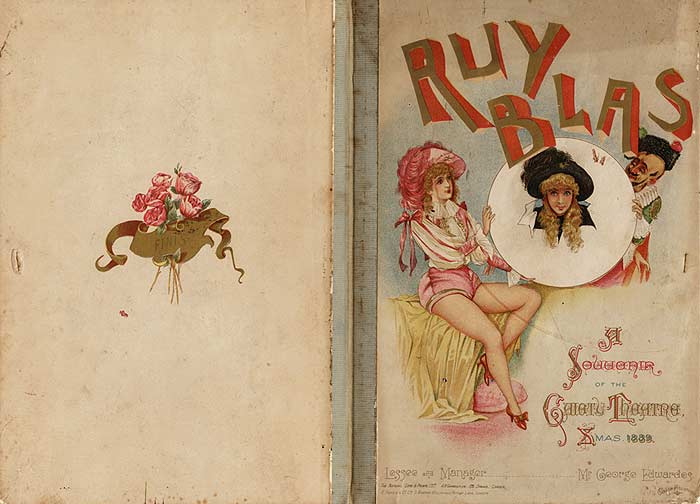
The programme from Ruy Blas and the Blasé Roué, 1889

At a theatre, opera, or ballet performance, they are usually given at the door in the United States, while they are usually sold in the United Kingdom. The Broadway programme makes its money from selling advertisements. A programme company pays the theatre for the rights to produce the production’s programmes, which is contrary to common belief that the theatre pays the programme company. The programme generally contains photos of the production, a cast list, biographies of the actors and production staff involved, the name of the theatre, background information, and can contain advertisements. For example, the programme for the original production of Man of La Mancha contained articles by the staff about how the production was created. The first theatre programmes were issued in the mid-nineteenth century in magazine format. The original theatre programme first appeared in the 18th century. The early playbills were basic, with only enough pages to list the cast members and information on the play's locale and scenes. There were usually only four pages: the cover advertised the show, a back page displayed the theatre layout, and the two interior pages listed all the credits. Not all early programmes were printed, but written by hand and cut and pasted together from the letters of other printed documents. The latter was especially done by theatre entrepreneur Sarah Baker, who owned several theatres in Kent, during the late 18th century.

In early British theatre, the cast was very important. Audiences were very familiar with leading actors and a particular player could draw a larger crowd. The programme was a kind of contract between the theatre and the audience, because if an audience paid to see a particular actor and they were not presented with him, there was the immediate risk of crowd hissing, orange throwing, or even rioting. This sometimes resulted in property damage and physical assault.

Programmes were not only distributed in theatres, but also on the streets. The distributors were often women who worked for the theatre by selling oranges as refreshments to audiences. It has been alluded to that these women were also prostitutes. However, there was still a large rate of illiteracy among theatre goers. This resulted in companies of actors traversing urban streets with a beating drum while announcing upcoming venues.

By the 19th century, the programmes, similar to today's, were being printed. However, the earlier playbills of the 18th century still contained more designs and information about a production. By 1884, advertisements had become a standard feature in playbills. Beginning in New York City, the first company to specialize in printing theatrical programmes was founded by an Ohio business man, Frank Vance Strauss. By 1911, the company was called the Strauss Magazine Theatre Program. On September 23, 1920, the company, then known as the New York Theatre Program Corporation, advertised its sales at a million and a half per month. This corporation was the early foundation for the modern day magazine, Playbill.

During World War II, British theatre programmes underwent a dramatic change as the government placed restrictions over paper use. The programme turned back into a single sheet of paper folded over once to efficiently create four available pages for text. Not until the 1970s were photo printed programmes available and widely distributed at British theatres. The American Playbill did not suffer as severely during the second World War and was still published at a regular rate.

Theatre programmes have become very valuable articles of information for a city or nation's cultural history. An example is Australia's celebration in 2008 over the returning of its earliest surviving document from Canada, which was a theatre playbill from 1796. The playbill advertised the production of The Tragedy of Jane Shore. George Hughes, a convict aboard the First Fleet, printed the playbill using Australia’s first printing press.

In September 2017, the British Library opened its "In the Spotlight" project, showcasing a portion of its collection of nearly a quarter of a million playbills dating from the 1730s to the 1950s. A selection of the playbills were digitalised and placed online, allowing the public to view them, and give feedback.

== Sporting events ==
The programme from Dartford F.C. from the opening of their Watling Street ground

At professional sporting events, programmes are often sold, and contain information about the teams competing. In the United Kingdom, football programmes are issued by the home team for every home match and, as a hobby, are collected by supporters and football enthusiasts. Sports programmes can be highly collectible, with some rare football programmes commanding high prices: in the UK, potentially into the thousands of pounds. Until 2018, the printing of matchday programmes was compulsory for English Football League games.

Oftentimes in European sports, independent companies will publish their own programmes and sell them outside a venue. These are known as fanzines. Although it is less common in the United States, outside of Fenway Park, this is a common occurrence as Yawkey Way Report is sold as well as another booklet.

== Film ==
In the case of films, programmes are rarely provided, although they were frequently given out during the original roadshow engagements of spectaculars such as Ben-Hur (1959), King of Kings (1961), or How the West Was Won (1962), as well as "specialized" films like Disney's Fantasia or the three Laurence Olivier Shakespeare films that he starred in and directed: Henry V, Hamlet, and Richard III. They served much the same function as those for live theater. Programmes for films made in special widescreen processes also explained how the widescreen effect was accomplished. In Japan, each major film release gets its own theatrical pamphlet or "souvenir programme", a popular novelty and collectible item. These programmes often contain exclusive cast interviews and behind-the-scenes information.

== See also ==
- Sports memorabilia
- Media guide, a publication that features in-depth sports team history, statistics and other items of interest meant for sports media which are often available for public purchase
- Concert program
