= Lichfield Mercury =

The Lichfield Mercury is a local newspaper published by Local World Ltd. It serves the Lichfield District, Staffordshire, England, United Kingdom. The newspaper began as the Lichfield Mercury and Midland Chronicle in 1815, published by James Amphlett.
