= Perthshire Advertiser =

Scottish tabloid newspaper

- Type: Bi-weekly newspaper
- Format: Tabloid
- Owner: Reach plc
- Editor: Douglas Dickie
- Founded: 1829 (197 years ago)
- Headquarters: 58 Watergate, Perth, Scotland
- Circulation: (Tue): 968; (Fri): 2,313 (as of 2023)
- Website: perthshireadvertiser.co.uk

The Perthshire Advertiser (originally the Perthshire Advertiser and Strathmore Journal) is a tabloid newspaper, published by Reach plc, in Perth, Scotland. The PA, as it is commonly known, comes out twice a week, on Tuesday and Friday.

Beginning life in 1829, as the Strathmore Journal, and published in Coupar Angus, the 'Strathmore' was renamed the Perthshire Advertiser and Strathmore Journal. C costing 7d and comprising four densely packed pages, it was issued on Thursday mornings.

The paper's price was reduced to fourpence halfpenny on 8 September 1836 and dropped a further penny in 1855 as a result of the reduction in newspaper stamp duty.

In 1866, Samuel Cowan became the paper's printer and publisher, a role he maintained until 1907. The paper dropped its price to 3d in 1870 and in 1873 it began to publish three times a week – on Monday, Wednesday and Friday.

Publication days were changed from Wednesday and Saturday to Tuesday and Friday on 1 March 1977.

== Notable publishers ==
- 1830s: John Taylor
- 18—:George Penny
- 18—: Charles Anderson
- 1866: Samuel Cowan
- 1907: Donald Mathieson
- 1911?: Davidson and Mackay/Munro Press Ltd
- 1958: Scottish Counties Newspapers Ltd
- 1960: George Outram Ltd
- 1972: Scottish and Universal Newspapers Ltd
- 1974: Holmes MacDougall Ltd
- 1977: Scottish and Universal Newspapers Ltd

== Historical circulation ==
By 1832, the PA was already claiming success, suggesting it had doubled subscription numbers during the previous twelve months, and the paper claimed to be "not only the largest of any paper in the country, but equal, if not superior, to that of any provincial journal in the Kingdom". In 1821, annual circulation was 31,000 (average circulation 596). In 1835, this had changed to 26,500. In 1919, 5,000 copies were printed, and by 1921 that had increased to 487,000 and by 1924 this had increased to 766,317. In 1928, net annual circulation was 833,032. By 1979, the paper claimed a circulation of each issue of 12,812 on Wednesday and 19,134 on Friday.

== Printing ==
Originally printed at the printing office in the Kings' Arms Close, off Perth's High Street, adjacent to the municipal buildings, like all Scottish and Universal/Media Scotland newspapers, the PA used to be printed locally, but in the mid-1990s the printing of all of their Scottish titles was centralised at a new custom-built plant at Blantyre. Editions of its newspapers and guides were transferred to being printed in Merseyside in 2016. The PA's Perth office was formerly housed at 36–38 Tay Street.

== See also ==
- List of newspapers in Scotland
